= Russian political jokes =

- Type of joke: Political joke
- Target of joke: Russian politicians, Soviet politicians
- Language(s): Russian, English

Russian political jokes are a part of Russian humour and can be grouped into the major time periods: Imperial Russia, Soviet Union and post-Soviet Russia. In the Soviet period political jokes were a form of social protest, mocking and criticising leaders, the system and its ideology, myths and rites. Quite a few political themes can be found among other standard categories of Russian joke, most notably Rabinovich jokes and Radio Yerevan.

== Russian Empire ==
In Imperial Russia, most political jokes were of the polite variety that circulated in educated society. Few of the political jokes of the time are recorded, but some were printed in a 1904 German anthology.

- A man was reported to have said: "Nikolay is a moron!" and was arrested by a policeman. "No, sir, I meant not our respected Tsar, but another Nikolay!" – "Don't try to trick me: if you say 'moron', you are obviously referring to our Tsar!"
- A respected merchant, Sevenassov (Russian: Семижопов, Semizhopov, analyzed as семь 'seven' + жопа 'ass' (as in 'buttocks') + -ов), wants to change his surname, and asks the Tsar for permission. The Tsar gives his decision in writing: "Permitted to subtract two asses".

There were also numerous politically themed Chastushki (Russian traditional songs) in Imperial Russia.

In Pale Fire by Vladimir Nabokov, the fictional author of the "Foreword", Charles Kinbote, cites the following Russian joke:

- A newspaper account of a Russian tsar's coronation had, instead of "korona" (crown), the misprint "vorona" (crow), and when next day this was apologetically 'corrected,' it got misprinted a second time as "korova" (cow).

He comments on the uncanny linguistic parallelism between the English-language "crown-crow-cow" and the Russian "korona–vorona–korova".

== Soviet Union ==
In the Soviet Union, telling political jokes could be regarded as a type of extreme sport: according to Article 58 (RSFSR Penal Code), "anti-Soviet propaganda" was a potentially capital offense.

- A judge walks out of his chambers laughing his head off. A colleague approaches him and asks why he is laughing. "I just heard the funniest joke in the world!" "Well, go ahead, tell me!" says the other judge. "I can't – I just gave someone ten years for it!"
- "Who built the White Sea Canal?" – “The left bank was built by those who told the jokes, and the right bank by those who listened.”

Ben Lewis claims that the political conditions in the Soviet Union were responsible for the unique humour produced there; according to him, "Communism was a humour-producing machine. Its economic theories and system of repression created inherently amusing situations. There were jokes under fascism and the Nazis too, but those systems did not create an absurd, laugh-a-minute reality like communism."

=== Early Soviet times ===
- Midnight Petrograd... A Red Guards night watch spots a shadow trying to sneak by. "Stop! Who goes there? Documents!" The frightened person chaotically rummages through his pockets and drops a paper. The Guards chief picks it up and reads slowly, with difficulty: "U.ri.ne A.na.ly.sis"... "Hmm...a foreigner, sounds like..." "A spy, looks like.... Let's shoot him on the spot!" Then he reads further: "'Proteins: none, Sugars: none, Fats: none...' You are free to go, proletarian comrade! Long live the World revolution!"

=== Communism ===
According to Marxist–Leninist theory, communism in the strict sense is the final stage of evolution of a society after it has passed through the socialism stage. The Soviet Union thus cast itself as a socialist country trying to build communism, which was supposed to be a classless society.

- The principle of the state capitalism of the period of transition to communism: the authorities pretend they are paying wages, workers pretend they are working. Alternatively, "So long as the bosses pretend to pay us, we will pretend to work." This joke persisted essentially unchanged through the 1980s.

Satirical verses and parodies made fun of official Soviet propaganda slogans.

- "Lenin has died, but his cause lives on!" (An actual slogan.) Punchline variant #1: Rabinovich notes: "I would prefer it the other way round." Variant #2: "What a coincidence: Brezhnev has died, but his body lives on". (An allusion to Brezhnev's mental feebleness coupled with the medically assisted staving off of his death. Additional comedic effect in the second variant is produced by the fact that the words 'cause' (delo) and 'body' (telo) rhyme in Russian.)
- Lenin coined a slogan about how communism would be achieved thanks to the political power of the Soviets and the modernization of the Russian industry and agriculture: "Communism is Soviet power plus electrification of the whole country!" The slogan was subjected to mathematical scrutiny by the people: "Consequently, Soviet power is communism minus electrification, and electrification is communism minus Soviet power."
- A chastushka ridiculing the tendency to praise the Party left and right:
  The winter's passed,
  The summer's here.
  For this we thank
  Our party dear!
  Translation:
  Прошла зима,
  настало лето.
  Спасибо партии
  за это!

Some jokes allude to notions long forgotten. These relics are still funny, but may look strange.

- Q: Will there be a KGB in communism?
  A: As you know, under communism, the state will be abolished, together with its means of suppression. People will know how to self-arrest. (The original version was about the Cheka. During the Cheka times, in addition to the standard taxation to which the peasants were subjected, the latter were often forced to perform samooblozhenie ("self-taxation") – after delivering a normal amount of agricultural products, prosperous peasants, especially those declared to be kulaks were expected to "voluntarily" deliver the same amount again; sometimes even "double samooblozhenie" was applied.)
- Q: How do you deal with mice in the Kremlin?
  A: Put up a sign saying "collective farm". Then half the mice will starve, and the rest will run away.

=== Gulag ===
- "Three gulag inmates are telling each other what they’re in for. The first one says: 'I was five minutes late for work, and they charged me with sabotage.' The second says: 'For me it was just the opposite: I was five minutes early for work, and they charged me with espionage.' The third one says: 'I got to work right on time, and they charged me with harming the Soviet economy by acquiring a watch in a capitalist country.'"
- Three men are sitting in a cell in Lubyanka prison. The first asks the second why he has been imprisoned, who replies, "Because I criticized Karl Radek." The first man responds, "But I am here because I spoke out in favor of Radek!" They turn to the third man who has been sitting quietly in the back, and ask him why he is in jail. He answers, "I'm Karl Radek."
- "Lubyanka (KGB headquarters) is the tallest building in Moscow. You can see Siberia from its basement."
- Armenian Radio was asked: "Is it true that conditions in our labor camps are excellent?" Armenian Radio answers: "It is true. Five years ago a listener of ours raised the same question and was sent to one, reportedly to investigate the issue. He hasn't returned yet; we are told that he liked it there."
- "Comrade Brezhnev, is it true that you collect political jokes?" – "Yes" – "And how many have you collected so far?" – "Three and a half labor camps." (Compare with a similar East German joke about Stasi.)
- A new arrival to Gulag is asked: "What were you given ten years for?" – "For nothing!" – "Don't lie to us here, now! Everybody knows 'for nothing' is three years." (This joke was reported from the pre-Great Purge times. Later 'for nothing' was elevated to five and even ten years.)

==== Gulag Archipelago ====
Alexander Solzhenitsyn's book The Gulag Archipelago has a chapter entitled "Zeks as a Nation", which is a mock ethnographic essay intended to "prove" that the inhabitants of the Gulag Archipelago constitute a separate nation according to "the only scientific definition of nation given by comrade Stalin". As part of this research, Solzhenitsyn analyzes the humor of zeks (gulag inmates). Some examples:

- "He was sentenced to three years, served five, and then he got lucky and was released ahead of time." (The joke alludes to the common practice described by Solzhenitsyn of arbitrarily extending the term of a sentence or adding new charges.) In a similar vein, when someone asked for more of something, e.g. more boiled water in a cup, the typical retort was, "The prosecutor will give you more!" (In Russian: "Прокурор добавит!")
- "Is it hard to be in the gulag?" – "Only for the first ten years."
- When the quarter-century term had become the standard sentence for contravening Article 58, the standard joke comment to the freshly sentenced was: "OK, now 25 years of life are guaranteed for you!"

=== Censorship ===
==== Armenian Radio ====
The Armenian Radio or "Radio Yerevan" jokes have the format, "ask us whatever you want, we will answer you whatever we want". They supply snappy or ambiguous answers to questions on politics, commodities, the economy or other subjects that were taboo during the Communist era. Questions and answers from this fictitious radio station are known even outside Russia.

- Q: What's the difference between a capitalist fairy tale and a Marxist fairy tale?
  A: A capitalist fairy tale begins, "Once upon a time, there was..." A Marxist fairy tale begins, "Some day, there will be..."
- Q: Is it true that there is freedom of speech in the USSR, just like in the USA?
  A: Yes. In the USA, you can stand in front of the White House in Washington, DC, and yell, "Down with Ronald Reagan", and you will not be punished. Equally, you can also stand in Red Square in Moscow and yell, "Down with Ronald Reagan", and you will not be punished.
- Q: Is it true that they are giving away cars in Moscow, on Red Square?
  A: Yes—but not in Moscow, in Leningrad. Not on Red Square, but in the vicinity of the Warsaw Station. Not cars, but bicycles. And they aren't giving them away—they're stealing them.

==== Pravda and Izvestia ====
From the 1960s until the early 1980s, the Soviet Union had three major national newspapers: Pravda ("Truth"), Izvestia ("News"), and Krasnaya Zvezda ("Red Star"). All three were controlled and censored by the government, leading Soviet citizens to joke: "There's no news in 'Truth', and there's no truth in 'News'." (Russian: В « Правде » нет известий, а в « Известиях » нет правды, romanized: V « Pravde » net izvestij, a v « Izvestijah » net pravdy). Variant translations include: "In the Truth there is no news, and in the News there is no truth".

=== Political figures ===
- Vladimir Lenin, Joseph Stalin, Nikita Khrushchev and Leonid Brezhnev are all travelling together in a railway carriage. Unexpectedly, the train stops. Lenin suggests: "Perhaps we should announce a subbotnik, so that workers and peasants will fix the problem." Stalin puts his head out of the window and shouts, "If the train does not start moving, the driver will be shot!" (an allusion to the Great Purge). But the train doesn't start moving. Khrushchev then shouts, "Let's take the rails from behind the train and use them to lay the tracks in front" (an allusion to Khrushchev's various reorganizations). But still the train doesn't move. Then Brezhnev says, "Comrades, Comrades, let's draw the curtains, turn on the gramophone and pretend we're moving!" (an allusion to the Brezhnev stagnation period). A later continuation to this has Mikhail Gorbachev saying, "We were going the wrong way anyway!" and changing the train's direction (alluding to his policies of glasnost and perestroika), and Boris Yeltsin driving the train off the rails and through a field (allusion to the breakup of the Soviet Union).

==== Lenin ====
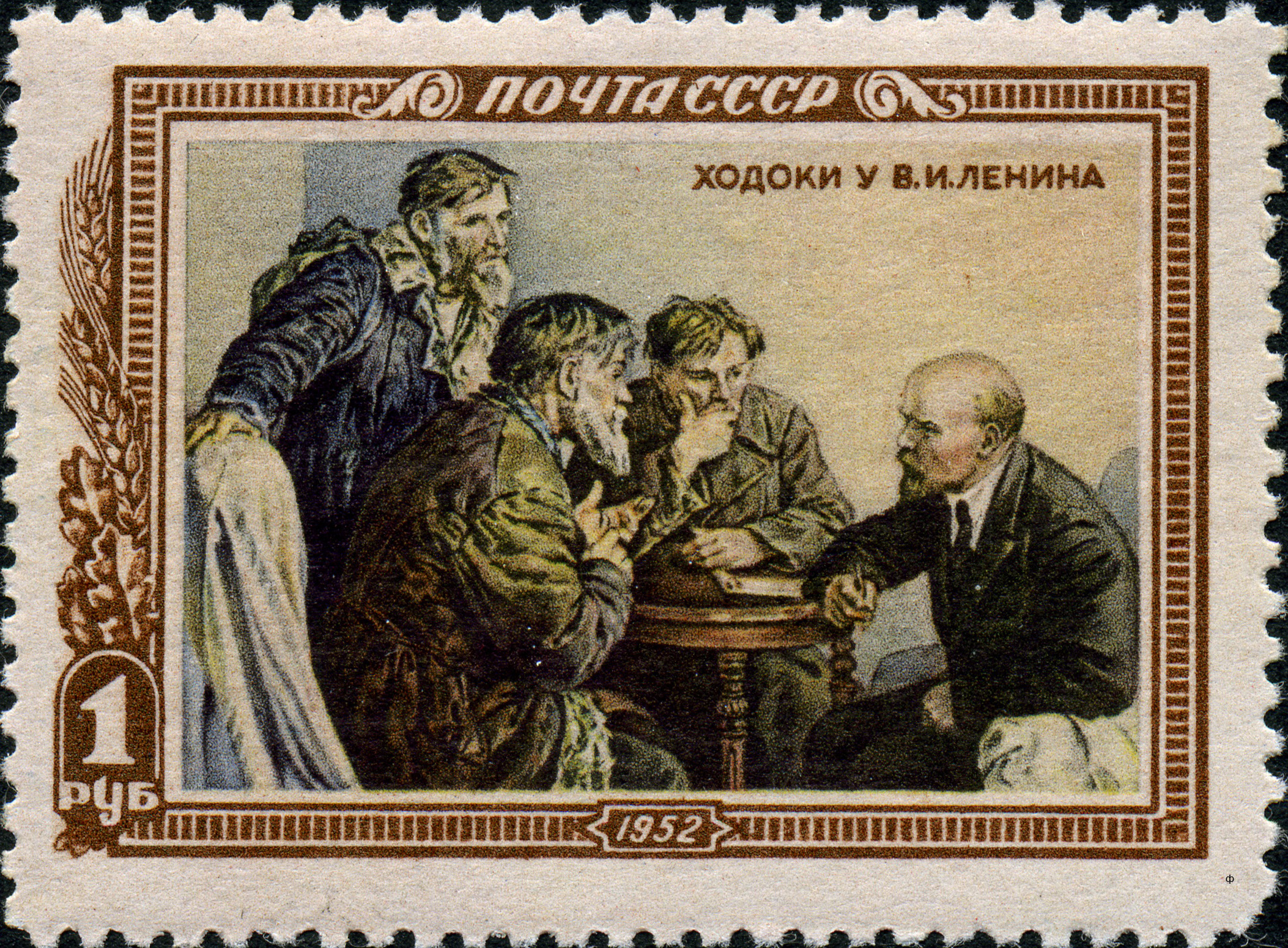
A group of khodoki (petitioners) visiting Lenin; khodoki were often depicted in propaganda stories about Lenin, and in jokes making fun of such stories.

Jokes about Vladimir Lenin, the leader of the Russian Revolution of 1917, typically made fun of characteristics popularized by propaganda: his supposed kindness, his love of children (Lenin never had children of his own), his sharing nature, his kind eyes, etc. Accordingly, in jokes Lenin is often depicted as sneaky and hypocritical. A popular joke set-up is Lenin interacting with the head of the secret police, Felix Edmundovich Dzerzhinsky, in the Smolny, the seat of the revolutionary communist government in Petrograd, or with khodoki, peasants who came to see Lenin.

- During the famine of the civil war, a delegation of starving peasants comes to the Smolny with complaints. "We have even started eating grass like horses," says one peasant. "Soon we will start neighing like horses!" "Come now! Don't worry!" says Lenin reassuringly. "We are drinking tea with honey here, and we're not buzzing like bees, are we?"
- (Concerning the omnipresent Lenin propaganda): A kindergarten group is on a walk in a park, and they see a baby hare. These are city kids who have never seen a hare. "Do you know who this is?" asks the teacher. No one knows. "Come on, kids", says the teacher, "He's a character in many of the stories, songs and poems we are always reading." Finally one kid works out the answer, pats the hare and says reverently, "So that's what you're like, Grandpa Lenin!"
- An artist is commissioned to create a painting celebrating Soviet–Polish friendship, to be called "Lenin in Poland." When the painting is unveiled at the Kremlin, there is a gasp from the invited guests; the painting depicts Nadezhda Krupskaya (Lenin's wife) naked in bed with Leon Trotsky. One guest asks, "But this is a travesty! Where is Lenin?" To which the painter replies, "Lenin is in Poland" (the joke capitalizes on the title of the real film, Lenin in Poland).

==== Stalin ====
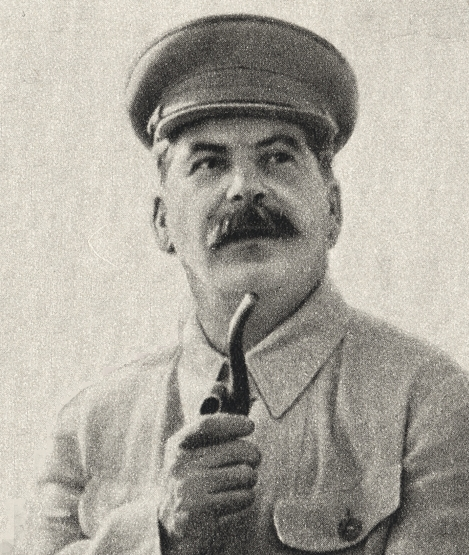
Joseph Stalin

Jokes about Stalin usually refer to his paranoia and contempt for human life. Stalin's words are typically pronounced with a heavy Georgian accent.

- Stalin attends the premiere of a Soviet comedy movie. He laughs and grins throughout the film, but after it ends he says, "Well, I liked the comedy. But that clown had a moustache just like mine. Shoot him." Everyone is speechless, until someone sheepishly suggests, "Comrade Stalin, maybe the actor shaves off his moustache?" Stalin replies, "Good idea! First shave, then shoot!" There is a terser variant of the answer: "Or like this way." (Russian: Или так)
- Stalin reads his report to the Party Congress. Suddenly someone sneezes. "Who sneezed?" Silence. "First row! On your feet! Shoot them!" They are shot, and he asks again, "Who sneezed, Comrades?" No answer. "Second row! On your feet! Shoot them!" They are shot too. "Well, who sneezed?" At last a sobbing cry resounds in the Congress Hall, "It was me! Me!" Stalin says, "Bless you, Comrade!" and resumes his speech.
- A secretary (in some versions Alexander Poskrebyshev) is standing outside the Kremlin as Marshal Zhukov leaves a meeting with Stalin, and he hears him muttering under his breath, "Murderous moustache!" He runs in to see Stalin and breathlessly reports, "I just heard Zhukov say 'Murderous moustache'!" Stalin dismisses the secretary and sends for Zhukov, who comes back in. "Who did you have in mind with 'Murderous moustache'?" asks Stalin. "Why, Josef Vissarionovich, Hitler, of course!" Stalin thanks him, dismisses him, and calls the secretary back. "And who did you think he was talking about?"
- At a May Day parade, a very old Jew carries a placard that reads, "Thank you, comrade Stalin, for my happy childhood!" A Party representative approaches the old man. "What's that? Are you mocking our Party? Everyone can see that when you were a child, comrade Stalin hadn't yet been born!" The old man replies, "That's precisely why I'm grateful to him!"
- Stalin loses his favourite pipe. In a few days, Lavrentiy Beria calls Stalin: "Have you found your pipe?" "Yes," replies Stalin. "I found it under the sofa." "This is impossible!" exclaims Beria. "Three people have already confessed they stole it!"

==== Khrushchev ====
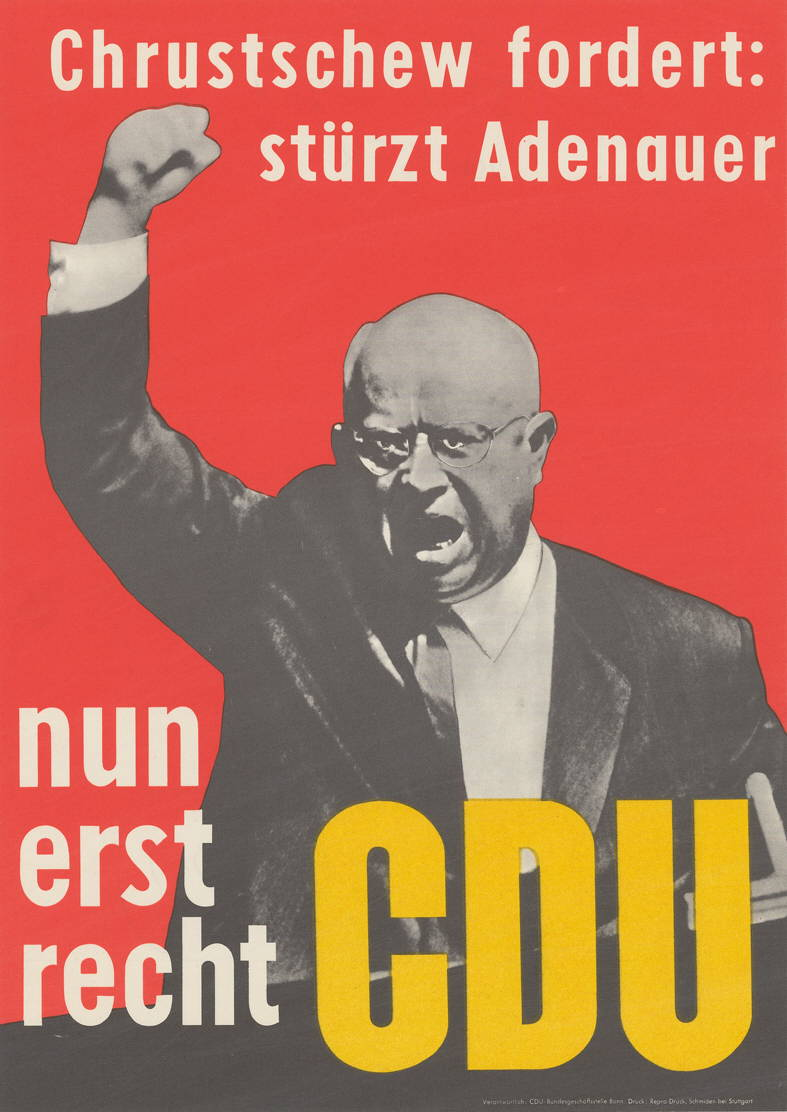
"Khrushchev demands: overthrow Adenauer; now more than ever CDU"

Jokes about Nikita Khrushchev often relate to his attempts to reform the economy, especially to introduce maize. He was even called kukuruznik ('maizeman'). Other jokes target the crop failures resulting from his mismanagement of agriculture, his innovations in urban architecture, his confrontation with the US while importing US consumer goods, his promises to build communism in 20 years, or simply his baldness and crude manners.

- Khrushchev visited a pig farm and was photographed there. In the newspaper office, a discussion is underway about how to caption the picture. "Comrade Khrushchev among pigs", "Comrade Khrushchev and pigs", and "Pigs surround comrade Khrushchev" are all rejected as politically offensive. Finally, the editor announces his decision: "Third from left – comrade Khrushchev."
- Why was Khrushchev defeated? Because of the Seven "C"s: Cult of personality, Communism, China, Cuban Crisis, Corn, and Cuzka's mother. (In Russian, this is the seven "K"s. To "show somebody Kuzka's mother" is a Russian idiom meaning "to give somebody a hard time". Khrushchev had used this phrase during a speech at the United Nations General Assembly, allegedly referring to the Tsar Bomba test over Novaya Zemlya.)
- Khrushchev, surrounded by his aides and bodyguards, surveys an art exhibition. "What the hell is this green circle with yellow spots all over?" he asked. His aide answered, "This painting, comrade Khrushchev, depicts our heroic peasants fighting for the fulfillment of the plan to produce two hundred million tons of grain." "Ah-h... And what is this black triangle with red stripes?" "This painting shows our heroic industrial workers in a factory." "And what is this arse with ears?" "Comrade Khrushchev, this is not a painting, this is a mirror." (The joke alludes to the Manege Affair, Khrushchev's thunderous denouncing of modern art at an exhibition at the Moscow Manege.)

==== Brezhnev ====
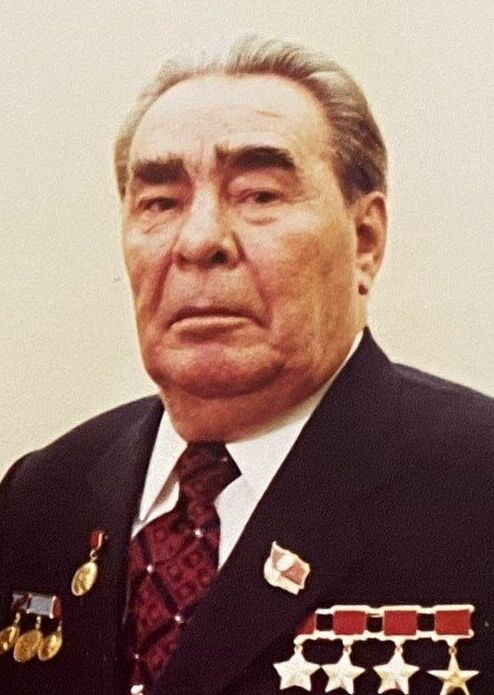
Leonid Brezhnev

Leonid Brezhnev was depicted as dim-witted, senile, always reading his speeches from paper, and prone to delusions of grandeur.

- Have you heard, Brezhnev had a chest-expansion surgery? – To make more space for new medals.
  - This makes reference to Brezhnev's vanity and frequent granting of decorations to him by sycophants and sometimes even to himself, by himself.
- One morning at dawn, Brezhnev awoke to see the sun rising. He called out "Good morning, our red sun!" the sun replied, "Good morning, Leonid Il'ich, I wish you new successes for the good of the Motherland." At noon Brezhnev stepped outside and saw the sun high in the heavens. He called out "Good afternoon, bright sun!" The sun replied, "Good afternoon, Leonid Il'ich! I congratulate you on becoming the newest Marshal of the Soviet Union!" As evening approached, Brezhnev stepped outside and saw the sun going down. He called out, "Good evening, golden sun!" The sun replied, "Go to hell, you old jackass! I'm in the West now!"
  There was the same East German joke about Erich Honecker.
- At the 1980 Summer Olympics, Brezhnev begins his speech: "O!"–applause. "O!"–more applause. "O!"–yet more applause. "O!"–an ovation. "O!!!"–a standing ovation from the whole audience. An aide comes running to the podium and whispers, "Leonid Ilyich, those are the Olympic logo rings, you don't need to read all of them!"
- "Leonid Ilyich!..." / "Come on, no formalities among comrades. Just call me 'Ilyich'." (Note: In Soviet parlance, by itself "Ilyich" refers by default to Vladimir Lenin, and "Just call me 'Ilyich'" was a line from a well-known poem about Lenin, written by Mayakovsky.)
- Brezhnev makes a speech: "Everyone in the Politburo has dementia. Comrade Pelshe doesn't recognize himself: I say 'Hello, comrade Pelshe', and he responds 'Hello, Leonid Ilyich, but I'm not Pelshe.' Comrade Gromyko is like a child – he's taken my rubber donkey from my desk. And during comrade Grechko's funeral – by the way, why is he absent? – nobody but me thought of inviting a lady for a dance when the music started playing."

Quite a few jokes capitalized on the cliché used in Soviet speeches of the time: "Dear Leonid Ilyich".

- The phone rings, Brezhnev picks up the receiver: "Hello, this is dear Leonid Ilyich..."

==== Geriatric leadership ====
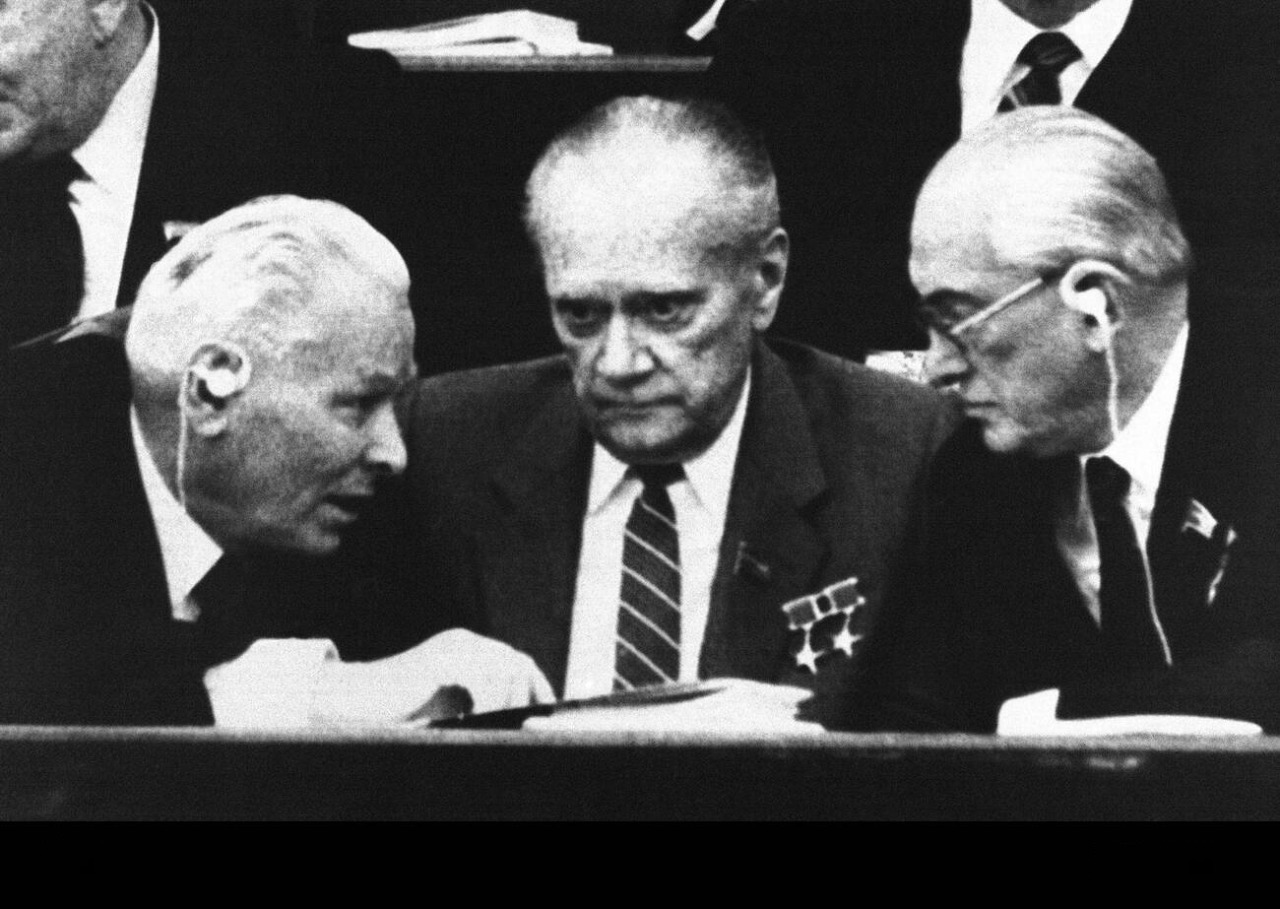
Konstantin Chernenko, Nikolai Tikhonov and Yuri Andropov

During Brezhnev's time, the leadership of the Communist Party became increasingly geriatric. By the time of his death in 1982, the median age of the Politburo was 70. Brezhnev's successor, Yuri Andropov, died in 1984. His successor, Konstantin Chernenko, died in 1985. Rabinovich said he did not have to buy tickets to the funerals, as he had a subscription to these events. As Andropov's bad health became common knowledge (he was eventually attached to a dialysis machine), several jokes made the rounds:

- "Why did Brezhnev go abroad, while Andropov did not? Because Brezhnev ran on batteries, but Andropov needed an outlet." (A reference to Brezhnev's pacemaker and Andropov's dialysis machine.)
- "What is the main difference between succession under the tsarist regime and under socialism?" "Under the tsarist regime, power was transferred from father to son, and under socialism – from grandfather to grandfather." (A play on words: in Russian, 'grandfather' is traditionally used in the sense of 'old man'.)
- TASS announcement: "Today, due to bad health and without regaining consciousness, Konstantin Ustinovich Chernenko took up the duties of Secretary General." (The first element in the sentence is the customary form of words at the beginning of state leaders' obituaries.)
- Another TASS announcement: "Dear comrades, of course you're going to laugh, but the Communist Party of the Soviet Union, and the entire Soviet nation, has again suffered a great loss." The phrase "of course you're going to laugh" (вы, конечно, будете смеяться) is a staple of the Odesa humor and way of speech, and the joke itself is a remake of a hundred-year-old one.

==== Gorbachev ====
Mikhail Gorbachev was occasionally mocked for his poor grammar, but perestroika-era jokes usually made fun of his slogans and ineffective actions, his birth mark ("Satan's mark"), Raisa Gorbacheva's poking her nose everywhere, and Soviet–American relations.

- In a restaurant:
  - Why are the meatballs cube-shaped?
  - Perestroika! (restructuring)
  - Why are they undercooked?
  - Uskoreniye! (acceleration)
  - Why have they got a bite out of them?
  - Gospriyomka! (state approval)
  - Why are you telling me all this so brazenly?
  - Glasnost! (openness)

=== Washington Oblast committee ===
- Ronald Reagan awakens, in a cold sweat. His wife asks:
  - Ronnie, what happened?
  - My dear, I've had a nightmare. It's the twenty-sixth CPSU congress and Brezhnev says: "Dear comrades, we have listened to reports about situation in Bryansk and Oryol oblasts. Now, let's listen to the First Secretary of the Washington oblast Party committee, comrade Reagan." And you know what? I was not prepared!

=== "The Soviet Union is the homeland of elephants" ===
In its declaration of national glories, the Soviet government claimed at various times, such as through Pravda publications, to have invented the airplane, steam engine, radio, and lightbulb, and promoted the pseudoscientific agricultural claims of Lysenko as part of Stalinist pseudohistory. This was joked about in the phrase "Homeland of Elephants" from the early 1940s, sardonically claiming that the Soviet Union was also the birthplace of elephants. An anecdote from Andrei Sakharov includes "(1) classics of Marxism–Leninism–Stalinism on elephants; (2) Russia, the elephants' homeland, (3) the Soviet elephant, the world's best elephant (4) the Belorussian elephant, the Russian elephant's little brother."

The joke has persisted in the form of "Russia is the homeland of elephants" (Russian: Россия – родина слонов.)

=== KGB ===
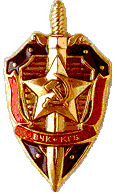
Symbol of the KGB

- A hotel. A room for four with four strangers. Three of them soon open a bottle of vodka and proceed to get acquainted, then drunk, then noisy, singing, and telling political jokes. The fourth man desperately tries to get some sleep; finally, in frustration he surreptitiously leaves the room, goes downstairs, and asks the lady concierge to bring tea to Room 67 in ten minutes. Then he returns and joins the party. Five minutes later, he bends to a power outlet: "Comrade Major, some tea to Room 67, please." In a few minutes, there's a knock at the door, and in comes the lady concierge with a tea tray. The room falls silent; the party dies a sudden death, and the prankster finally gets to sleep. The next morning he wakes up alone in the room. Surprised, he runs downstairs and asks the concierge what happened to his companions. "You don't need to know!" she answers. "B-but...but what about me?" asks the terrified fellow. 'Oh, you...well...Comrade Major liked your tea gag a lot."
- The KGB, the GIGN (or in some versions of the joke, the FBI) and the CIA are all trying to prove they are the best at catching criminals. The Secretary General of the UN decides to set them a test. He releases a rabbit into a forest, and each of them has to catch it. The CIA people go in. They place animal informants throughout the forest. They question all plant and mineral witnesses. After three months of extensive investigations, they conclude that the rabbit does not exist. The GIGN (or FBI) goes in. After two weeks with no leads they burn the forest, killing everything in it, including the rabbit, and make no apologies: the rabbit had it coming. The KGB goes in. They come out two hours later with a badly beaten bear. The bear is yelling: "Okay! Okay! I'm a rabbit! I'm a rabbit!"
- What's the difference between the KGB and the OBKhSS (Department Against Misappropriation of Socialist Property)? The KGB will be interested in you if you're not satisfied with life in the Soviet Union, and the OBKhSS will if you are satisfied with life in the Soviet Union.

Quite a few jokes and other humour capitalized on the fact that Soviet citizens were under KGB surveillance even when abroad:

- A quartet of violinists returns from an international competition. One of them was honored with the opportunity to play a Stradivarius violin, and cannot stop bragging about it. The violinist who came in last grunts: "What's so special about that?" The first one thinks for a minute: "Let me put it to you this way: just imagine that you were given the chance to fire a couple of shots from Dzerzhinsky's Mauser..."

=== Daily Soviet life ===
- "We pretend to work, and they pretend to pay." (The joke hints at low productivity and subsistence-level wages within the Soviet economy.)
- Five precepts of the Soviet intelligentsia (intellectuals):
  - Don't think.
  - If you think, then don't speak.
  - If you think and speak, then don't write.
  - If you think, speak and write, then don't sign.
  - If you think, speak, write and sign, then don't be surprised.
- Seven wonders of the Soviet planned economy:
  - There's no unemployment, but nobody works.
  - Nobody works, but the plan gets fulfilled.
  - The plan is fulfilled, but there's nothing to buy.
  - There's nothing to buy, but there are lines everywhere.
  - There are lines everywhere, but every fridge is full.
  - Every fridge is full, but no one is satisfied.
  - No one is satisfied, but everyone still votes for CPSU.
- A regional Communist Party meeting is held to celebrate the anniversary of the Great October Socialist Revolution. The chairman gives a speech: "Dear comrades! Let's look at the amazing achievements of our Party after the revolution. For example, Maria here, who was she before the revolution? An illiterate peasant; she had but one dress and no shoes. And now? She is an exemplary milkmaid known throughout the entire region. Or look at Ivan Andreev, he was the poorest man in this village; he had no horse, no cow, and not even an ax. And now? He is a tractor driver with two pairs of shoes! Or Trofim Semenovich Alekseev – he was a nasty hooligan, a drunk, and a dirty gadabout. Nobody would trust him with as much as a snowdrift in wintertime, as he would steal anything he could get his hands on. And now he's Secretary of the Regional Party Committee!"

Some jokes ridiculed the level of indoctrination in the Soviet Union's education system:

- "My wife has been going to cooking school for three years." / "She must really cook well by now!" / "No, so far they've only got as far as the bit about the Twentieth CPSU Congress."

Quite a few jokes poke fun at the permanent shortages in various shops.

- A man walks into a shop and asks, "You wouldn't happen to have any fish, would you?" The shop assistant replies, "You've got it wrong – ours is a butcher's shop. We don't have any meat. You're looking for the fish shop across the road. They wouldn't happen to have any fish!"
- An American man and a Soviet man died on the same day and went to Hell together. The Devil told them: "You may choose to enter two different types of Hell: the first is the American-style one, where you can do anything you like, but only on condition of eating a bucketful of manure every day; the second is the Soviet-style hell, where you can also do anything you like, but only on condition of eating two bucketfuls of manure a day." The American chose the American-style Hell, and the Soviet man chose the Soviet-style one. A few months later, they met again. The Soviet man asked the American: "Hi, how are you getting on?" The American said: "I can't stand the bucketful of manure every day! How about you?" The Soviet man replied: "Well, I'm fine: it is either a shortage of manure, or somebody stole all buckets."

A subgenre of the above-mentioned type of joke targets shortages of commodities, with wait times in sign-up queues that could be counted in years.

- "I want to sign up for the waiting list for a car. How long is it?" / "Precisely ten years from today." / "Morning or evening?" / "Why, what difference does it make?" / "The plumber's due in the morning."

The above joke was famously mentioned by US President Ronald Reagan multiple times.

== Russian Federation ==
- Q: What did capitalism accomplish in one year that communism could not do in seventy years? A: Make communism look good. (The joke refers to shock privatization and sharp drop in the welfare of common people during the post-Communism transition to capitalism in Russia.)

From at least 2015, a common jocular phrase is the "battle of the television and the refrigerator (битва холодильника с телевизором)." This refers to the balance between state media and actual living conditions in Russia: whether state propaganda on TV is able to overcome the presence of empty fridges.

=== Boris Yeltsin ===
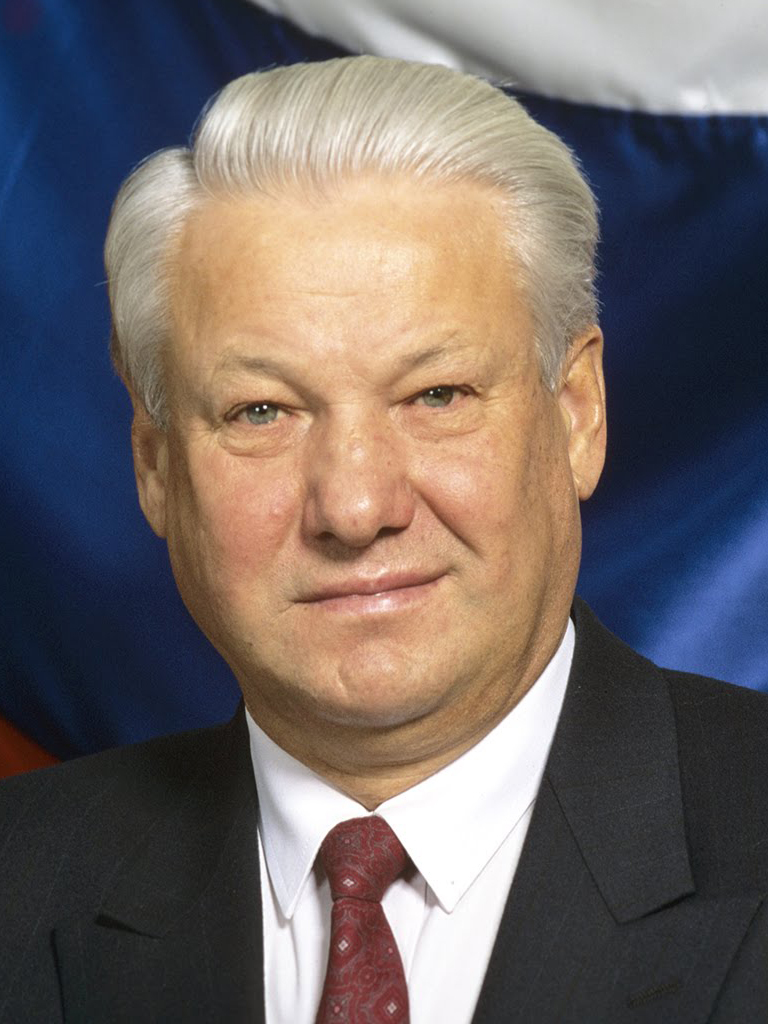
Boris Yeltsin

Jokes about Boris Yeltsin commonly revolved around the economic shocks caused by privatisation, the rapid democratisation of the Russian political scene, and corruption and authoritarianism by Yeltsin's government.

- At a meeting of the State Duma, a deputy shows up wearing shorts and a tee shirt. "Who allowed you to show up at a parliamentary session looking like that?" demands Yeltsin.
  "What do you mean, who?! The queen of England herself! Last month, when our delegation went to London, I showed up at their parliament dressed the same way. The queen said to me, 'You can go to your own Russian parliament looking like that, but...'"
- A military parade marches through Red Square. First pass army troops, then the equipment: tanks, artillery, missiles. Then, at the end, with a confident stride march a group of people in business suits with briefcases. President Yeltsin asks his KGB chief, "Are they your people?"
  "No."
  He turns to the Minister of Defense: "Are they yours?"
  "No."
  Prime Minister Chernomyrdin leans toward the president and whispers, "Those people are my economists. They don't look like much. But they have horrifying powers of destruction. Within a couple of weeks they can destroy any country."
- In the parliamentary personnel office, a clerk asks a lawmaker, "How long were you at your last place of employment?"
  "Eight years," answers the deputy.
  "Why did you leave?"
  "I got pardoned."
- Three mothers chat while taking a stroll with their babies. "I'm sure my boy is going to be a doctor. Look how carefully he examines his pinkie!"
  "And mine will be an engineer," says another woman. "Look how swiftly he handles the shiny bar on his stroller."
  "And mine is going to be this country's President. He's in shit all over, but still he carries his little head proudly."
  - This joke is in reference to Russia's numerous political and economic crises under Yeltsin, and the government's refusal to take responsibility.
- Yeltsin wakes up with a huge New Year's Day hangover. "Now," he thinks, "I need to find someone who remembers what I said last night."
  - In reference to Yeltsin's 1999 resignation, which was televised on New Year's Eve.

=== Vladimir Putin ===
- From President's decree: "All jokes about Vovochka are henceforth considered to be political."
- President Vladimir Putin has released a new programme for reform. Its first goal: To make people rich and happy. (List of people attached.)

Many draw parallels between Vladimir Putin and Joseph Stalin: his opponents do it accusingly, while neo-Stalinists proudly. Many jokes about past Soviet leaders are retold about Putin:

- Stalin appears to Putin in a dream and says: "I have two bits of advice for you: kill off all your opponents and paint the Kremlin blue." Putin asks, "Why blue?" Stalin: "I knew you would not object to the first one."

== See also ==
- Russian jokes
- East German jokes
- Hammer & Tickle
- Bald–hairy
- Lenin was a mushroom
