= East Frisian jokes =

Jokes about a North German population group

Map of East Frisia

In German humour, East Frisian jokes (German: Ostfriesenwitz) belong to the group of riddle jokes about certain nationalities, in this case the East Frisians of northern Germany.

The basic structure of these jokes takes the form of a simple question and answer; the question often asking something about the nature of the East Frisian and the humorous reply usually being at the expense of the supposedly stupid and/or primitive East Frisian. Often the East Frisians are portrayed as farmers, rural folk or coastal dwellers. Many punch lines describe the foolishness of East Frisians by using figure of speech or a word used in a different sense (a pun or play on words).

Sometimes the reverse situation also occurs in which the East Frisians are the wiser; and are contrasted usually with a group of people from the southern German-speaking world.

Comedians such as Otto Waalkes and Karl Dall include East Frisian jokes in their repertoires, usually in a free format.

In East Frisia itself these jokes are usually accepted. The positive effect of a greater awareness of the relatively small region of East Frisia resulting from this humour is recognized and welcomed. A modern legend even suggests that these jokes were invented by the East Frisians.

== Examples ==
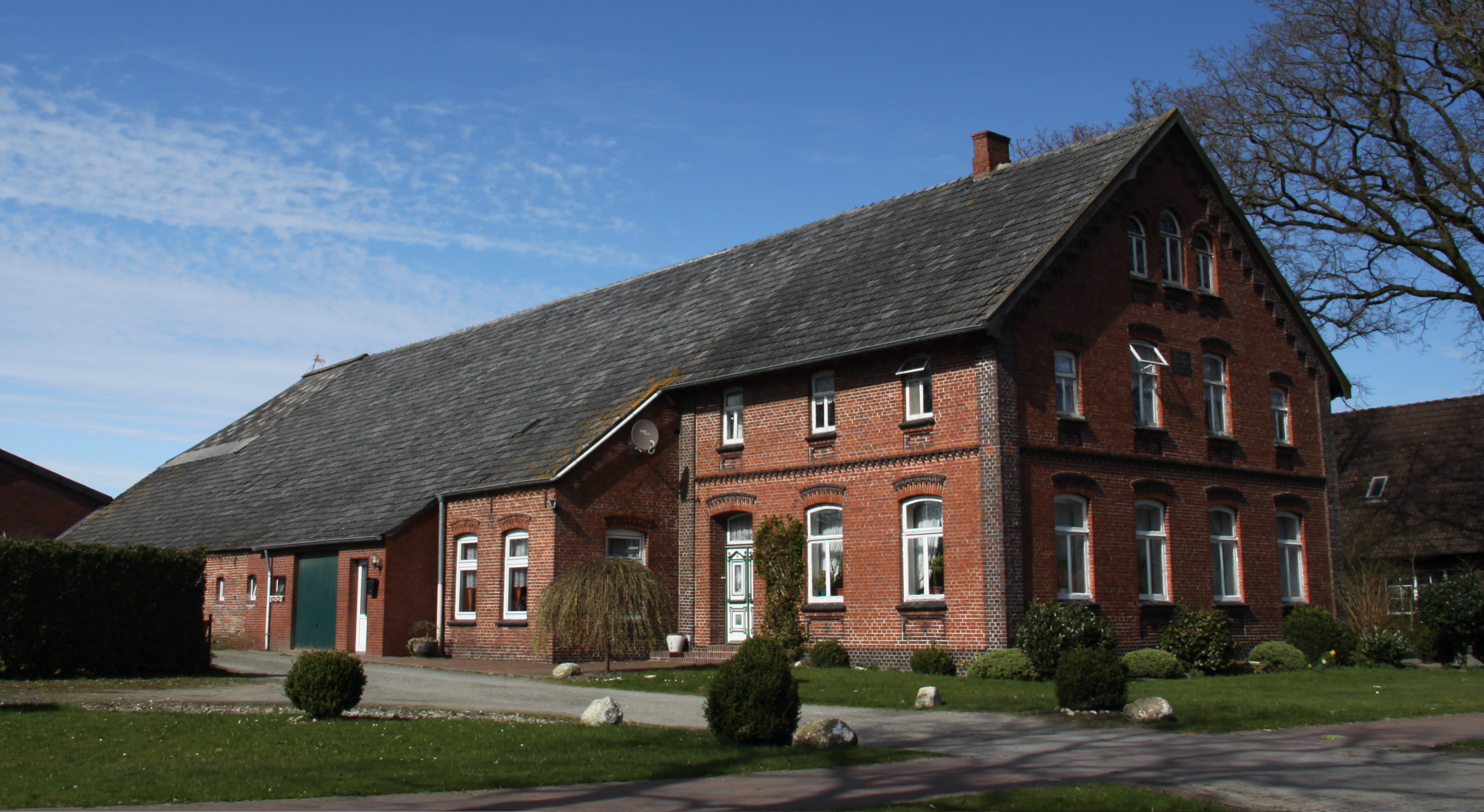
A recurring theme is rural folk (Farm near Aurich, East Frisia)

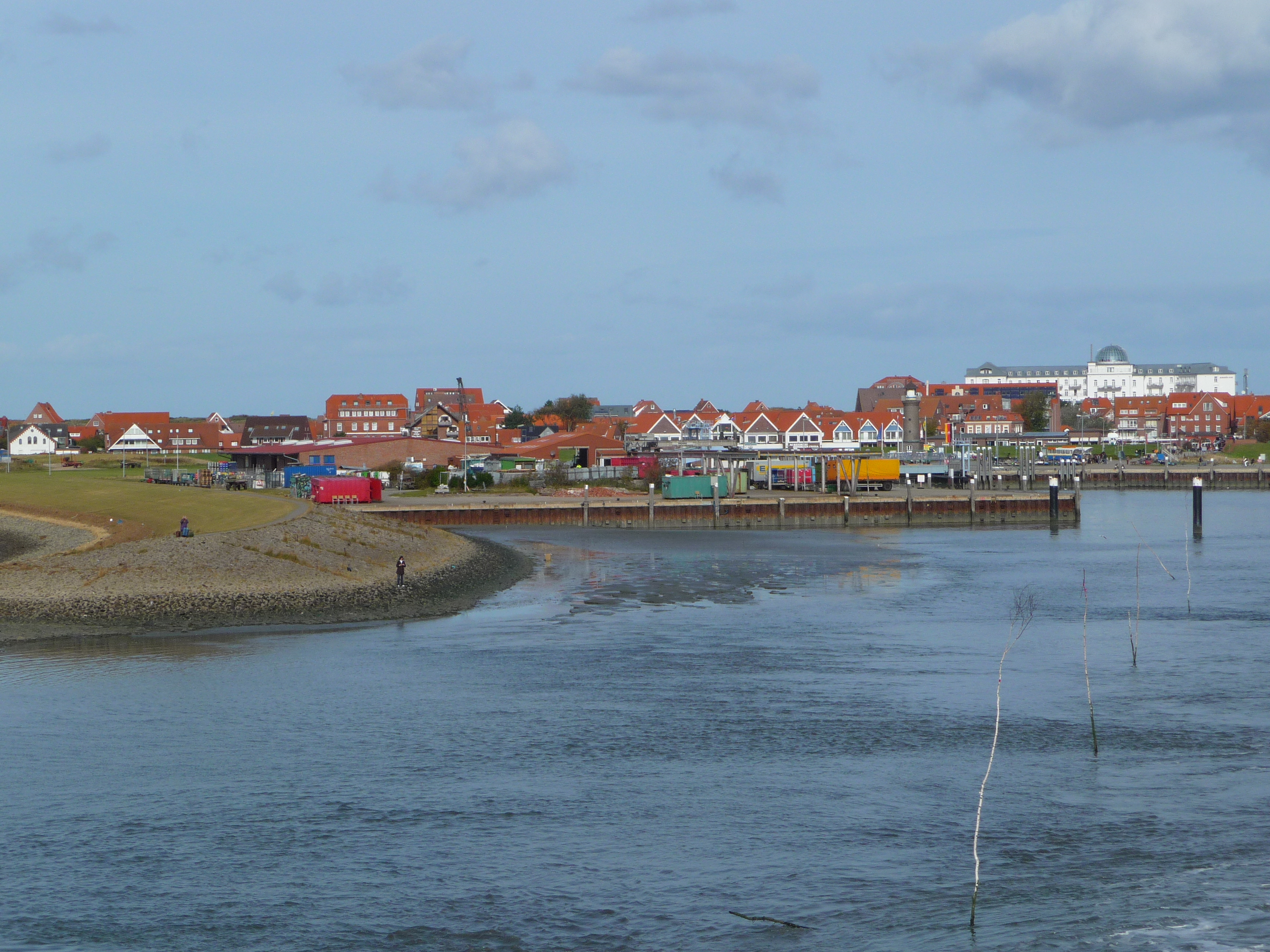
Another recurring theme is coastal people (harbour and village of Juist)

Jokes in typical question-answer format

- Why do East Frisians have flat heads? – Because when they have a drink of water, the loo seat always falls on their head!
- Why do East Frisians take a stone and a box of matches to bed? They turn the light off using the stone and light a match to see if they've actually hit the light!
- How many East Frisians does it take to milk a cow? Twenty-four. Four to hold the teats and twenty to lift the cow up and down!

Punch lines promoting East Frisians

- What do East Frisians do when the tide goes out? – They sell plots of land to Austrians!

Other forms of East Frisian joke

- Why does the tide ebb and flow? – Because when the sea saw the East Frisians, it got such a shock that it ran away. Now it returns twice a day to see if they're still there!
- From the stage act by Otto Waalkes: "The East Frisians and the Bavarians are playing football. Suddenly a train goes past nearby and whistles. The East Frisians think the game has ended and go home! (pause) Half an hour later the Bavarians score the first goal!"

== History ==
The East Frisian form of joke arose in the late 1960s and triggered one of the first large, nationwide waves of jokes in Germany. Unlike other jokes about specific people groups, the history of East Frisian jokes is fairly well known. The grammar school in Westerstede in Ammerland, a region neighbouring East Frisia, was and is attended by East Frisian pupils. As with many other nearby regions, there is frequent taunting and teasing between the peoples of East Frisia and the Ammerland. At the aforementioned school it culminated in 1968 and 1969, when the student Borwin Bandelow, who later became a famous psychiatrist, published a series in the school newspaper, Der Trompeter, called "From research and teaching." This series was about the so-called "Homo ostfrisiensis", the supposedly clumsy and stupid people of East Frisia. Wiard Raveling, himself an East Frisian and teacher at this school, published the "History of East Frisian Jokes" in book form in 1993.

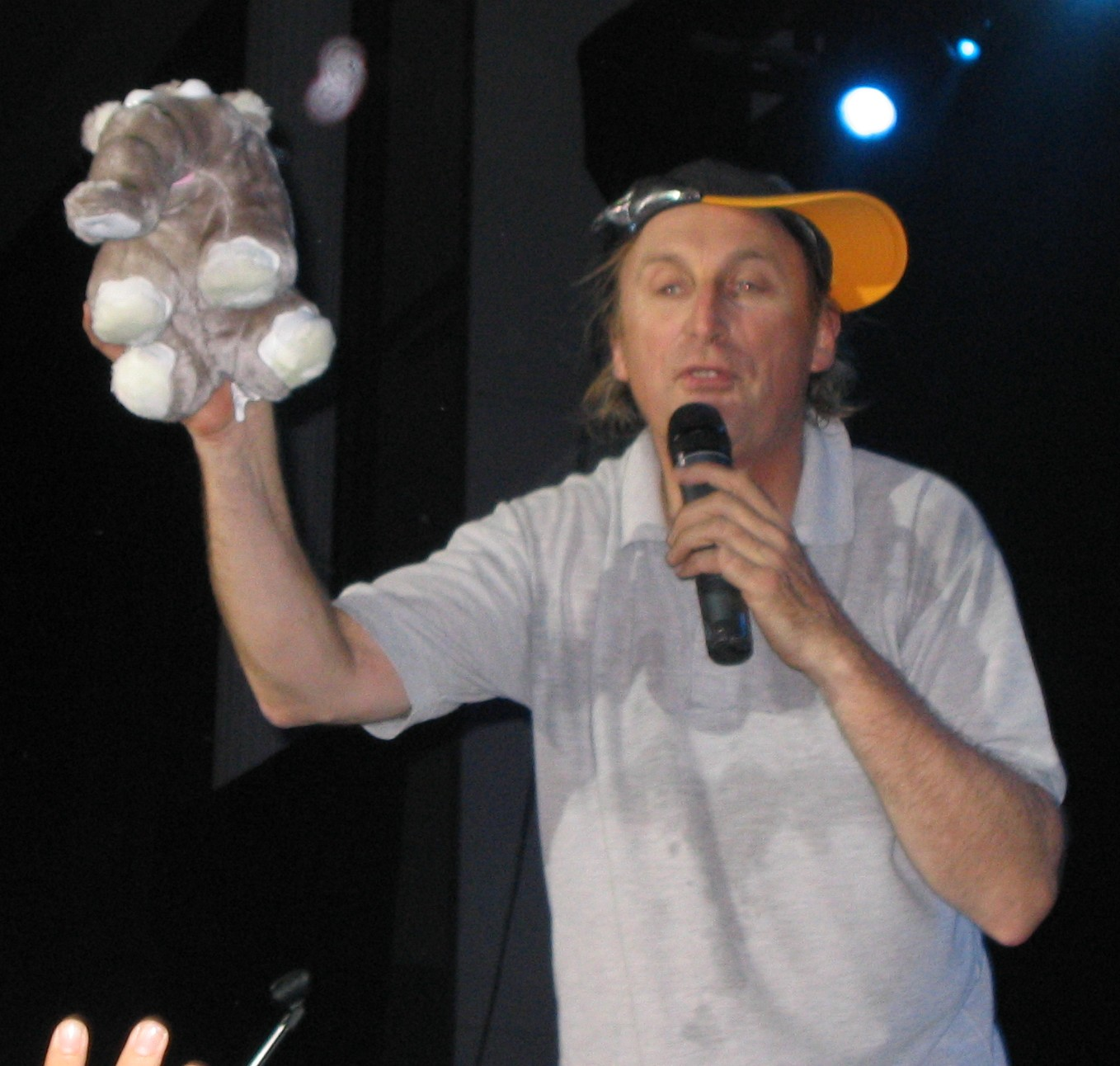
Self-portrayed stereotypical East Frisian and author of East Frisian jokes: Otto Waalkes

What followed from the series in the student newspaper, was a joke wave, which spread, first in the region, but was soon publicized on radio, newspapers and magazines in Germany. Media such as Stern or Spiegel reported on the curious neighbourhood disputes between East Frisians and Ammerlanders - and spread it by passing on the jokes. These were soon overtaken by the adaptations of the Polish jokes that had recently arisen in the 1960s in the U.S. with numerous variations, as well of jokes about other people groups.

In 1971 the East Frisian comedian and singer, Hannes Flesner, released several LPs with the then new East Frisian jokes ("East Frisia, as it laughs and sings"). Later, the two comedians from East Frisia, Otto Waalkes and Karl Dall, among others, built their careers on East Frisian jokes or the stereotype of the East Frisians and their country. Later joke waves, such as that in the 1980s about Federal Chancellor, Helmut Kohl, or those about Opel Manta drivers, or shortly thereafter about blondes in the 1990s partly took over the structure and content of the East Frisian jokes.
