= Party organizer (disambiguation) =

A party organizer is a person whose duty is to establish a local party organization.

Party organizer may also refer to:

- Partorg, a local party leader in the Communist Party of the Soviet Union
- Party Organizer, a journal of the Communist Party of the United States of America
