= Soviet phraseology =

Language traits in the Soviet Union

Soviet phraseology, or Sovietisms, i.e. the neologisms and cliches in the Russian language of the epoch of the Soviet Union, has a number of distinct traits that reflect the Soviet way of life and Soviet culture and politics. Most of these distinctions are ultimately traced (directly or indirectly, as a cause-effect chain) to the utopic goal of creating a new society, the ways of the implementation of this goal and what was actually implemented.

The topic of this article is not limited to the Russian language, since this phraseology also permeated regional languages in the Soviet Union. Nevertheless, Russian was the official language of inter-nationality communication in the Soviet Union, and was declared official language of the state in 1990, therefore it was the major source of Soviet phraseology.

== Taxonomy ==
The following main types of Sovietism coinage may be recognized:

- Semantic shift: for example, "to throw out" acquired the colloquial meaning of "to put goods for sale". In the circumstances of total consumer goods shortage, putting some goods on shelves had a character of certain suddenness, captured in the expression. "Ivan, grab your avoska, oranges have been thrown out down on the corner!" — it was not that someone jettisoned oranges; rather a makeshift stall was set up in the street to sell oranges.
- Intentional word coinage for new elements arisen in the Soviet/Eastern Bloc world, often as abbreviations and acronyms: Gosplan, KGB, gulag, kombed, agitprop, etc.
- Colloquial word coinage: khrushchovka, psikhushka.
- Stylistic cliches: "forever alive" (about Vladimir Lenin), "laboring intelligentsia", to distinguish "good" intelligentsia from "bad" intelligentsia of the past, etc.
- Political and ideological slogans Soviet people saw everyday everywhere. Often they were exploited in Russian political jokes. For example, the formula "The Party is Intelligence, Honor, and Conscience of our Epoch" was mathematically transformed into "Intelligence is party minus honor minus conscience of our epoch."
- Quite a few pejorative terms were standardized for numerous enemies of the people and other anti-Soviet subjects: "sharks of imperialism", "rootless cosmopolitans". "The whore of capitalism" was an epithet for genetics.

== Beginnings ==
An initial surge of intentional word coinage appeared immediately after the October Revolution. The declared goal of the Bolsheviks was "to abolish the capitalist state with all its means of oppression". At the same time, the instruments of the state were objectively, necessary, and they did exist, only under new names. The most notable example is People's Commissar/People's Commissariat which corresponded to minister/ministry (and in fact the latter terms were restored in 1946).

== Colloquial political humor ==
Ben Lewis wrote in his essay, book, and film (all titled Hammer & Tickle) that "Communism was a humour-producing machine. Its economic theories and system of repression created inherently funny situations. There were jokes under fascism and the Nazis too, but those systems did not create an absurd, laugh-a-minute reality like communism."

Soviet people coined irreverent definitions for their leaders. "Mineralny sekretar" was a nickname for General Secretary Mikhail Gorbachev (due to his anti-alcohol campaign). "Kukuruznik" (from kukuruza, maize) referred to Nikita Khrushchev (because of his botched introduction of maize from the United States).

== See also ==
- Newspeak
- New Soviet names
- Homo Sovieticus
- Thought reform in the People's Republic of China
- LTI – Lingua Tertii Imperii, a book that studies the way that Nazi propaganda altered the German language
