= Hammer and Tickle =

Hammer and Tickle may refer to:

- Hammer and Tickle: Clandestine Laughter in the Soviet Empire a 1980 book about Russian political jokes by Petr Beckmann
- Hammer & Tickle: The Communist Joke Book, a 2006 documentary about Russian political jokes by Ben Lewis (filmmaker)
- Hammer & Tickle. The Communist Joke Book, a 2008 book by Ben Lewis
