= Radio Yerevan joke =

Type of shortform humour in the Soviet Union and Eastern Bloc

In the Soviet Union and the former Communist Eastern bloc countries, a popular type of humour emerged in the 1950s and 1960s featuring the fictional broadcaster called the Armenian Radio (Russian: армя́нское ра́дио, romanized: armyánskoye rádio) in the USSR and Radio Yerevan elsewhere. These jokes are typically structured in a question-and-answer session with what would purportedly be the host of the actual Armenian Radio but which would often touch topics that would be sensitive for the Communist authorities or which would otherwise be liable for censorship.

Radio Yerevan jokes likely appeared from "Armenian riddles", a kind of absurdist Russian joke that was particularly popular in the post-World War II years. By the late 1950s, these jokes increasingly became political in nature and were actively lampooning the realities of the Soviet people, such as the lack of civil liberties, shortages, poor quality of household items, as well as satirizing Communist propaganda clichés. However, many of the jokes referred to other aspects of life, particularly sexual matters, and in the Soviet Union, also to stereotypical representations of Armenians. Warsaw Pact countries evolved their own nuances of Radio Yerevan jokes, such as the answers of East German ones often starting with Im Prinzip ja/nein, 'In general yes/no'. Few jokes from this cycle have been created since the fall of Communism in these states.

== History ==
Many types of question-and-answer jokes exist, and they are pretty much universal across cultures, such as lightbulb jokes. Some however, are more specific to one culture, such as elephant jokes that were an American fad in the 1960s. In the Soviet Union, a peculiar type of such jokes appeared that involved not the narrator but a fictional entity called the Armenian Radio. Despite the name, at the beginning, the Armenian Radio jokes were an ethnic Russian phenomenon. They are not really related to Armenian culture, nor do they have much in common with radio specifically. Shmelev et al. explain that the choice of the narrator was not coincidental and can be traced to "Armenian riddles" that existed since the early 20th century and featured weird questions followed by absurd answers. One of the more famous such riddles is about a herring:

— What do we call a green long thing that hangs in the living room and squeaks?

— ...?
— A herring.
— Why is it green?
— It's my herring, I can paint it any colour I want.
— Why does it hang in the living room?
— It's my herring, I can hang it wherever I want.
— Why does it squeak?

— I wonder about it myself.

Armenian riddles, in their turn, likely were preceded by Russian jokes popular in early 20th century that featured an Armenian, or a Georgian, answering questions (that were often asked by the Armenian/Georgian himself) in a silly way. Emil Draitser generally concurs with the assessment, further adding that the Armenian riddles saw a revival in the immediate post-World War II years. First "Armenian Radio" jokes themselves appeared either in late 1950s or in the 1960s. The "radio" part was likely chosen because at the time of their appearance, radio was the most popular mass media outlet in the Soviet Union and also because radio stations often scheduled programs during which hosts answered questions purportedly mailed by radio listeners (though virtually everybody suspected the questions were written by hosts themselves so as to give ideologically appropriate answers to them). An alternative explanation relies on an apocryphal story suggesting that a host of an actual Radio Yerevan made a gaffe during a program when saying that "In a capitalist society, man exploits man, but in a Communist society it's the other way round."

The rise of Armenian Radio jokes in particular, or Communist jokes in general, could be attributed to more lenient attitudes towards manifestations of "anti-Soviet agitation". During Stalin's rule, doing that could land a jokester in a Gulag or prison; in the early Khrushchev years, people were still sentenced to prison time for such offences, but by early 1960s all Communist states abandoned prosecution and arrests for such low-key dissent. At the same time, Communist propaganda, poor quality of life and (in Soviet satellite states) de facto lack of sovereignty made for ripe targets for satire. Another factor was that the Communist-approved mass media produced little of humour content, so much of the jokes circulating in public were not state-sanctioned and were created on the go by the people themselves.

New Armenian Radio jokes generally stopped appearing by the late 1980s, but some are still occasionally created today.

== Themes ==
The common feature of Radio Yerevan jokes is presenting a rather provocative or absurd question, followed by a witty answer. Armenian Radio jokes are diverse in their topics. There are, however, some similarities. More than half of Russian jokes start with "May" or "Can" questions, which are in general not Rhetorical. When asked about suggested conduct, "Should" is often used at the beginning, as in "Should a Communist pay party dues from a bribe?" (Answer: If they are honest, they should.) Answers are varied but even in a seemingly innocuous question, Radio Yerevan will generally find a risqué answer with an either political or sexual subtext. For a political example, Radio Yerevan defined a string quartet as the "Moscow's symphonic orchestra as it returns from a concert tour abroad", a snide remark referring to highly educated Soviet citizens defecting to the West.

In fact, many Radio Yerevan jokes are political in nature. In these cases, the radio conveys the opinion of a typical Soviet man cynical of the Soviet government. They are a veiled criticism or satire on poor quality of life that is at odds with assurances from the propaganda apparatus. The jokes will sometimes mock Communist propaganda clichés, as in agreeing that the United States are on the edge of the precipice, but "the Soviets are a step ahead of them". These jokes will also make puns of the lack of civil liberties. The answer will often seemingly agree with the listener at first but then also introduce the "but" that completely turns the initial answer on its head. For example:

Listener: Is it true that socialism is the shining example of the golden age?
Radio Yerevan: Indeed, but all that glitters is not gold.

Particularly in Russian, the remainder of the jokes typically revolve around sexual matters (e.g. "What to do if my dick will only point to my shoes?" "Put them on top of a cupboard"), sometimes portraying the (Armenian) host as having a predilection for homosexuality, pedophilia and fat women. Some jokes will also refer to laziness and/or attempts to earn money outside the official (Soviet) economy. There are also ethnic jokes referring to traits stereotypically ascribed to Armenians, such as tensions with neighbouring Georgia and Azerbaijan, and Armenian nationalism:

What is the most beautiful city in the Soviet Union?
Yerevan, obviously.
How many nuclear bombs will it take to destroy Yerevan?
Baku is also a beautiful city.

== See also ==
- Russian jokes
  - Russian political jokes
- East German jokes
