= Ossi and Wessi =

Names for former East and West German citizens

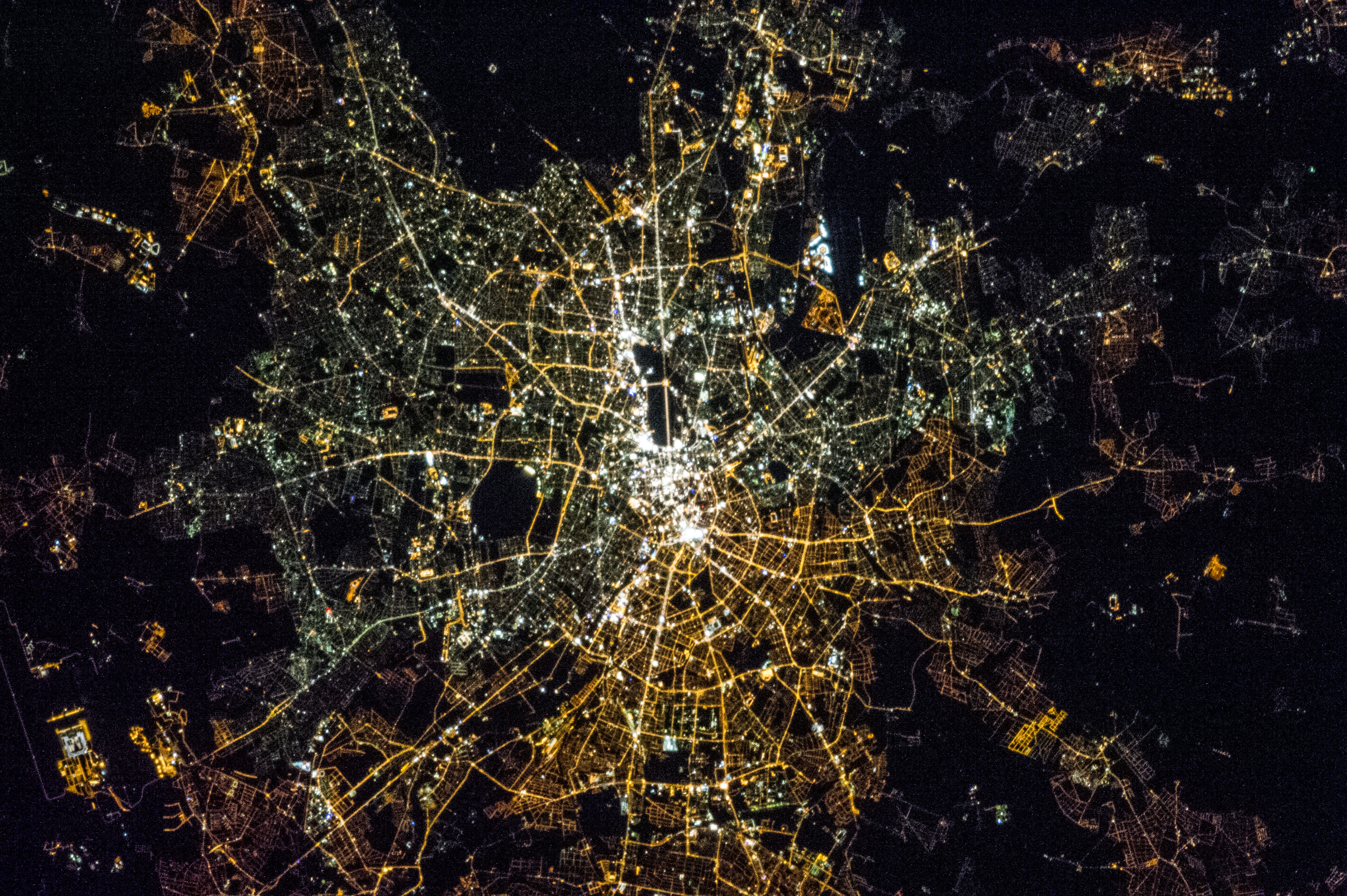
East and West Berlin, as pictured in 2013 using different night lighting

Ossi and Wessi (German pronunciation: [ˈɔsiː] – "easterner"; German pronunciation: [ˈvɛsiː] – "westerner") are the informal names that people in Germany call former citizens of East Germany and West Germany before re-unification (1945–1990). These names represent the lingering differences between the two pre-reunification cultures, and Germany's popular culture includes many Ossi-Wessi-jokes and clichés. While some people in Germany may consider these names insulting, others regard them as part of the German culture.

There is also the name Besserwessi (besser meaning "better") which is a pun on Besserwisser ("know-it-all") and thus indicates a Wessi who feels superior to Ossis. Some former East Germans feel that former West Germans do not respect their culture and that East Germans were assimilated into West German culture, rather than the two cultures being united as equals. These people are sometimes called Jammerossis (as in yammering, complaining). This term was named German Word of the Year in 1991.

Politically speaking, in the German Reunification, the East German GDR dissolved itself, reorganised into five new states of Germany that acceded into West German Federal Republic of Germany according to Artikel 23 of the "Basic Law for the Federal Republic of Germany" (Grundgesetz). This solution, having been was taken to quickly complete the process. The final Artikel 146 of the Grundgesetz calls for a constitution adopted by the German people in a free decision.

Since the reunification, the term Wossi (a portmanteau of Ossi and Wessi) has been used to describe West Germans who after reunification have moved to the East. In 2019, Christian Bangel observed the growing political influence of Wossis in federal politics, as numerous politicians socialized in West Germany live in Potsdam. Examples include former Federal Chancellor Olaf Scholz (born in Osnabrück, former Lord Mayor of Hamburg), Foreign Minister Annalena Baerbock (born in Hannover) and AfD politician Alexander Gauland (born in Chemnitz, fled to Marburg, returned to Potsdam after reunification). Björn Höcke, leader of the Thuringia AfD is a Wossi, born in West Germany in 1972 into a family that had been expelled from East Prussia, and grown up in the West. He worked as a teacher in Hesse but moved into nearby Thuringia, and since has built his entire political prominence as an eastern political figure.

== See also ==
- New states of Germany
- East-German jokes
- Ostalgie
