= Riddle joke =

Type of riddle

A riddle joke, joke riddle, pseudo-joke, or conundrum is a riddle that does not expect the asked person to know the answer, but rather constitutes a set-up to the humorous punch line of the joke.

It is one of the four major types of riddles, according to Nigel F. Barley. There are many cycles of jokes in the form of a conundrum, such as elephant jokes, "Why did the chicken cross the road?" and lightbulb jokes.

Joke cycles implying inferiority or other stereotypes of certain categories of people, such as blonde jokes or ethnic jokes (such as Polack jokes), have a considerable number of joke riddles.

== Types ==
- Elephant joke
- Lightbulb joke
- Newspaper riddle
- "Why did the chicken cross the road?"
- Radio Yerevan jokes

=== Abstraction ===
In areas which have historical ties with Asia Minor, such as Greece, Turkey, Armenia, of popularity are "abstract riddles" that follow templates: "What is this: A inside and B outside?" or "What is this: A is around and B in the middle?". For example:

Q: What is fur outside and cotton inside?
A: A poodle in front of a drugstore with cotton swabs on sale.

Q: What is water around and the law in the middle?
A: Judge Karapetyan in his pool.

Q: What is meat outside and iron inside?
A: Tailor Hovhannes having swallowed a needle.

== See also ==
- Riddle-tale
- Trick question
