= Why did the chicken cross the road? =

Common joke or riddle

"Why did the chicken cross the road?" is a common riddle joke with the answer being "To get to the other side." It is an example of anti-humor, in that the curious setup of the joke leads the listener to expect a traditional punchline, but they are instead given a simple statement of fact. The joke has become iconic as an exemplary generic joke to which most people know the answer, and has been repeated and changed numerous times over the course of history.

A chicken crossing the road

== History ==
The riddle appeared in an 1847 edition of The Knickerbocker, a New York City monthly magazine:

There are 'quips and quillets' which seem actual conundrums, but yet are none. Of such is this: 'Why does a chicken cross the street?' Are you 'out of town?' Do you 'give it up?' Well, then: 'Because it wants to get on the other side!'

According to music critic Gary Giddins in the Ken Burns documentary Jazz, the joke was spread through the United States by minstrel shows beginning in the 1840s as one of the first national jokes.

In the 1890s, a pun variant version appeared in the magazine Potter's American Monthly:

Why should not a chicken cross the road? It would be a fowl proceeding.

== Variations ==
There are many riddles that assume a familiarity with this well-known riddle and its answer. For example, an alternate punchline can be used for the riddle, such as "it was too far to walk around". One class of variations enlists a creature other than the chicken to cross the road, in order to refer back to the original riddle. For example, a duck (or turkey) crosses "because it was the chicken's day off", and a dinosaur crosses "because chickens didn't exist yet". Some variants are both puns and references to the original, such as "Why did the duck cross the road? To prove he's no chicken".

Other variations replace side with another word often to form a pun. Some examples are:

"Why did the chicken cross the road? To get to the idiot's house. ... Knock-knock." ("Who's there?") "The chicken."

"Why did the chicken cross the playground? To get to the other slide."

"Why did the chewing gum cross the road? It was stuck to the chicken's foot."

"Why did the whale cross the ocean? To get to the other tide."

"Why did Darth Vader cross the road? To get to the Dark Side."

"Why did the chicken cross the Möbius strip? To get to the same side."

In the film Toy Story 2, while the search party of Andy's toys is looking for the toy store Al's Toy Barn—which has a chicken statue in its façade—Hamm announces he has spotted it on the other side of the street by asking the riddle "Why did the toys cross the road?", to which he answers "To get to the chicken on the other side!"

As with the lightbulb joke, variants on these themes are widespread.
