= Trick question =

Question that confuses the person asked

A trick question is a question that confuses the person asked. This can be either because it is difficult to answer or because an obvious answer is not a correct one. They include puzzles, riddles and brain teasers.

The term "trick question" may also refer the fallacy of presupposition, also known as the complex question: it is a question that has a complex presupposition. Example: "Who is the King of France?" - the question indirectly assumes that France has a King.

An example of a trick question many people get wrong goes as follows: "A bat and ball cost $1.10. The bat costs one dollar more than the ball. How much does the ball cost?" As behavioral economist Daniel Kahneman reported in his 2011 book Thinking, Fast and Slow, the majority of students of Harvard, MIT and Princeton answered "10¢" - an answer that is intuitive, appealing, and wrong. At less ranked universities the error rate could exceed 80%. Kahelman explained this with an observation common to many trick questions: "many people are overconfident, prone to place too much faith in their intuitions. They apparently find cognitive effort at least mildly unpleasant and avoid it as much as possible".

Dennis M. Roberts carried out a study of what constitutes a trick question during an exam. Some testers intentionally include a couple trick questions, for various reasons. For example, test taking had become a skill in itself, without studying the material in-depth.

An example that tests whether the question was read carefully: "When a plane crashes on the border between the United States and Canada, where are the survivors buried"? Here the trick item is an inconspicuous word easily overlooked by the examinee. Hopkins et al. advise against such kind of questions during tests. Other types of trick question contain a word that appears to be irrelevant, but in fact provides a clue.

Luke 20 contains what is described as a "trick question" of Sadducees to Jesus:

Then some of the Sadducees, who deny that there is a resurrection, came to Him and asked Him, saying: “Teacher, Moses wrote to us that if a man’s brother dies, having a wife, and he dies without children, his brother should take his wife and raise up offspring for his brother. (Note: in accordance with the Mosaic rule of levirate marriage prescribed by Deuteronomy 25:5) Now there were seven brothers. And the first took a wife, and died without children. And the second took her as wife, and he died childless. Then the third took her, and in like manner the seven also; and they left no children, and died. Last of all the woman died also. Therefore, in the resurrection, whose wife does she become? For all seven had her as wife.”

(The answer of Jesus essentially points out that life after death is not a mere continuation of the current life.)

== See also ==
- Riddle joke
