= Newspaper riddle =

Riddle joke

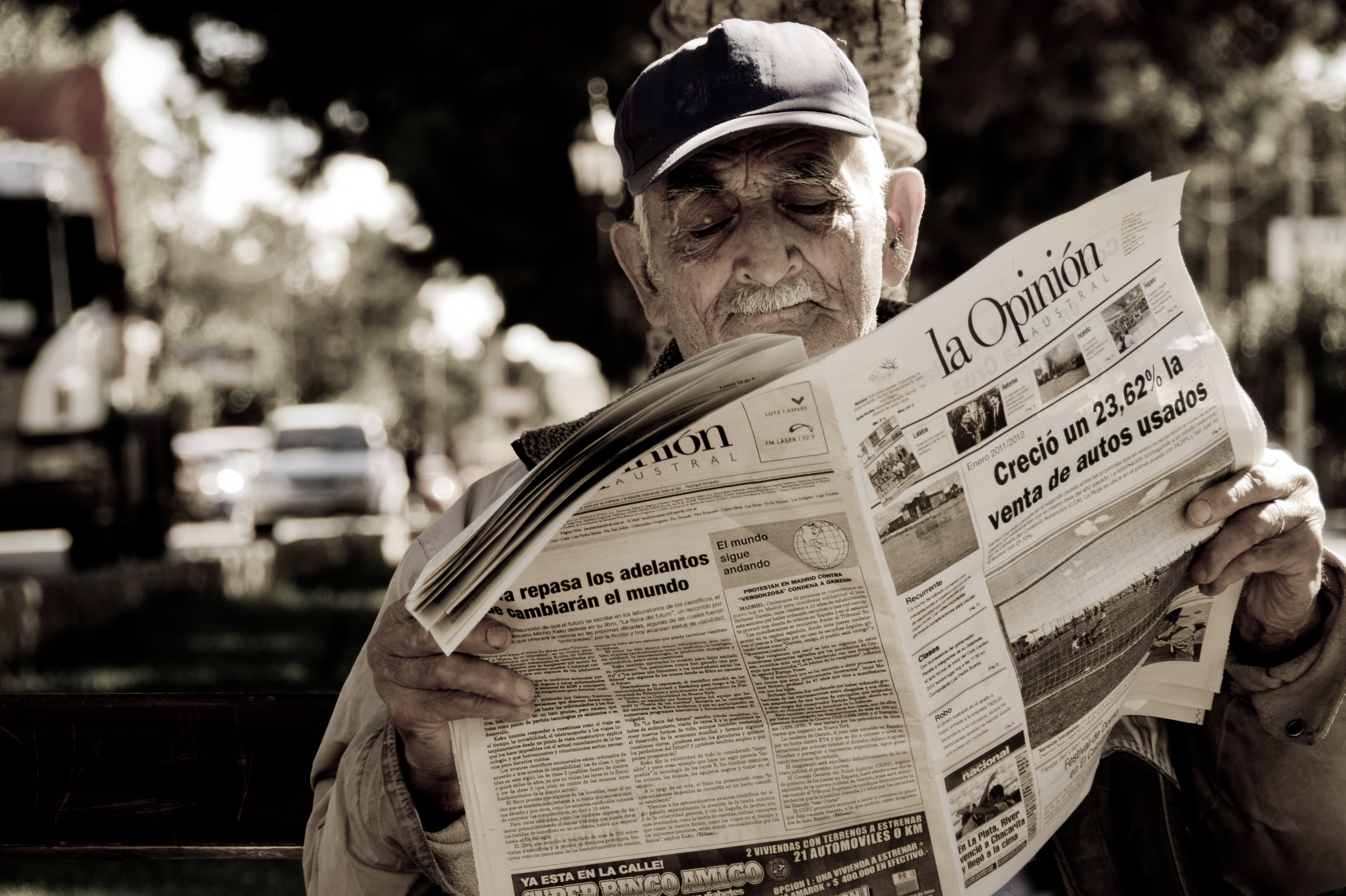
A black and white newspaper that is "read" all over

The newspaper riddle is a riddle joke or conundrum in English that begins with the question:

Q: What is black and white and red all over?

The traditional answer, which relies upon the identical pronunciation of the words "red" and "read", is:

A: A newspaper.

Barrick believes this riddle to be "perhaps the most common example of a folk riddle collected in the United States in the twentieth century", pointing out that between 1917 and 1939 it appeared in 15 collections of folk riddles, and in a further six between 1939 and 1974.

Alternative answers to the riddle exist, where red is used as a color, parodying the canonical form of the riddle. Examples include: "a chocolate sundae with ketchup on top", "a badger in a blender", "a crossword done in red ink", and "a penguin with a sunburn". Portnoy describes these answers as "adequate, but not clever", because they lack the homophonic pun.

A much darker version of the riddle exists with the answer "a wounded nun." This is also the answer to the similar riddle "What's black and white and crawls on all fours?"

== Translations ==
In The Language of Jokes, Delia Chiaro notes that it is, technically, impossible to translate this joke into languages other than English, pointing out that, for example, in French, Italian, and German the words "rouge", "rosso", and "rot" have no meaning other than "red" and do not possess homophones.

She adds that it is possible to translate the intent of the joke, and to retain the invariant core of the colour red and the reference to a newspaper, by substituting a different riddle that relies upon metaphor, albeit that the homophonic play upon words is lost. She gives the following example in French, which relies upon the facts that L'Humanité is the newspaper of the French Communist Party, and that, as "red" has in English, "rouge" in French has political connotations of Communism:

Q: Qu'est-ce qui/Quel journal est tout rouge et noir et blanc?
A: L'Humanité

She also gives a similar example in Italian, this time using the newspaper of the Italian Communist Party (L'Unità), noting that in Italian the order of black and white is the reverse of that in English and "rosso" must come first:

Q: Quale giornale è rosso, bianco e nero?
A: L'Unità

For German, she gives this example, which again, like Italian, requires the colour adjectives to be in a different order:

Q: Was ist rot, schwarz und weiss?
A: Die Tageszeitung

== Famous uses ==
The joke is used as the opening lines of the 1988 song "Newspaper Mama" by Australian children's musician Peter Combe.

In 2009, Jason Jones pitched this riddle to Bill Keller, the editor of The New York Times, giving the answer: "Your balance sheet".

Jimmy Kimmel at the 2012 White House Correspondent's Dinner did this joke and replied: "Nothing anymore", in an allusion to the death of print news.

== See also ==
- Elephant joke
