= Farmers' lore jokes =

German joke cycle

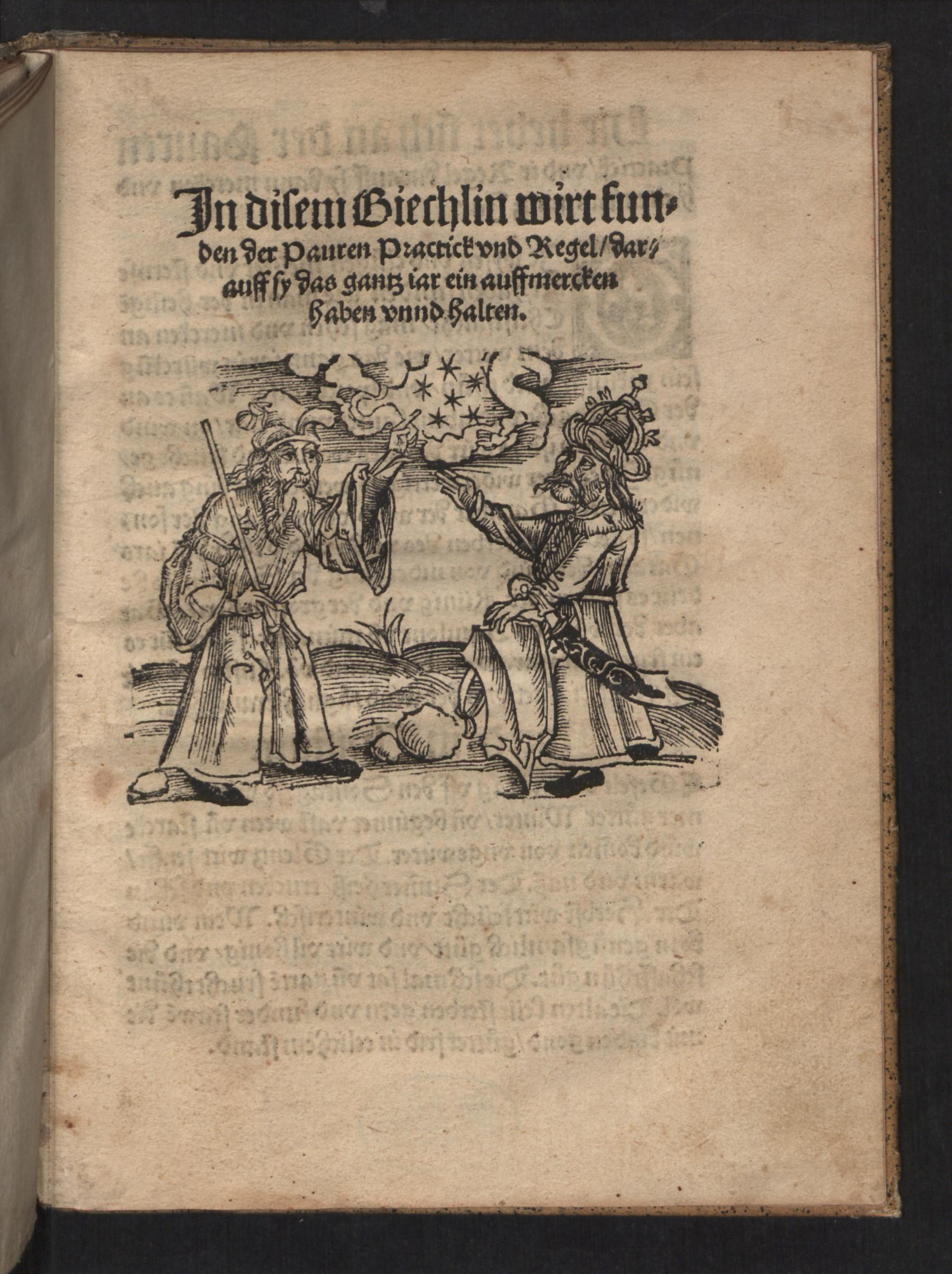
A 16th century book of real Bauernregeln

Farmers' lore jokes (German: Bauernregeln Witze, lustige Bauernregeln) is a category of German humour. They are a parody of the weather lore, or farmers' lore, and are told in its traditional rhymed style. There are two variants: one is really about weather, but the rule is absurd or tautologous; the other can be about any other topic, makes some sense, often has sexual connotations, and may feature word play or some real, hidden or twisted wisdom.

Wenn noch im November steht das Korn, dann isses wohl vergesse worn (If the corn still stands in November, it's something the farmer didn't remember).

Ists an Silvester hell und klar, dann ist am nächsten Tag Neujahr (If Sylvester is light and clear, the next day'll surely be New Year).

Regnet es im Juli in den Roggen, bleibt der Weizen auch nicht trocken! (If it rains on the rye in July, then the wheat will not be dry.)

Liegt der Bauer tot im Zimmer, lebt er nimmer (If the farmer lies dead in a room, he lives no more).

Wenn der Bauer zum Waldrand hetzt, war das Plumpsklo schon besetzt. - "If a farmer rushes to the woods, the outhouse is occupied."

In fact, while many real Bauernregeln sound funny, they carry the grain of truth, so sometimes it is hard to tell, whether it is a parody or an ancient wisdom:

Hört Waltraud nicht den Kuckuck schrein, dann muss er wohl erfroren sein ("If by Waltrude the cuckoo is not heard, it is probably frozen and dead.")

Referering to April 19, the feast day of Saint Waltrude, this wit alludes to the possibility of a snapback of cold in April

Wenn der Hahn kräht auf dem Mist, dann ändert sich das Wetter, oder es bleibt wie es ist. (When the rooster crows on the dung heap, the weather will either change or stay as it is.)

A poke at the non-reliability of weather forecasts.

Wird es Frühling da und dorten, riecht es streng von den Aborten. ("(It must be that) Spring is here in the street: it really smells like outhouse shit.")

Indeed, in the countryside spring brings the smells not only of flowers a-blooming, but of outhouses thawing.

Bauernregeln humour is used by a number of comedy shows and comedians, including Die Harald Schmidt Show, Günter Willumeit, "Sepp Schnorcher" character played by Christian Schwab at the Ö3-Wecker radio programme, who parodied Austrian Sepp Forcher's Klingendes Österreich. TV presenter Hellmuth Henneberg once joked: "I only believe in one rule: 'If it rains in May, April is over!'" ("Wenn es regnet im Mai, ist der April vorbei!")

In February 2017, the Federal Ministry of the Environment (BMU) published 11 "New Farming Rules" on its website and on posters at the start of a campaign to draw attention to problems with conventional agriculture "in a playful and humorous way". These include sayings such as "If the pig stands on one leg, the pigsty is too small", or "If poison hits the plants, the birds remain silent". This led to protests by the farmers' associations, who felt defamed. This had led to an apology to the farmers and the suspension of the campaign.
