= German humour =

Humour considered typical for Germany

German humour is the conventions of comedy and its cultural meaning within German-speaking countries. German humour encompasses traditions such as Kabarett and other forms of satire as well as more recent trends such as TV shows and stand-up comedy.

== Media ==
Feuerzangenbowle (1944) is aired every silvester and during Christmastime on TV alongside Dinner for One (1963).

There are German comedic adventure games, such as Edna & Harvey: The Breakout and the Deponia.

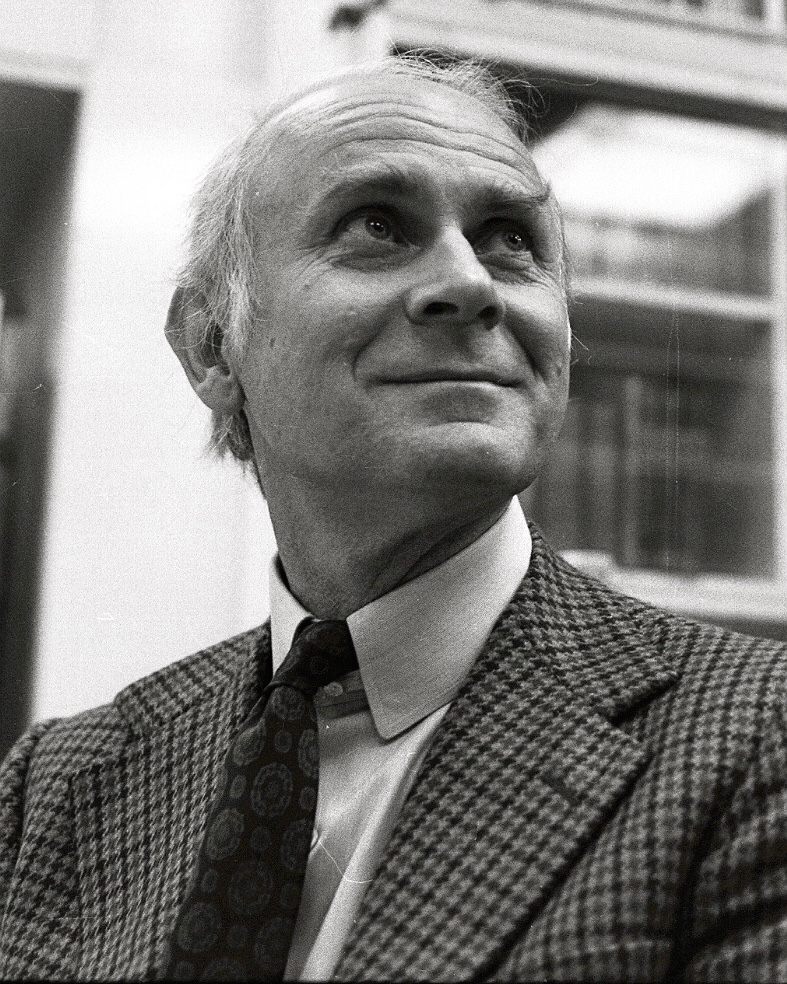
Loriot, an icon of refined German humour († 2011)

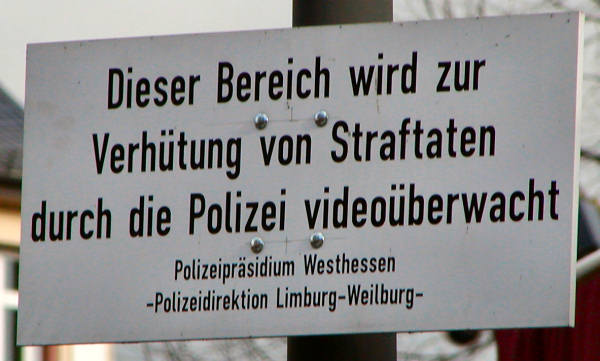
Humour through syntactic ambiguity: the sentence depicted is intended to mean "this area is under video surveillance by the police to prevent crimes", but also means "this area is under video surveillance to prevent crimes committed by the police".

== Foreign perception ==
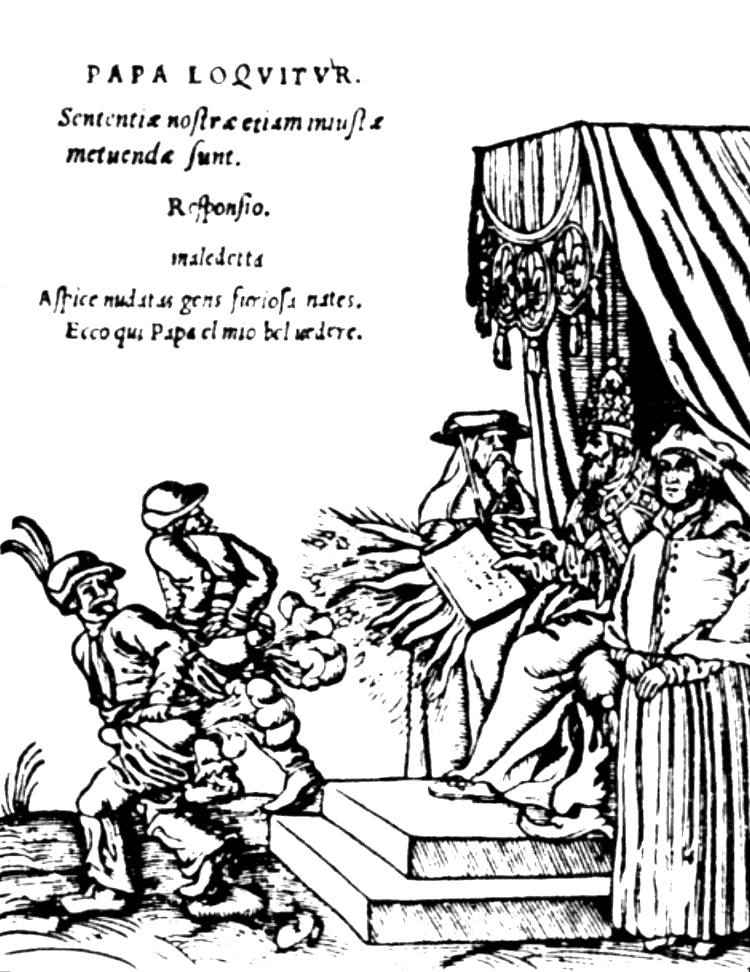
From a series of woodcuts dated to 1545, usually referred to in German as the Papstspotbilder or Papstspottbilder, and in English as Depictions of the Papacy, by Lucas Cranach, commissioned by Martin Luther. Title: Kissing the Pope's Feet. (Note: In Latin, the title reads "Hic oscula pedibus papae figuntur".) German peasants respond to a papal bull of Pope Paul III. Caption reads: "Don't frighten us Pope, with your ban, and don't be such a furious man. Otherwise we shall turn around and show you our rears." (Note: "Nicht Bapst: nicht schreck uns mit deim ban, Und sey nicht so zorniger man. Wir thun sonst ein gegen wehre, Und zeigen dirs Bel vedere")

Germans being stiff and humorless and German humor being dull and dry has become a popular German stereotype that is said to have originated from World War I atrocity propaganda and spread from Great Britain to other English-speaking countries. The stereotype is virtually unknown outside the Anglosphere and still most prevalent in Britain. British media continued perpetuating world war stereotypes of Germans in the 21^{st} century. The BBC justifies "people thinking Germans aren't funny" and shifts the blame to the German language with questionable explanations like compound words not having spaces in German. The "humorless" stereotype is often retold in US-American media too. For example in the South Park episode Funnybot or by the comedian Robin Williams.

Wrong stereotypes about Germans having a fixation on feces including in humor also continue to be perpetuated in English.

In a popular but criticised article in 2006, English comedian Stewart Lee claimed misconceptions about German humour among English speakers might derive from linguistic differences such as German leaving less room for confusion-based humor. Some jokes do not translate well because grammatical differences can rearrange a punchline.

There has been harsh criticism of Lee's views, especially from academics. Linguist Mark Liberman states that in trying to eliminate stereotypes about German humour, Lee himself falls victim to "ethnic prejudice and [...] incoherent linguistic analyses" by basing his "opinions on unsupported and unexamined national stereotypes". Liberman also finds many possibilities for a "pull back and reveal" joke structure in German language.

Some popular old German children's book like Struwwelpeter or Max and Moritz contain black humor and are often seen as too brutal by English-speakers and sometimes explicitly mocked in English media. For example in Family Guy and The Office.

== See also ==
- Cologne Comedy Festival
- Kabarett

=== German joke cycles ===
- East Frisian jokes
- East German jokes
- Farmers' lore jokes
- Manta joke
- Little Erna
- Whisper joke
