= Hammer & Tickle =

- Theatrical release poster
- Directed by: Ben Lewis
- Written by: Ben Lewis
- Produced by: Christine Camdessus, Leah Mallen
- Narrated by: Ben Lewis
- Edited by: Jules Cornell
- Release date: 2006
- Running time: 89 min.
- Country: United States
- Language: English

Hammer & Tickle: The Communist Joke Book is a 2006 documentary film about the nature of Russian political jokes under the powerful and socially restrictive Communist regime of the Soviet Union and its satellite nations. The film's name exemplifies the kind of mockery or criticism of the regime that the Soviet government would have found to be disagreeable, by playing on the symbol of communism, the hammer and sickle. The film tells the story of the power that jokes had to enable social and political change and advance personal freedoms from within the USSR - the film's opening scene uses a quote from George Orwell's 1984: "Every joke is a tiny revolution."

== Content ==
Under the watchful eyes of the oppressive Soviet government, the Russian people had very few outlets in which they could publicly express their disapproval of their government and its policies. The film shows the story of how jokes served as an outlet for the people's expression of their desire for reform and freedom. These jokes were often told quietly to one another, as to avoid retribution from the Soviet secret police agencies who kept a close eye on such expressions of political dissent. Oftentimes, however, even private and seemingly benign displays of such dissent could not escape detection. Eva Kovacs of the Secret Police Archives in Hungary tells the story of a university student who spent two years in prison and had all his possessions confiscated after telling an unseemly joke about Comrade Rákosi.

In an interview with Ilie Merce, former Colonel of the Communist Romanian secret police agency Securitate, Merce says that his agency paid particular attention to jokes about the lack of availability of basic products and the censorship of television, as they "functioned as indicators of the spirit of the people."

On several occasions, the film shows U.S. President Ronald Reagan poking fun at the Soviet Union's shortcomings, highlighting how he too used humor to sway public opinion.

== Reception ==
Hammer & Tickle premiered at the Tribeca Film Festival in 2006 to positive reviews, and won the title of "Best Documentary" at the Zurich Film Festival later that year.

Lewis published an essay (in Prospect Magazine, 2006) and book (Weidenfeld & Nicolson, 2008) with the same title.

== See also ==
- Soviet phraseology
