= Manta joke =

Stereotype joke about Opel Manta drivers

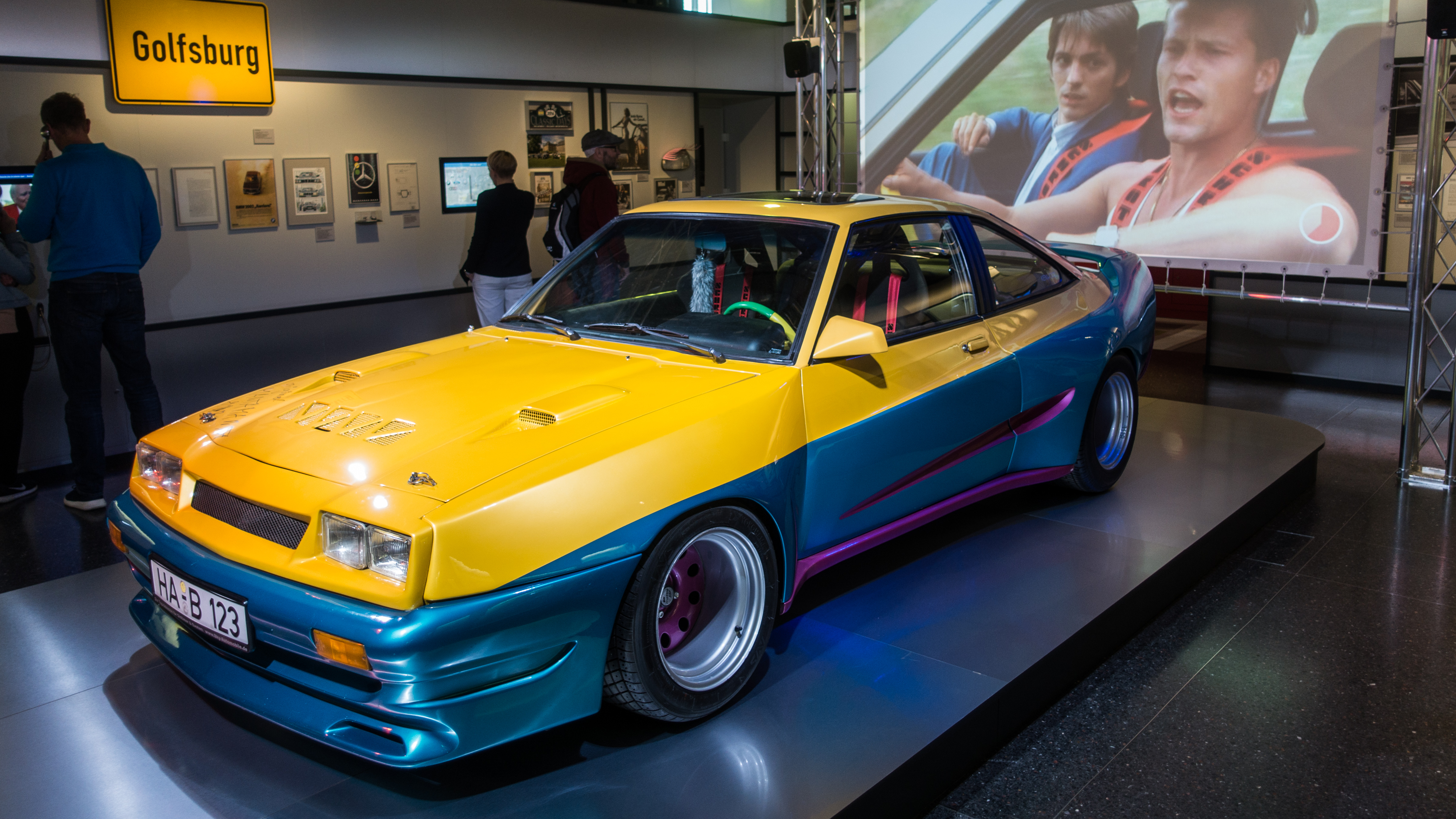
Opel Manta B from film Manta, Manta

In German humour, Manta jokes (German: Mantawitze) is a joke cycle about the Mantafahrer ("Manta driver"), the male owner of an Opel Manta. His name is usually Manni (short for Manfred), who is an aggressive driver, lower class (typically from the Ruhrpott), macho, of lower intelligence, and infatuated with both his car and his blonde hairdresser girlfriend.

A Mantafahrer drives with his elbow sticking out of the window, therefore the driver's side door is always rusty from the underarm sweat. His car is always lowered, tuned and decorated with a foxtail on the aerial and a "Kenwood" sticker on the rear window. The Manta owners also have a rivalry with Volkswagen Golf GTi owners ("Golfkrieg", which in German also means "Gulf War"), often racing them.

His education level is generally at most limited to Hauptschule, where he may have had to repeat several classes, and he likes to use interjections "Ey" and "Boah". When speaking to women, he shows extremely direct flirting behaviour ("Ey, ficken?").

Jokes poke fun at a stereotype of the working class owner of a second-tier muscle car, typified by the Manta. Mantas were targeted at buyers who yearned for a sports car but could not afford a status car such as a BMW or Mercedes. Proud Manta owners often decorated them with chrome, racing stripes, alloy wheels, racing tyres, or high beams to mimic the exclusiveness of race cars.

The popularity of such jokes spawned two successful comedy films in 1991 - Manta – Der Film and Manta, Manta, the latter starring Til Schweiger as a Mantafahrer. Also, in the 2 March 1991 episode of Wetten, dass..?, in a bet in the studio, ten Manta drivers showed up to the studio, all of them named Manni and had a partner who worked as a hairdresser. At the end of 1990s, oil company DEA had an advertising campaign where a stereotypical Manta driver named Ingo pulls up at a filling station, and is told "Super, Ingo" by everyone. He mistakes them for compliments, but realizes that it was actually meant as a warning not to fill up his car with diesel, but with Super petrol (in Germany, 91 octane petrol is named Normal, 95 Super and 98 Super Plus).

Example jokes are:

- What was left after a fatal Manta accident? - A gold chain and a hairdresser in mourning. - And why was the funeral held on Monday? - Because that's the hairdresser's day off.
- What is the shortest Manta joke ever? - Ein Manta steht vor der Uni (A Manta parked in front of a university).
- What does a Manta driver say after crashing into a tree? – Komisch--hab doch gehupt! ("That's strange -- I honked!")

== See also ==
- Russian jokes: New Russians
- Boy racer
- Hoon
- Mondeo man
- New Kids
- Rice burner
- White van man
