= Elephant joke =

Type of absurd joke involving an elephant

An elephant joke is a joke cycle, almost always an absurd riddle or conundrum and often a sequence of such, that involves an elephant. Elephant jokes were a fad in the 1960s, with many people constructing large numbers of them according to a set formula. Sometimes they involve parodies or puns.

An example of an elephant joke is:

Q: Why did the elephant paint its toenails red?
A: So it could hide in a cherry tree.

== History ==
In 1960, L. M. Becker Co of Appleton, Wisconsin, released a set of 50 trading cards titled "Elephant Jokes". They were recorded in mid-1962 in Texas and gradually spread across the US, reaching California in early 1963. By July 1963, elephant jokes were ubiquitous and could be found in newspaper columns, and in Time and Seventeen magazines, with millions of people working to construct more jokes according to the same formula.

Both elephant jokes and Tom Swifties were in vogue in 1963, and were reported in the US national press. While Tom Swifties were marketed to literate adults and gradually fell out of fashion over subsequent decades, elephant jokes have lasted among younger audiences, circulating through generations of schoolchildren.

Prolific science fiction writer Isaac Asimov was of the opinion that these jokes are "favorites of youngsters and of unsophisticated adults". However, he finds one joke uncharacteristically sophisticated enough to include in his book of favorite jokes. The joke was told in the aftermath of the murder of Lee Harvey Oswald by Jack Ruby, who had walked into Dallas police headquarters carrying a gun:

Q: What did the Dallas chief of police say when the elephant walked into the police station?
A: Nothing! He didn't notice.

== Structure ==
Elephant jokes rely upon absurdity and incongruity for their humor, and a contrast with the normal presumptions of knowledge about elephants. They rely upon absurdist reasoning such as that it would be the relatively incidental evidence regarding the smell of an elephant's breath or the presence of footprints in the butter that would allow for the detection of an elephant in one's bathtub or refrigerator. One key to the construction of an elephant joke is that the joke answers are somewhat appropriate if one merely overlooks the obvious absurdities inherent to the questions. If elephants were capable of climbing trees and if painting an elephant's toenails was an effective camouflage mechanism, then red would be the appropriate color for a cherry tree. If the common connotation that questions requesting the time are expected to be answered in terms of hours and minutes is ignored, then by the implied destruction of one's fence from being sat on by an elephant, it would be time to build a new fence. The appropriateness of the answer, when accounting for the absurd incongruences existing between the implied premise of the question and the normal assumptions said question invokes, distinguishes elephant jokes as jokes rather than nonsensical riddles.

=== As a riddle ===
Elephant jokes are often parodies of conventional children's riddles. Consider the following commonly recited child's riddle:

Q: What is black and white and red all over?
A: A newspaper.

Traditionally the challenge of solving this riddle relies on recognizing the ambiguity stemming from the riddle being generally shared aloud as opposed to in writing. Thus the appropriate homophone, "red" or "read", must be inferred. If "red" is assumed, then the problem arises regarding whether or not any object satisfying the condition of being "red all over" would necessarily preclude said object from also satisfying the requirement of being "black and white". However, if instead "read" is assumed, then there is no implied mutual exclusivity preventing a solution, conventionally a newspaper, from satisfying both required conditions. Compare the traditional riddle, which is solved by a well-known item that can be reasonably determined from the riddle, with the elephant joke parody:

Q: What is black and white and red all over?
A: An elephant dressed as a nun suffering from sunburn.

The absurdity of an elephant wearing a nun costume makes it nearly impossible for anyone not familiar with the punchline to independently think of the parody answer. Ignoring how unlikely one is to ever encounter an elephant dressed as a nun, then the answer is somewhat appropriate. A nun costume would likely be both "black and white" and a sunburn would cause an elephant to be, somewhat, "red all over". Humor arises from the irony of ignoring the expected answer for the outlandish, yet appropriate, elephant answer.

A turnabout to the "Blind men and an elephant" parable is a joke about four blind elephants who feel a human. The first reports that humans are flat, and the other three agree.

=== Series of elephant jokes ===
A series of elephant jokes can be constructed. Linking the appropriateness of each subsequent answer to the logically absurd structure of the preceding joke, the overall absurdity of a series can continuously compound. For example:

Q: How do you shoot a blue elephant?
A: With a blue elephant gun.
Q: How do you shoot a yellow elephant?
A: Have you ever seen a yellow elephant?
Q: How do you shoot a red elephant?
A: Hold his trunk shut until he turns blue, and then shoot him with the blue elephant gun.
Q: How do you shoot a purple elephant?
A: Paint him red, hold his trunk shut until he turns blue, and then shoot him with the blue elephant gun.

The absurdity of the first riddle's answer subverts the audience's initial expectations. The second and third riddles reinforce the expectation for this logically absurd structure. The final riddle concludes by again absurdly subverting the audience's expected framework. The humor for independent elephant jokes relies on absurd answers that ignore expectations, yet have a certain appropriateness. Here the absurdity is compounded when the appropriateness of the final riddle's answer is dependent upon undermining the logically absurd structure built from the preceding riddles.

One short example involves a displacement of a concept from one animal's features to those of an elephant, in terms of function:

Q: Why do ducks have flat feet?
A: To stamp out burning fires.
Q: Why do elephants have flat feet?
A: To stamp out burning ducks.

In another example:

Q: How many elephants will fit into a Mini?
A: Four: Two in the front, two in the back.
Q: How can you fit five elephants into a Mini?
A: Don't be silly; there isn't room for five elephants in a Mini.
Q: Well, can you fit five elephants into a Volkswagen Beetle?
A: Sure: Two in front, two in the back, one in the glove box, and pack the trunks in the boot (British English for "trunk").
Q: How many giraffes will fit into a Mini?
A: None. It's full of elephants.
Q: How do you get two whales in a Mini?
A: Along the M4 and across the Severn Bridge. (Note: This joke relies upon being spoken rather than being read, "two whales" being a homophone (or near homophone) of "to Wales". (See wine–whine merger.))
Q: How do you know there is an elephant in your refrigerator?
A: There are footprints in the butter.
Q: How do you know there are two elephants in your refrigerator?
A: You can hear giggling when you close the door.
Q: How do you know there are three elephants in your refrigerator?
A: You can't close the door.
Q: How do you know there are four elephants in your refrigerator?
A: There's an empty Mini parked outside.

Elephant jokes thus not only deliberately undermine the conventions of riddles, they even act to undermine themselves. This even extends to undermining the implied premise, expected by those that are familiar with elephant jokes, that an elephant joke is automatically illogical, or even involves elephants at all. For example:

Q: What do elephants have that nothing else has?
A: Baby elephants.
Q: What is gray, has four legs, and a trunk?
A: A mouse going on vacation.
Q: What is brown, has four legs, and a trunk?
A: A mouse coming back from vacation.
Q: What has eight legs, two trunks, four eyes, and two tails?
A: Two elephants.

There can even be an off-color tinge:

Q: Why is an elephant big, grey and wrinkly?
A: Because if it were small, white and smooth it would be an aspirin.
Q: Why are golf balls small and white?
A: Because if they were big and grey they would be elephants.

One time Gong Show act Mike Elephant is remembered for the following joke:

Q: What's the difference between an elephant and a plum?
A: Their color.
Q: What did Tarzan say to Jane when he saw the elephants coming?
A: "Here come the elephants."
Q: What did Jane say to Tarzan when she saw the elephants coming?
A: "Here come the plums." She was color-blind.

Some may be regional:

Q: How do you get a herd of Addo elephants out of your bedroom?
A: Sit outside and scream like an orange. (In the early days of the park, surplus oranges were used to tempt Addo elephants to viewing sites for tourists.)

Elephant jokes can also use their inherent absurdity to point up the inherent absurdity in some current events. One such joke from the early 1960s refers to an incident in President Kennedy's on-again-off-again support for Cuban exiles' attempts to overthrow Fidel Castro:

Q: How do you get 2,000 elephants to invade Cuba?
A: Promise them air support!

== Symbolism ==
Elephant jokes are seen by many commentators as symbolic of the culture of the United States and the United Kingdom in the 1960s. Elliott Oring notes that elephant jokes dismiss conventional questions and answers, repudiate established wisdom, and reject the authority of traditional knowledge. He draws a parallel between this and the counterculture of the 1960s, stating that "disestablishment was the purpose of both," pointing to the sexual revolution and noting that "[p]erhaps it was no accident that many of the elephant jokes emphasized the intrusion of sex into the most innocuous areas."

In their paper, On elephantasy and elephanticide, Abrahams and Dundes consider elephant jokes to be convenient disguises for racism, and symbolised the nervousness of white people about the civil rights movement. Whilst blatantly racialist jokes became less acceptable, elephant jokes were a useful proxy. One example Abrahams and Dundes provide is the joke:

Q: What is big and grey and comes in quarts?
A: An elephant.

They state that the "big and grey and comes in quarts" is in fact a reference "to the supposed mammoth nature of black sexuality." Similarly, the joke about an elephant in the bathtub is argued to be a reference to the increased intrusion of black people into "the most intimate areas of white life."

Oring strongly disagrees with this view, writing: "The Civil Rights movement, of course, was an integral part of the countercultural revolution. But there is no reason to view it as the single force conditioning the joke cycle. Much more than the relations between the races was being turned on its ear. Reducing elephant jokes to a mere front for racial aggression, it seems to me, not only misses the larger sense of what the jokes are about, but the larger sense of what was going on in the society at the time." and continuing: "Elephant joking is more than a description of the episodic career of an animal with a phallic nose. What engenders the humor in such jokes is the violation of categories of expectation, and not images of subjugation, degradation, or feminization of the elephant."

Charles Gruner agrees with Oring that Abrahams' and Dundes' explanation (that "the elephant is an ambivalent father figure" that is, in reality, "the black man (perceived as a sexual threat) that stands hidden behind the image of the elephant") is an "explanation from Freudian Monsterland [that] holds no water."

Gruner however disagrees with Oring about the chronological topicality of the elephant joke and its relation to social upheavals, arguing from personal experience of "one of the best motion picture sight gags in history", where Jimmy Durante in the 1962 movie Billy Rose's Jumbo is attempting to sneak an elephant unseen through a circus. Upon coming around a tent and being faced with a crowd of people and a policeman who demands "Where do you think you are you going with that elephant?" Durante, whose arms are spread wide to stop the elephant right behind him from advancing farther, asks innocently, "What elephant?" Gunder proposes that the success of this sight gag spawned in comic writers the idea of "hiding the elephant by all sorts of ridiculous means," and thus, by extension to "other silly, stupid comparisons," the whole genre of elephant jokes.

== See also ==
- Blind men and an elephant – Parable illustrating ontological reasoning
- Elephant in the room – English idiom
- Elephant test – Classification based on observable evidence
- Meta-joke – Humor that alludes to itself
- Newspaper riddle – Riddle joke
