= Self-taxation =

Giving away resources as mandated by rural councils in the Soviet Union

In the Soviet Union, self-taxation (Russian: Самообложение, samooblozhenie) was a form of collecting various resources (money, food, etc.) in rural areas for local needs. Described as voluntary, it was established at a common meeting of the residents of an administrative unit (settlement or selsoviet). The common annual rate was set over the unit, with the rate for independent farmers had to be at least 25% higher than for kolkhozniks, sovkhozniks, and factory and state workers. It was regulated by several joint decrees of the Central Executive Committee and Sovnarkom of the Soviet Union with the same title, "On the Self-Taxation of Rural Population" ("О самообложении сельского населения") dated by August 16, 1930, August 1, 1931 and September 11, 1937. and later by other central governmental organs, such as Presidium Supreme Soviet (1984)

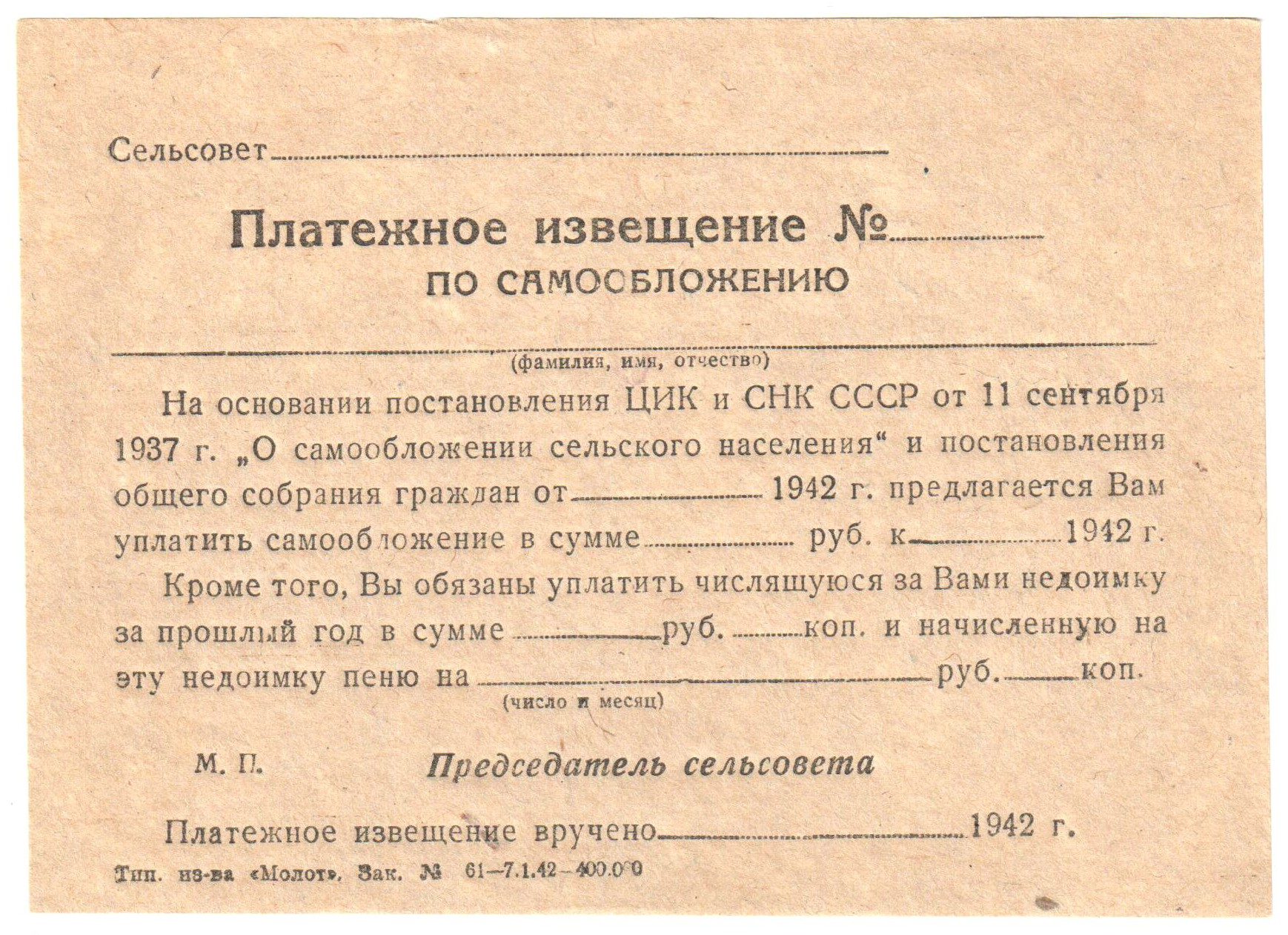
The Soviet 1942 blank form of the payment notice for self-taxation. Russian: Платёжное извещение по самообложению
