= Whisper joke =

Joke said secretly, usually to avoid oppression

In the history of German humour, whisper jokes (German: Flüsterwitze) were jokes that could not be told publicly in Nazi Germany due to fear of persecution, including the risk of execution. They often addressed taboo subjects such as criticizing or mocking the Nazi authorities.

== Nazi Germany ==
Whisper jokes spread in Nazi Germany under the dictatorship of Adolf Hitler, and served different purposes. Inside Germany, the jokes voiced criticism against the totalitarian regime, which would otherwise have been subject to persecution. They could thus be seen as a form of resistance. In the occupied areas, and especially in the Nazi ghettos, whisper jokes can be interpreted as a survival mechanism.

The following is an example of a whisper joke in Germany, parodied from the children's prayer: "Dear God, make me good / so I can go to heaven" (Lieber Gott, mach mich fromm / Daß ich in den Himmel komm), rephrased as "Dear God, make me dumb / so I don't come to Dachau" (Lieber Gott, mach mich stumm / Daß ich nicht nach Dachau kumm).

There have been quite a few whisper jokes about Hitler: Hitler is visiting an asylum. The patients lined up by their beds greet him with "Heil Hitler!". Only one man stands aside and does not greet him. Hitler gets angry and asks him why. He answers: "I'm not crazy, I'm the head of the ward." In 1944, a person was executed for telling this joke: Hitler and Hermann Göring are standing on the Berlin Radio Tower. Hitler tells Göring he wants to do something to cheer up the people of Berlin. "Why don't you just jump?" Göring suggests.

Joseph Goebbels' Sportpalast speech in 1943 led to the spread of a late-war whisper joke, popular in the western part of Germany, especially the Ruhr:

Lieber Tommy fliege weiter,
wir sind alle Bergarbeiter.
Fliege weiter nach Berlin,
da ham’ se alle Ja geschrien.

Translation:

Dear Tommy, keep on flying,
Here we're all busy mining.
On to Berlin you should fly,
That's where "yes" they always cry.

During the war, there were a number of jokes related to the war, such as:

- Someone from Essen and someone from Berlin talk about the damage done by allied bombing campaigns. Says the guy from Berlin: The last bombing run on the capital was so serious, the window panes kept falling out until five hours after the raid. The guy from Essen replies: That's nothing! After the last bombing run, pictures of the Führer kept flying out of the windows for fourteen days!
- German Christmas 1943: The English throw Christmas trees (German expression for target marker flares), the flak (anti-aircraft gun) contributes "Christmas tree balls" (in German: "Kugel" can be both, also a bullet), Göring donates tinsel (chaff), Goebbels tells Christmas stories ("Märchen" = fairy tales), and the German people light candles in the basement and await the gift giving ("Bescherung" = gift giving, but also "mess") descending from above.

Late in the war the following whisper jokes circulated:

- Time is flying. A thousand years are already over ... (mocking the term "thousand-year Reich")
- Which city has the most warehouses? Berlin: Wherever you look, there were houses ... (In the center of Berlin, more than 50% of the apartments had been destroyed or severely damaged by the end of the war.) - This is a pun with the two German words "Waren" (goods, wares) and "waren" (there/they were).
- Soldiers of the Volkssturm are now being sent to the front in pairs. One throws a stone, and the other one shouts "boom!".
