= Partorg =

A partorg (Russian: парторг, from партийный организатор, partiyny organizator, or "party organizer") was a person appointed by the Central Committee of the Communist Party of the Soviet Union to work at important places: larger plants, construction sites, kolkhozes, institutions, etc. The position was introduced in 1933. The duties of a partorg were political work and supervision of the execution of plans in production, procurement, etc. The partorg was usually recommended to be elected secretaries of the bureaus of local partkoms. Informally, the terms "partorg" and "partkom secretary" were used interchangeably.

Notice the difference of the position of partorg from that of party organizer of some other parties.
