= East German jokes =

Jokes from East Germany

- Type of joke: Historical joke
- Target of joke: East Germans
- Languages: German; English; Russian

East German jokes, jibes popular in the former German Democratic Republic (GDR, also known as East Germany), reflected the concerns of East German citizens and residents between 1949 and 1990. Jokes frequently targeted political figures, such as Socialist Party General Secretary Erich Honecker or State Security Minister Erich Mielke, who headed the Stasi secret police. Elements of daily life, such as economic scarcity, relations between the GDR and the Soviet Union, or Cold War rival, the United States, were also common. There were also ethnic jokes, highlighting differences of language or culture between Saxony and Central Germany.

== Political jokes as a tool of protest ==
Hans Jörg Schmidt sees the political joke in the GDR as a tool to voice discontent and protest. East German jokes thus mostly address political, economic, and social issues, criticise important politicians such as Walter Ulbricht or Erich Honecker, as well as political institutions or decisions. For this reason, Schmidt sees them as an indicator for popular opinion or as a "political barometer" that signals the opinion trends among the population. Political jokes continued the German tradition of the whisper joke.

== Legal consequences and Stasi surveillance ==
According to researcher Bodo Müller, no one was ever officially convicted due to a joke; rather, the jokes were dubbed propaganda that threatened the state or generally agitated against it. Jokes of this nature were seen as a violation of Paragraph 19, as "State-endangering propaganda and hate speech". The jokes were taken very seriously, with friends and neighbours being interrogated as part of any prosecution. As East German trials were mostly open to the public, the jokes in question were thus never actually read out loud. Of the 100 people in Müller's research, 64 were convicted for having told one or more jokes, with sentences typically varying between one and three years in prison; at the harshest, the sentences could be as long as 4 years.

Most of the sentences were handed down in the 1950s before the Berlin Wall was built. Though the Stasi continued to arrest joke-tellers, sentences against them declined sharply in the following decades; the last verdict of this nature was passed in 1972, against three engineers who had exchanged jokes during a breakfast break. Nevertheless, the Stasi continued to keep tabs on the telling of jokes: throughout the 1980s, monthly reports of popular sentiment delivered by the Stasi to SED district councils revealed a rising frequency of political jokes recounted in workplaces, unions, as well as party rallies, showcasing how the citizenry in the GDR's final years felt increasingly emboldened at every level to speak freely against the state.

== Operation DDR-Witz (GDR Joke) ==
During the Cold War, the GDR was a central focus of the West German Federal Intelligence Service (BND). In the mid-1970s, an employee at the agency's local headquarters in Pullach proposed that its agents and employees collect political jokes "over there" as part of their intelligence gathering; evaluating East German popular sentiment directly was seen as difficult, as people were hesitant to speak openly for fear of being overheard by the Stasi. According to former BND president Hans Georg-Wieck, "political humor in totalitarian systems sometimes reveals grievances (...) more drastically and directly than sophisticated analysis is capable of."

The BND would do just that; dubbing their efforts Operation DDR-Witz (GDR Joke), BND agents were instructed to collect and evaluate political jokes from the GDR. The jokes were collected through a variety of means: in the West, BND surveyors would collect jokes from recently arrived East German refugees, and West German citizens who received visitors from the GDR or visited their East German relatives were asked to supply jokes as well. The wiretapping of phone calls from the GDR were also used to collect jokes. Female BND agents in the East played the part of "train interrogators", collecting jokes on public transport from seemingly benign conversations with fellow passengers. The operation was highly effective and produced thousands of jokes over the course of 14 years, 657 of which were sent as part of regular reports to the Federal Chancellery. Additionally, the operation revealed just how widespread the jokes had become: through wiretaps, it was discovered that political jokes had ended up circulating among the ranks of the SED. The fall of the Berlin Wall did not disrupt the operation; the final report, containing over 30 jokes and several pages of protest slogans, was sent to the Chancellery on 11 November 1990, 39 days after Germany reunified. The BND's surveillance of East Germany, along with Operation DDR-Witz, was subsequently discontinued.

== Examples ==
=== Country and politics ===
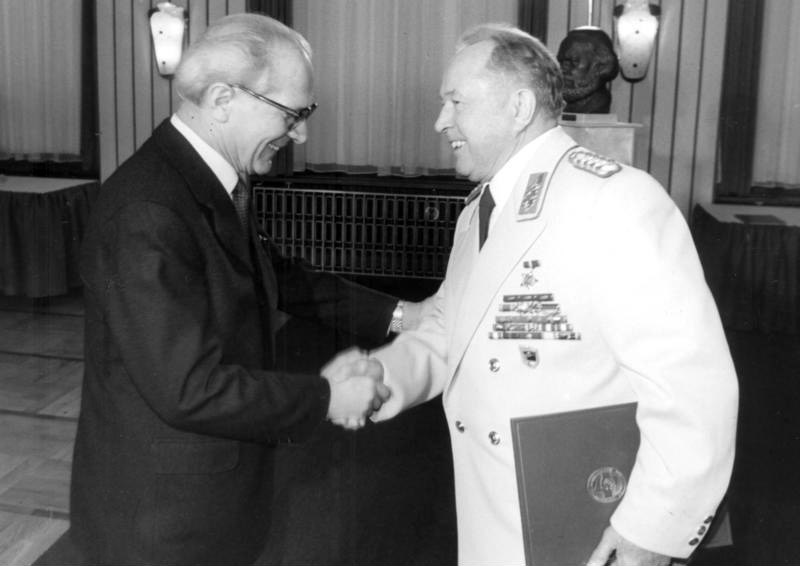
Erich Honecker presents an award to Stasi chief Erich Mielke (1980).

- Which three great nations in the world begin with "U"? — USA, USSR, and oUr GDR. (German: Was sind die drei großen Nationen der Welt, beginnend mit "U"? USA, UdSSR, und unsere DDR. This alludes to how official discourse often used the phrase "our GDR", and also often exaggerated the GDR's world status).
- The United States, the Soviet Union and the GDR want to raise the Titanic. The United States wants the jewels presumed to be in the safe, the Soviets are after the state-of-the-art technology, and the GDR – the GDR wants the band that played as it went down.
- Why are other socialist states called "brothers" instead of "friends"? – You can choose your friends but not your brothers.
- Why is toilet paper so rough in the GDR? In order to make every last asshole red.
- Results for international tonsillectomy competition: USA three minutes, France two minutes, GDR five hours. Explanation: in the GDR one can't open one's mouth, so the doctor had to go in the other way.
- Eberhard Cohrs had a famous joke "Do you know the difference between capitalism and socialism? Capitalism makes social mistakes, and socialism makes capital mistakes" (the audience usually figured out the punchline themselves).

=== Stasi ===
- How can you tell that the Stasi has bugged your apartment? – There's a new cabinet in it and a trailer with a generator in the street. (This is an allusion to the primitive state of East German microelectronics.)
- Honecker and Mielke are discussing their hobbies. Honecker: "I collect (German sammeln) all the jokes about me." Mielke: "Well we have almost the same hobby. I collect (German einsammeln, used figuratively like to garner) all those who tell jokes about you." (Compare with a similar Russian political joke.)
- Why do Stasi officers make such good taxi drivers? – You get in the car and they already know your name and where you live.

=== Honecker ===
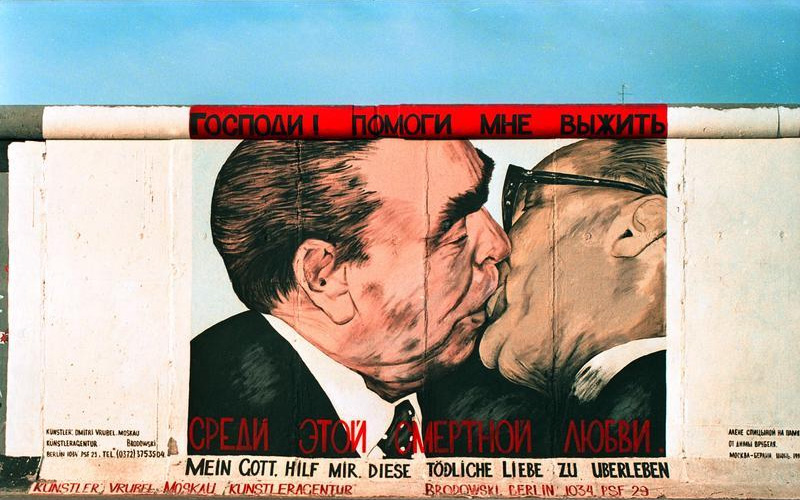
Soviet leader Leonid Brezhnev locked in a socialist fraternal kiss with Honecker

- Early in the morning, Honecker arrives at his office and opens his window. He greets the Sun, saying: "Good morning, dear Sun!" – "Good morning, dear Erich!" Honecker works, and then at noon he heads to the window and says: "Good day, dear Sun!" – "Good day, dear Erich!" In the evening, Erich calls it a day, and heads once more to the window, and says: "Good evening, dear Sun!" Hearing nothing, Honecker says again: "Good evening, dear Sun! What's the matter?" The sun retorts: "Kiss my arse. I'm in the West now!" (from the 2006 Oscar-winning movie The Lives of Others) A similar Soviet joke exists about Leonid Brezhnev.
- What do you do when you get Honecker on the phone? Hang up and try again. (This is a pun with the German words aufhängen und neuwählen, meaning both "hang up the phone and dial again" and "hang him and vote again".)
- Leonid Brezhnev is asked what his opinion of Honecker is: "Well, politically – I don't have much esteem for him. But – he definitely knows how to kiss!"
- A man got a care package and got arrested by a Stasi officer. They asked: "who gave you the package?" "My father!" "Where does your father live?" "Berlin" "East or West?" "East" "Who is his boss?" Honecker walks in and arrests the Stasi officer for interrogating him and Brezhnev's child.

=== Economy ===
- When an East German retiree returns from his first trip to West Germany, his children ask him what it was like. He replies: 'Well, it's basically the same as here: you can get anything for West German marks.'
- What are the four main enemies of East German agriculture? Spring, summer, autumn and winter.
- How can you use a banana as a compass? – Place a banana on the Berlin Wall. The end that gets bitten points East.

=== Trabant ===
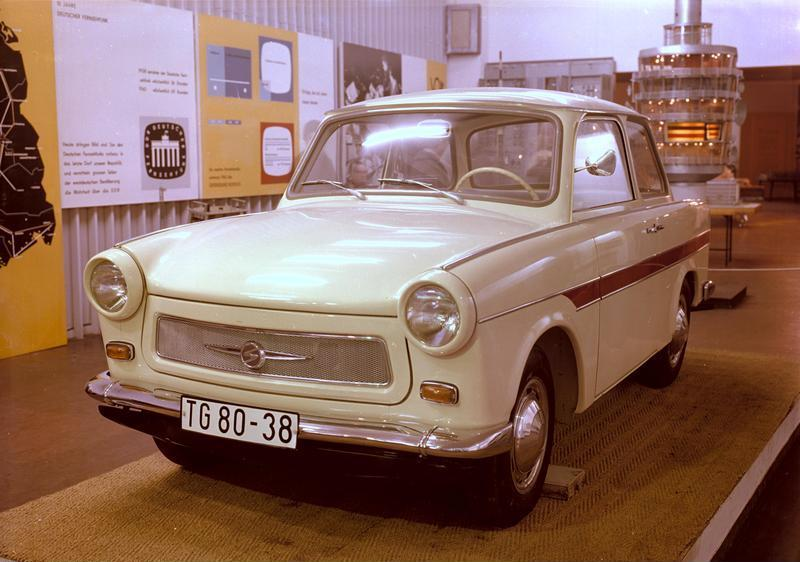
Showcased Trabant 601 (1963)

- What's the best feature of a Trabant? – There's a heater at the back to keep your hands warm when you're pushing it.
- A man driving a Trabant suddenly breaks his windshield wiper. Pulling into a service station, he hails a mechanic. 'Wipers for a Trabi?' he asks. The mechanic thinks about it for a few seconds and replies, 'Yes, sounds like a fair trade.' (Allusion to the shortage of spare parts for cars.)
- A new Trabi has been launched with two exhaust pipes – so you can use it as a wheelbarrow.
- How do you double the value of a Trabant? – Fill it with gas.
- German engineers from the Trabant factory toured an auto assembly line in Japan. At the end of the line they witnessed a Japanese worker put a live cat inside the car and shut the doors. Puzzled, the German engineers asked their tour guide why. The guide replied, "When we come back the next morning, if the cat is dead we know the car was built airtight and thus has passed inspection." The German engineers nod and take notes. When they get back to Germany they put a cat in a Trabant and roll up the windows. When they get back the next morning the cat is gone.
- The back page of the Trabant manual contains the local bus schedule.
- Four men were seen carrying a Trabant. Somebody asks them why? Was it broken? They reply: "No, nothing wrong with it, we’re just in a hurry."
- How do you catch a Trabi? – Place a piece of chewing gum on the road. (Allusion to weak engine.)

=== Saxons ===
- The doorbell rings. The woman of the house goes to the door and quickly returns, looking rather startled: "Dieter! There's a man outside who just asks, Tatü tata?" (Tatü tata is onomatopoeia for the sound of a police car siren). Dieter goes to the door and comes back laughing. "It's my colleague from Saxony, asking s do Dieto da?" (standard German Ist der Dieter da?, i.e. "Is Dieter there?", in Upper Saxon dialect)
- A Saxon sits at a table in a cafe. Another man takes a seat and kicks him in the shin. He glances up briefly but says nothing. The man kicks him again. Now the Saxon says: 'If you do this for a third time, I will switch to another table.' (Allusion to the Saxon's mentality.)

== See also ==
- DDR German
- German humour
- Russian political jokes
- Whisper joke
