= Party Organizer (journal) =

Defunct internal journal of the Communist Party USA (1927–1938)

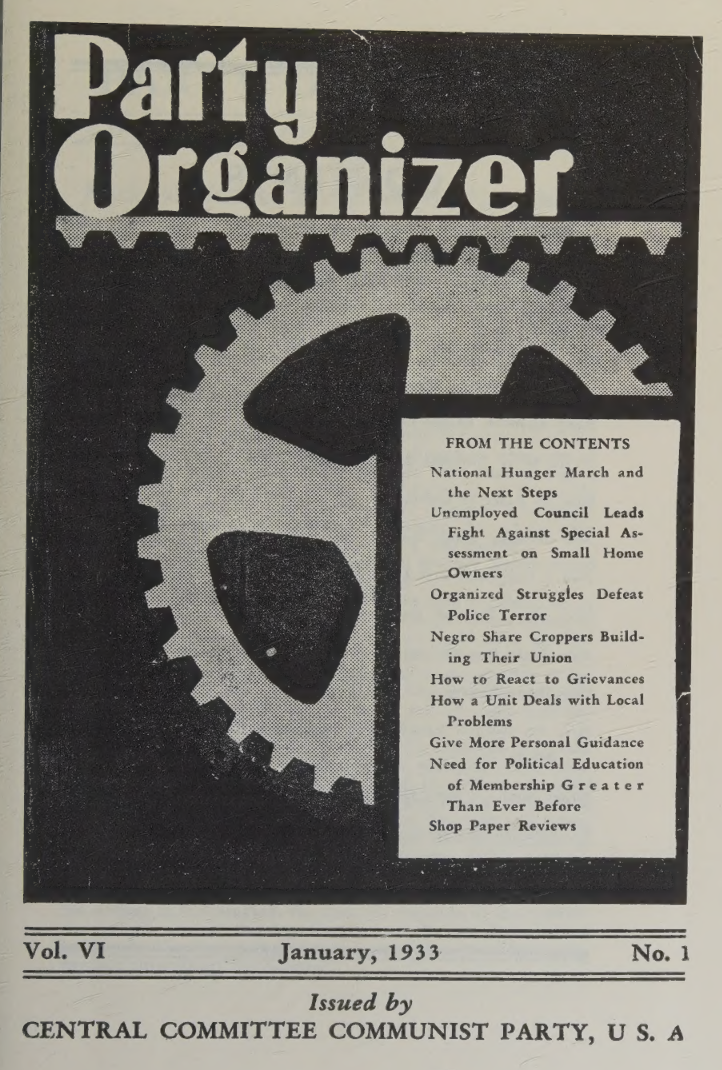
- Type: Monthly newspaper
- Format: Broadsheet and tabloid
- Founder: Communist Party USA
- Founded: 1927; 99 years ago
- Ceased publication: 1938
- Political alignment: Communist; socialist
- Language: English
- Circulation: Various

The Party Organizer was the internal organizing party journal of the Communist Party USA, from 1927 to 1938. It was used as a means of party organization, messaging, and to coordinate and guide party activists. The journal was specifically not intended for mass circulation to non-members.
