= Washington Obkom =

Pejorative political term

The Washington Obkom (Russian: вашингтонский обком), literally the "Washington Oblast Party Committee", is a pejorative term used in Russian media and speech to imply that many crucial decisions by political elites of Russia and some other post-Soviet states have been and are agreed with and/or taken in the United States. The term incorporates two incompatible symbols of power: "Washington D.C." as the symbol of the US administration, and "obkom" symbolizing the power of the Communist Party. According to Russian political analyst Oleg Maslov Washington Obkom is one of the key hybrid political symbols in the 21st century Russia. The term is mostly used by various types of Russian nationalists but occasionally is used by the figures of democratic opposition, e.g. by Garry Kasparov. The political term became popular after the 1998 Russian financial crisis that triggered a wave of Anti-Americanism in the post-Soviet Russia and had its peak of Internet usage in January 2006 after the Russia–Ukraine gas dispute of 2005–2006.

== See also ==
- Russia–United States relations
- New World Order (conspiracy theory)
