= Organization of the Communist Party of the Soviet Union =

How the ruling Marxist-Leninist party was structured across the Eurasian power

The organization of the Communist Party of the Soviet Union was based on the principles of democratic centralism.

The governing body of the Communist Party of the Soviet Union (CPSU) was the Party Congress, which initially met annually but whose meetings became less frequent, particularly under Joseph Stalin (dominant from the late 1920s to 1953). Party Congresses would elect a Central Committee which, in turn, would elect a Politburo and a Secretariat. Under Stalin, the most powerful position in the party became the General Secretary, who was elected by the Politburo and Secretariat. In 1952 the Politburo became the Presidium.

In theory, supreme power in the party was invested in the Party Congress. However, in practice the power structure became reversed and, particularly after the death of Lenin in January 1924, supreme power became the domain of the General Secretary.

== Higher levels ==
In the late Soviet Union the CPSU incorporated the communist parties of the 15 constituent republics (the communist branch of the Russian SFSR was established in 1990). Before 1990 the communist party organization in Russian oblasts, autonomous republics and some other major administrative units were subordinated directly to the CPSU Central Committee.

== Lower levels ==
At lower levels, the organizational hierarchy was managed by Party Committees, or partkoms (партком). A partkom was headed by the elected "partkom bureau secretary" ("partkom secretary", секретарь парткома). At enterprises, institutions, kolkhozes, etc., they were called as such, i.e., "partkoms". At higher levels the Committees were abbreviated accordingly: obkoms (обком) at oblast (zone) levels (known earlier as gubkoms (губком) for guberniyas), raikoms (райком) at raion (district) levels (known earlier as ukoms (уком) for uyezds), gorkom (горком) at city levels, etc.

The same terminology ("raikom", etc.) was used in the organizational structure of Komsomol.

The bottom level of the Party was the primary party organization (первичная партийная организация) or party cell (партийная ячейка). It was created within any organizational entity of any kind where there were at least three communists. The management of a cell was called party bureau/partbureau (партийное бюро, партбюро). A partbureau was headed by the elected bureau secretary (секретарь партбюро).

At smaller party cells, secretaries were regular employees of the corresponding plant/hospital/school/etc. Sufficiently large party organizations were usually headed by an exempt secretary, who drew his salary from the Party money.

== Main offices ==
- General Secretary of the Communist Party of the Soviet Union – became synonymous with leader of the Party under Joseph Stalin (General Secretary from 1922 to 1952)
- Secretariat of the CPSU Central Committee – leading body within the Central Committee. Headed by the General Secretary or by the First Secretary.
- Politburo of the CPSU Central Committee – The political bureau of the Central Committee; in practice, the ruling body of both the Communist Party and the Soviet Union
- Central Committee of the Communist Party – the governing body of the Party between each Congress. Conducted the day-to-day business of the Party and the government.
- Congress of the CPSU – the gathering of Party delegates every five years. It was the oversight body of the entire Party.
- Organizational Bureau of the Party Central Committee, or Orgburo – fulfilled Party human-resources management
- CPSU Party Control Commission
- CPSU Central Auditing Commission (often translated as the calque Central Revision Commission, from "Центральная ревизионная комиссия")
- Party Conference – the oversight body of the Party in between Party Congresses. Usually gathered once a year.

== Republican branches ==
- Communist Party of the Russian Soviet Federative Socialist Republic (1990–1991), in the Russian Soviet Federative Socialist Republic;
- Communist Party of Byelorussia (1917–1991), in the Byelorussian Soviet Socialist Republic;
- Communist Party of Ukraine (1918–1991), in the Ukrainian Soviet Socialist Republic;
- Communist Party of Estonia (1920–1991), in the Estonian Soviet Socialist Republic;
- Communist Party of Latvia (1904–1991) in the Latvian Soviet Socialist Republic;
- Communist Party of Lithuania (1918–1991) in the Lithuanian Soviet Socialist Republic;
- Communist Party of Kazakhstan (1936–1991) in the Kazakh Soviet Socialist Republic;
- Communist Party of Uzbekistan (1925–1991) in the Uzbek Soviet Socialist Republic;
- Communist Party of Turkmenistan (1924–1991) in the Turkmen Soviet Socialist Republic;
- Communist Party of Kirghizia (1924–1991) in the Kirghiz Soviet Socialist Republic;
- Communist Party of Tajikistan (1924–1991) in the Tajik Soviet Socialist Republic;
- Communist Party of Georgia (1921–1991) in the Georgian Soviet Socialist Republic;
- Communist Party of Armenia (1920–1991) in the Armenian Soviet Socialist Republic;
- Communist Party of Azerbaijan (1920–1991) in the Azerbaijan Soviet Socialist Republic;
- Communist Party of Moldavia (Moldova) (1940–1991) in the Moldavian Soviet Socialist Republic.

== See also ==
- Organization of the Chinese Communist Party
- Partorg
- Washington Obkom
