= Ben Lewis (filmmaker) =

British documentary filmmaker and art critic

Ben Lewis (born 1966) is a British art critic, historian and documentary filmmaker.

== Books ==
- 2019: The Last Leonardo: Secret Lives of the World's Most Expensive Painting, a history and investigation of the Salvator Mundi painting attributed to Leonardo da Vinci
- 2008: Hammer & Tickle. The Communist Joke Book, Weidenfeld & Nicolson
  - Also published in Germany, Portugal, Poland, Slovenia and Italy

== Documentaries ==
- 2017: The Beatles, Hippies and Hells Angels: Inside the Crazy World of Apple (unauthorized film; narrated by Peter Coyote)
- 2013: Google and the World Brain
- 2009:The Great Contemporary Art Bubble, "explores the current international art market, from its heady peak to its inevitable crash", best feature documentary at the Foyle Film Festival
- 2006: Hammer & Tickle: The Communist Joke Book, a documentary about Russian political jokes, best documentary at the Zurich Film Festival
- 2005: Blowing Up Paradise, about French nuclear testing in the Pacific, Special Jury Prix at the FIFO (2008)
- Since 2003: Art Safari series;
  - Art Safari-1: films on Maurizio Cattelan, Gregor Schneider, Matthew Barney, and relational art (theories of the French curator and art citic Nicolas Bourriaud)
  - Art Safari-2: Wim Delvoye, Sophie Calle, Takashi Murakami, and Santiago Sierra
  - Bronze prize at the New York Television Festival (2007), North Rhine-Westphalia Special Prize for Culture ( NRW Sonderpreis Kultur) at the Adolf-Grimme-Preis (2007)
- 2001: The King of Communism: the pomp and pageantry Nicolae Ceausescu, Best Historical Documentary award from Grierson Awards (2002)
- 1999: The Lost Race; history of the National Front and its splinter groups
