= Mad Gab =

Board game

- Manufacturers: Mattel
- Publication: 1996
- Genres: Board game
- Languages: English
- Players: 2–12, two teams
- Playing time: 45 minutes
- Chance: Medium
- Skills: Linguistics
- Materials required: game board; flipper unit; score pad; cards; timer
- Website: https://service.mattel.com/us/productDetail.aspx?prodno=G6850&siteid=27

Mad Gab is a card game involving words. At least two teams of 2–12 players have two minutes to sound out three puzzles. The puzzles are known as mondegreens and contain small words that, when put together, make a word or phrase. For example, "These If Hill Wore" when pronounced quickly sounds like "The Civil War". There are two levels, easy and hard. The faster the puzzles are answered, the more points the players score.

This game uses phonetics, which is a branch of linguistics. This game is a test for the human brain to process sounds based on simpler English-written sounds into a meaningful word or phrase. The game is designed where a person would not be able to decode the meaning of the phrase unless spoken out loud and listened; reading the phrase silently will not allow the player to decode the meaning because sounds would have to be encoded into meaningful English words (unless, of course, the player has an inner voice).

Playing time for the game is approximately 45 minutes.

== Game versions ==
Bible Mad Gab, released in 2000, references the NIV, e.g. "know Ozark".

Astraware developed a version of Mad Gab for the PalmPilot. It could be played solo or with two people passing the device back and forth.

== See also ==
- Ambiguity
- Amphibology
- Double entendre
- Eggcorn
- Folk etymology
- Holorime
- Ladle Rat Rotten Hut
- Mairzy Doats
- Malapropism
- Mondegreen
- Phono-semantic matching
- Same-sounding phrases
- Soramimi
