= N'Heures Souris Rames =

Book of translated nursery rhymes

N'heures souris rames : the Coucy Castle manuscript
- Author: Ormonde de Kay
- Subject: homophonic translation, English to French
- Genre: Humor
- Publisher: C. N. Potter
- Publication place: United States
- English publication date: 1980
- Media type: book
- ISBN: 0-517-54081-9
- OCLC: 6378996

N'Heures Souris Rames (Nursery Rhymes) is a book of homophonic translations from English to French, published in 1980 by Ormonde de Kay. It contains some forty nursery rhymes, among which are Coucou doux de Ledoux (Cock-A-Doodle-Doo), Signe, garçon. Neuf Sikhs se pansent (Sing a Song of Sixpence) and Hâte, carrosse bonzes (Hot Cross Buns).

Below is de Kay's Georgie Porgie in the original English with the translation into French:

Georgie Porgie, Pudding and Pie, Kissed the girls and made them cry. When the boys came out to play; Georgie Porgie ran away.	Georgie Port-régie, peu digne en paille, Qui se dégeule sans mais. Dame craille. Où haine de bouées ce qu'aime a tout plié: Georgie Port-régie règne. Ohé.

Each poem is accompanied by a series of footnotes, ostensibly explaining obscure terms and references in the French, which parody the scholarly footnotes of philological texts.

== See also ==
- Anguish Languish (1956)
- Mots d'Heures: Gousses, Rames: The d'Antin Manuscript (1967)
- Homophonic translation
- Mondegreen
- Phono-semantic matching
