= Mondegreen =

Misinterpretation of a spoken phrase

A mondegreen (/ˈmɒndɪˌɡriːn/) is a mishearing or misinterpretation of a phrase in a way that gives it a new meaning. Mondegreens are most often created by a person listening to a poem or a song; the listener, being unable to hear a lyric clearly, substitutes words that sound similar and make some kind of sense. The American writer Sylvia Wright coined the term in 1954, recalling a childhood memory of her mother reading the Scottish ballad "The Bonnie Earl o' Moray", and mishearing the words "laid him on the green" as "Lady Mondegreen".

"Mondegreen" was included in the 2000 edition of the Random House Webster's College Dictionary, and in the Oxford English Dictionary in 2002. Merriam-Webster's Collegiate Dictionary added the word in 2008.

== Etymology ==
In a 1954 essay in Harper's Magazine, Sylvia Wright described how, as a young girl, she misheard the last line of the first stanza from the ballad "The Bonnie Earl o' Moray" (from Thomas Percy's 1765 book Reliques of Ancient English Poetry). She wrote:

When I was a child, my mother used to read aloud to me from Percy's Reliques, and one of my favorite poems began, as I remember:

Ye Highlands and ye Lowlands,
Oh, where hae ye been?
They hae slain the Earl Amurray,
And Lady Mondegreen.

The correct lines are, "They hae slain the Earl o' Moray / And laid him on the green." Wright explained the need for a new term:

The point about what I shall hereafter call mondegreens, since no one else has thought up a word for them, is that they are better than the original.

== Psychology ==
People are more likely to notice what they expect rather than things that are not part of their everyday experiences; this is known as confirmation bias. A person may mistake an unfamiliar stimulus for a familiar and more plausible version. For example, to consider a well-known mondegreen in the song "Purple Haze", one may be more likely to hear Jimi Hendrix singing that he is about to kiss this guy than that he is about to kiss the sky. Similarly, if a lyric uses words or phrases that the listener is unfamiliar with, or in an uncommon sentence structure, they may be misheard as using more familiar terms.

The creation of mondegreens may be driven in part by cognitive dissonance; the listener finds it psychologically uncomfortable to listen to a song and not make out the words. Steven Connor suggests that mondegreens are the result of the brain's constant attempts to make sense of the world by making assumptions to fill in the gaps when it cannot clearly determine what it is hearing. Connor sees mondegreens as the "wrenchings of nonsense into sense". (Note: "But, though mishearings may appear pleasingly or even subversively to sabotage sense, they are in fact in essence negentropic, which is to say, they push up the slope from random noise to the redundancy of voice, moving therefore from the direction of nonsense to sense, of nondirection to direction. They seem to represent the intolerance of pure phenomena. In this they are different from the misspeakings with which they are often associated. Seeing slips of the ear as simply the auditory complement of slips of the tongue mistakes their programmatic nature and function. Misspeakings are the disorderings of sense by nonsense; mishearings are the wrenchings of nonsense into sense." Steven Connor (14 February 2009). "Earslips: Of Mishearings and Mondegreens". Archived from the original on 12 January 2012.) This dissonance will be most acute when the lyrics are in a language in which the listener is fluent.

Steven Pinker has observed that mondegreen mishearings tend to be less plausible than the original lyrics, and that once a listener has "locked in" to a particular misheard interpretation of a song's lyrics, it can remain unquestioned, even when that plausibility becomes strained. Pinker gives the example of a student "stubbornly" mishearing the chorus to "Venus" ("I'm your Venus") as "I'm your penis" and being surprised that the song was allowed on the radio. The phenomenon may, in some cases, be triggered by people hearing "what they want to hear", as in the case of the song "Louie Louie": parents heard obscenities in the Kingsmen recording where none existed.

James Gleick states that the mondegreen is a distinctly modern phenomenon. Without the improved communication and language standardization brought about by radio, he argues that there would have been no way to recognize and discuss this shared experience. Just as mondegreens transform songs based on experience, a folk song learned by repetition often is transformed over time when sung by people in a region where some of the song's references have become obscure. A classic example is "The Golden Vanity", which contains the line "As she sailed upon the lowland sea". British immigrants carried the song to Appalachia, where later generations of singers, not knowing what the term lowland sea refers to, transformed it over generations from "lowland" to "lonesome". (Note: Jean Ritchie recorded the ballad on her 1961 Folkways album, British Traditional Ballads in the Southern Mountains Volume 1. Jean's version, which she learned from her mother, corresponds with Story Type A found in Tristram Potter Coffin's The British Traditional Ballad in North America. The refrain "As she sailed upon the low, and lonesome low, She sailed upon the lonesome sea" seems to be typical of variants of the ballads recorded and collected in the Ozarks and Appalachian mountains and references The Merry Golden Tree, Weeping Willow Tree, or Green Willow Tree as the ship."The Golden Vanity / The Old Virginia Lowlands". Mainly Norfolk: English Folk and Other Good Music. Archived from the original on 18 April 2019.)

== Examples ==
=== In songs ===
The national anthem of the United States is highly susceptible to the creation of mondegreens, two in the first line. Francis Scott Key's "The Star-Spangled Banner" begins with the line "O say can you see, by the dawn's early light". This has been misinterpreted (both accidentally and deliberately) as "José, can you see", an example of the Hobson-Jobson effect. The second half of the line has also been misheard as "by the donzerly light" or other variants. This has led to people believing that "donzerly" is an actual word.

Religious songs, learned by ear (and often by children), are another common source of mondegreens. The most-cited example is "Gladly, the cross-eyed bear" (from the line in the hymn "Keep Thou My Way" by Fanny Crosby and Theodore E. Perkins: "Kept by Thy tender care, gladly the cross I'll bear"). Jon Carroll and many others quote it as "Gladly the cross I'd bear"; the confusion may be heightened by the unusual object-subject-verb word order of the phrase. The song "I Was on a Boat That Day" by Old Dominion features a reference to this mondegreen.

Mondegreens expanded as a phenomenon with the advent of radio, and especially with the growth of rock and roll and hip-hop. Among the most-reported examples are:

1. "'Scuse me while I kiss this guy" (from a lyric in the song "Purple Haze" by The Jimi Hendrix Experience: "'Scuse me while I kiss the sky").
2. "The girl with colitis goes by" (from a lyric in the song "Lucy in the Sky with Diamonds" by The Beatles: "The girl with kaleidoscope eyes")
3. "There's a bathroom on the right" (from a lyric in the song "Bad Moon Rising" by Creedence Clearwater Revival: "There's a bad moon on the rise").
4. "All the lonely Starbucks lovers" (from a lyric in the song "Blank Space" by Taylor Swift: "Got a long list of ex-lovers")

Both Jimi Hendrix and Creedence Clearwater Revival's John Fogerty eventually acknowledged the mishearings of their lyrics by deliberately singing the mondegreen versions of their songs in concert.

The cover of Bruce Springsteen's song "Blinded by the Light" by Manfred Mann's Earth Band contains what has been called "probably the most misheard lyric of all time". The phrase "revved up like a deuce", altered from Springsteen's original "cut loose like a deuce", both lyrics referring to the hot rodders slang deuce (short for deuce coupe) for a 1932 Ford coupe, is frequently misheard as "wrapped up like a douche". Springsteen himself has joked about the phenomenon, claiming that it was not until Manfred Mann rewrote the song to be about a "feminine hygiene product" that the song became popular. (Note: See this video of the mondegreen phenomenon in popular music."Top 10 Misheard Lyrics". 20 February 2013. Archived from the original on 11 December 2021 – via YouTube.)

Another commonly cited example of a song susceptible to mondegreens is Nirvana's 1991 song "Smells Like Teen Spirit". For instance, the line "Here we are now, entertain us" has variously been misinterpreted as "Here we are now, in containers" and "Here we are now, hot potatoes", among other renditions. American comedy musician "Weird Al" Yankovic wrote a 1992 parody of "Smells Like Teen Spirit" called "Smells Like Nirvana", whose lyrics poke fun at the difficult-to-understand lyrics to the original song. The opening verse begins "What is this song/All about?/Can't figure any lyrics out", and at one point Yankovic purposely garbles the lyrics: "It's hard to bargle nawdle zouss [sic]/With all these marbles in my mouth". "Smells Like Teen Spirit"'s writer Kurt Cobain called Yankovic "America's modern pop-rock genious [sic]" in personal journals published after his 1994 suicide. American rock band Electric Six revealed that their song Gay Bar was based on a humorous mishearing of the lyrics for the song "Girl U Want' by Devo, in which the lyrics: "She's just the girl, she's just the girl, the girl you want" were mishead as "she's just a girl, it's just a girl at a gay bar".

Rap and hip-hop lyrics may be particularly susceptible to being misheard because they do not necessarily follow standard pronunciations. The delivery of rap lyrics often relies heavily upon regional pronunciations or non-traditional accenting of words and phonemes to adhere to the artist's stylizations and the lyrics' written structure. This often occurs in the context of African-American Vernacular English (AAVE), as rap as a genre and musical form is associated with the African-American community. This can create confusion in audiences not familiar with AAVE. The issue is exemplified by controversies over alleged transcription errors in Yale University Press' 2010 Anthology of Rap.

=== Standardized and recorded mondegreens ===
Sometimes, the modified version of a lyric becomes standard, as is the case with "The Twelve Days of Christmas". The original has "four colly birds" (colly means 'black'; compare A Midsummer Night's Dream: "Brief as the lightning in the collied night"); by the turn of the twentieth century, these had been replaced by calling birds, which is the lyric used in the now-standard 1909 Frederic Austin version. Another example is found in ELO's song "Don't Bring Me Down". The original recorded lyric was "don't bring me down, Gruss!", but fans misheard it as "don't bring me down, Bruce!". Eventually, ELO began playing the song with the mondegreen lyric.

The song "Sea Lion Woman", recorded in 1939 by Christine and Katherine Shipp, was performed by Nina Simone under the title "See Line Woman". According to the liner notes from the compilation A Treasury of Library of Congress Field Recordings, the correct title of this playground song might also be "See [the] Lyin' Woman" or "C-Line Woman". Jack Lawrence's misinterpretation of the French phrase "pauvre Jean" ("poor John") as the identically pronounced "pauvres gens" ("poor people") led to the translation of La Goualante du pauvre Jean ("The Ballad of Poor John") as "The Poor People of Paris", a hit song in 1956.

=== In literature ===
A Monk Swimming by author Malachy McCourt is so titled because of a childhood mishearing of a phrase from the Catholic rosary prayer, Hail Mary. "Amongst women" became "a monk swimmin'".

The title and plot of the short science fiction story "Come You Nigh: Kay Shuns" ("Com-mu-ni-ca-tions") by Lawrence A. Perkins, in Analog Science Fiction and Fact magazine (April 1970), deals with securing interplanetary radio communications by encoding them with mondegreens.

Olive, the Other Reindeer is a 1997 children's book by Vivian Walsh, which borrows its title from a mondegreen of the line "all of the other reindeer" in the song "Rudolph the Red-Nosed Reindeer". The book was adapted into an animated Christmas special in 1999.

The travel guidebook series Lonely Planet is named after the misheard phrase "lovely planet" sung by Joe Cocker in Matthew Moore's song "Space Captain".

=== In film ===
A monologue of mondegreens appears in the 1971 film Carnal Knowledge. The camera focuses on actress Candice Bergen laughing as she recounts various phrases that fooled her as a child, including "Round John Virgin" (instead of "'Round yon virgin...") and "Gladly, the cross-eyed bear" (instead of "Gladly the cross I'd bear"). The title of the 2013 film Ain't Them Bodies Saints is a misheard lyric from a folk song; director David Lowery decided to use it because it evoked the "classical, regional" feel of 1970s rural Texas.

In the 1994 film The Santa Clause, a child identifies a ladder that Santa uses to get to the roof from its label: The Rose Suchak Ladder Company. He states that this is "just like the poem", misinterpreting "out on the lawn there arose such a clatter" from A Visit from St. Nicholas as "Out on the lawn, there's a Rose Suchak ladder".

=== In television ===
Mondegreens have been used in many television programmes and advertising campaigns, including:

- Four Candles, a 1976 sketch from the BBC comedy show The Two Ronnies, written by Ronnie Barker, in which comic effect is almost entirely generated through mondegreens.
- A 1987 series of advertisements for Kellogg's Nut 'n Honey Crunch featured a joke in which one person asks "What's for breakfast?" and is told "Nut 'N' Honey", which is misheard as "Nothing, honey".
- A series of advertisements for Maxell audio cassette tapes, produced by Howell Henry Chaldecott Lury, shown in 1989 and 1990, featured misheard versions of "Israelites" (e.g., "Me ears are alight") by Desmond Dekker and "Into the Valley" by the Skids as heard by users of other brands of tape.
- A 2002 advertisement for T-Mobile shows spokeswoman Catherine Zeta-Jones helping to correct a man who has misunderstood the chorus of Def Leppard's "Pour Some Sugar On Me" as "pour some shook up ramen".
- A 2006 advertisement for Cingular Wireless featured two friends uploading The Clash's "Rock the Casbah" to their phone while singing the lyrics entirely in mondegreens, concluding in them debating whether the titular lyric is "Lock the cashbox" or "Stop the cat box".
- An advertisement for the 2012 Volkswagen Passat touting the car's audio system shows a number of people singing incorrect versions of the line "Burning out his fuse up here alone" from the Elton John/Bernie Taupin song "Rocket Man", until a woman listening to the song in a Passat realizes the correct words.

=== In video games ===
The video game Super Mario 64 involved a mishearing during Mario's encounters with Bowser. Charles Martinet, the voice actor for Mario, explained the line was "So long, King-a Bowser"; however, it was misheard as "So long, gay Bowser". The misinterpreted line became a meme, in part popularized by the line's removal in some updated rereleases of the game.

Other games in the Mario series, like Mario Party and Mario Kart 64, also involve a mondegreen. Whenever the character Wario loses a minigame or a race, respectively, he says something along the lines of, "D'oh! I missed!" However, since he was originally designed to be German and his original voice actor, Thomas Spindler, was German, many people have heard this voice line as the German phrase "So ein Mist!", which means "oh, crap" in English. Spindler has said that this was the line he recorded in an interview in 2016. Charles Martinet, who is Wario's voice actor, has said that the voice line he recorded for the game was indeed "D'oh! I missed!" in 2020.

In the video game Final Fantasy XIV, the lyrics for the boss theme "Ultima" are "Beat, the heart of Sabik" but the English-speaking audience heard the voice lines as "big fat tacos" instead. This resulted in fan video remixes with the misunderstood lyrics. Developer Square Enix acknowledged the misunderstanding and embraced the joke, and made tacos a major plot point in the expansion Dawntrail.

=== Other notable examples ===
The traditional game "Telephone" or "Gossip" (in North America; it has a number of other names in other countries) involves mishearing a whispered sentence to produce successive mondegreens that gradually distort the original sentence as it is repeated by successive listeners. Among schoolchildren in the US, daily rote recitation of the Pledge of Allegiance has long provided opportunities for the genesis of mondegreens.

Speech-to-text functionality in modern smartphone messaging apps and search or assist functions may be hampered by faulty speech recognition. It has been noted that in text messaging, users often leave uncorrected mondegreens as a joke or puzzle for the recipient to solve. This wealth of mondegreens has proven to be a fertile ground for study by speech scientists and psychologists.

=== Notable collections ===
The classicist and linguist Steve Reece has collected examples of English mondegreens in song lyrics, religious creeds and liturgies, commercials and advertisements, and jokes and riddles. He has used this collection to shed light on the process of "junctural metanalysis" during the oral transmission of the ancient Greek epics, the Iliad and Odyssey.

== Reverse mondegreen ==
A reverse mondegreen is the intentional production, in speech or writing, of words or phrases that seem to be gibberish but disguise meaning. A prominent example is Mairzy Doats, a 1943 novelty song by Milton Drake, Al Hoffman, and Jerry Livingston. The lyrics are a reverse mondegreen, made up of same-sounding words or phrases (sometimes also referred to as "oronyms"), so pronounced (and written) as to challenge the listener (or reader) to interpret them:

Mairzy doats and dozy doats and liddle lamzy divey
A kiddley divey too, wouldn't you?

The clue to the meaning is contained in the bridge of the song:

If the words sound queer and funny to your ear, a little bit jumbled and jivey,
Sing "Mares eat oats and does eat oats and little lambs eat ivy."

That makes it clear that the last line is "A kid'll eat ivy, too; wouldn't you?"

== Deliberate mondegreen ==
Two authors have written books of supposed foreign-language poetry that are actually mondegreens of nursery rhymes in English. Luis van Rooten's pseudo-French Mots D'Heures: Gousses, Rames includes critical, historical, and interpretive apparatus, as does John Hulme's Mörder Guss Reims, attributed to a fictitious German poet. Both titles sound like the phrase "Mother Goose Rhymes". Both works can also be considered soramimi, which produces different meanings when interpreted in another language. The genre of animutation is based on deliberate mondegreen.

Wolfgang Amadeus Mozart produced a similar effect in his canon "Difficile Lectu" (Difficult to Read), which, though ostensibly in Latin, is actually an opportunity for scatological humor in both German and Italian.

Some performers and writers have used deliberate mondegreens to create double entendres. The phrase "if you see Kay" (F-U-C-K) has been employed many times, notably as a line from James Joyce's 1922 novel Ulysses.

"Mondegreen" is a song by Yeasayer on their 2010 album, Odd Blood. The lyrics are intentionally obscure (for instance, "Everybody sugar in my bed" and "Perhaps the pollen in the air turns us into a stapler") and spoken hastily to encourage the mondegreen effect.

Anguish Languish is an ersatz language created by Howard L. Chace. A play on the words "English Language", it is based on homophonic transformations of English words and consists entirely of deliberate mondegreens that seem nonsensical in print but are more easily understood when spoken aloud. A notable example is the story "Ladle Rat Rotten Hut" ("Little Red Riding Hood"), which appears in his collection of stories and poems, Anguish Languish (Prentice-Hall, 1956).

== Related linguistic phenomena ==
Closely related categories are Hobson-Jobson, where a word from a foreign language is homophonically translated into one's own language, e.g. "cockroach" from Spanish cucaracha, and soramimi, a Japanese term for deliberate homophonic misinterpretation of words for humor.

An unintentionally incorrect use of similar-sounding words or phrases, resulting in a changed meaning, is a malapropism. If there is a connection in meaning, it may be called an eggcorn. If a person stubbornly continues to mispronounce a word or phrase after being corrected, that person has committed a mumpsimus.

Related phenomena include:

- Earworm
- Eggcorn
- Holorime
- Homophonic translation
- Hypercorrection
- Phono-semantic matching
- Rebracketing
- Spoonerism
- Syntactic ambiguity

== Non-English languages ==
=== Croatian and Serbian ===
Queen's song "Another One Bites the Dust" has a long-standing history as a mondegreen in Croatian and Serbian, misheard as "Radovan baca daske" and "Радован баца даске" respectively, which means "Radovan throws planks".

=== Czech ===
In the Czech anthem, "Kde domov můj", the sentence bory šumí po skalinách ("midst the rocks sigh fragrant pine groves") is sometimes misheard as Boryš umí po skalinách ("Boryš is good at mountaineering").

Another popular Czech mondegreen is in the lyrics of "Nina" by singer-songwriter Tomáš Klus, where the sentence ...když padnou mi na rety slzy múz ("When the tears of muses fall on my lips") is often misheard as ...když padnou minarety, slzy múz ("When the minarets fall, tears of muses"). The mondegreen is caused by the singer using an uncommon declension of the word ret ('lip'); the more common form would be rty instead of rety.

The Czech radio station Radio Kiss has a programme called Hej šašo, nemáš džus?, where listeners can send their mondegreens. The show is named after a mondegreen from the song "Highway to Hell", in which the lyric "hey Satan, payin' my dues" was misheard as "Hej šašo, nemáš džus?" ("Hey clown, do you have juice?").

=== Dutch ===
In Dutch, mondegreens are popularly referred to as Mama appelsap ("Mommy applejuice"), from the Michael Jackson song "Wanna Be Startin' Somethin'" which features the lyrics Mama-se mama-sa ma-ma-coo-sa, and was once misheard as Mama say mama sa mam[a]appelsap. The Dutch radio station 3FM show Superrradio (originally Timur Open Radio), run by Timur Perlin and Ramon, featured an item in which listeners were encouraged to send in mondegreens under the name "Mama appelsap". The segment was popular for years.

=== French ===
In French, the phenomenon is also known as hallucination auditive, especially when referring to pop songs.

The title of the film La Vie en Rose ("Life In Pink" literally; "Life Through Rose-Coloured Glasses" more broadly), depicting the life of Édith Piaf, can be mistaken for L'Avion Rose ("The Pink Airplane").

The title of the 1983 French novel Le Thé au harem d'Archi Ahmed ("Tea in the Harem of Archi Ahmed") by Mehdi Charef (and the 1985 movie of the same name) is based on the main character mishearing le théorème d'Archimède ("the theorem of Archimedes") in his mathematics class.

=== German ===
Mondegreens are a well-known phenomenon in German, especially where non-German songs are concerned. They are sometimes called, after a well-known example, Agathe Bauer-songs ("I got the power", a song by Snap!, misinterpreted as a German female name). Journalist Axel Hacke published a series of books about them, beginning with Der weiße Neger Wumbaba ("The White Negro Wumbaba", a mishearing of the line der weiße Nebel wunderbar from "Der Mond ist aufgegangen").

In urban legend, children's paintings of nativity scenes, occasionally include next to the Child, Mary, Joseph, and so on, an additional, laughing creature known as the Owi. The reason is to be found in the line Gottes Sohn! O wie lacht / Lieb' aus Deinem göttlichen Mund ("God's Son! Oh, how does love laugh out of Thy divine mouth!") from the song "Silent Night". The subject is Lieb, a poetic contraction of die Liebe leaving off the final -e and the definite article, so that the phrase might be misunderstood as being about a person named Owi laughing "in a loveable manner". Owi lacht has been used as the title of at least one book about Christmas and Christmas songs.

=== Hebrew ===
Ghil'ad Zuckermann mentions the example mukhrakhím liyót saméakh (מוכרחים להיות שמח, which means "we must be happy", with a grammatical error) as a mondegreen of the original úru 'akhím belév saméakh (עורו אחים בלב שמח, which means "wake up, brothers, with a happy heart"). Although this line is taken from the extremely well-known song "Háva Nagíla" ("Let's be happy"), given the Hebrew high-register of úru (עורו "wake up!"), Israelis often mishear it.

An Israeli site dedicated to Hebrew mondegreens has coined the term avatiach (אבטיח, Hebrew for "watermelon") for "mondegreen", named for a common mishearing of Shlomo Artzi's award-winning 1970 song "Ahavtia" ("I loved her", using a form uncommon in spoken Hebrew).

=== Hungarian ===
One of the most well-known Hungarian mondegreens is connected to the 1984 song "Live Is Life" by the Austrian band Opus. The gibberish labadab dab dab phrase in the song was commonly misunderstood by Hungarians as levelet kaptam (Hungarian for "I have received mail"), which was later immortalized by the cult movie Moscow Square depicting the life of teenagers in the late 1980s.

=== Icelandic ===
The song "Álfar" by Magnús Þór Sigmundsson contains the line Eru álfar kannski menn? ("Are elves perhaps people?") which is often misheard as Eru álfar danskir menn? ("Are elves Danish people?").

=== Indonesian ===
The word "mendengarku" ("hear me") in Ghea Indrawari's song, "Teramini", is misheard as "mantan aku" ("my ex") or "makananku" ("my food").

=== Japanese ===
"Caramelldansen", a Swedish song which gained popularity in Japan during the early 21st century, contains the lyric "Dansa med oss, klappa era händer" ("Dance with us, clap your hands"), which was sometimes misinterpreted as "バルサミコ酢やっぱいらへんで" ("barusamiko-su yappa irahen de"), which translates to "I don't want any balsamic vinegar after all". This was then included in the official Japanese translation of the song.

=== Polish ===
A paper in phonology cites memoirs of the poet Antoni Słonimski, who confessed that in the recited poem Konrad Wallenrod he used to hear zwierz Alpuhary ("a beast of Alpujarras") rather than z wież Alpuhary ("from the towers of Alpujarras").

=== Russian ===
In 1875 Fyodor Dostoyevsky cited a line from Fyodor Glinka's song "Troika" (1825), колокольчик, дар Валдая ("the bell, gift of Valday"), stating that it is usually understood as колокольчик, дарвалдая ("the bell darvaldaying"—supposedly an onomatopoeia of ringing sounds).

=== Slovak ===
In Slovakia, the lyrics "God found good people staying for brother" from the song "Survive" by Laurent Wolf and Andrew Roachford was often misheard as Kaufland kúpil Zdeno z Popradu ("Zdeno from Poprad bought the Kaufland"). The mondegreen became so popular that a radio station, Fun rádio, created a broadcast called Hity Zdena z Popradu ("Hits of Zdeno from Poprad") where listeners can send mondegreens and overheard lyrics.

=== Spanish ===
The Mexican national anthem contains the verse Mas si osare un extraño enemigo ("If, however, a foreign enemy would dare") using mas and osare, archaic poetic forms. The verse has sometimes been misunderstood as Masiosare, un extraño enemigo ("Masiosare, a strange enemy") with Masiosare, an otherwise unused word, as the name of the enemy. "Masiosare" has been used in Mexico as a first name for real and fictional people and as a common name (masiosare or the homophone maciosare) for the anthem itself or for a threat against the country.

=== Yiddish ===
The expression באָבע־מעשׂה (bobe-mayse, "grandmother's tale") was originally a misunderstanding of בָּבָא־מעשׂה (bovo-mayse, "Bovo story"), a story from the Bovo-Bukh.

== See also ==
- Am I Right – website with a large collection of misheard lyrics
- "Bennie and the Jets"
- Bushism
- Folk etymology
- Mad Gab
- Pareidolia
- Parody music
- Yanny or Laurel
