= The New Grove Dictionary of Music and Musicians =

Encyclopaedic dictionary of music and musicians

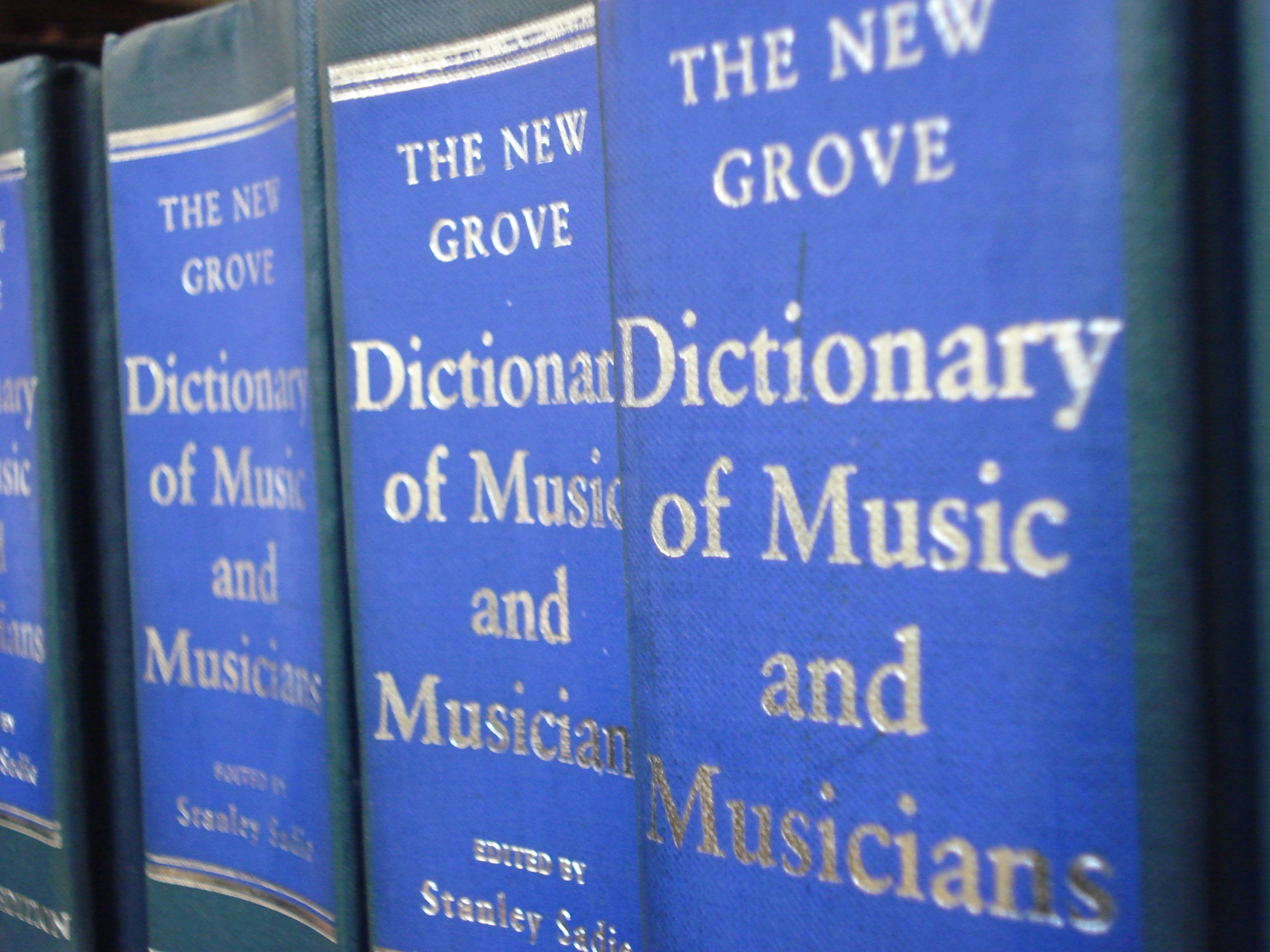
- Author: Multiple
- Original title: A Dictionary of Music and Musicians
- Language: English
- Subject: Music, musicology, music history, music theory, ethnomusicology
- Genre: Reference; encyclopaedic dictionary
- Publisher: Oxford University Press
- Publication date: 1878–present
- Publication place: United Kingdom, United States
- Media type: hardback, paperback, and online
- Text: The New Grove Dictionary of Music and Musicians at Wikisource
- Website: www.oxfordmusiconline.com/grovemusic/

The New Grove Dictionary of Music and Musicians is an encyclopaedic dictionary of music and musicians. Along with the German-language Die Musik in Geschichte und Gegenwart, it is one of the largest reference works on the history and theory of music. Earlier editions were published under the titles A Dictionary of Music and Musicians, and Grove's Dictionary of Music and Musicians; the work has gone through several editions since the 19th century and is widely used. In recent years it has been made available as an electronic resource called Grove Music Online, which has become an important part of Oxford Music Online.

== A Dictionary of Music and Musicians ==
A Dictionary of Music and Musicians was first published in London by Macmillan and Co. in four volumes (1879, 1880, 1883, 1889) edited by George Grove with an Appendix edited by J. A. Fuller Maitland in the fourth volume. An Index edited by Mrs. E. Wodehouse was issued as a separate volume in 1890. In 1900, minor corrections were made to the plates and the entire series was reissued in four volumes, with the index added to volume 4. The original edition and the reprint are now freely available online. (Note: The volumes of the first edition were published as follows: Vol. 1 (1879) A – Impromptu Vol. 2 (1880) Improperia – Plain Song Vol. 3 (1883) Planché – Sumer is icumen in Vol. 4 (1889) Sumer is icumen in – Z, Appendix, Supplement Index (1890) • Text-searchable copies are available at Google Books: vols. 1, 2, 3, 4, Index. • Additional copies (non-searchable PDF image files) are also available for download at IMSLP.) (Note: The 1900 reprint is available in text-searchable format at Wikisource: vols.1, 2, 3, 4. (Vol. 4 includes the Appendix, Index, and a catalogue of articles listed by author.)) Grove limited the chronological span of his work to begin at 1450 while continuing up to his time.

== Grove's Dictionary of Music and Musicians ==
The second edition (Grove II), in five volumes, was edited by Fuller Maitland and published from 1904 to 1910, this time as Grove's Dictionary of Music and Musicians. The individual volumes of the second edition were reprinted many times. An American Supplement edited by Waldo Selden Pratt and Charles N. Boyd was published in 1920 in Philadelphia by Theodore Presser. This edition removed the first edition's beginning date of 1450, though important earlier composers and theorists are still missing from this edition. These volumes are also now freely available online. (Note: The volumes of the second edition were published as follows: Vol. 1 (1904) A–E (OCLC 250954613) Vol. 2 (1906) F–L (OCLC 250954626) Vol. 3 (1907) M–P (OCLC 250953930) Vol. 4 (1908) Q–S (OCLC 252807560) Vol. 5 (1910) T–Z, Appendix (OCLC 252807569) • Text-searchable copies are available at: • Internet Archive: vols. 1, 2, 3, 4, 5 • Google Books: vols. 1, 2, 3, 4, 5. • Copies (non-searchable PDF image files) are also available for download at IMSLP.) (Note: For the American Supplement published in 1920, see OCLC 1077116, searchable copy at Google Books, and IMSLP file #93522.)

The third edition (Grove III), also in five volumes, was an extensive revision of the 2nd edition; it was edited by H. C. Colles and published in 1927. The 3rd edition was reprinted several times. An American Supplement was published in the US in 1927, and also later reprinted separately.

An extra-large Supplementary Volume also edited by Colles was published in 1940 and called the fourth edition (Grove IV). (Note: For the 4th edition Supplementary Volume published in New York, see OCLC 248932279. For the 4th edition Supplementary Volume published in London, see OCLC 493270221.) A reprint of the 3rd edition with some corrections, was released at the same time. The five-volume 3rd edition, with the Supplementary Volume as volume 6, and the American Supplement of the 3rd edition as volume 7, were reprinted together as a set in 1945. (Note: For the reprinted American Supplement published in New York, see OCLC 74811413.)

The fifth edition (Grove V), in nine volumes, was edited by Eric Blom and published in 1954. This was the most thoroughgoing revision of the work since its inception, with many articles rewritten in a more modern style and a large number of entirely new articles. Many of the articles were written by Blom personally, or translated by him. An additional Supplementary Volume prepared by Eric Blom and completed by Denis Stevens after Blom's death in 1959, was issued in 1961. The fifth edition was reprinted in 1966, 1968, 1970, 1973, and 1975, each time with numerous corrections, updates, and other small changes.

== The New Grove ==
=== First edition ===
The next edition was published in 1980 under the name The New Grove Dictionary of Music and Musicians and was greatly expanded to 20 volumes with 22,500 articles and 16,500 biographies. Its senior editor was Stanley Sadie with Nigel Fortune also serving as one of the main editors for the publication.

It was reprinted with minor corrections each subsequent year until 1995, except 1982 and 1983. In the mid-1990s, the hardback set sold for about $2,300. A paperback edition was reprinted in 1995 which sold for $500.

- ISBN 0-333-23111-2 – hardback
- ISBN 1-56159-174-2 – paperback
- ISBN 0-333-73250-2 – British special edition
- ISBN 1-56159-229-3 – American special edition

=== Spin-offs ===
Some sections of The New Grove were also issued as small sets and individual books on particular topics. These typically were enhanced with expanded and updated material and included individual and grouped composer biographies, a four-volume dictionary of American music (1984; revised 2013, 8 vols.), a three-volume dictionary of musical instruments (1984), a four-volume dictionary of opera (1992), and a volume on women composers (1994).

=== Second edition ===
In 2001, the 2nd edition under this title (the 7th overall) was published, in 29 volumes. It was also made available by subscription on the Internet in a service called Grove Music Online. It was again edited by Stanley Sadie, and the executive editor was John Tyrrell. It was originally going to also be released on CD-ROM, but this plan was dropped. As Sadie writes in the preface: "The biggest single expansion in the present edition has been in the coverage of 20th-century composers."

This edition was subjected to some criticism owing to the significant number of typographical and factual errors that it contained, but it also received some positive reviews.

== New Grove Dictionary of Jazz ==
- Kernfeld, Barry Dean, ed. (2002). The New Grove Dictionary of Jazz (3 Vols.). Associate eds.: Gary William Kennedy (born 1961) and Howard Willett Rye (born 1947) (2nd ed.). London: Macmillan Publishers & Oxford University Press.
1. Vol. 1: "A–Fuzz" – via Internet Archive (Kahle/Austin Foundation; Manhasset Public Library).
2. Vol. 2: "Gabler–Niewood" – via Internet Archive (Kahle/Austin Foundation; St. John Fisher University).
3. Vol. 3: "Nightclubs–Zwingenberger".

LCCN 2001-40794
ISBN 978-1-5615-9284-5, 1-5615-9284-6 (US ISBN, 3 Vol. set)
ISBN 978-0-3336-9189-2, 0-3336-9189-X (British ISBN, 3 Vol. set)
ISBN 978-0-1953-8699-8, 0-1953-8699-X (Vol. 1)
ISBN 978-0-1953-8700-1, 0-1953-8700-7 (Vol. 2)
ISBN 978-0-1953-8701-8, 0-1953-8701-5 (Vol. 3)

OCLC 46956628 (all editions).

== Grove Music Online and Oxford Music Online ==
The complete text of The New Grove is available to subscribers to the online service Grove Music Online. Oxford Music Online is a gateway to Grove Music Online as well as The Oxford Dictionary of Music and The Oxford Companion to Music.

Grove Music Online includes a large number of revisions and additions of new articles. In addition to the 29 volumes of The New Grove second edition, Grove Music Online incorporates the four-volume New Grove Dictionary of Opera (ed. Stanley Sadie, 1992) and the three-volume New Grove Dictionary of Jazz, second edition (ed. Barry Kernfeld, 2002), The Grove Dictionary of American Music and The Grove Dictionary of Musical Instruments, comprising a total of more than 50,000 articles. The current editor-in-chief of Grove Music, the name given to the complete slate of print and online resources that encompass the Grove brand, is University of Pittsburgh professor Deane Root. He assumed the editorship in 2009.

The dictionary, originally published by Macmillan, was sold in 2004 to Oxford University Press. Since 2001 Grove Music Online has served as a cornerstone of Oxford University Press's larger online research tool Oxford Music Online, which remains a subscription-based service. As well as being available to individual and educational subscribers, it is available for use at many public and university libraries worldwide, through institutional subscriptions. The Wikipedia Library provides access to Oxford Music Online to any registered editor whose account is at least 6 months old, has 500 total global edits and at least 10 edits in the last 30 days (see The Wikipedia Library: Oxford Music Online).

Grove Music Online identifies itself as the eighth edition of the overall work.

== Contents ==
The 2001 edition contains:

- 29,499 articles in total
  - 5,623 entirely new articles
- 20,374 biographies of composers, performers and writers on music
  - 96 articles on theatre directors
- 1,465 articles on styles, terms and genres
  - 283 articles on concepts
- 805 articles on regions, countries and cities
  - 580 articles on ancient music and church music
  - 1,327 articles on world musics
  - 1,221 articles on popular music, light music, and jazz
- 2,261 articles on instruments and their makers, and performance practice
  - 89 articles on acoustics
- 693 articles on printing and publishing
  - 174 articles on notation
  - 131 articles on sources

== Hoaxes and parodies ==
Two non-existent composers have appeared in the work:

Dag Henrik Esrum-Hellerup was the subject of a hoax entry in the 1980 New Grove. Esrum-Hellerup's surname derives from a Danish village and a suburb of Copenhagen. The writer of the entry was Robert Layton. Though successfully introduced into the encyclopaedia, Esrum-Hellerup appeared in the first printing only: soon exposed as a hoax, the entry was removed and the space filled with an illustration. In 1983, the Danish organist Henry Palsmar founded an amateur choir, the Esrum-Hellerup Choir, along with several former pupils of the Song School, St. Annae Gymnasium in Copenhagen.

Guglielmo Baldini was the name of a non-existent composer who was the subject of a hoax entry in the 1980 edition. Unlike Esrum-Hellerup, Baldini was not a modern creation: his name and biography were in fact created almost a century earlier by the German musicologist Hugo Riemann. The New Grove entry on Baldini was supported by a fictional reference in the form of an article supposedly in the Archiv für Freiburger Diözesan Geschichte. Though successfully introduced into the encyclopaedia, Baldini appeared in the first printing only: soon exposed as a hoax, the entry was removed.

Seven parody entries, written by contributors to the 1980 edition, and full of musical puns and dictionary in-jokes, were published in the February 1981 issue of The Musical Times (which was also edited by Stanley Sadie at the time). These entries never appeared in the dictionary itself and are:

- Brown, "Mother" (Mary) (b. 1550; d. Wapping, 3 January 1611)
- Ear-flute
- Hameln [Hamelin]
- Khan't, Genghis (Tamburlaine) (b. Ulan Bator, c. 1880; d. New York, 22 November 1980)
- Stainglit (Nevers), Sait d'Ail (fl Middle Ages) – i.e. "Stanley Sadie", following the example of Luis van Rooten
- Toblerone
- Verdi, Lasagne ['Il Bolognese'] (b. Bologna, 10 October 1813; d. Naples, 15 March 1867)
