= Bilingual pun =

Pun that utilizes words or phrases from multiple languages

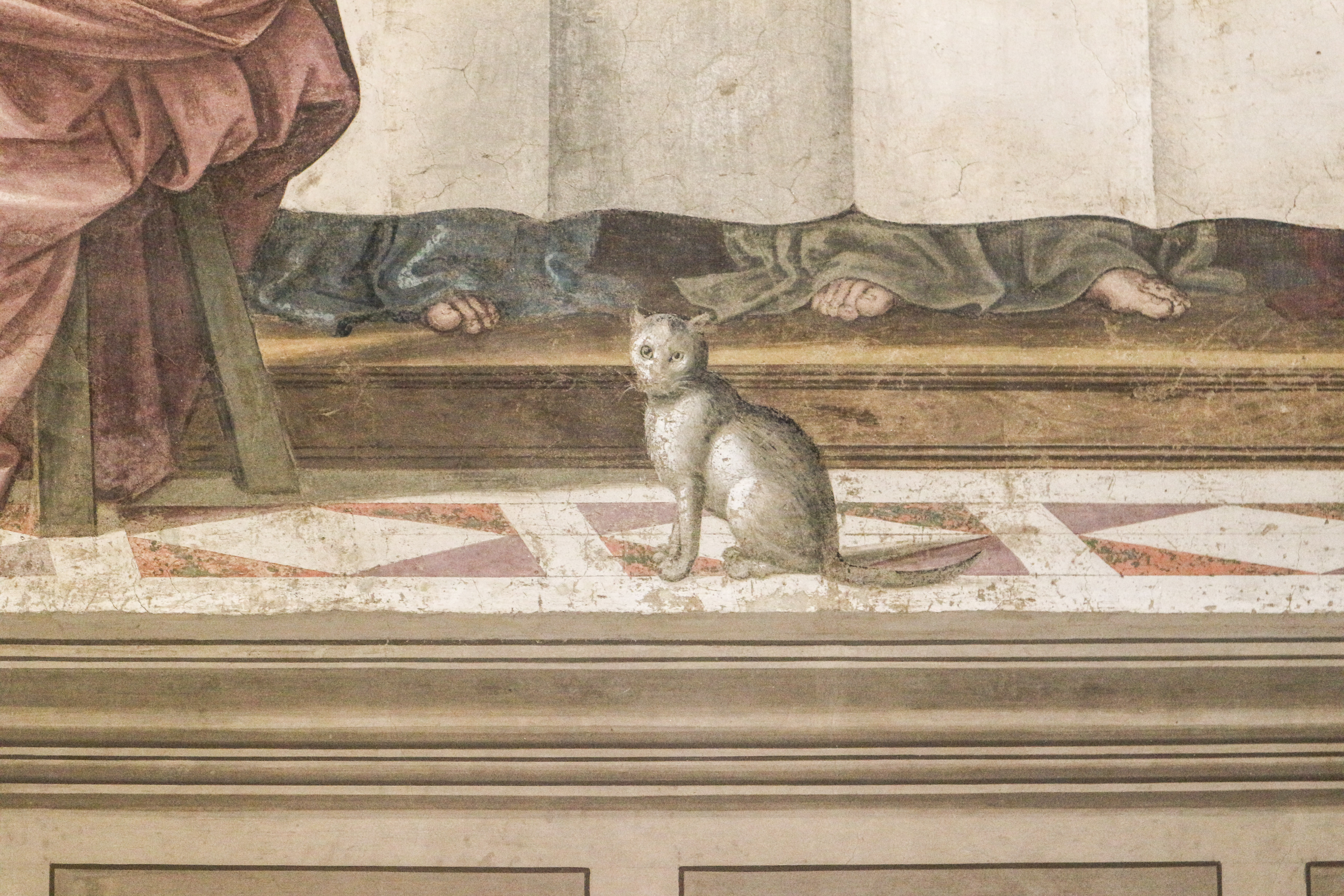
A bilingual pun: Where do cats go when they die? In English PURRgatory, in Spanish PurGATOrio.

A bilingual pun is a pun created by a word or phrase in one language sounding similar to a different word or phrase in another language. The result of a bilingual pun can be a joke that makes sense in more than one language (a joke that can be translated) or a joke which requires understanding of both languages (a joke specifically for those that are bilingual). A bilingual pun can be made with a word from another language that has the same meaning, or an opposite meaning.

== Description ==
A bilingual pun involves a word from one language which has the same or similar meaning in another language's word. The word is often homophonic whether on purpose or by accident. Another feature of the bilingual pun is that the person does not always need to have the ability to speak both languages in order to understand the pun. The bilingual pun can also demonstrate common ground with a person who speaks another language.

== Examples ==
=== Biblical ===
There are what appear to be Biblical bilingual puns. In Exodus 10:10, Moses is warned by the Egyptian Pharaoh that evil awaits him. In Hebrew the word "ra" (רע) means evil, but in Egyptian "Ra" is the sun god. So when Moses was warned, the word "ra" can mean the sun god stands in the way, or evil stands in the way.

=== Literature ===
Unintentional bilingual puns occur in translations of one of Shakespeare's plays: Henry V. The line spoken by Katherine, "I cannot speak your England" becomes political in French.

=== Mathematics ===
The famous paper “Fun with F_{1}” is a French-English pun as 1 is un in French.

=== Gaming ===
Wario's name is a portmanteau of the name Mario and the Japanese word warui (悪い), meaning "bad", reflecting how he is a bad version of Mario. In English, Wario may be seen as a portmanteau of the name Mario and "war", or as a flip of the M in "Mario".

== See also ==
- Calque
- Code mixing
- Eggcorn
- Homophonic translation
- Lists of English words by country or language of origin
- Loanword
- Macaronic language
- Phono-semantic matching
- Soramimi
- Translation
