= Anguish Languish =

Ersatz language

The Anguish Languish is an ersatz language constructed from similar-sounding English language words. It was created by Howard L. Chace circa 1940, and he later collected his stories and poems in the book Anguish Languish (Prentice-Hall, 1956). It is not really a language but rather humorous homophonic transformation. Example: "Ladle Rat Rotten Hut" means "Little Red Riding Hood" and "Mural: Yonder nor sorghum stenches shut ladle gulls stopper torque wet strainers" means: "Moral: Under no circumstances should little girls stop to talk with strangers".

Chace offered this description: "The Anguish Languish consists only of the purest of English words, and its chief raison d'être is to demonstrate the marvelous versatility of a language in which almost anything can, if necessary, be made to mean something else." His story "Ladle Rat Rotten Hut" is "Little Red Riding Hood" rewritten with similar-sounding words (all of them legitimate words in themselves, but with unrelated meanings) substituting for the original folk tale. A professor of French, Chace wrote "Ladle Rat Rotten Hut" in 1940 to demonstrate that the intonation of spoken English is almost as important to the meaning as the words themselves. It was first published in Gene Sherman's "Cityside" column in the Los Angeles Times in 1953, reprinted in the San Francisco Chronicle and in the first issue of Sports Illustrated in 1954.

== Book ==
First edition (publ. Prentice-Hall)

After Arthur Godfrey read "Ladle Rat Rotten Hut" on one of his programs, audience members made thousands of requests for copies of the story. This prompted the publication of Chace's stories and nursery rhymes in Anguish Languish, illustrated with cartoons by Hal Doremus.

In the Anguish Languish, all of the "real" words are replaced. Sometimes, a single word replaces several in the correct version (e.g., "evanescent" from "if it isn't"), and sometimes several words replace one longer word ("on forger nut" for "unfortunate"). Every word can be found in most collegiate dictionaries.

Although written with a serious purpose in mind, the humorous aspects cannot be ignored, especially with Chace's additions of phrases not in the traditional stories ("A nervous sausage bag ice!" for "I never saw such big eyes!") and added plot twists.

== Bibliography ==
- Chace, Howard L. (1956). Anguish Languish [English Language]. Englewood Cliffs, N.J.: Prentice-Hall. OCLC 2539398.
- Chace, Howard L. (1956). Ladle Rat Rotten Hut. Pittsburgh, Pennsylvania: Oldstyle Press. OCLC 49208995.

== See also ==
- Afferbeck Lauder
- Homophonic translation
- Mondegreen
- Mots d'Heures: Gousses, Rames: The d'Antin Manuscript
- N'Heures Souris Rames
- Phono-semantic matching
