= Holorime =

Identical pronunciation of different lines of poetry

Holorime (or holorhyme) is a form of rhyme where two very similar sequences of sounds can form phrases composed of different words and with different meanings. For example, the two lines of Miles Kington's poem "A Lowlands Holiday Ends in Enjoyable Inactivity" are pronounced the same in some British English dialects: (Note: The pronunciation required is /ɪˈnɛərʃəhɪˈlɛəriəzəˈkruːzeɪlæs/ but the second line requires /s/ in "hilarious" rather than a repeat of /z/)

In Ayrshire hill areas, a cruise, eh, lass?
Inertia, hilarious, accrues, hélas!

Holorime pairs may also be referred to as oronyms.

== In French ==
In French poetry, rime richissime ("very rich rhyme") is a rhyme of more than three phonemes. A holorime is an extreme example. For example (Marc Monnier): Also called rime multimillionnaire (see https://fr.wiktionary.org/wiki/rime_millionnaire )

Gall, amant de la Reine, alla, tour magnanime ! (Gallus, the Queen's lover, went – a magnanimous gesture! –)
Gall amant de la Reine a l'atour magnanime ! (Gallus the Queen's lover has magnanimous looks! -Proper version-! –)
Galamment de l'Arène à la Tour Magne, à Nîmes. (Gallantly from the Arena to the Great Tower, at Nîmes.)"
pronounced [ɡa.la.mɑ̃.d(ə.)la.ʁɛ(ː).na.la.tuʁ.ma.ɲa.nim]

Another notable French exponent of the holorime was Alphonse Allais:

Par les bois du djinn, où s'entasse de l'effroi, (By the woods of the djinn, where fear abounds,)
Parle et bois du gin, ou cent tasses de lait froid. (Talk and drink gin, or a hundred cups of cold milk.)
pronounced [paʁ.le.bwa.dy.dʒi.nu.sɑ̃.tas.d(ə.)lɛ.fʁwa]

French lends itself to humorous wordplay because of its large number of heterographic homophones:

Ma mère est maire de Mamers, et mon frère est masseur. (My mother is the mayor of Mamers, and my brother is a masseur.)
Ma mère est mère de ma mère, et mon frère est ma sœur. (My mother is my mother's mother, and my brother is my sister.)
pronounced [ma mɛʁ ɛ mɛ(ː)ʁ də ma.mɛʁ e mɔ̃ fʁɛʁ ɛ ma.sœʁ]

Lundi et mardi, mercredi, jeudi, vendredimanche, samedi (Monday and Tuesday, Wednesday, Thursday, Frisunday, Saturday.)
L'un dit, et m'a redit mercredi, « Je dis, vendre dix manches, ça me dit ! » (Someone said, and repeated it to me on Wednesday, "I say, selling ten sleeves, I'd like that!")
pronounced [lœ̃.di.e.maʁ.di.mɛʁ.kʁə.di.ʒø.di vɑ̃.dʁə.di.mɑ̃ʃ.sam.di]

== In Japanese ==
A type of holorime in which the meaning changes based on where word boundaries are placed in the phrase is known as ginatayomi (ぎなた読み) in Japanese. The word itself is a ginatayomi since it arises from a misreading:

Benkei ga, naginata wo motte 弁慶が、長刀を持って (Benkei, take the naginata)
Benkei gana, ginata wo motte 弁慶がな、ぎなたを持って (Oi Benkei, take the ginata)

These words are consequently also known as Benkei-yomi. Ginata is a nonsense word, but in many famous examples, the meaning of the phrase changes based on the word boundaries:

Pan tsukutta koto aru? パン作ったことある？ (Have you ever made bread?)
Pantsu kutta koto aru? パンツ食ったことある？ (Have you ever eaten underpants?)

Koko de hakimono wo nuite kudasai ここで履物を脱いでください (Please take off your shoes here)
Koko dewa kimono wo nuite kudasai ここでは着物を脱いでください (Please take off your clothes here)

== Other examples ==
A mondegreen (or in Japanese soramimi) is a holorime generated by misheard song lyrics, such as mishearing "'scuse me while I kiss the sky" as "'scuse me while I kiss this guy."

A homophonic translation is a holorime or near-holorime where the two homophonic or near-homophonic readings come from different languages, such as "Humpty Dumpty" in English and "Un petit d'un petit" in French. Homophonic translations are a specific form of macaronic wordplay.

French author Raymond Roussel described his writing process as a method of connecting two sentences that were holorimes of each other, "I chose two similar words. For example, billard (billiard) and pillard (looter). Then I added to it words similar but taken in two different directions, and I obtained two almost identical sentences thus. The two sentences found, it was a question of writing a tale which can start with the first and finish by the second."

== See also ==
- Homophone
- Homophonic translation
- Lion-Eating Poet in the Stone Den
- Word play
