= Mumpsimus =

Obstinate adherence to custom, habit or error

A mumpsimus (/ˈmʌmpsɪməs/ MUHMP-sih-məs) is a "traditional custom obstinately adhered to however unreasonable it may be", or "someone who obstinately clings to an error, bad habit or prejudice, even after the foible has been exposed and the person humiliated; also, any error, bad habit, or prejudice clung to in this fashion". The term originates in the story of a priest using the nonsense word mumpsimus instead of the Latin sumpsimus when giving mass, during the prayer "Quod ore súmpsimus, Dómine, pura mente capiámus" ("What has passed our lips as food, O Lord, may we possess in purity of heart"), and refusing to be corrected on the matter. The word may refer to either the speaker or their habit.

Over time, the contrasting term sumpsimus came into use. To Henry VIII, a sumpsimus is a correction that is unnecessarily litigious or argumentative, but John Burgon used the term for corrections that may be good but are not as important as others.

== Origin ==
The term originates from an apocryphal story about a poorly educated Catholic priest saying Latin mass who, in reciting the postcommunion prayer Quod ore sumpsimus, Domine (meaning: 'What we have received in the mouth, Lord'), substitutes the non-word mumpsimus, perhaps as a mondegreen. After being made aware of his mistake, he nevertheless persisted with his erroneous version, whether from stubbornness, force of habit, or refusing to believe he was mistaken.

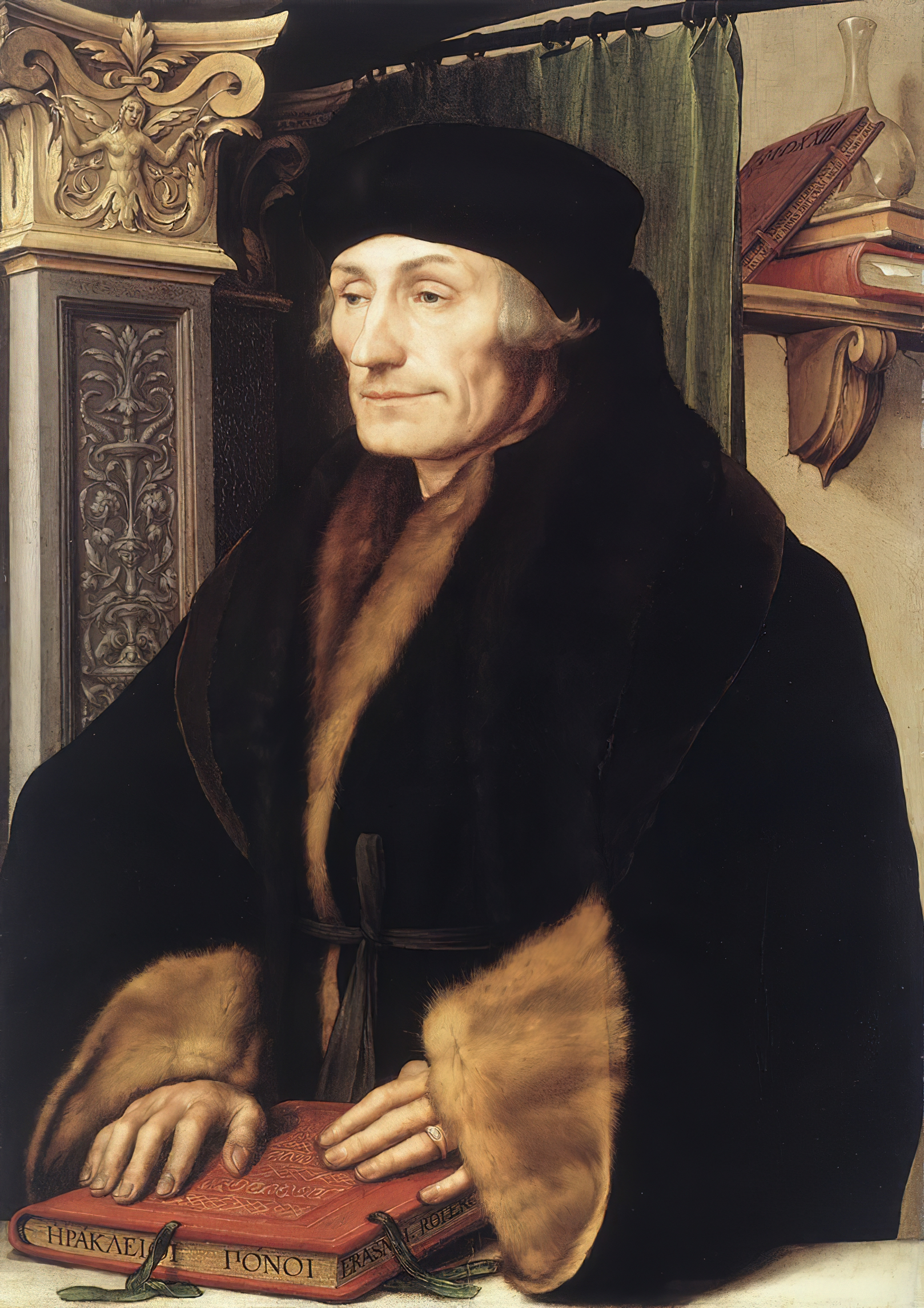
The Renaissance humanist scholar Desiderius Erasmus of Rotterdam may have coined the word.

The story was told by Desiderius Erasmus (1466–1536) in a letter he wrote in August 1516 to Henry Bullock. Erasmus used it as an analogy with those who refused to accept that Novum Instrumentum omne, his edition of the Greek New Testament, corrected errors in the Latin Vulgate. The English diplomat Richard Pace (1482–1536) included a variant in his 1517 work De Fructu qui ex Doctrina Percipitur, where the priest was English and had been saying mumpsimus for thirty years when corrected. While Pace's book (written in Latin) is credited by the first edition of the Oxford English Dictionary as the origin of mumpsimus, Pace acknowledged his borrowing in a 1517 letter to Erasmus. "Mumpsimus and sumpsimus" became proverbial among Protestants in the early English Reformation.

== Usage ==
=== Mumpsimus ===
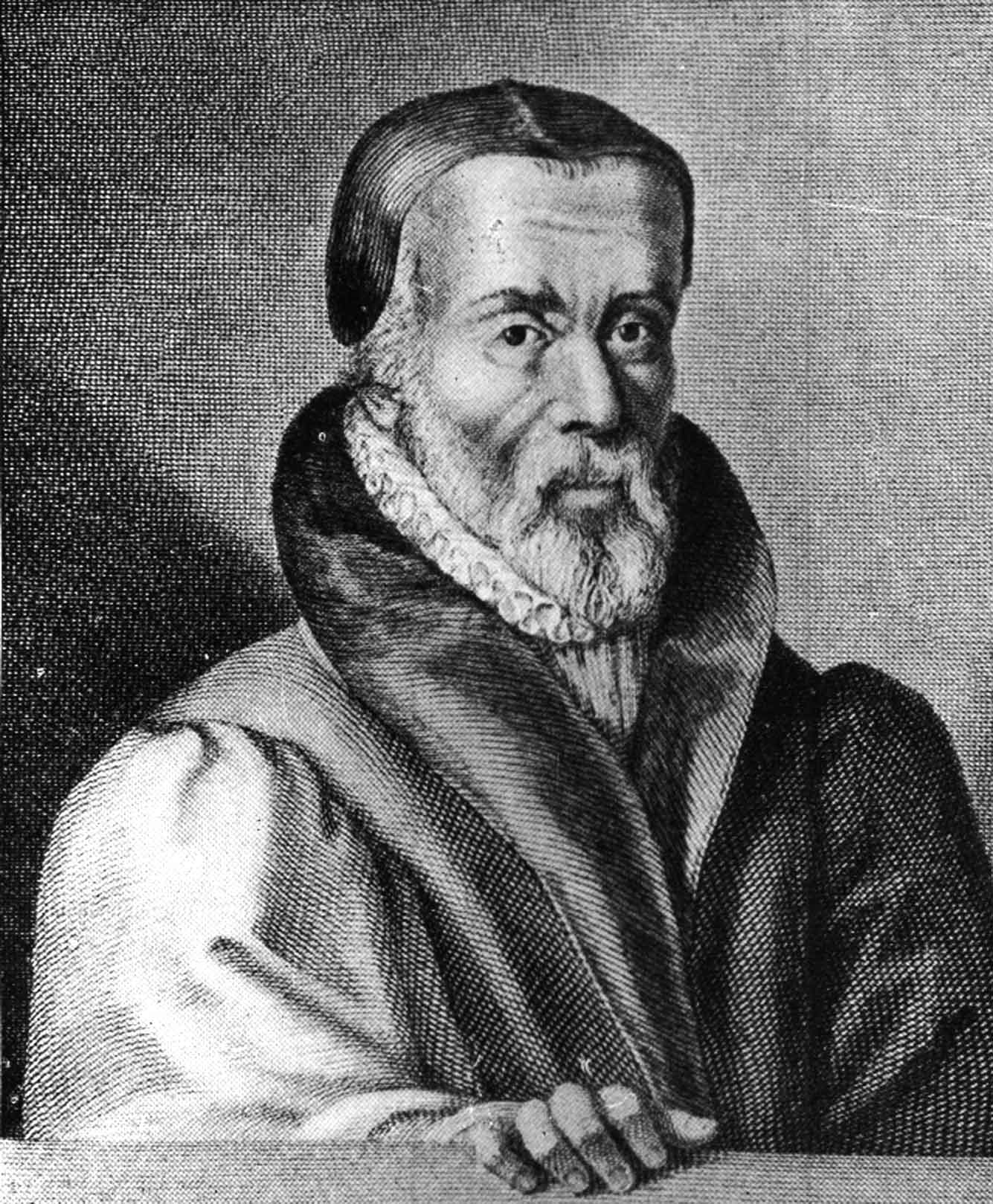
William Tyndale may have been the first to use the word in an English-language book.

Mumpsimus soon entered the language as a cant word widely used by 16th-century writers. In William Tyndale's 1530 book Practice of Prelates, the word was used in the sense of a stubborn opponent to Tyndale's views. He said that the men whom Cardinal Wolsey had asked to find reasons why Catherine of Aragon was not truly the wife of King Henry VIII of England were "all lawyers, and other doctors, mumpsimuses of divinity". Sir Thomas Elyot in 1531 in The Book of the Governor explains why he uses the term good courage instead of magnanimity thus: "this worde Magnanimitie beinge yet straunge, as late borowed out of the latyne, shall nat content all men, and specially them whome nothing contenteth out of their accustomed Mumpsimus, I will aduenture to put for Magnanimitie a worde more familiar, callynge it good courage".

Eugene T. Maleska, 1970s editor of The New York Times crossword puzzle, received "dozens of letters" after "mumpsimus" appeared as an answer; he had felt that "it was time to revive the obsolete noun". A. Leslie Derbyshire applied it in a 1981 management science book to managers who know how to do a better job but choose not to. Garner's Modern English Usage notes that the word could describe George W. Bush because of his persistent habit of pronouncing "nuclear" as "nucular", despite the error being widely reported.

=== Mumpsimus and sumpsimus ===
In his speech at the State Opening of Parliament on Christmas Eve 1545, Henry VIII said:

I see and hear daily, that you of the clergy preach one against another, teach, one contrary to another, inveigh one against another, without charity or discretion. Some be too stiff in their old mumpsimus, other be too busy and curious in their new sumpsimus. Thus, all men almost be in variety and discord, and few or none do preach, truly and sincerely, the word of God, according as they ought to do.

Peter Heylin refers to the king's saying in his 1631 The History of St. George of Cappadocia when he talks of "those self-conceited ones which are so stiffe—as King Harry used to say—in their new sumpsimus..." Hugh Latimer (1487–1555) used the term in two sermons he preached in 1552, saying that "[w]hen my neighbour is taught, and knoweth the truth, and will not believe it, but will abide in his old mumpsimus..." and again: "Some be so obstinate in their old mumpsimus, that they cannot abide the true doctrine of God."

In an 1883 polemic on errors in translations of the Christian Bible, John Burgon says, "If men prefer their 'mumpsimus' to our 'sumpsimus', let them by all means have it: but pray let them keep their rubbish to themselves—and at least leave our SAVIOUR's words alone."
