= David Melnick =

American poet

David Melnick (1938–2022) was a gay avant-garde American poet. He was born in Illinois and grew up in Los Angeles, California. He attended the University of Chicago and University of California, Berkeley.

Book One of Melnick's homophonic translation of Homer's Iliad, titled Men in Aïda, was published in 1983 by Lyn Hejinian's Tuumba Press. The farcical bathhouse scenario presented in Melnick's translation suggests underlying homoeroticism in the original text. Melnick's work has been included in Ron Silliman's 1986 anthology of Language poetry In the American Tree. Craig Dworkin and Kenneth Goldsmith wrote about Melnick's Men in Aïda in relation to conceptual poetics in 2010's Against Expression: An Anthology of Conceptual Writing. Often grouped with Language poetry, Melnick's Men in Aïda has been compared to Celia and Louis Zukofsky's Catullus and PCOET has been discussed alongside Russian Futurist Velimir Khlebnikov's zaum poetics.

== Bibliography ==
- Eclogs, Ithaca House, 1972
- "The ‘Ought’ of Seeing: Zukofsky's Bottom" in Maps. John Taggart, ed. 1973.
- PCOET, San Francisco: G.A.W.K., 1975
- Men in Aïda, Book One, Berkeley: Tuumba Press, 1983
- A Pin's Fee, 1988
- Men in Aïda, The Hague & Tirana: Uitgeverij. 2015. ISBN 9789491914041. This edition collects three books of Men in Aïda in a single volume.
