= Men in Aida =

Homophonic translation of the Iliad

- Author: David Melnick
- Subject: homophonic translation of ancient Greek into English
- Publisher: Tuumba Press
- Publication date: 1983
- Publication place: United States
- English publication date: 1983
- OCLC: 10763257

Men in Aida is a homophonic translation of Book One of Homer's Iliad into a farcical bathhouse scenario, perhaps alluding to the homoerotic aspects of ancient Greek culture. It was written by the language poet David Melnick and is an example of poetic postmodernism. In 2015, all three books of the Iliad translated by Melnick were published under a Creative Commons non-commercial license by the independent publishing house Uitgeverij under the title Men in Aïda.

It opens:

Men in Aida, they appeal, eh? A day, O Achilles.
Allow men in, emery Achaians. All gay ethic, eh?
Paul asked if team mousse suck, as Aida, pro, yaps in.

Corresponding to the Greek:

μῆνιν ἄειδε θεὰ Πηληϊάδεω Ἀχιλῆος
οὐλομένην, ἣ μυρί᾽ Ἀχαιοῖς ἄλγε᾽ ἔθηκε,
πολλὰς δ᾽ ἰφθίμους ψυχὰς Ἄϊδι προΐαψεν

Transliterated:

mēnin aeide theā pēlēiadeō Akhilēos
oulomenēn, he mūri' Akhaiois alge' ethēke,
pollās d' iphthīmous psukhas Aidi proiapsen

Literal translation:

The wrath sing, goddess, of Peleus' son, Achilles,
that destructive wrath which brought countless woes upon the Achaeans,
and sent forth to Hades many valiant souls
