= 1960 Pulitzer Prize =

Awards for journalism and related fields

The following are the Pulitzer Prizes for 1960.

== Journalism awards ==
- Public Service:
  - The Los Angeles Times, for its thorough, sustained and well-conceived attack on narcotics traffic and the enterprising reporting of Gene Sherman, which led to the opening of negotiations between the United States and Mexico to halt the flow of illegal drugs into southern California and other border states.
- Local Reporting, Edition Time:
  - Jack Nelson of The Atlanta Constitution, for the excellent reporting in his series of articles on mental institutions in Georgia.
- Local Reporting, No Edition Time:
  - Miriam Ottenberg of the Evening Star (Washington, DC), for a series of seven articles exposing a used-car racket in Washington, D.C., that victimized many unwary buyers. The series led to new regulations to protect the public and served to alert other communities to such sharp practices.
- National Reporting:
  - Vance Trimble of Scripps-Howard Newspaper Alliance, for a series of articles exposing the extent of nepotism in the Congress of the United States.
- International Reporting:
  - A. M. Rosenthal of The New York Times, for his perceptive and authoritative reporting from Poland. Mr. Rosenthal's subsequent expulsion from the country was attributed by Polish government spokesmen to the depth his reporting into Polish affairs, there being no accusation of false reporting.
- Editorial Writing:
  - Lenoir Chambers, editor of The Norfolk Virginian-Pilot, for his series of editorials on the school integration problem in Virginia, as exemplified by "The Year Virginia Closed the Schools", published January 1, 1959, and "The Year Virginia Opened the Schools", published December 31, 1959.
- Editorial Cartooning:
  - No award given.

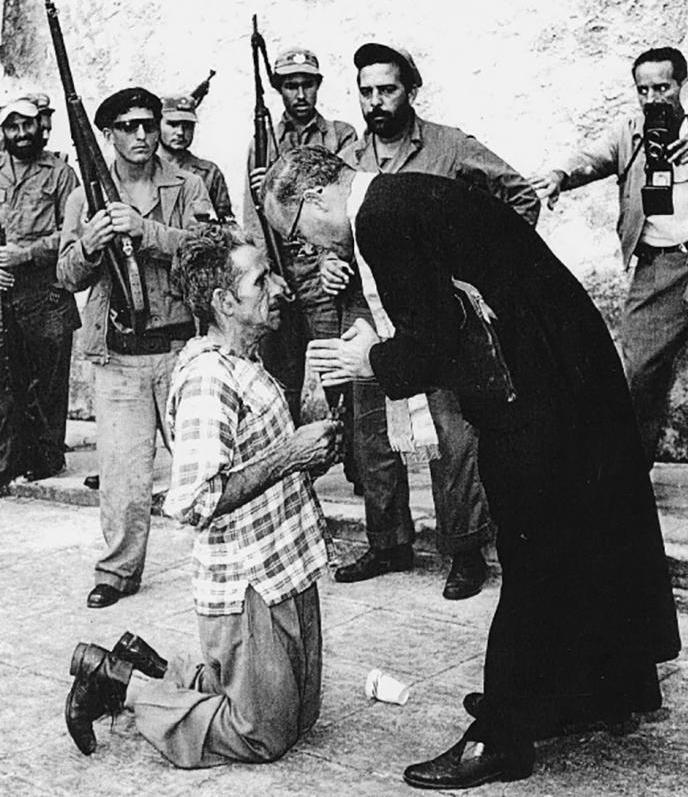
The principal picture in Andrew Lopez's prize-winning series of photographs

- Photography:
  - Andrew Lopez of United Press International, for his series of four photographs of a corporal, formerly of Dictator Batista's army, who was executed by a Castro firing squad, the principal picture showing the condemned man receiving last rites.

== Letters, Drama and Music Awards ==
- Fiction:
  - Advise and Consent by Allen Drury (Doubleday).
- Drama:
  - Fiorello!, book by Jerome Weidman and George Abbott, music by Jerry Bock, and lyrics by Sheldon Harnick (Random House).
- History:
  - In the Days of McKinley by Margaret Leech (Harper).
- Biography or Autobiography:
  - John Paul Jones by Samuel Eliot Morison (Little).
- Poetry:
  - Heart's Needle by W. D. Snodgrass (Knopf).
- Music:
  - Second String Quartet by Elliott Carter (Associated Music Publishers), first performed at the Juilliard School of Music, March 25, 1960.
- Special Citation:
  - The Defeat of the Spanish Armada by Garrett Mattingly (Houghton, Mifflin). It is a first class history and a literary work of high order.
