= Homophonic translation =

Text that sounds like a text in another language

Homophonic translation renders a text in one language into a near-homophonic text in another language, usually with no attempt to preserve the original meaning of the text. For example, the English "sat on a wall" /ˌsæt ɒn ə ˈwɔːl/ is rendered as French "s'étonne aux Halles" [setɔn o al] (literally "gets surprised at the Paris Market"). More generally, homophonic transformation renders a text into a near-homophonic text in the same or another language: e.g., "recognize speech" could become "wreck a nice beach".

Homophonic translation is generally used humorously, as bilingual punning (macaronic language). This requires the listener or reader to understand both the surface, nonsensical translated text, as well as the source text—the surface text then sounds like source text spoken in a foreign accent.

Homophonic translation may be used to render proper nouns in a foreign language. If an attempt is made to match meaning as well as sound, it is phono-semantic matching.

== Examples ==
Frayer Jerker (1956) is a homophonic translation of the French Frère Jacques. Other examples of homophonic translation include some works by Oulipo (1960–), Frédéric Dard, Luis van Rooten's English-French Mots D'Heures: Gousses, Rames (1967) (Mother Goose's Rhymes), Louis Zukofsky's Latin-English Catullus Fragmenta (1969), Ormonde de Kay's English-French N'Heures Souris Rames (1980) (Nursery Rhymes), John Hulme's German-English Morder Guss Reims: The Gustav Leberwurst Manuscript (Mother Goose's Rhymes), and David Melnick's Ancient Greek-English Men in Aida (1983) (Homer's Iliad).

An example of homophonic transformation in the same language is Howard L. Chace's "Ladle Rat Rotten Hut", written in "Anguish Languish" (English Language) and published in book form in 1956.

=== English-Latin ===
A British schoolboy example of Dog Latin:

Caesar adsum jam forte.
Brutus aderat.
Caesar sic in omnibus.
Brutus sic enat.

Caesar 'ad some jam for tea.
Brutus 'ad a rat.
Caesar sick in omnibus.
Brutus sick in 'at.

I, Caesar, am already here, as it happens.
Brutus was here also.
Caesar is so in all things.
Brutus so escapes.

Other names proposed for this genre include "allographic translation", "transphonation", or (in French) "traducson", but none of these is widely used.

=== English-French ===
Here is van Rooten's version of Humpty Dumpty:

Humpty Dumpty
Sat on a wall.
Humpty Dumpty
Had a great fall.
All the king's horses
And all the king's men
Couldn't put Humpty
Together again.

Un petit d'un petit
S'étonne aux Halles
Un petit d'un petit
Ah! degrés te fallent
Indolent qui ne sort cesse
Indolent qui ne se mène
Qu'importe un petit
Tout gai de Reguennes.

A child of a child
Is surprised at the Market
A child of a child
Oh, degrees you needed!
Lazy is he who never goes out
Lazy is he who is not led
Who cares about a little one
All happy with Reguennes

The individual words are all correct French. (*fallent is an obsolete form of the verb falloir; Reguennes is an invented proper name), and some passages follow standard syntax and are interpretable (though nonsensical), and the result is not proper French.

=== Hebrew-Italian ===
The Italian rabbi Leon of Modena composed at age 13 an octave by the name of "Kinah Sh'mor", meaningful in both Hebrew and Renaissance Judeo-Italian, as an elegy for his teacher Moses della Rocca. The first four verses are below.

Hebrew text	Hebrew transliteration	Translation	Judeo-Italian	Roman-type Italian	Translation
קִינָה שְׁמוֹר. אוֹי מֶה כְּפַּס אוֹצֵר בּוֹ.	Qinah shmor. Oy, meh kpas otzer bo,	Mark this lament! Ah, but the treasure of him has passed,	קִי נַאשֵׁי מור, אואִימֵי, קֵי ּפַאסוֹ אַצֵירבו!	Chi nasce muor, Oime, che pass'acerbo!	Whoever is born, dies. Ay, me! A bitter thing has come to pass!
כָּל טוֹב עֵילוֹם. כּוֹסִי אוֹר דִין אֶל צִילוֹ.	Kol tov ‘eilom. Kosi or din el tzilo.	All his divine good! The shadow of God's judgment falls on my cup of light.	קולטו וְאֵין לְ אומְ, קוסִי אורְדִינַה לְצְיֵילוֹ.	Colto vien l'huomo, cosi ordine il Cielo.	A man has been plucked, such is the decree of Heaven.
מֹשֶׁה, מוֹרִי, מֹשֶׁה יָקָר, דֶבֶר בּוֹ.	Mosheh mori, Mosheh, yaqar, dever bo.	Moses my teacher, Moses, how precious all was in him,	מוסֵי מורי, מוסֵי, גְיָיה קַאר דֵי וֵירבו,	Mose morì, Mose gia car de verbo,	Moses has died, Moses, so precious of speech,
שָׂם תּוּשִׁיָה אוֹן. יוֹם כִּיפּוּר הוּא זֶה לוֹ.	Sam tushiyah on. Yom Kippur hu’ zeh lo.	How much resourcefulness and strength were there! This is his Day of Atonement.	סַאנְטו סִיאַה אונְיִי אום, קון פורו זֵילוֹ!	Santo sia ogni huomo, con puro zelo!	Sainted be he of all men, pure was his zeal!

Ghil'ad Zuckermann's "Italo-Hebraic Homophonous Poem" is meaningful in both Italian and Hebrew, "although it has a surreal, evocative flavour, and modernist style".

Translation from Italian

Libido, Eva,
comes out of
Nicolette:
who gives the following:
...

Italian-Hebrew

Libido, Eva, ליבִּי דוֹאב,
esce da האש עֵדה.
Nicolet, אני קוֹלֵט
che tale dá: קטע לידה
...

Translation from Hebrew

My heart is languishing,
the fire is a witness.
I am absorbing
a stage of labour.
....

Here is another example of a sentence which has two completely different meanings if read in Latin or in Italian:

Sentence	Latin meaning	Italian meaning
I Vitelli dei Romani sono belli.	Go, Vitellius, at the Roman god's sound of war. (Ī, Vitellī, deī Rōmānī sonō bellī.)	The Romans' calves are beautiful. (I vitelli dei Romani sono belli.)

== Similar wordplay ==
An accidental homophonic transformation is known as a mondegreen. The term has also been applied to intentional homophonic translations of song lyrics, often combined with music videos, which have gained popularity on the internet. In Japanese, homophonic transformation for humor is known as soramimi.

== See also ==
- Gramogram – Group of letters pronounced as if a word
- Holorime, a form of rhyme where the entire line or phrase is repeated by a homophonic variant
- Mairzy Doats
- Mondegreen, the erroneous interpretation of language by homophony
- Mots d'Heures
- Phono-semantic matching (PSM), a borrowing in which a foreign word is matched with a phonetically and semantically similar pre-existent native word/root.
- Soramimi, homophonic reinterpretation for humor
- Translation
