= Loanword =

Word borrowed from a donor language and incorporated into a recipient language

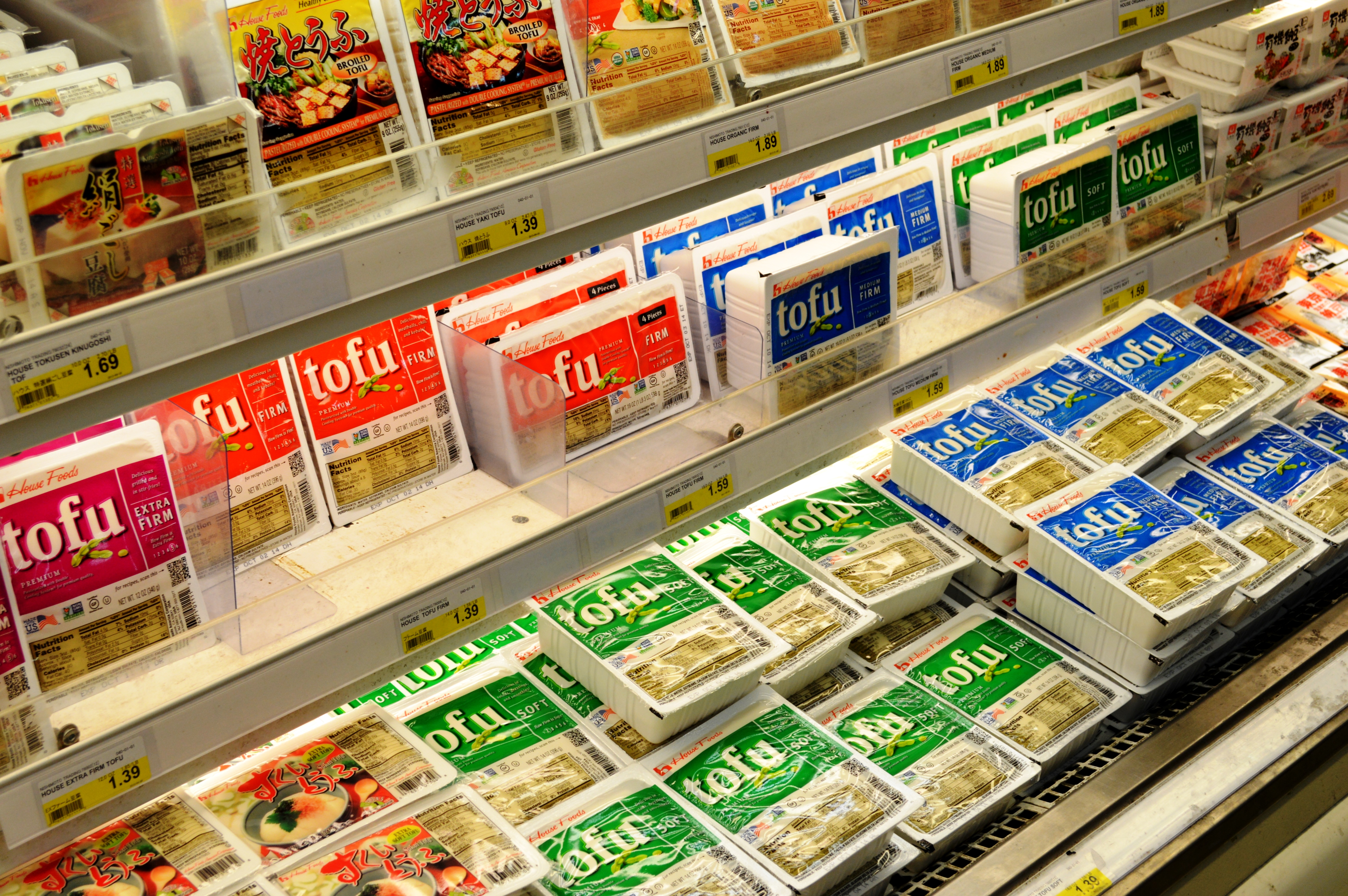
The English word tofu is a loanword from the Japanese word tōfu, which is itself a loanword from the Chinese word dòufu.

A loanword is a word at least partly assimilated from one language (the donor language) into another language (the recipient or target language), through the process of borrowing. Loan and borrow are here metaphorical terms that are well established in linguistics despite their acknowledged descriptive flaws: nothing is taken away (from the donor language) and there is no expectation of returning anything (from the recipient language).

Loanwords may be contrasted with calques, in which a word is borrowed into the recipient language by being directly translated from the donor language rather than being adopted in, or in an approximation of, its original form. They must also be distinguished from cognates, which are words in two or more related languages that are similar because they share an etymological origin in the ancestral language, rather than because one borrowed the word from the other.

== Examples and related terms ==
A loanword is distinguished from a calque (or loan translation), which is a word or phrase whose meaning or idiom is adopted from another language by word-for-word translation into existing words or word-forming roots of the recipient language. Loanwords, in contrast, are not translated.

Examples of loanwords in the English language include café (from French café, which means 'coffee'), bazaar (from Persian bāzār, which means 'market'), and kindergarten (from German Kindergarten, which literally means 'children's garden'). The word calque is a loanword, while the word loanword is a calque: calque comes from the French noun calque ("tracing; imitation; close copy"); while the word loanword and the phrase loan translation are translated from German nouns Lehnwort and Lehnübersetzung (German: [ˈleːnʔybɐˌzɛt͡sʊŋ]).

Loans of multi-word phrases, such as the English use of the French term déjà vu, are known as adoptions, adaptations, or lexical borrowings.

Although colloquial and informal register loanwords are typically spread by word-of-mouth, technical or academic loanwords tend to be first used in written language, often for scholarly, scientific, or literary purposes.

A Wanderwort is a word that has been borrowed across a wide range of languages remote from its original source; an example is the word tea, which originated in Hokkien but has been borrowed into languages all over the world. For a sufficiently old Wanderwort, it may become difficult or impossible to determine in what language it actually originated.

Most of the technical vocabulary of classical music (such as concerto, allegro, tempo, aria, opera, and soprano) is borrowed from Italian, and that of ballet from French. Much of the terminology of the sport of fencing also comes from French. Many loanwords come from prepared food, drink, fruits, vegetables, seafood and more from languages around the world. In particular, many come from French cuisine (crêpe, crème brûlée), Italian (pasta, linguine, pizza, espresso), and Chinese (dim sum, chow mein, wonton).

== Linguistic classification ==
Loanwords are adapted from one language to another in a variety of ways. The studies by Werner Betz (1971, 1901), Einar Haugen (1958, also 1956), and Uriel Weinreich (1963) are regarded as the classical theoretical works on loan influence. The basic theoretical statements all take Betz's nomenclature as their starting point. Duckworth enlarges Betz's scheme by the type "partial substitution" and supplements the system with English terms. A schematic illustration of these classifications is given below.

The phrase "foreign word" used in the image below is a mistranslation of the German Fremdwort, which refers to loanwords whose pronunciation, spelling, inflection or gender have not been adapted to the new language such that they no longer seem foreign. Such a separation of loanwords into two distinct categories is not used by linguists in English in talking about any language. Basing such a separation mainly on spelling is (or, in fact, was) not common except amongst German linguists, and only when talking about German and sometimes other languages that tend to adapt foreign spellings, which is rare in English unless the word has been widely used for a long time.

According to the linguist Suzanne Kemmer, the expression "foreign word" can be defined as follows in English: "[W]hen most speakers do not know the word and if they hear it think it is from another language, the word can be called a foreign word. There are many foreign words and phrases used in English such as bon vivant (French), mutatis mutandis (Latin), and Schadenfreude (German)." This is not how the term is used in this illustration:

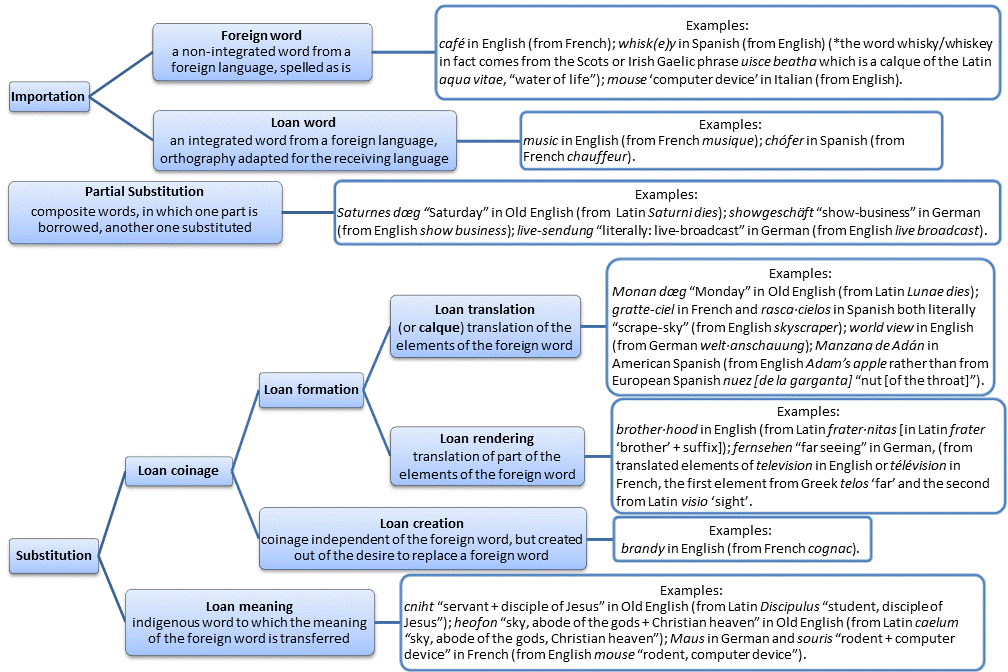

Origin	Variety	Description	Example
Importation	Foreign word	A new word is borrowed from a foreign language with no spelling alterations.	Café in English comes from the French café. Computer mouse in Italian comes from the English mouse. French word chauffeur is used in English.
Importation	Loaned word	An imported word borrowed from a foreign language with minor spelling alterations.	Cafe in English comes from the French café. Music in English from the French musique. Chofer in Spanish from the French word chauffeur. 乒乓 (pīngpāng) in Chinese from the English ping pong.
Partial substitution	Composite word	Part of a word is borrowed or substituted.	Live-sendung in German from the English live broadcast. A chaise longue ("long chair" in French) is often called a chaise lounge in British and American English.
Substitution	Calque (loaned translation)	A translation of the elements of a foreign word.	In Spanish escuela alta is from the English high school. In German, intelligence quotient calques as intelligenzquotient.
Substitution	Loaned rendering	A partial translation of the a foreign word.	
Substitution	Created word	A word coined with the desire to replace an imported foreign word for political or uniquely regional reasons.	The term alsatian replaced German Shepherd in England during World War II to distance the dog breed from Nazi Germany. The name was updated by the Kennel Club of the United Kingdom in 2010.
Substitution	Indigenous meaning	The meaning of an imported term is applied to an existing indigenous word.	The word mouse in English may refer to either a computer mouse or to a small long-tailed rodent. In French the word souris ("mouse", the rodent) was adopted to refer to the computer human interface device as well.

On the basis of an importation-substitution distinction, Haugen distinguishes three basic groups of borrowings: "(1) Loanwords show morphemic importation without substitution.... (2) Loanblends show morphemic substitution as well as importation.... (3) Loanshifts show morphemic substitution without importation". Haugen later refined his model in a review of Gneuss's book on Old English loan coinages, whose classification, in turn, is the one by Betz again.

Weinreich differentiates between two mechanisms of lexical interference, namely those initiated by simple words and those initiated by compound words and phrases. He defines simple words "from the point of view of the bilinguals who perform the transfer, rather than that of the descriptive linguist. Accordingly, the category 'simple' words also includes compounds that are transferred in unanalysed form". After this general classification, Weinreich then resorts to Betz's (1949) terminology.

== In English ==
The English language has borrowed many words from other cultures or languages. For examples, see lists of English words by country or language of origin and Anglicisation.

Some English loanwords remain relatively faithful to the original phonology even though a particular phoneme might not exist or have contrastive status in English. For example, the Hawaiian word ʻaʻā is used by geologists to specify lava that is thick, chunky, and rough. The Hawaiian spelling indicates the two glottal stops in the word, but the English pronunciation, /ˈɑː(ʔ)ɑː/, contains at most one. The English spelling usually removes the ʻokina and macron diacritics.

Most English affixes, such as un-, -ing, and -ly, were used in Old English. However, a few English affixes are borrowed. For example, the verbal suffix -ize (American English) or -ise (British English) comes from Greek -ιζειν (-izein) through Latin -izare.

Pronunciation often differs from the original language, occasionally dramatically, especially when dealing with place names. This often leads to divergence when many speakers anglicize pronunciations as other speakers try to maintain the way the name would sound in the original language, as in the pronunciation of Louisville.

== Languages other than English ==
=== Transmission in the Ottoman Empire ===
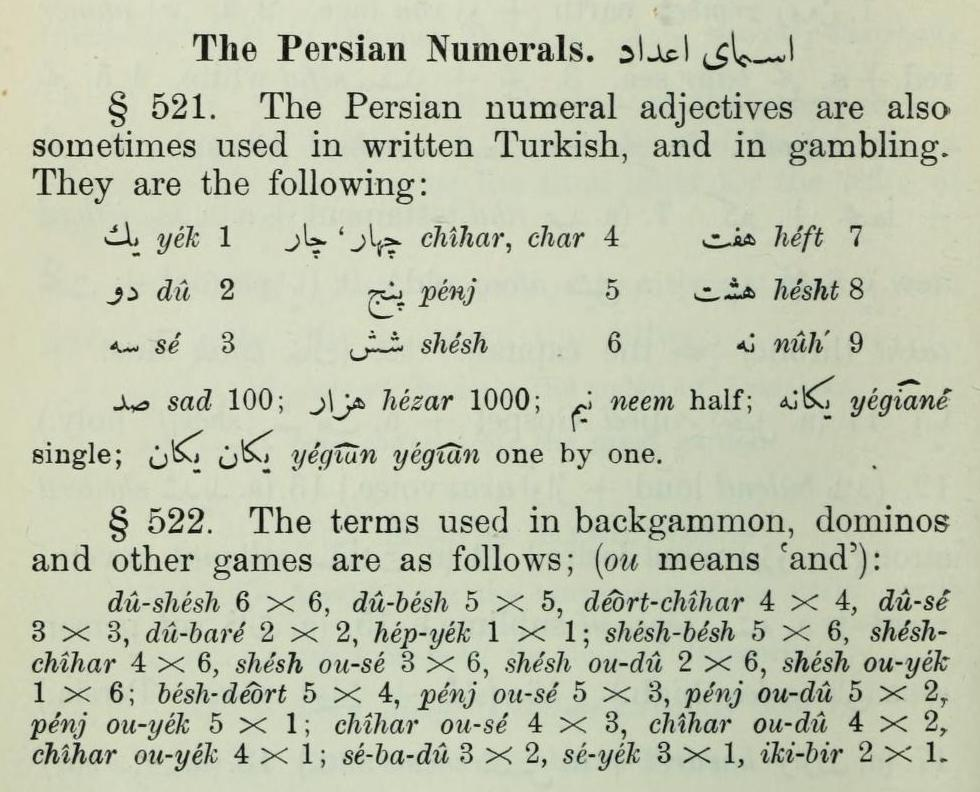
Backgammon and Dominos numbers in Ottoman Turkish, 1907 (see Tables game#Languages)

During more than 600 years of the Ottoman Empire, the literary and administrative language of the empire was Turkish, with many Persian and Arabic loanwords, called Ottoman Turkish, considerably differing from the everyday spoken Turkish of the time. Many such words were adopted by other languages of the empire, such as Albanian, Bosnian, Bulgarian, Croatian, Greek, Hungarian, Ladino, Macedonian, Montenegrin and Serbian. After the empire fell after World War I and the Republic of Turkey was founded, the Turkish language underwent an extensive language reform led by the newly founded Turkish Language Association, during which many adopted words were replaced with new formations derived from Turkic roots. That was part of the ongoing cultural reform of the time, in turn a part in the broader framework of Atatürk's Reforms, which also included the introduction of the new Turkish alphabet.

Turkish also has taken many words from French, such as pantolon for trousers (from French pantalon) and komik for funny (from French comique), most of them pronounced very similarly.

Word usage in modern Turkey has acquired a political tinge: right-wing publications tend to use more Arabic-originated words, left-wing publications use more words adopted from Indo-European languages such as Persian and French, while centrist publications use more native Turkish root words.

=== Dutch words in Indonesian ===
Almost 350 years of Dutch presence in what is now Indonesia have left significant linguistic traces. Though very few Indonesians have a fluent knowledge of Dutch, the Indonesian language inherited many words from Dutch, both in words for everyday life (e.g., buncis from Dutch boontjes for (green) beans) and as well in administrative, scientific or technological terminology (e.g., kantor from Dutch kantoor for office). The Professor of Indonesian Literature at Leiden University, and of Comparative Literature at UCR, argues that roughly 20% of Indonesian words can be traced back to Dutch words.

=== Dutch words in Russian ===
In the late 17th century, the Dutch Republic had a leading position in shipbuilding. Czar Peter the Great, eager to improve his navy, studied shipbuilding in Zaandam and Amsterdam. Many Dutch naval terms have been incorporated in the Russian vocabulary, such as бра́мсель (brámsel) from Dutch bramzeil for the topgallant sail, домкра́т (domkrát) from Dutch dommekracht for jack, and матро́с (matrós) from Dutch matroos for sailor.

=== Romance languages ===
A large percentage of the lexicon of Romance languages, themselves descended from Vulgar Latin, consists of loanwords (later learned or scholarly borrowings) from Latin. These words can be distinguished by lack of typical sound changes and other transformations found in descended words, or by meanings taken directly from Classical or Ecclesiastical Latin that did not evolve or change over time as expected; in addition, there are also semi-learned terms which were adapted partially to the Romance language's character. Latin borrowings can be known by several names in Romance languages: in French, for example, they are usually referred to as mots savants, in Spanish as cultismos, and in Italian as latinismi.

Latin is usually the most common source of loanwords in these languages, such as in Italian, Spanish, French, Portuguese, etc., and in some cases the total number of loans may even outnumber inherited terms (although the learned borrowings are less often used in common speech, with the most common vocabulary being of inherited, orally transmitted origin from Vulgar Latin). This has led to many cases of etymological doublets in these languages.

For most Romance languages, these loans were initiated by scholars, clergy, or other learned people and occurred in medieval times, peaking in the late Middle Ages and early Renaissance era; in Italian, the 14th century had the highest number of loans. In the case of Romanian, the language underwent a "re-Latinization" process later than the others (see Romanian lexis, Romanian language § French, Italian, and English loanwords), in the 18th and 19th centuries, partially using French and Italian words (many of these themselves being earlier borrowings from Latin) as intermediaries, in an effort to modernize the language, often adding concepts that did not exist until then, or replacing words of other origins. These common borrowings and features also essentially serve to raise mutual intelligibility of the Romance languages, particularly in academic/scholarly, literary, technical, and scientific domains. Many of these same words are also found in English (through its numerous borrowings from Latin and French) and other European languages.

In addition to Latin loanwords, many words of Ancient Greek origin were also borrowed into Romance languages, often in part through scholarly Latin intermediates, and these also often pertained to academic, scientific, literary, and technical topics. Furthermore, to a lesser extent, Romance languages borrowed from a variety of other languages; in particular, English has become an important source in more recent times. The study of the origin of these words and their function and context within the language can illuminate some important aspects and characteristics of the language, and it can reveal insights on the phenomenon of lexical borrowing in linguistics as a method of enriching a language.

== Cultural aspects ==
According to Hans Henrich Hock and Brian Joseph, "languages and dialects... do not exist in a vacuum": there is always linguistic contact between groups. The contact influences what loanwords are integrated into the lexicon and which certain words are chosen over others.

== Leaps in meaning ==
In some cases, the original meaning shifts considerably through unexpected logical leaps, creating false friends. The English word Viking became Japanese バイキング (baikingu), meaning "buffet", because the first restaurant in Japan to offer buffet-style meals, inspired by the Nordic smörgåsbord, was opened in 1958 by the Imperial Hotel under the name "Viking". The German word Kachel, meaning "tile", became the Dutch word kachel meaning "stove", as a shortening of kacheloven, from German Kachelofen, a cocklestove. The Indonesian word manset primarily means "spandex clothing", "inner bolero", or "detachable sleeve", while its French etymon manchette means "cuff".

== See also ==
- Bilingual pun
- Hybrid word
- Inkhorn term
- Language contact
- Linguistic purism
- Neologism
- Phono-semantic matching
- Reborrowing
- Semantic loan

== Sources ==
- Best, Karl-Heinz, Kelih, Emmerich (eds.) (2014): Entlehnungen und Fremdwörter: Quantitative Aspekte. Lüdenscheid: RAM-Verlag.
- Betz, Werner (1949). Deutsch und Lateinisch: Die Lehnbildungen der althochdeutschen Benediktinerregel. Bonn: Bouvier.
- Betz, Werner (1959): "Lehnwörter und Lehnprägungen im Vor- und Frühdeutschen". In: Maurer, Friedrich / Stroh, Friedrich (eds.): Deutsche Wortgeschichte. 2nd ed. Berlin: Schmidt, vol. 1, 127–147.
- Bloom, Dan (2010): "What's That Pho?". French Loan Words in Vietnam Today; Taipei Times, [ SOCIETY ] What's that 'pho'? - Taipei Times
- Cannon, Garland (1999): "Problems in studying loans", Proceedings of the annual meeting of the Berkeley Linguistics Society 25, 326–336.
- Duckworth, David (1977). "Zur terminologischen und systematischen Grundlage der Forschung auf dem Gebiet der englisch-deutschen Interferenz: Kritische Übersicht und neuer Vorschlag".". In Kolb, Herbert; Lauffer, Hartmut (eds.). Sprachliche Interferenz: Festschrift für Werner Betz zum 65. Geburtstag. Tübingen: Niemeyer. pp. 36–56.
- Gneuss, Helmut (1955). Lehnbildungen und Lehnbedeutungen im Altenglischen. Berlin: Schmidt.
- Grzega, Joachim (2003): "Borrowing as a Word-Finding Process in Cognitive Historical Onomasiology", Onomasiology Online 4, 22–42.
- Grzega, Joachim (2004): Bezeichnungswandel: Wie, Warum, Wozu? Heidelberg: Winter.
- Haugen, Einar (1950). "The analysis of linguistic borrowing". Language. 26 (2): 210–231. doi:10.2307/410058.
- Haugen, Einar (1956). "Review of Lehnbildungen und Lehnbedeutungen im Altenglischen, by H. Gneuss". Language. 32 (4): 761–766. doi:10.2307/411105.
- Hitchings, Henry (2008), The Secret Life of Words: How English Became English, London: John Murray, ISBN 978-0-7195-6454-3.
- Kersley, Leo; Sinclair, Janet (1979), A Dictionary of Ballet Terms, Da Capo Press, ISBN 978-0-306-80094-8.
- Koch, Peter (2002): "Lexical Typology from a Cognitive and Linguistic Point of View". In: Cruse, D. Alan et al. (eds.): Lexicology: An International on the Nature and Structure of Words and Vocabularies/Lexikologie: Ein internationales Handbuch zur Natur und Struktur von Wörtern und Wortschätzen. Berlin/New York: Walter de Gruyter, 1142–1178.
- Oksaar, Els (1996): "The history of contact linguistics as a discipline". In: Goebl, Hans et al. (eds.): Kontaktlinguistik/contact linguistics/linguistique de contact: ein internationales Handbuch zeitgenössischer Forschung/an international handbook of contemporary research/manuel international des recherches contemporaines. Berlin/New York: Walter de Gruyter, 1–12.
- Shanet, Howard (1956), Learn to Read Music, New York: Simon & Schuster, ISBN 978-0-671-21027-4.
- Stanforth, Anthony W. (2002): "Effects of language contact on the vocabulary: an overview". In: Cruse, D. Alan et al. (eds.) (2002): Lexikologie: ein internationales Handbuch zur Natur und Struktur von Wörtern und Wortschätzen/Lexicology: an international handbook on the nature and structure of words and vocabularies. Berlin/New York: Walter de Gruyter, p. 805–813.
- Zuckermann, Ghil'ad (2003), Language Contact and Lexical Enrichment in Israeli Hebrew, Houndmills: Palgrave Macmillan, (ISBN 978-1-4039-3869-5)
