= Howard L. Chace =

American linguist

- Born: Howard Lambert Chace; June 4, 1897; Cincinnati, Ohio
- Died: January 9, 1982 (aged 84)
- Education: Miami University (A.B., 1931; M.A., 1935)
- Occupations: author, college professor, humorist, organist
- Employer: Miami University
- Known for: Anguish Languish

Howard Lambert Chace (June 4, 1897 – January 9, 1982) was an American linguist. He was a professor of Romance languages at Miami University in Oxford, Ohio, and is best known for writing poems and stories employing homophonic transformation.

== Biography ==
Chace's prolonged undergraduate studies at Miami University (in Oxford, Ohio) lasted from 1915 until graduating in 1931 with his A.B. degree. During those years he was interested in music and recording on old wax cylinders, and for a time took leave from school to serve in the Merchant Marines. While later working as a French instructor at Miami University, he completed his master's degree in just four years, writing his thesis on 17th- and 18th-century French novels. He had also done some studying at the University of Cincinnati and McGill University, and he was a member of Delta Kappa Epsilon and Phi Beta Kappa. He stayed on as a professor at Miami University for the duration of his career, from 1938 to 1965.

Chace played during the showing of silent movies as a pianist and organist, beginning in his college years.

He married Martha Burdsall ("Marty") in 1928, and they had two daughters, Millicent and Elizabeth.

== Writings ==
=== Little Red Riding Hood ===
In 1940, he wrote Ladle Rat Rotten Hut to demonstrate that the intonation of spoken English is almost as important to the meaning as the words themselves. It was first published in Gene Sherman's column in the Los Angeles Times in 1953 and in the first issue of Sports Illustrated in 1954.

In Ladle Rat Rotten Hut the classic Little Red Riding Hood tale is told, purposely replacing its usual words with similar-sounding words that are strung together in what might at first appear to a reader as a nonsensical sequence. While they are actual words, they are in a meaningless sequence, except when heard and interpreted by someone familiar with the story. Each phrase, taken as a whole and, especially, heard aloud, so closely resembles phrases most speakers of English recognize as telling a well-known story, that hearers may take a moment to realize that every word is simply and purposely wrong. The tale begins "Wants pawn term dare worsted ladle gull," which is easily deciphered, when spoken with appropriate intonation, to mean "Once upon a time there was a little girl." The word replacement continues throughout the story.

In some cases a single word replaces several (e.g., "evanescent" is employed to sound like "if it isn't"), and sometimes several are combined to make represent word ("on forger nut" can be heard as "unfortunate"). Every replacement word can be found in typical collegiate dictionaries, with the exception of "icer" which is in Merriam-Webster's Unabridged.

=== Anguish Languish ===
"Ladle Rat Rotten Hut" was later published in his book Anguish Languish (1956) after it was read on television by Arthur Godfrey. The book included Chace's various other works of homophonic transformation, including story of Guilty Look Enter Tree Beers (Goldilocks and the Three Bears). Ogden Nash, after reading the book, mailed Chace his own Anguish Languish version of a popular song. Chace also received letters from his readers containing Anguish Languish adaptations of familiar works.

== Bibliography ==
- Chace, H. L. (1931). Notes sur le realisme (Honor's Thesis (Manuscript)). Miami University. OCLC 34627740.
- Chace, Howard L. (1935). An outline of a course of lectures on the French novel from 1607 to 1761 (Master's Thesis (Manuscript)). Miami University. OCLC 34612046.
- Chace, Howard L. (1956). Anguish Languish [English Language]. Englewood Cliffs, N.J.: Prentice-Hall. OCLC 2539398.
- Chace, Howard L. (1956). Ladle Rat Rotten Hut. Pittsburgh, Pennsylvania: Oldstyle Press. OCLC 49208995.
- "Slipping Booty". Sports Illustrated. Vol. 11, no. 7. Time, Inc. August 17, 1959. p. 26.
