= Mots d'Heures: Gousses, Rames: The d'Antin Manuscript =

1967 book by Luis d'Antin van Rooten

- Author: Luis van Rooten
- Publisher: Grossman Publishers
- Publication date: 1967
- English publication date: 1967
- Media type: Book
- Pages: 76
- OCLC: 1208360
- LC Class: 67-21230

Mots d'Heures: Gousses, Rames: The d'Antin Manuscript (Mother Goose Rhymes), published in 1967 by Luis d'Antin van Rooten, is purportedly a collection of poems written in French with learned glosses. In fact, they are English-language nursery rhymes written homophonically as a nonsensical French text (with pseudo-scholarly explanatory footnotes); that is, as an English-to-French homophonic translation. The result is not merely the English nursery rhyme but that nursery rhyme as it would sound if spoken in English by someone with a strong French accent. Even the manuscript's title, when spoken aloud, sounds like "Mother Goose Rhymes" with a strong French accent; it literally means "Words of Hours: Pods, Paddles."

Here is van Rooten's version of Humpty Dumpty:

Humpty Dumpty Sat on a wall. Humpty Dumpty Had a great fall. And all the king's horses And all the king's men Couldn't put Humpty Dumpty Together again.	Un petit d'un petit S'étonne aux Halles Un petit d'un petit Ah! degrés te fallent Indolent qui ne sort cesse Indolent qui ne se mène Qu'importe un petit d'un petit Tout Gai de Reguennes.	A child of a child Is surprised at the Market A child of a child Oh, degrees you needed! Lazy is he who never goes out Lazy is he who is not led Who cares about a child of a child Like Guy of Reguennes. (Note: Reguennes (French: [ʁəɡɛn]) is a contrived proper name.)

== Nursery rhymes ==
The original English nursery rhymes that correspond to the numbered poems in Mots d'Heures: Gousses, Rames are as follows:

1. Humpty Dumpty
2. Old King Cole
3. Hey Diddle Diddle
4. Old Mother Hubbard
5. There Was a Little Man and He Had a Little Gun
6. Hickory Dickory Dock
7. Jack Sprat
8. Peter Peter Pumpkin Eater
9. There Was a Crooked Man
10. Little Miss Muffet
11. Jack and Jill
12. There Was a Little Girl She Had a Little Curl
13. Little Jack Horner
14. Ride a Cockhorse to Banbury Cross
15. Tinker Tailor Soldier Sailor
16. Rain Rain Go Away
17. Pat-a-cake Pat-a-cake Baker's Man
18. Mistress Mary Quite Contrary
19. Roses Are Red Violets Are Blue
20. Tom Tom the Piper's Son
21. Mary Had a Little Lamb
22. Cross Patch Draw the Latch
23. See Saw Margery Daw
24. The Queen of Hearts She Made Some Tarts
25. One Two Buckle My Shoe
26. There Was an Old Woman Who Lived in a Shoe
27. Ladybird Ladybird Fly Away Home
28. Monday's Child
29. Lucy Locket
30. Curly Locks
31. Here Is the Church, Here Is the Steeple
32. Simple Simon
33. I Do Not Like Thee Doctor Fell
34. Pussy Cat Pussy Cat
35. Little Bo Peep
36. Baa Baa Black Sheep
37. Polly Put the Kettle On
38. Lock the Dairy Door
39. This Little Pig Went to Market
40. Now I Lay Me Down to Sleep

== Secondary use ==
Ten of the Mots d'Heures: Gousses, Rames have been set to music by Lawrence Whiffin.

== Similar works ==
An earlier example of homophonic translation (in this case French-to-English) is "Frayer Jerker" (Frère Jacques) in Anguish Languish (1956).

A later book in the English-to-French genre is N'Heures Souris Rames (Nursery Rhymes), published in 1980 by Ormonde de Kay. It contains some forty nursery rhymes, among which are Coucou doux de Ledoux (Cock-A-Doodle-Doo), Signe, garçon. Neuf Sikhs se pansent (Sing a Song of Sixpence) and Hâte, carrosse bonzes (Hot Cross Buns).

A similar work in German-English is Mörder Guss Reims: The Gustav Leberwurst Manuscript by John Hulme (1st Edition 1981; various publishers listed; ISBN 0517545594, ISBN 978-0517545591 and others). The dust jacket, layout and typography are similar in style and appearance to the original Mots d'Heures. The book contains a different selection of nursery rhymes.

=== Raymond Roussel ===
Raymond Roussel, was a French author, whose writings are considered to have influenced the Surrealists. Roussel, in writing his novel Locus Solus and elsewhere, used a technique that involved putting together in different contexts words that sound similar. The result produces unexpected and even irrational new meanings, and is a bit similar to van Rooten’s technique when he wrote Mots d'Heures: Gousses, Rames. The two books differ in that Roussel’s technique doesn’t involve bilingualism or humor, at least not in the same way. According to Marcel Jean, the surrealist artist, Marcel Duchamp, discovered Mots D'Heures: Gousses, Rames, and shared it with others.

== Publication history ==
- 1967, USA, Viking Adult, ISBN 0-670-49064-4, hardcover, 40 pp.
- 1967, UK, Grossman, ISBN 1-299-26218-X, 43 pp.
- 1968, UK, Angus & Robertson, ISBN 0-207-94991-3, May 1968, hardcover, 80 pp.
- 1977, UK, Angus & Robertson, ISBN 0-207-95799-1, De Luxe Ed edition, November 17, 1977, 40 pp.
- 1980, US, Penguin, ISBN 978-0-14-005730-0, November 20, 1980, paperback, 80 pp.
- 2009, UK, Blue Door, ISBN 978-0-00-732469-9, 29 October 2009, hardcover, 48 pp.

== See also ==
- N'Heures Souris Rames
- Homophonic translation
- Mondegreen
- Phono-semantic matching
