= Gene Sherman (reporter) =

American journalist

- Born: Eugene Franklin Sherman; January 27, 1915; Oak Park, Illinois, US
- Died: March 5, 1969 (aged 54); Heathrow Airport, London
- Occupations: Newspaper reporter and columnist
- Employer: Los Angeles Times
- Awards: Pulitzer Prize for Public Service (named contributor)

Eugene Franklin Sherman (January 27, 1915 – March 5, 1969) was an American journalist whose work contributed to the Los Angeles Times winning the 1960 Pulitzer Prize for Public Service. Sherman started his 30 years on staff as a cub reporter covering nearly all the regular news beats from police and sheriff to municipal and Superior Courts. He then worked as a rewrite man, a frontline general assignment reporter, leading feature story writer, war correspondent, in-depth investigative reporter and a foreign correspondent. He became a daily general interest writer of his page-2 column Cityside for seven years and a roving national and international assignment reporter. In 1964 he opened the London bureau as part of the Los Angeles Times bid to widen its editorial base into a national newspaper, rivaling the influence and impact of The Washington Post and The New York Times.
