= Luis van Rooten =

American actor, author, artist, designer and architect (1906–1973)

Luis d'Antin van Rooten
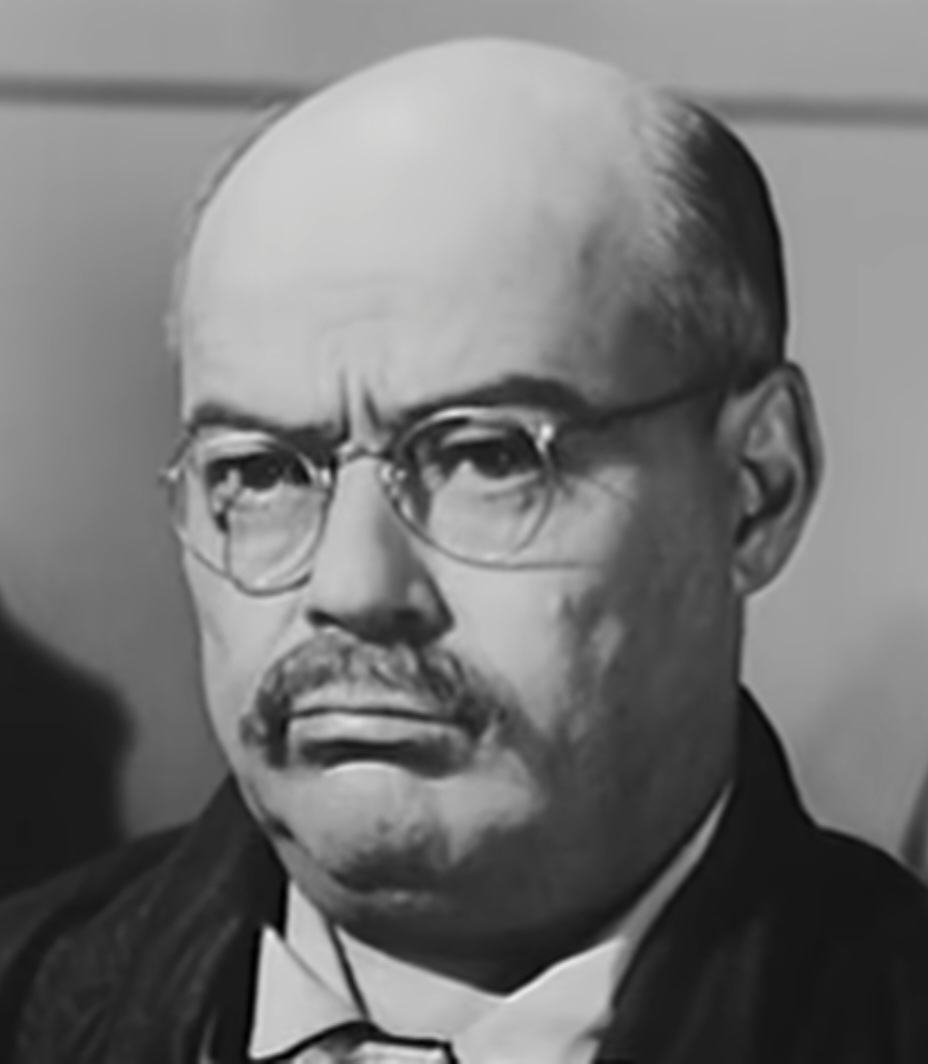
- Van Rooten in an episode of One Step Beyond (1960)
- Born: Luis d'Antin van Rooten; November 29, 1906; Mexico City, Mexico
- Died: June 17, 1973 (aged 66); Chatham, Massachusetts, U.S.
- Education: University of Pennsylvania
- Occupations: Actor, author, architect, painter, translator
- Years active: 1938–1968
- Spouse: Catherine Gaylord Kelly
- Children: 2

Luis d'Antin van Rooten (November 29, 1906 – June 17, 1973) was an American actor, author, artist, designer and architect. He was sometimes credited as Louis Van Rooten.

== Early life ==
Van Rooten was born on November 29, 1906 in Mexico City, Mexico. His father worked as a translator and clerk at the American Embassy. Some sources say his father was killed during the Mexican Revolution.

In 1914, when he was 8, Van Rooten emigrated to the United States with his Belgian grandmother. Because he had no papers, his grandmother claimed van Rooten was her son, which resulted in the elongation of his name to Luis Ricardo Carlos Fernand d’Antin y Zuloaga van Rooten.

== Education and early career ==
Van Rooten attended a boarding school in Pennsylvania and earned his BA in architecture at the University of Pennsylvania in 1927. He enjoyed a successful career as an architect in Cleveland, Ohio before his love for acting led to a career as one of radio and television's most prolific character actors and narrators.

== Film work ==
His facility with languages made van Rooten an in-demand military radio announcer during World War II. He conducted a variety of broadcasts in Italian, Spanish, and French. This led to film work, often in roles requiring an accent or skill with dialects.

Known for his villainous roles, he played Nazi ringleader Heinrich Himmler in The Hitler Gang (1944) and Operation Eichmann (1961). He played supporting roles with a number of film stars, including Alan Ladd in Two Years Before the Mast (1946) and Beyond Glory (1948), Charles Laughton in The Big Clock (1948), Veronica Lake in Saigon (1948), Edward G. Robinson in Night Has a Thousand Eyes (1948), and Kirk Douglas in Detective Story (1951). He provided the voices for both the King and the Grand Duke in Walt Disney's animated film Cinderella (1950), as well as the Heavenly Express conductor in the Tom and Jerry cartoon, Heavenly Puss (1949).

Van Rooten's obituary in The New York Times noted that he worked on as many as 50 shows a month because of his ability to do dialects and criminals.

== Radio, Broadway and television ==
Van Rooten found steady work doing the narration in addition to acting in films, live television and radio dramas. One of his first film narration jobs was Industrial Ohio, a 1938 film in the SOHIO Let's Explore Ohio series.

He acted in The Mysterious Traveler and, during the New York run of I Love a Mystery, played "The Maestro" in the 1949 story "Bury Your Dead, Arizona" and ranch foreman Jasper in the 1950 story "The Battle of the Century." He portrayed the evil Roxor in the late 1940s revival of the radio serial Chandu the Magician and portrayed the title character's sidekick, Denny, in Bulldog Drummond. Van Rooten played Emilio in the radio soap opera Valiant Lady. In "Joey Was Different," the August 22, 1949 edition of Radio City Playhouse, he played sixteen different characters in addition to writing the script.

Van Rooten performed on Broadway in Eugene O'Neill's A Touch of the Poet (1958) and John Osborne's Luther (1963). He worked on television, playing the fictional French detective Maigret in a 1952 episode of the anthology series Suspense. In 1958, he guest-starred as murderer Samuel D. Carlin in the Perry Mason episode, "The Case of the One-Eyed Witness". Van Rooten also appeared in an uncredited role on The Honeymooners as Mr. Johnson, the landlord.

== Books ==
He is best known for his character work in films, but van Rooten was also a skilled artist and designer and the author of several sophisticated books of humor. These include Van Rooten's Book of Improbable Saints, The Floriculturist's Vade Mecum of Exotic and Recondite Plants, Shrubs and Grasses, and One Malignant Parasite and Mots d'Heures: Gousses, Rames: The d'Antin Manuscript.

=== Mots D'Heures: Gousses, Rames ===
Van Rooten is well known for his book Mots d'Heures: Gousses, Rames: The d'Antin Manuscript (1967), a collection of poems, ostensibly written by an obscure and unsung Frenchman (with translations and commentary). Van Rooten used French words and phrases which, when spoken aloud with a French accent, produce English Mother Goose rhymes, a work of homophonic translation. The following example, when spoken aloud, sounds like the opening lines to "Humpty Dumpty":

Un petit d'un petit
S'étonne aux Halles
Un petit d'un petit
Ah! Degrés te fallent

The above lines translated into English:

Child of a child
Astonished by Les Halles
Child of a child
Ah, you lack degrees

== Death ==
Van Rooten died June 17, 1973, in Chatham, Massachusetts in the retirement home he had designed himself.

== Filmography ==
Year	Title	Role	Notes
1938	Industrial Ohio #1	Narrator	A copy of the film is online in the Hagley Library Cinécraft Productions collection
1944	The Hitler Gang	Heinrich Himmler	
1946	Two Years Before the Mast	2nd Mate Foster	
1948	To the Ends of the Earth	Commissioner Alberto Berado	
1948	The Big Clock	Edwin Orlin	
1948	Saigon	Simon	
1948	To the Victor	Geran	
1948	Beyond Glory	Dr. White	
1948	Night Has a Thousand Eyes	Mr. Myers	
1948	The Gentleman from Nowhere	F.B. Barton	
1949	Boston Blackie's Chinese Venture	Bill Craddock	
1949	Heavenly Puss	Gatekeeper Cooper	Voice
1949	City Across the River	Joe Cusack	
1949	Champion	Harris	
1949	The Secret of St. Ives	Clausel	
1950	Cinderella	King / Grand Duke	Voices
1951	Detective Story	Joe Feinson	
1951	My Favorite Spy	Rudolf Hoenig	
1952	Lydia Bailey	General Charles LeClerc	
1953	The Great Adventure	Narrator (Anders as an adult)	(U.S. version), Voice
1955	The Sea Chase	Matz	
1955	Studio One	Lutz	Season 8 Episode 9: "The Judge and His Hangman"
1957	The Unholy Wife	Ezra Benton	
1958	Alfred Hitchcock Presents	Leon	Season 3 Episode 22: "The Return of the Hero"
1958	Fräulein	Fritz Graubach	
1958	Curse of the Faceless Man	Dr. Carlo Fiorillo	
1961	Operation Eichmann	Heinrich Himmler	
1968	What's So Bad About Feeling Good?	Dr. Fowler	Uncredited, (final film role)
