= Eggcorn =

Altered phrase that is still plausible

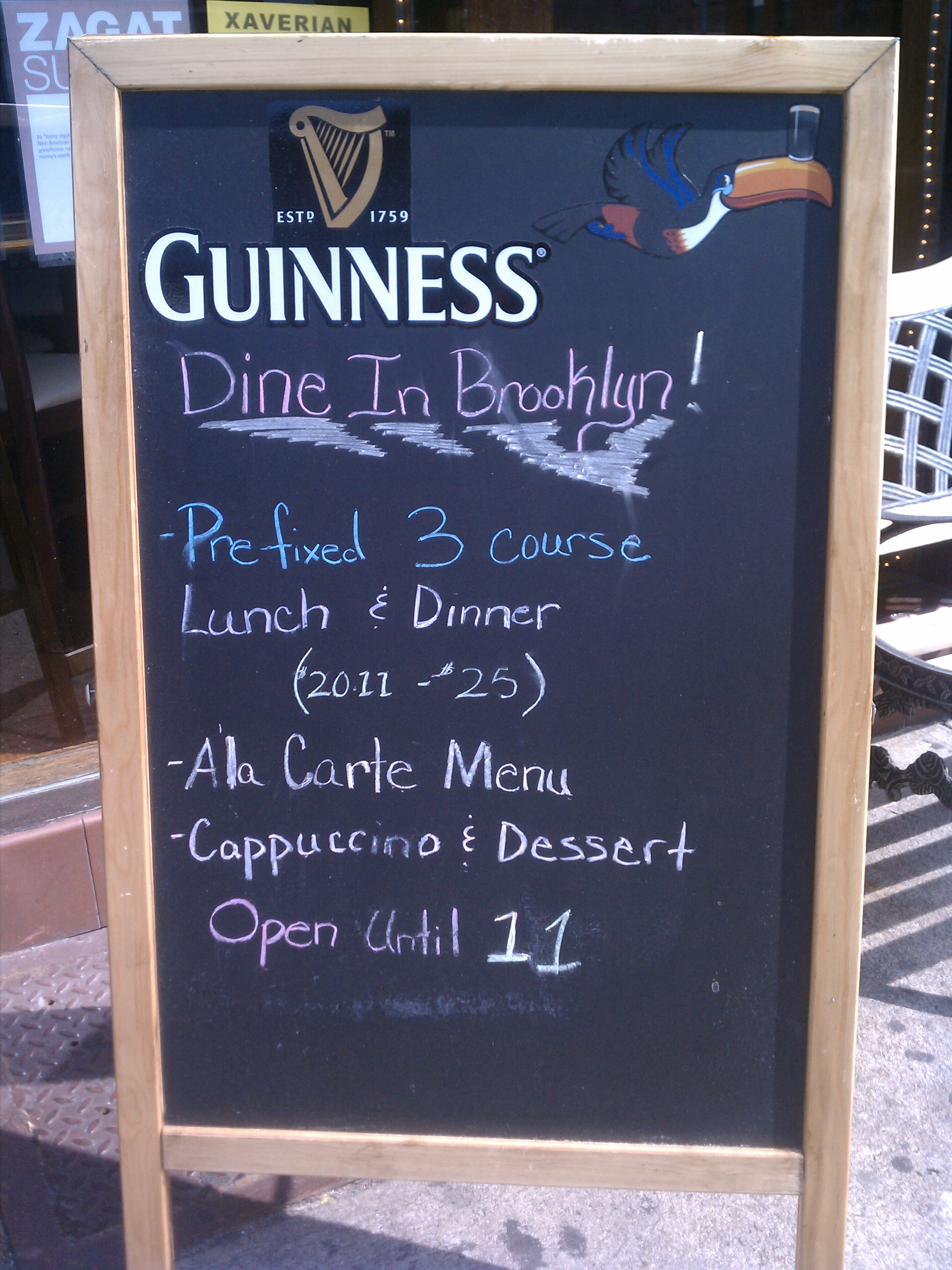
Cafe chalkboard advertising a "pre fixed" menu, an eggcorn of the French prix fixe (fixed price)

An eggcorn is the alteration of a word or phrase through the mishearing or reinterpretation of one or more of its elements, creating a new phrase that is plausible when used in the same context.

The term (originally egg corn) was coined in September 2003 by Geoffrey Pullum in response to an article by Mark Liberman on the website Language Log. The article discussed the case of a woman who had used the phrase egg corn for acorn, and noted that this type of substitution lacked a name. Pullum suggested using egg corn as a label.

== Language change ==
Eggcorns often arise when people attempt to use analogy and logic to make sense of an expression – often a stock one – that includes a term that is not meaningful to them by swapping in a similar-sounding word that is more familiar.

For example, the stock expression "in one fell swoop" might be replaced by "in one foul swoop", the infrequently used adjective fell (meaning fierce, cruel or terrible) being replaced with the more common word foul in order to convey the meaning of the phrase as the speaker understands it. Another common example is people misinterpreting "Alzheimer's disease" as "old timer's disease", the mishearing being plausibly descriptive of a condition which generally affects older people and includes symptoms of forgetfulness and eccentricity.

Eggcorns are of interest to linguists as they not only afford a view into language change as it occurs, but can also shed light on how and why the change takes place.

== Examples ==
- "baited breath" for "bated breath"
- "beckon call" for "beck and call"
- "damp squid" for "damp squib"
- "deep seeded" for "deep seated"
- "ex-patriot" for "expatriate"
- "the feeble position" for "the fetal position"
- "for all intensive purposes" for "for all intents and purposes"
- "free reign" for "free rein"
- "in one foul swoop" for "in one fell swoop"
- "jackarse" or "jack-arse" for "jackass"
- "jar-dropping" for "jaw-dropping"
- "just desserts" for "just deserts"
- "old-timers' disease" for "Alzheimer's disease"
- "old wise tale" for "old wives' tale"
- "on the spurt of the moment" for "on the spur of the moment"
- "parting shot" for "Parthian shot"
- "peaked my interest" for "piqued my interest"
- "per say" for per se
- "preying mantis" for "praying mantis"
- "real trooper" for "real trouper"
- "ripe with..." for "rife with..."
- "scandally clad" for "scantily clad"
- "shoe-in" for "shoo-in"
- "sneak peak" for "sneak peek"
- "to the manor born" for "to the manner born"
- "wet your appetite" for "whet your appetite"

== Similar phenomena ==
Eggcorns are similar to but distinct from several other linguistic expressions:

- Where a folk etymology is a change in the form of a word caused by widespread misunderstanding of the word's etymology, an eggcorn may be limited to one person rather than being used generally within a speech community.
- A malapropism generally derives its effect from a comic misunderstanding of the user, often creating a nonsensical phrase; an eggcorn on the other hand is a substitution that exhibits creativity or logic.
- A mondegreen is a misinterpretation of a word or phrase, often within the lyrics of a specific song or other type of performance, and need not make sense within that context. An eggcorn must still retain something of the original meaning, as the speaker understands it, and may be a replacement for a poorly understood phrase rather than a mishearing.
- In a pun, the speaker or writer intentionally creates a humorous effect, whereas an eggcorn may be used or created by someone who is unaware that the expression is non-standard.

Where the spoken form of an eggcorn sounds the same as the original, it becomes a type of homophone.
