= Soramimi =

Humorous homophonic reinterpretation of words

Soramimi (空耳, "thought to have heard", or "pretending to have not heard") is a Japanese word that in the context of contemporary Japanese internet meme culture and its related slang is commonly used to refer to humorous homophonic reinterpretation, deliberately interpreting words as other similar-sounding words for comedy (similar to a mondegreen, but done deliberately).

The word is more commonly used for its original, literal meaning.

The slang usage is derived from the long-running "Soramimi Hour" segment on Japanese comedian Tamori's TV program Tamori Club. Tamori is one of the "big three" television comedians in Japan and is very influential. The segment, in which he and his co-host watch mini-skits based on submissions from fans, began in 1992.

Soramimi applies to dialogue as well as song lyrics. For example, in the 2004 film Downfall, when Adolf Hitler says "und betrogen worden", it is misrepresented as "oppai purun purun" ("titty boing boing").

Soramimi humor was a staple in Japanese message board Flash animation culture from the late 1990s to the mid-2000s. It later became very popular on Niconico, a Japanese video-sharing website in which comments are overlaid directly onto the video, synced to specific playback times, allowing for soramimi subtitles to be easily added to any video. One such example is the Moldovan band O-Zone's song "Dragostea Din Tei". The refrain of the original song (in Romanian) is:

Vrei să pleci dar nu mă, nu mă iei...
("You want to leave but you don't want, don't want to take me...")

A soramimi version, from the Japanese Flash animation Maiyahi, translates these words as: (Note: This particular soramimi video featured an animated version of the popular Shift JIS art cat Monā, and inspired Gary Brolsma, whose own video sparked the Numa Numa phenomenon.)

米さ！米酒だろう！飲ま飲まイェイ！
Bei sa! Beishu darou! nomanoma-iei!
("Rice, obviously! Rice wine, most likely! Drink drink yay!")

== See also ==
- Homophonic translation – where a text in one language is translated into a near-homophonic text in another language, with no attempt to preserve the original meaning.
- "Caramelldansen", a Swedish-language song that became a meme on the Japanese-speaking internet in part due to listeners' frequent use of soramimi
- "Benny Lava", a soramimi of a song from the Tamil film Pennin Manathai Thottu
