= Chernomyrdinka =

Saying attributed to Viktor Chernomyrdin

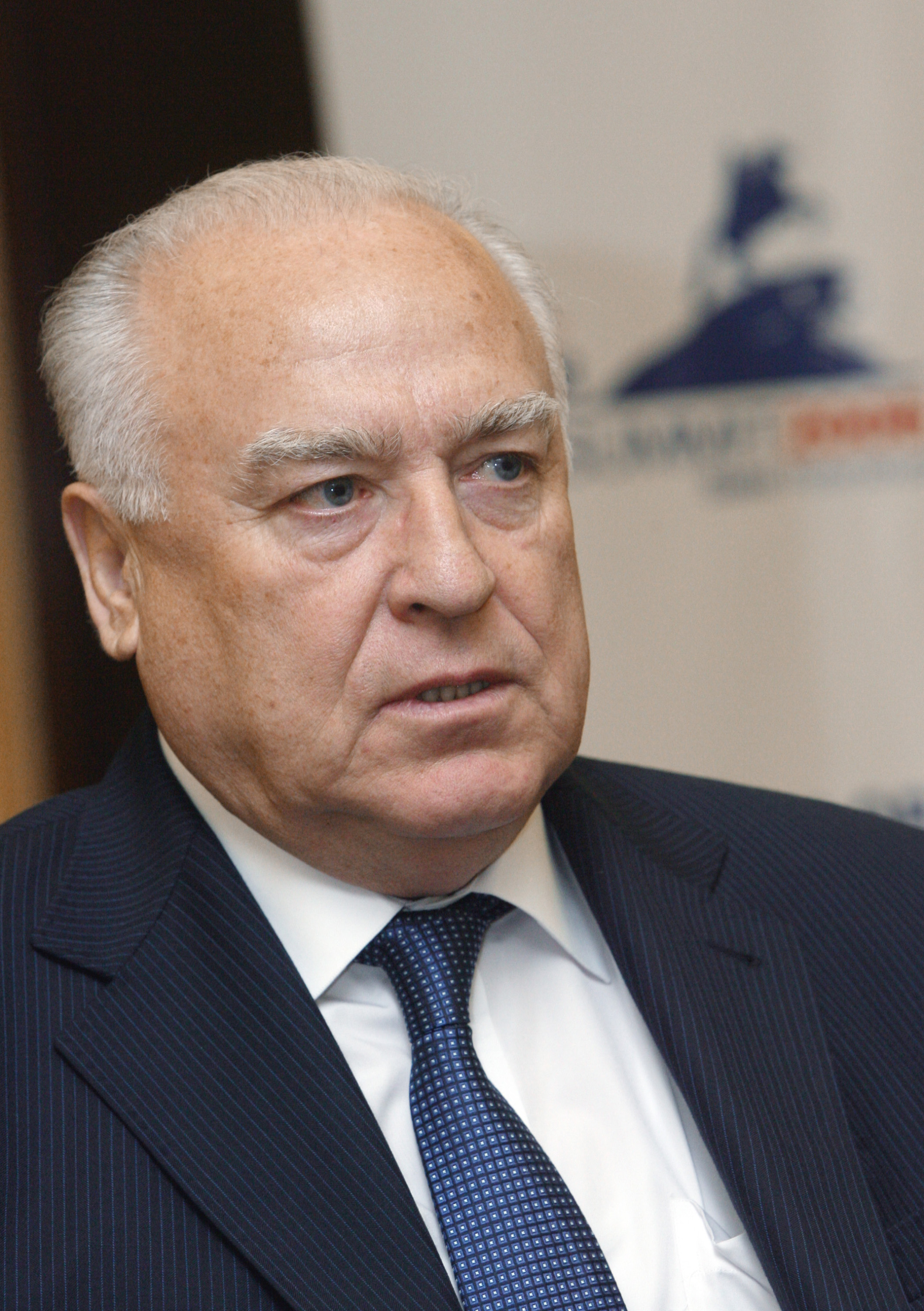
Viktor Chernomyrdin

A chernomyrdinka (Russian: Черномы́рдинка; plural: Черномы́рдинки) or a chernomyrdinism is a quotation, often a malapropism or a gaffe, attributed to the former Russian prime minister Viktor Chernomyrdin. Many of them entered the everyday Russian lexicon. The most famous example is "We wanted the best, but it turned out as always", uttered in the context of Russia's efforts in economic reforms, namely the monetary reform in Russia, 1993.

Chernomyrdinki were often accidental rather than scripted, and over time commentators have found them to be both humorous and inadvertently resonant. They were produced after the dissolution of the Soviet Union, when country leadership, including Chernomyrdin, attempted to speak "not from the paper sheet" (in other words, not in a scripted fashion) and without bureaucratisms typical of the late Soviet Union. Russian journalist Dmitry Travin writes that chernomyrdinki often reflected the spirit of the epoch better than thick books of writers and philosophers.

Russian writer and satirist Victor Shenderovich is quoted to say that he envies Chernomyrdin, writing that "a writer toils hard, but Chernomyrdin just opens his mouth, and here you go: a brilliant quote is here."

The Orenburg gas processing plant, whose first director was Chernomyrdin, on the occasion of its 45th anniversary opened a park dedicated to Chernomyrdin and adorned it with plaques with chernomyrdinki.

== Quotes ==
- "We wanted the best, but it turned out like always." (Хотели как лучше, а получилось как всегда) The phrase was uttered on August 6, 1993. Yuri Luzhkov described it as belonging to the golden pool of Russian managerial folklore. The first part of the phrase is a common Russian formula of excuse. Russian culturologist Konstantin Dushenko notes that according to internet statistics by Yandex, of all utterances by Russian politicians, this one is the runner-up after the "Putinism" Waste them in the outhouse. A similar phrase is traced to Pyotr Kropotkin: "The state ... wanted to do the best, but it turned out as always." We Wanted the Best... became the title of a book about Chernomyrdin and the Yeltsin epoch.
- "This has never happened before, and now it's happening again." (Отродясь такого не бывало, и опять то же самое; commonly cited as: Никогда такого не было, и вот опять)
- "Better than vodka, there is nothing worse." (Лучше водки – хуже нет!)
- "Whatever party we establish, it always turns out to be the Soviet Communist Party or the Kalashnikov rifle."
- "You can't scare a woman with high-heeled shoes."
- "We have accomplished all items: from A to B." (Мы выполнили все пункты: от А до Б)
- "I will not speak much, otherwise I will say something again." (Много говорить не буду, а то опять чего-нибудь скажу)

== See also ==
- Bushism
- Colemanballs
- Putinisms
- Lukashisms
- Yanukisms
- Yogi-isms
