= Bushism =

Unconventional statements by George W. Bush

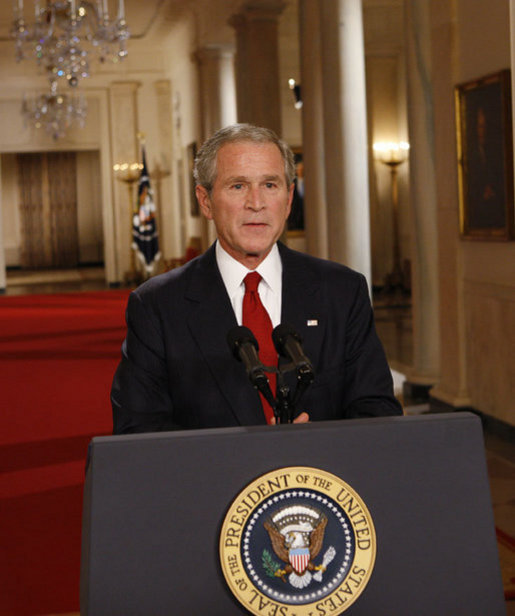
George W. Bush addressing the nation from the East Room, September 2008

Bushisms are unconventional statements, phrases, pronunciations, malapropisms, and semantic or linguistic errors made in the public speaking of George W. Bush, the 43rd president of the United States. Common characteristics of Bushisms include malapropisms, spoonerisms, the creation of neologisms or stunt words, and errors in subject–verb agreement.

== Discussion ==
Bush's use of the English language in formal and public speeches has spawned several books that document the statements. A poem titled "Make the Pie Higher", composed entirely of Bushisms, was compiled by cartoonist Richard Thompson. Various public figures and humorists, such as The Daily Show host Jon Stewart and Doonesbury cartoonist Garry Trudeau, have popularized Bushisms.

Linguist Mark Liberman of Language Log has suggested that Bush is not unusually error-prone in his speech, saying: "You can make any public figure sound like a boob, if you record everything he says and set hundreds of hostile observers to combing the transcripts for disfluencies, malapropisms, word formation errors and examples of non-standard pronunciation or usage... Which of us could stand up to a similar level of linguistic scrutiny?". In 2010, Philip Hensher called Bush's apparent coinage of the term "misunderestimated" one of his "most memorable additions to the language, and an incidentally expressive one: it may be that we rather needed a word for 'to underestimate by mistake'."

Stanford University lecturer and former Bush advisor Keith Hennessey has also argued that the number of Bush's verbal gaffes is not unusual given the significant amount of time that he has spoken in public, and that his successor Barack Obama's gaffes were not as scrutinized. In Hennessey's view, Bush "intentionally aimed his public image at average Americans rather than at Cambridge or Upper East Side elites".

British journalist Christopher Hitchens published an essay in The Nation in 2000 titled "Why Dubya Can't Read", writing:

I used to have the job of tutoring a dyslexic child, and I know something about the symptoms. So I kicked myself hard when I read the profile of Governor George W. Bush, by my friend and colleague Gail Sheehy, in this month's Vanity Fair. All those jokes and cartoons and websites about his gaffes, bungles and malapropisms? We've been unknowingly teasing the afflicted. The poor guy is obviously dyslexic, and dyslexic to the point of near-illiteracy. [...]

I know from my teaching experience that nature very often compensates the dyslexic with a higher IQ or some grant of intuitive intelligence. If this is true for Bush it hasn't yet become obvious.

Bush's statements were also notorious for their ability to state the opposite of what he intended, including his remarks on the estate tax: "I'm not sure 80% of people get the death tax. I know this: 100% will get it if I'm the president." These incidents have been described as or likened to Freudian slips.

In 2001, Bush poked fun at himself at the annual Radio & Television Correspondents Dinner (now the White House Correspondents Dinner), delivering a monologue reacting and responding to his Bushisms.

In 2008, Bush was given a satirical lifetime achievement Foot in Mouth Award for "services to gobbledygook" in reference to his various gaffes.

The term Bushism has become part of popular folklore and is the basis of a number of websites and published books. It is often used to caricature Bush.

== Examples ==
=== General ===
- "I think we agree, the past is over." – to his former primary election rival John McCain, Pittsburgh, Pennsylvania, May 10, 2000.
- "We can have filters on Internets where public money is spent." – during his third Presidential debate with Al Gore, October 17, 2000.
- "They misunderestimated me." – Bentonville, Arkansas, November 6, 2000.
- "I know the human being and fish can coexist peacefully." – while expressing opposition to removing dams to protect endangered fish species, Saginaw, Michigan, September 29, 2000.
- "Families is where our nation finds hope, where wings take dream." La Crosse, Wisconsin, October 18, 2000.
- "There's an old saying in Tennessee — I know it's in Texas, probably in Tennessee — that says, 'Fool me once, shame on...shame on you.' Fool me — you can't get fooled again." – while participating in Pledge Across America in Nashville, Tennessee, September 17, 2002.
- "Tribal sovereignty means that: It's sovereign. It's — you're a… you're a… you've been given sovereignty, and you're viewed… as a sovereign entity. And, therefore, the relationship between the Federal government and… Tribes is one between sovereign entities." – responding to a question by Mark Trahant of the Seattle Post Intelligencer during a White House press conference, August 6, 2004.
- "Too many good docs are getting out of the business. Too many OB-GYNs aren't able to practice their love with women all across this country." – Poplar Bluff, Missouri, September 6, 2004.
- "See, in my line of work you got to keep repeating things over and over and over again for the truth to sink in, to kind of catapult the propaganda." – Greece, New York, May 24, 2005.
- "I'll be long gone before some smart person ever figures out what happened inside this Oval Office." – in an interview with The Jerusalem Post, Washington, D.C., May 12, 2008.
- "I'm going to put people in my place, so when the history of this administration is written at least there's an authoritarian voice saying exactly what happened." – while announcing he would write a book about "the 12 toughest decisions" he had to make." – Calgary, Canada, March 17, 2009.

=== Foreign affairs ===
- "This is still a dangerous world. It's a world of madmen and uncertainty and potential mental losses." – according to the Financial Times, the phrase "mental losses" seemed to be a malapropism of "missile launches". Charleston, South Carolina, January 2000.
- "I'm the commander, see. I don't need to explain — I do not need to explain why I say things. That's the interesting thing about being the President. Maybe somebody needs to explain to me why they say something, but I don't feel like I owe anybody an explanation." – Crawford, Texas, November 2002.
- "I just want you to know that, when we talk about war, we're really talking about peace." – Washington, D.C., June 18, 2002.
- "We must stop the terror. I call upon all nations, to do everything they can, to stop these terrorist killers. Thank you. Now watch this drive." – To reporters while playing golf. – August 4, 2002.
- "I was proud the other day when both Republicans and Democrats stood with me in the Rose Garden to announce their support for a clear statement of purpose: you [Saddam Hussein] disarm, or we will." – Manchester, New Hampshire, October 5, 2002.
- "And, you know, it'll take time to restore chaos... And order — order out of chaos. But we will." – when asked to deliver a message for the Iraqi people, Washington, D.C., April 13, 2003.
- "Our enemies are innovative and resourceful, and so are we. They never stop thinking about new ways to harm our country and our people, and neither do we." – Washington, D.C., August 5, 2004.
- "When you think about it, in the first month of the new year there will be an election in the Palestinian territory and there will be an election in Iraq. Who could have possibly envisioned an erection — an election in Iraq?" – Washington, D.C., January 10, 2005.
- "Well, I mean that a defeat in Iraq will embolden the enemy and will provide the enemy—more opportunity to train, plan, to attack us. That's what I mean. There—it's—you know, one of the hardest parts of my job is to connect Iraq to the war on terror." – Washington, D.C., September 6, 2006.
- "Yesterday, you made note of my — the lack of my talent when it came to dancing. But nevertheless, I want you to know I danced with joy. And no question Liberia has gone through very difficult times." – to President of Liberia Ellen Johnson Sirleaf, Washington, D.C., October 22, 2008.
- "I'm telling you there's an enemy that would like to attack America, Americans, again. There just is. That's the reality of the world. And I wish him all the very best." – Washington, D.C., January 12, 2009.
- "The decision of one man [Vladimir Putin], to launch a wholly unjustified and brutal invasion of Iraq. I mean, of Ukraine. Iraq too. Anyway...[I'm] 75." – in an address to the George W. Bush Institute, May 18, 2022.

=== Economics ===
- "If you're a single mother with two children — which is the toughest job in America, as far as I'm concerned — you're working hard to put food on your family." – Nashua, New Hampshire, 27 January 2000.
- "You bet I cut the taxes at the top. That encourages entrepreneurship. What we Republicans should stand for is growth in the economy. We ought to make the pie higher." – Columbia, South Carolina, February 15, 2000.
- "You work three jobs? ... Uniquely American, isn't it? I mean, that is fantastic that you're doing that." – Omaha, Nebraska, February 4, 2005.

=== Education ===
- "Rarely is the question asked: is our children learning?" – Florence, South Carolina, January 11, 2000.
- "You teach a child to read, and he or her will be able to pass a literacy test." − Townsend, Tennessee, February 21, 2001.
- "As yesterday's positive report card shows, childrens do learn, when standards are high and results are measured." – New York City, September 2007.

== See also ==
- Anguish Languish
- Bertiespeak, English as spoken by Bertie Ahern
- Chernomyrdinka, similar sayings by or attributed to Viktor Chernomyrdin
- Colemanballs, similar sayings by sports broadcasters
- Covfefe, an apparent typo by Donald Trump
- Trumpisms, rhetoric and characteristic phrases of Donald Trump.
- Eggcorn
- Great Moments in Presidential Speeches, a recurring sketch airing on Late Show with David Letterman during the Bush administration
- List of nicknames used by George W. Bush
- Putinisms, similar sayings by Vladimir Putin
- Raffarinade, similar sayings by Jean-Pierre Raffarin
- Strategery, a mock-Bushism coined by comedian Will Ferrell
- Yogiisms, similar sayings by baseball player Yogi Berra
- Yanukisms, similar sayings and gaffes by Ukrainian President Viktor Yanukovych
- Lukashisms, similar statements by Belarusian President Alexander Lukashenko
- Wałęsism, similar sayings by Polish President Lech Wałęsa
