= Political gaffe =

Error made by a politician in a speech

A political gaffe is an error in speech made by a politician.

== Definition ==
According to Barack Obama, a gaffe is:

used by the press to describe any maladroit phrase by a candidate that reveals ignorance, carelessness, fuzzy thinking, insensitivity, malice, boorishness, falsehood, or hypocrisy – or is simply deemed to veer sufficiently far from the conventional wisdom to make said candidate vulnerable to attack.

Gaffes may fuel speculation about, or provide cover for, broader mental decline. US presidents Biden and Trump have both been the targets of such discourse.

== Kinsley gaffe ==
A Kinsley gaffe occurs when a political gaffe reveals some truth that a politician did not intend to admit. The term comes from journalist Michael Kinsley, who said, "A gaffe is when a politician tells the truth – some obvious truth he isn't supposed to say."

The term political gaffe may be used to describe an inadvertent statement made by a politician, who believes the statement to be true, while having not fully analyzed the consequences of publicly stating it. Another definition is a statement made when the politician privately believes it to be true, realizes the dire consequences of saying it, and yet inadvertently utters it in public. Another definition is a politician's statement of what is on their mind—this may or may not be inadvertent—thereby leading to a ritualized "gaffe dance" between candidates. While exhibiting umbrage or shock, and playing on the mistake, the ostensibly offended candidate must not exhibit anything resembling glee. A propensity to concentrate on so-called "gaffes" in campaigns has been criticized as a journalistic device that can lead to distraction from real issues. (Note: ". . . the episode is a perfect gaffe precisely because its content was so meaningless. . ." Chait, Jonathan (14 June 2012). "The Origins of the Gaffe, Politics' Idiot-Maker". New York.) The Kinsley gaffe is said to be a species of the general "political gaffe."

Kinsley himself posed the question: "Why should something a politician says by accident automatically be taken as a better sign of his or her real thinking than something he or she says on purpose?"

Psycholinguist Steven Pinker has contended that politicians use vague and indirect language to avoid making concrete statements, and that lazy journalists base political coverage around "gaffe spotting" rather than analysis of political platforms.

The rise of Internet activism has created a new generation of negative campaigning where a political campaign can create attack ads within an hour of a politician making a gaffe.

== Notable gaffes by country ==
=== Australia ===
- On August 12, 2013, at a Liberal Party function in Melbourne as part of the 2013 Federal Election campaign, Australian Opposition Leader Tony Abbott, criticising Prime Minister Kevin Rudd, said "No one, however smart, however well-educated, however experienced, is the suppository of all wisdom." The word he meant was "repository".

=== Azerbaijan ===
- The Central Election Commission showed Ilham Aliyev to be winning with 72.76% of the vote via the Commission's official smartphone app a day before voting had even started for the 2013 elections.

=== Canada ===
- "Air pollution is the smell of money" – Philip Gaglardi.
- Pierre Trudeau and the fuddle duddle incident, 1971
- Jacques Parizeau's 'money and the ethnic vote' speech, 1995
- Peter MacKay calling his ex-girlfriend Belinda Stronach a dog after she joined the opposition party.
- "Evil reptilian kitten eater from another planet" – 2003 Ontario general election

=== Israel ===
- On a TV debate with prime minister Benjamin Netanyahu, Isaac Herzog, the leader of the opposition said "I will keep Netanyahu united", instead of "I will keep Jerusalem united."

=== Netherlands ===
- During a 2009 speech in Mexico City, crown prince Willem-Alexander mistranslated the proverb "A sleeping shrimp gets carried away by the tide" roughly as "A sleeping shrimp gets screwed."

=== Poland ===
- Polish Foreign Minister Witold Waszczykowski told reporters on 10 January 2017 that he had established diplomatic relations with "San Escobar", a nonexistent country.

=== Portugal ===
- "Everyone will give their best for a poorer country" – Prime Minister José Sócrates.

=== United Kingdom ===
- Winston Churchill's election broadcast in the campaign for the 1945 general election in which he suggested that the Labour Party would create "some form of a Gestapo" to implement their reforms.
- John Major calling some of his cabinet ministers bastards.
- Gordon Brown referring to a member of the public as a "bigoted woman" during an election campaign.

=== United States ===
- The Gerald Ford Soviet Domination answer.
- The Jimmy Carter "Lust in the Heart" interview
- During a sound check before a recorded television address, President Ronald Reagan improvised, "We begin bombing in five minutes." The footage was later leaked and prompted negative reactions domestically and in the Soviet Union.
- When Robert Bork was asked by the Senate Judiciary Committee why he wanted to serve on the Supreme Court, he replied that it would be "an intellectual feast". The remark was seen as callous and provided ammunition for Bork's ideological opponents to sink his already contentious nomination. (Mark Gitenstein, then chief counsel for the committee, later recalled that Bork's answer prompted many to wonder, "Who's the dinner?".)
- "Oh, the vision thing." – George H. W. Bush
- While invigilating a spelling bee, Vice President Dan Quayle insisted that a 12 year old student had missed the letter e at the end of "potatoe". Quayle later wrote, "It was more than a gaffe[. ]It was a 'defining moment' of the worst imaginable kind." The student later recalled, "I know it was a bad day for him, but it was a good day for me."

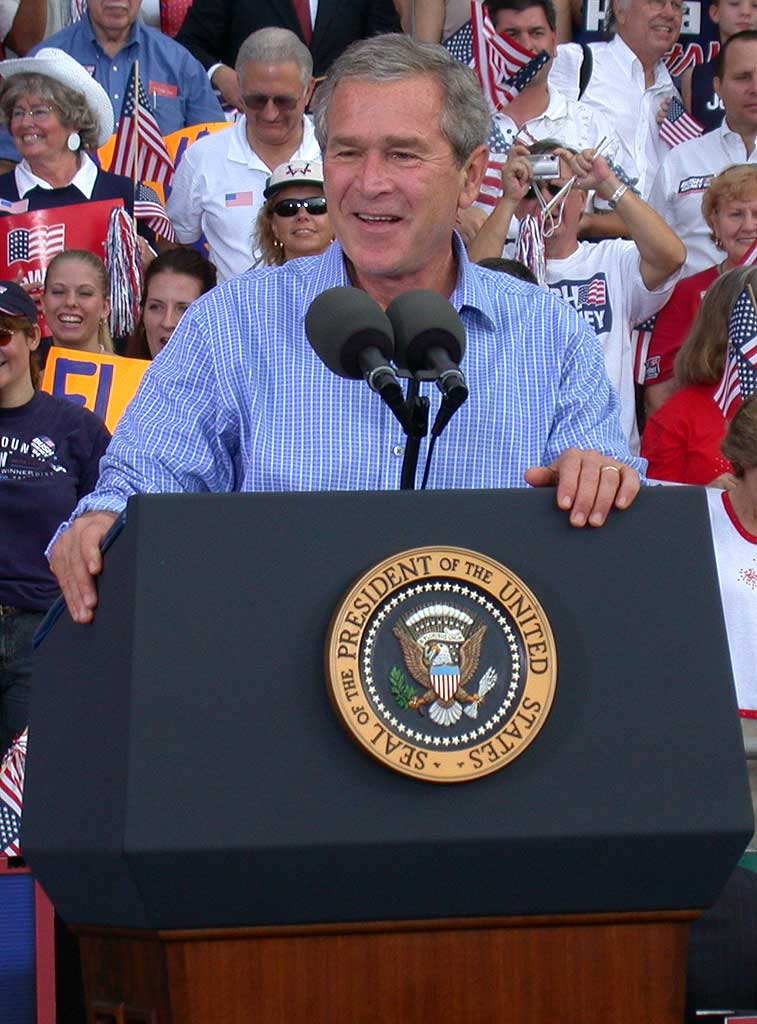
George W. Bush was famous for making gaffes

- "You forgot Poland" and numerous others - George W. Bush
- "I mean, you got the first mainstream African-American, who is articulate and bright and clean and a nice-looking guy. I mean, that's a storybook, man!" – Joe Biden
- Todd Akin, a candidate for federal senate in the 2012 election in Missouri, said he was skeptical of the need for women to procure abortions after rape because "If it's a legitimate rape, the female body has ways to try to shut that whole thing down. But let's assume that maybe that didn't work or something...".
- Rick Perry's "Oops moment"
- At a private fundraiser for his 2012 presidential campaign against Barack Obama, Mitt Romney remarked that "there are 47 percent who are with him, who are dependent upon government, who believe that they are victims, who believe the government has a responsibility to care for them, who believe that they are entitled to health care, to food, to housing, to you name it."
- During a Iowa election for senate in 2014, Bruce Braley told an association of trial attorneys that his opponent Chuck Grassley was "a farmer from Iowa, who never went to law school". His comments were poorly received by Iowa's heavily agrarian population.
- Joe Biden's remark that "No matter how deeply involved you are in the U.S. … there’s only one guarantee ... and that's the state of Israel" was characterized as a Kinsley gaffe.
- United States House of Representatives Kevin McCarthy — favored as successor to Speaker of the House John Boehner — "made Kinsley proud" as he bragged on Fox News's Sean Hannity show that the House GOP Investigation into the 2012 Benghazi attack had been effective in eroding Hillary Clinton's popularity, thus implying that the purpose of the investigation had been political.
- Hillary Clinton linking her Wall Street donors to 9/11
- While running for president in 2016, Hillary Clinton referred to half of Donald Trump's supporters as belonging to a "basket of deplorables".
- When John Kasich, the governor of the state of Ohio, was asked why the District of Columbia is unrepresented in the United States Congress, he answered frankly that the situation disfranchised Democratic Party voters.
- Maine governor Paul LePage, in vetoing a bill that would have made Narcan available to save addicts from overdoses, stated that the drug "does not truly save lives; it merely extends them until the next overdose".
- When asked how he might resolve the besiegement of Aleppo during the Syrian civil war, presidential candidate Gary Johnson asked the interviewer, "What is Aleppo?". He later said: "I guess I'm having an Aleppo moment", when he was asked to name a foreign leader whom he admires.
- Donald Trump's statement that "It has not been easy for me... My father gave me a small loan of a million dollars" was characterized as one of many gaffes that would fell any normal politician, but appeared to cause no reputational damage to Trump.
- Congressperson Alexandria Ocasio-Cortez unveiled a resolution for Green New Deal climate legislation that called for government payments to those who were "unable or unwilling to work", the phasing out of all air travel, and rebuilding every structure in the United States to comply with new environmental standards. Her office pulled it from her website and stated that the "wrong version" was uploaded.
- Michael Bloomberg's 2008 comments describing how the end of redlining triggered the subprime mortgage crisis and, while speaking to the Aspen Institute in 2015, his description of how stop-and-frisk was used to reduce minority crime.

Joe Biden, a veritable "gaffe machine", once publicly introduced Ukrainian President Volodymyr Zelenskyy as "President Putin".

- During the tenth 2020 Democratic presidential debate immediately prior to that year's South Carolina primary, candidate Michael Bloomberg nearly stated that he "bought" 21 congressional seats that contributed to the Democrats gaining control of the House of Representatives.
- During a political rally, Joe Biden said "poor kids are just as bright and just as talented as white kids"
- During the 2020 presidential election, Joe Biden said that he was running for the U.S. Senate.
- In 2020, Joe Biden told Charlamagne tha God during an interview that "if you have a problem figuring out whether you're for me or Trump, then you ain't Black."
- In 2024, Joe Biden introduced Ukrainian President Volodymyr Zelenskyy as "President Putin", with whom Zelensky was currently at war. In the same speech, he referred to Vice Present Kamala Harris as "Vice President Trump".

== See also ==
- Bushism, gaffes by former U.S. President George W. Bush
- Covfefe, a word used by U.S. President Donald Trump on Twitter
- Chernomyrdinka, gaffes attributed to former Russian prime minister Viktor Chernomyrdin
- Error § Gaffe
- Lukashisms, gaffes of President of Belarus Alexander Lukashenko
- Public image of Joe Biden § Political gaffes
