= Vladimir Putin's language =

Speech used by the Russian President

Vladimir Putin's use of language, characterized by a straightforward style abundant in colloquialisms, greatly contributes to the president's popularity in Russia. The most notable feature of it are "putinisms", quotes and excerpts from Putin's speeches, many of which are catchphrases and aphorisms well known in Russia, but which often baffled interpreters.

== General characteristics ==
Michele A. Berdy in an article in The Moscow Times described Putin's speech as follows: "Not a bad speaker. No misplaced stresses or other deviations from the strict Russian grammatical norms. No rambling or unclear thoughts. Good diction, punchy delivery, well-constructed speeches". In his speeches he often used folk sayings and criminal slang. She wrote that journalists used to wait eagerly for Putin's press conferences for his new "Putinisms". She noted that by 2018 the informality of Putin's speech had disappeared.

In his analysis of Putin's language, Michael Gorham remarks on moderate "oratorial prowess" of Putin compared to, e.g., that of Anatoly Sobchak or Vladimir Zhirinovsky. Gorham classified the public images delivered by Putin's speeches into those of "technocrat", "businessman", "silovik", "simple man", and "patriot". He concludes that Putin's charisma lies in his ability to combine these verbal images and manipulate with them to evoke sympathy from various strata of the population of Russia.

Russian linguist Maksim Krongauz remarks that a peculiarity of putinisms is insertions of low language register into the literate speech. He remarks that this is Putin's instrument to increase the level of the perception of his speech.

== Putinisms ==
Alluding to Rudyard Kipling's python Kaa, Putin addresses the Russian non-system opposition, who, according to him, work for foreign interests: Come to me, Bandar-logs!

Putin has produced a number of popular aphorisms and catch-phrases, known as putinisms. Many of them were first made during his annual Q&A conferences, where Putin answered questions from journalists and other people in the studio, as well as from Russians throughout the country, who either phoned in or spoke from studios and outdoor sites across Russia. Putin is known for his often tough and sharp language.

Notable putinisms include:

- Waste them in the outhouse («Мочить в сортире») – One of the earliest form of putinism, made in September 1999, when he promised to destroy terrorists wherever they were found, including in outhouses. A literal translation is 'to wet in an outhouse'. Importantly, the old-standing Russian criminal slang expression "to wet" means "to murder". In 2010, Putin also promised to scrape the remaining terrorists out from the bottom of a sewer («выковырять со дна канализации»).
- Comrade Wolf – Putin's remark, describing the policies of the United States. In a reference to the US-led invasion of Iraq, Putin said: "As they say, 'comrade wolf knows whom to eat.' He eats without listening and he is clearly not going to listen to anyone". There are two possible cultural references for this phrase:
  - There is a Russian political joke: Rabinovich is walking through the forest with a sheep, when both of them stumble into a pit. A few minutes later, a wolf also falls into the pit. The sheep gets nervous and starts bleating. "What's with all the baaahh, baaahh?" Rabinovich asks. "Comrade Wolf knows whom to eat".
  - A possible origin is a 1967 comedy sketch "Hare" delivered by a popular Soviet comedian Arkadi Raikin from his series Monologues of Animals, written by Mark Azov. In the sketch Hare tells how responsible he was at following the instructions: "Comrade Wolf personally appointed me to be eaten. He sat me down on a hillock and said: 'Sit and wait until I eat you.' And the river started flooding. The water is already up to my belly. All the animals are running, scrambling, and I’m sitting, following the instructions, waiting. Comrade Wolf knows whom to eat."
- She sank. («Она утонула») – Putin's short answer to a question from Larry King in September 2000 asking what happened to the Russian submarine Kursk (K-141). Many criticized Putin for the cynicism perceived in this answer.
- Plowed away like a slave on a galley («Пахал, как раб на галерах») (Note: The Russian verb пахать also figuratively means 'to work hard'.) – This is how Putin described his work as President of Russia from 2000 to 2008 during a Q&A conference in February 2008. Not only did the phrase itself became popular, but a wrong hearing of it—«как раб» ('like a slave') sounding near identical to «как краб» ('like a crab')—led to the appearance of an internet nickname for Putin, "Crabbe" (Краббе); Dmitry Medvedev was similarly nicknamed "Shmele" (Шмеле) which is a non-existent vocative form of шмель, meaning 'bumblebee'.
- Ears of a dead donkey («От мертвого осла уши») – Quoting Ostap Bender from a popular Soviet novel The Little Golden Calf, that was, according to Putin, what Latvia would receive instead of the western Pytalovsky District of Russia claimed by Latvia in a territorial dispute stemming from the Soviet border redrawing. On 27 March 2007 Russia and Latvia signed the treaty on state border, in which Latvia renounced its territorial claims.
- At the very least, a civil servant should have a head. («Как минимум государственный деятель должен иметь голову.») – Putin's response to Hillary Clinton's claim that Putin has no soul. He also recommended that international relations be built without emotion and instead on the basis of the fundamental interests of the states involved.

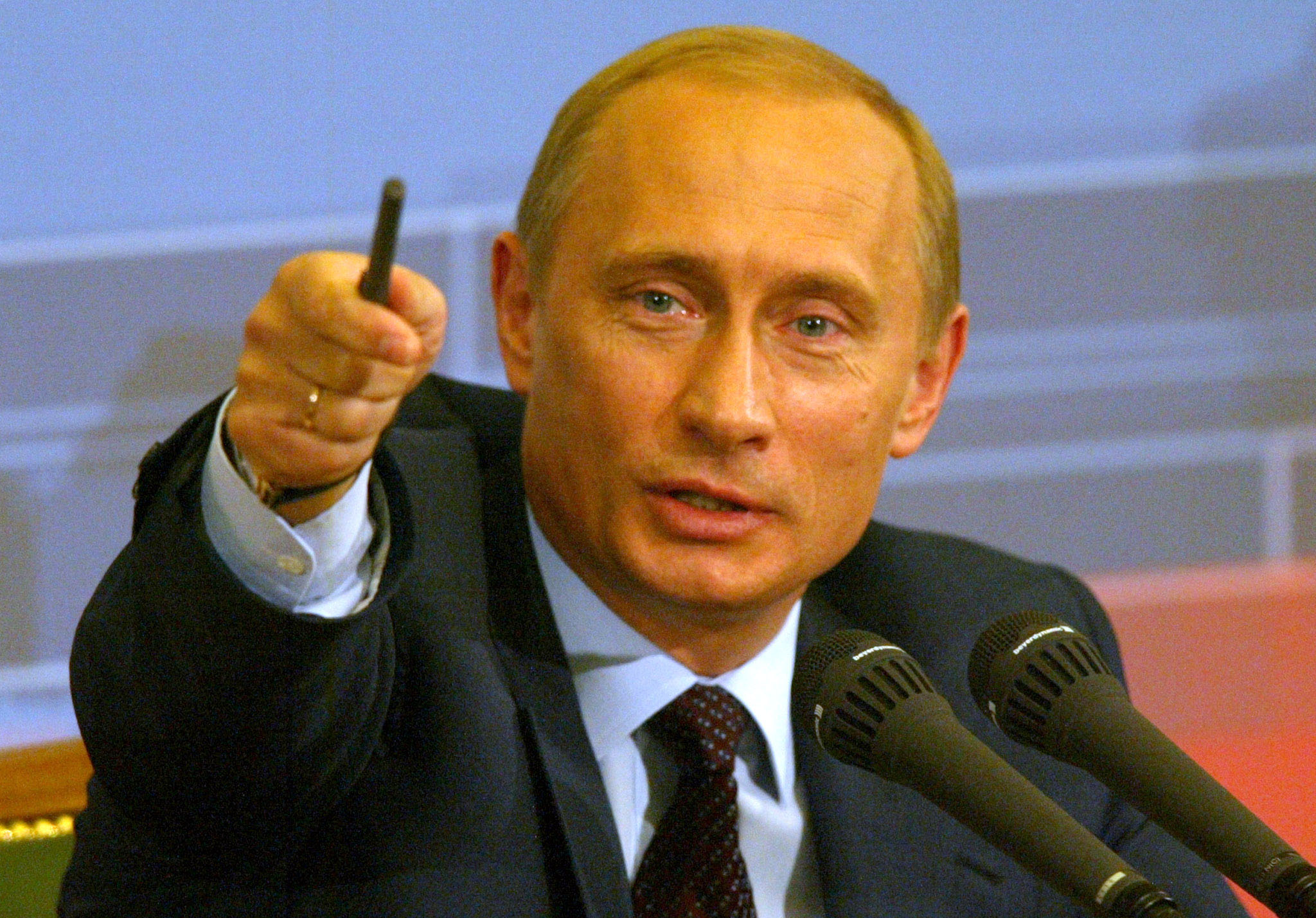
Putin during one of his annual Q&A conferences, indicating with his pen

- Give my pen back. («Ручку верните.») – A phrase said by Putin to the industrial oligarch Oleg Deripaska, after Deripaska was forced by Putin to sign, using Putin's pen, an agreement aimed at resolving a socioeconomic crisis in the monograd of Pikalyovo on 4 June 2009, which had escalated after the different owners of the aluminum oxide plant and connected enterprises in the town did not pay their workers' salaries and were unable to negotiate the terms on which the local industrial complex would work. Putin came to the scene personally to conduct the negotiations.
- Shearing a piglet («Стричь поросенка») – On 25 June 2013, Putin revealed the surveillance whistleblower Edward Snowden was indeed in a Moscow airport, ending a global guessing game over the US fugitive's whereabouts. Putin lashed out at US accusations that Russia was harbouring a fugitive, saying "I'd rather not deal with such questions, because anyway it's like shearing a piglet—a lot of squealing but little wool".
- Russia is not the kind of a country that extradites human rights activists. («Россия не та страна, которая выдаёт борцов за права человека.») – This comment on Snowden during the Q&A session with CNBC at the SPIEF on 23 May 2014 was followed by a storm of laughter and applause. Kommersant described the reaction as follows: "A tempest of elation and applause erupted, and a howl of laughter and weeping hung over the hall" («Поднялась просто буря восторга, аплодисментов, над залом застрял стон из хохота и плача»), and commented that not everybody grasped the full meaning of the utterance.
- Don't wait for it! or Don't waste time waiting! («Не дождетесь!») – Various Russian media noticed that at the 20 December 2018 press conference, when asked about his health, Putin answered with the punch line from a Jewish joke: Old Rabinovich is greeted: "Hi! How is your health?" — "Don't wait for it!" he answers. Putin invoked the same joke at the 23 January 2000 press conference when commenting on the talks about his potential long-term dictatorship.
- Defenseless Russian bomber («беззащитный российский бомбардировщик») – This Russian internet meme of late 2015 was in fact a transcription error: Putin was talking about the "unsupported bomber" (незащищенный бомбардировщик) when commenting on the 2015 Russian Sukhoi Su-24 shootdown by a Turkish fighter jet.
- Oinking along («Подхрюкивают») – Uttered during Putin's 2019 "State Of The Nation" address. The context was the American allegations that Russians violate the ABM Treaty. Putin responded that the Americans were first to violate it and "they are also mobilising their satellites that are cautious but still make noises in support of the USA". Here "make noises in support" is the official translation of подхрюкивают, while the literal translation would be "oink along" (in an analogy with 'sing along' for подпевают) with a similar metaphorical meaning). The witticism brought applause from the audience. A number of observers commented on the untranslatability of the word and suggested other translations, such as 'to grunt along', 'to take up grunting', or 'to echo'.
- "Russian 'girls of loose morals' are undoubtedly the best in the world" – In 2017 media outlets commented that Putin, discussing Donald Trump, told reporters: "I find it hard to believe that he [Trump] rushed to some hotel to meet girls of loose morals, although ours [Russian] are undoubtedly the best in the world". Zack Beaucamp of Vox commented that with this utterance Putin pursued two goals: to irritate the Westerners and to connect with his Russian supporters.
- "When a radiator battery drops on your foot, say 'Radish!', rather than use obscene language". Here "radish" (редиска) is a criminal pseudo-argot term meaning "bad man" invented for the Russian cult film Gentlemen of Fortune, which actually entered the Russian colloquial parlance.

== See also ==
- Bushism
- Chernomyrdinka
- Lukashisms
