= Malapropism =

Misuse of a word

A malapropism (/ˈmæləprɒpɪzəm/; also called a malaprop, acyrologia or Dogberryism) is the incorrect use of a word in place of a word with a similar sound, either unintentionally or for comedic effect, resulting in a nonsensical, often humorous utterance. An example is the statement attributed to baseball player Yogi Berra, regarding switch hitters, "He hits from both sides of the plate. He's amphibious", with the accidental use of amphibious rather than the intended ambidextrous. Malapropisms often occur as errors in natural speech and are sometimes the subject of media attention, especially when made by politicians or other prominent individuals.

== Etymology ==
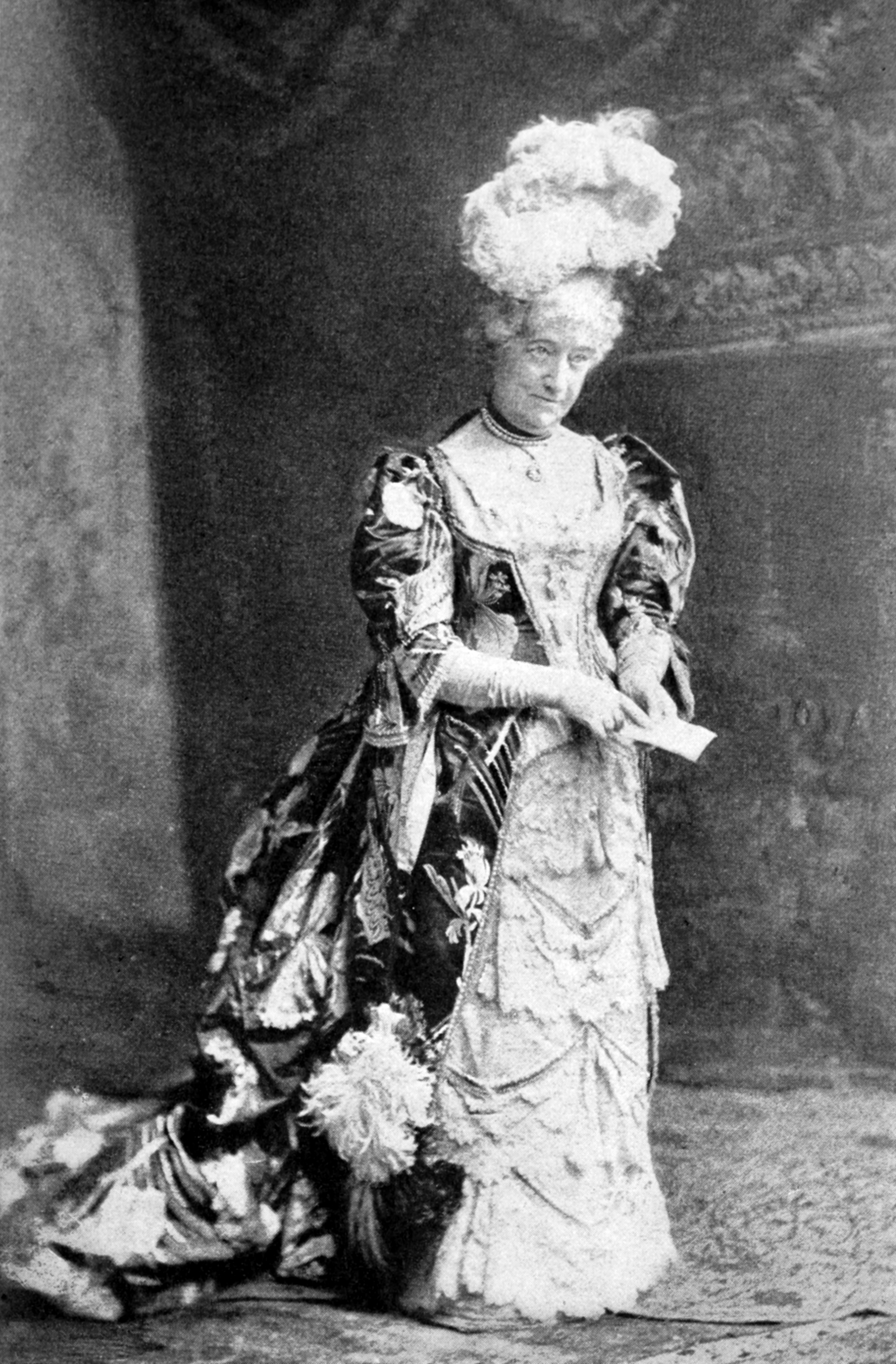
Louisa Lane Drew as Mrs. Malaprop in an 1895 production of The Rivals

The word "malapropism" (and its earlier form, "malaprop") comes from a character named "Mrs. Malaprop" in Richard Brinsley Sheridan's 1775 play The Rivals. Mrs. Malaprop frequently misspeaks (to comic effect) by using words which do not have the meaning that she intends but which sound similar to words that do. Sheridan chose her name in humorous reference to the word malapropos, an adjective or adverb meaning "inappropriate" or "inappropriately", derived from the French phrase mal à propos (literally "poorly placed"). According to the Oxford English Dictionary, the first recorded use of malapropos in English is from 1630, and the first person known to have used the word malaprop specifically in the sense of "a speech error" is Lord Byron in 1814.

The synonymous term Dogberryism comes from the 1598 Shakespeare play Much Ado About Nothing in which the character Dogberry utters many malapropisms to humorous effect. Though Shakespeare was an earlier writer than Sheridan, malaprop/malapropism seems an earlier coinage than Dogberryism, which is not attested until 1836.

== Distinguishing features ==
An instance of speech error is called a malapropism when a word is produced which is nonsensical or ludicrous in context yet similar in sound to what was intended.

Definitions differ somewhat in terms of the cause of the error. Some scholars include only errors that result from a temporary failure to produce the word which the speaker intended. Such errors are sometimes called "Fay–Cutler malapropism", after psycholinguists David Fay and Anne Cutler, who described the occurrence of such errors in ordinary speech. Most definitions, however, include any actual word that is wrongly or accidentally used in place of a similar sounding, correct word. This broader definition is sometimes called "classical malapropism", or simply "malapropism".

Malapropisms differ from other kinds of speaking or writing mistakes, such as eggcorns or spoonerisms, as well as the accidental or deliberate production of newly made-up words (neologisms).

For example, it is not a malapropism to use obtuse [wide or dull] instead of acute [narrow or sharp]; it is a malapropism to use obtuse [stupid or slow-witted] when one means abstruse [esoteric or difficult to understand].

Malapropisms tend to maintain the part of speech of the originally intended word. According to linguist Jean Aitchison, "The finding that word selection errors preserve their part of speech suggest[s] that the latter is an integral part of the word, and tightly attached to it." Likewise, substitutions tend to have the same number of syllables and the same metrical structure – the same pattern of stressed and unstressed syllables – as the intended word or phrase. If the stress pattern of the malapropism differs from the intended word, unstressed syllables may be deleted or inserted; stressed syllables and the general rhythmic pattern are maintained.

== Examples from fiction and comedy ==
The term is named for the fictional Mrs. Malaprop in Sheridan's play The Rivals, who frequently replaces words in her speech. For example: declares to Captain Absolute in Act 3 Scene III: "Sure, if I reprehend any thing in this world it is the use of my oracular tongue, and a nice derangement of epitaphs!" This nonsensical utterance might, for example, be corrected to, "If I apprehend anything in this world, it is the use of my vernacular tongue, and a nice arrangement of epithets", —although these are not the only words that can be substituted to produce an appropriately expressed thought in this context, and commentators have proposed other possible replacements that work just as well. Other malapropisms spoken by Mrs. Malaprop include "illiterate him quite from your memory" (instead of "obliterate"), "he is the very pineapple of politeness" (instead of pinnacle) and "she's as headstrong as an allegory on the banks of the Nile" (instead of alligator).

Malapropisms appeared in many works before Sheridan created the character of Mrs. Malaprop. William Shakespeare used them in a number of his plays, almost invariably spoken by comic ill-educated lower class characters. Mistress Quickly, the inn-keeper associate of Falstaff in several Shakespeare plays, is a regular user of malapropisms. In Act 3, Scene V of Much Ado About Nothing, Constable Dogberry tells Governor Leonato, "Our watch, sir, have indeed comprehended two auspicious persons" (i.e., apprehended two suspicious persons).

Malapropism was one of Stan Laurel's comic mannerisms. In Sons of the Desert, for example, he says that his partner Oliver Hardy is suffering a nervous "shakedown" (rather than "breakdown"), calls the Exalted Ruler of their group the "exhausted ruler" and says that he and Oliver are like "two peas in a pot" (instead of "pod"); in The Music Box, he inadvertently asked a policeman, "Don't you think you're bounding over your steps?" meaning "overstepping your bounds", which has much in common with the transposition of a Spoonerism. Sometimes even Laurel's partner Hardy also practiced malapropism, particularly correcting Stan's; in The Live Ghost Stan tells a captain that he heard the ocean is infatuated with sharks. Oliver is quick to call out Stan's malapropism only to correct him with another: "Not infatuated! He means infuriated." The correct word in question is actually infested.

Emily Litella, a fictional character created and performed by American comedian Gilda Radner, used malapropism to entertain viewers on the late-night comedy show Saturday Night Live, including one skit in which she was puzzled over the hubbub surrounding the "plight of Soviet jewelry" instead of "Soviet Jewry".

British comedian Ronnie Barker also made great use of deliberate malapropisms in his comedy, notably in such sketches as his "Appeal on behalf of the Loyal Society for the Relief of Suffers from Pismronunciation", which mixed malapropisms and garbled words for comic effect – including news of a speech which "gave us a few well-frozen worms (i.e., well-chosen words) in praise of the society".

Ring Lardner used malapropism extensively for comic effect. For example, in his short story The Young Immigrunts, the four-year-old narrator repeatedly refers to a bride and groom as the "bride and glum".

Archie Bunker, a character in the American TV sitcom All in the Family, used malapropisms frequently: he refers, for example, to "off-the-docks Jews" (Orthodox Jews) and the "Women's Lubrication Movement" (rather than Liberation). Intending to refer to the medical specialized field of gynecology and to specialist in that field as a gynecologist, he would mispronounce the words as "groinecology" and "groinecologist".

Tyler Perry's fictional character Madea is known for her Southern dialectical usage of malapropisms, which some critics link to the mammy archetype.

Ricky LaFleur of the Trailer Park Boys is known for his constant malapropisms, which are often called "Rickyisms". Some of his more notable ones include "worst case Ontario" (instead of "worst case scenario") and "two turnips in heat" (instead of "turn up the heat").

A parody by author Michael Rosen of the traditional story of Hansel and Gretel, entitled "Handsel and Gristle," makes extensive use of malapropisms. For example, the character of the woodcutter becomes the "woodnutter," their "cottage" is replaced with a "sausage" and the word "any" is replaced with the proper noun "Lenny" - who is also treated as an additional character by the narrator whenever this occurs.

== Real-life examples ==
Malapropisms do not occur only as comedic literary devices. They also occur as a kind of speech error in ordinary speech. Malapropisms of a number of notable persons have individual names, such as "Bushism", "Wałęsism", etc. Other notable examples quoted in the media are:

- Former Australian prime minister Tony Abbott once claimed that no one "is the suppository of all wisdom" (i.e., repository or depository).
- Similarly, as reported in New Scientist, an office worker had described a colleague as "a vast suppository of information". The worker then apologised for his "Miss-Marple-ism" (i.e., malapropism). New Scientist noted this as possibly the first time anyone had uttered a malapropism for the word malapropism itself.
- Bertie Ahern, a former Taoiseach of Ireland, once warned his country against "upsetting the apple tart" (apple cart) of his country's economic success.
- Richard J. Daley, a former mayor of Chicago, referred to a tandem bicycle as a "tantrum bicycle" and made mention of "Alcoholics Unanimous" (Alcoholics Anonymous).
- Beatles drummer Ringo Starr's idiosyncratic turns of phrase or "Ringoisms", such as "a hard day's night" and "tomorrow never knows", were used as song titles by the Beatles, particularly by John Lennon.
- Rick Perry, a former Governor of Texas, has been known to commonly utter malapropisms. For example, he described states as "lavatories of innovation and democracy" instead of "laboratories".
- During a Senate hearing, Philippine presidential communications assistant secretary Mocha Uson stumbled on the legal phrase "right against self-incrimination" by invoking her "right against self-discrimination" instead.
- In 2016, Welsh Conservative leader Andrew Davies encouraged the Conservative Party conference to make breakfast (Brexit) a success.
- World heavyweight champion boxer Mike Tyson, upon being asked about his next plans moments after losing in a world title fight with Lennox Lewis, declared that "I might fade into Bolivian" (oblivion).
- During the COVID-19 pandemic, a common meme format was introduced where Internet users feigned malapropism by substituting the word "pandemic" with similar sounding words (such as "panorama", "pandemonium", or "panini"), a practice often attributed to Black Twitter.
- United States congresswoman Marjorie Taylor Greene has uttered various malapropisms, including "peach tree dish" (petri dish), "gazpacho police" (Gestapo), and "fragrantly violated" (flagrantly), among others.
- During the lead-up to the 2022 U.S. midterm elections, Republican Senate candidate Herschel Walker was mocked online after stating "this erection is about the people" (election), during an interview on Fox News.
- In March 2024, Maryland Democratic Representative and Senate front-runner candidate David Trone, speaking to Shalanda Young on the United States House of Representatives floor downplaying Republican concerns about tax rates, stated "So this Republican jigaboo that it's the tax rate that's stopping business investment, it's just completely faulty." Trone faced criticism and later apologized, stating that he had meant to use the word "bugaboo" instead of the racial slur, and ultimately lost the primary election to Angela Alsobrooks.
- In September 2024, at the Labour Party Conference, Prime Minister Keir Starmer called for "the return of the sausages" when talking about the Israeli hostages held in Gaza.
- Ford Motor Company executive Mike O'Brien kept a list of malapropisms he heard while working at the company, such as "let’s not reinvent the ocean", "read between the tea leaves", "I know it like the back of my head", and "he’s going to be so happy he’ll be like a canary in a coal mine!"

== See also ==
- Anti-proverb
- Catachresis
- Eggcorn
- Error (linguistics)
- Freudian slip
- Homonym
- Johnny Dangerously
- Leo Gorcey
- Mondegreen
- Mumpsimus
- Nearest and Dearest
- Norm Crosby
- Spoonerism
- Trailer Park Boys
