= Russian jokes =

Humorous subjects pertaining to Russian and Soviet culture

- Alternative name: Анекдоты (Russian)
- Languages: Russian; English

Russian jokes (Russian: анекдоты, romanized: anekdoty, lit. 'anecdotes') are short fictional stories or dialogs with a punch line, which commonly appear in Russian humor. Russian joke culture includes a series of categories with fixed settings and characters. Russian jokes treat topics found everywhere in the world, including sex, politics, spousal relations, or mothers-in-law. This article discusses Russian joke subjects that are particular to Russian or Soviet culture. A major subcategory is Russian political jokes, discussed in a separate article. Every category has numerous untranslatable jokes that rely on linguistic puns, wordplay, and the Russian language vocabulary of foul language. Below, (L) marks jokes whose humor value critically depends on intrinsic features of the Russian language.

== Archetypes ==
=== Named characters ===
==== Stierlitz ====
Stierlitz is a fictional Soviet intelligence officer, portrayed by Vyacheslav Tikhonov in the Soviet TV series Seventeen Moments of Spring. In the jokes, Stierlitz interacts with various characters, most prominently his nemesis Müller portrayed by Leonid Bronevoy. Usually two-liners spoofing the solemn style of the original TV voice-overs, the plot is resolved in grotesque plays on words or in parodies of the trains of thought and narrow escapes of the "original" Stierlitz.

- Stierlitz opens a door, and the lights go on. Stierlitz closes the door, and the lights go out. Stierlitz opens the door again; the light goes back on. Stierlitz closes the door; the light goes out again. Stierlitz deduces, "It's a refrigerator".
- Stierlitz approaches Berlin, which is veiled in smoke from widespread fires: "Must have forgotten to turn off my iron," Stierlitz thought with slight irritation.
- Stierlitz wakes up in a prison cell. "Which identity should I use?" he wonders. "Let's see. If a person in black uniform walks in, I must be in Germany so I'll say I'm Standartenführer Stierlitz. If they wear green uniform, I'm in the USSR so I'll admit I'm Colonel Isayev". The door opens and a person in a grey uniform comes in saying, "You really should ease up on vodka, Comrade Tikhonov!" (Grey uniform was the standard police officer's uniform in Soviet Union since early 1970s.)

==== Poruchik Rzhevsky ====
Poruchik Dmitry Rzhevsky of the jokes is a cavalry (Hussar) officer, a straightforward, unsophisticated, and innocently rude military type whose rank and standing nevertheless gain him entrance into high society. In the jokes, he is often seen interacting with the character Natasha Rostova from the novel War and Peace by Leo Tolstoy, who would act as his opposite, showing the comedic contrast between Rzhevsky and Rostova's behavior. The name is borrowed from a character in a musical comedy, Hussar Ballad (1962), having little in common with the folklore hero. The 1967 film rendering of War and Peace contributed to the proliferation of the Rzhevsky jokes. Some researchers point out that many jokes of this kind are versions of 19th-century Russian army jokes, retold as a new series of jokes about Rzhevsky.

Rzhevsky is often depicted as having a casual, nonchalant attitude to love and sex:

- Poruchik Rzhevsky is putting his riding boots on and is about to take leave of a charming demoiselle he had met the previous evening: "Mon cher Poruchik", she intones teasingly, "aren't you forgetting about the money?" Rzhevsky turns to her and says proudly: "Hussars never take money!" (The latter expression Gusary deneg ne berut! has become a Russian catchphrase.)

Rzhevsky is also seen giving advice to other Russian gentlemen:

- Knyaz Andrei Bolkonski asks Poruchik Rzhevsky: "Tell me, Poruchik, how did you come to be so good with the ladies? What is your secret?" / "It's quite simplement, mon Prince, quite simplement. I just come over and say: 'Madame, would you like to fuck?'" / "But Poruchik, you'll get slapped in the face for that!" / "Oui, most of them slap, but some of them fuck."

A series of jokes is based on a paradox of vulgarity within a high society setting:

- Natasha Rostova attends her first formal ball and dances with Pierre Bezukhov: "Pierre, isn't that grease on your collar?" / "Oh my, how could I miss such a terrible flaw in my costume, I'm totally destroyed!" [he retreats in shame] / Then, she dances with Kniaz Bolkonsky: "Andrew, isn't there a spot of sauce on your tunic?" [he faints] / Finally, she's dancing with Rzhevsky: "Poruchik, your boots are all covered in mud!" / "It's not mud, it's shit. Don't worry, mademoiselle, it'll fall off once it dries up."
- Poruchik Rzhevsky is dancing at a ball with a lady. He asks to be excused "to go out to check on the horse". When he returns his pants are all wet. "Poruchik, is it rainy outside?" Asks the lady. "No, m'd'mselle", Rzhevsky responds, "it's windy outside."

While successful narration of quite a few Russian jokes heavily depends on using sexual vulgarities ("Russian mat"), Rzhevsky, with all his vulgarity, does not use heavy mat in traditional versions of his tales. One of his favorite words is "arse" (which is considered rather mild among Russian vulgarities), and there is a series of jokes where Rzhevsky answers "arse" to some innocent question (it is typical of Rzhevsky to blurt unromantic comments in the most romantic situations):

- Poruchik Rzhevsky and Natasha Rostova are riding horses together on the countryside. "Poruchik, what a beautiful meadow! Guess what I see there?" / "Arse, mademoiselle?" / "Ouch, Poruchik! I see chamomiles!" (Chamomiles are Russian cliché folk flowers) / "How romantic, mademoiselle! An arse amid chamomiles!..."

The essence of Rzhevsky's peculiarity is captured in the following meta-joke:

- Rzhevsky narrates his latest adventure to his Hussar comrades. "...So I am riding through this dark wood and suddenly see a wide, white..." / Hussars, all together: "...arse!" / "Of course not! A glade full of chamomiles! And right in the middle there is a beautiful white..." / Hussars, encore: "...arse!" / "How vulgar of you! A mansion! So I open the door and guess what I see?" / Hussars, encore: "An arse!" / Poruchik, genuinely surprised: "How did you guess? Did I tell this story before?"

This theme culminates in the following joke, sometimes called "the ultimate Hussar joke":

- Countess Maria Bolkonskaya celebrates her 50th anniversary, the whole local Hussar regiment is invited, and the Countess boasts about the gifts she has received: "Cornet Obolensky presented me a lovely set of 50 Chinese fragrant candles. I loved them so much that I immediately stuck them into the seven 7-branch candlesticks you see on the table. Such auspicious numbers! Unfortunately there is a single candle left, and I don't know where to stick it..." / The whole Hussar regiment takes a deep breath... but the Hussar colonel barks out: "Hussars!!! Silence!!!" (Гусары, молчать! has become a catchphrase too.)

==== Rabinovich ====
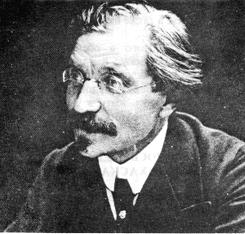
Sholem Aleichem, a famous Rabinovich known for humor in his novels

Rabinovich is a typical Russian Jewish surname of a protagonist of Jewish jokes in Soviet Union.

- Rabinovich fills out a job application form. The official is skeptical: "You stated that you don't have any relatives abroad, but you do have a brother in Israel." / "Yes, but he isn't abroad, I am abroad!"
- Seeing a pompous and lavish burial of a member of the Politburo, Rabinovich sadly shakes his head: "What a waste! With this kind of money, I could have buried the entire Politburo!"
- Rabinovich calls Pamyat headquarters, speaking with a characteristic accent: "Tell me, is it true that Jews sold out Russia?" / "Yes, of course it's true, you Kike-schnabel!" / "Oh good! Could you please tell me where I should go to get my share?"
- The census taker comes to the Rabinovich house: "Does Abram Rabinovich live here?" / "No" / "Well, then, comrade, what is your name?" / "Abram Rabinovich." / "Wait a minute-didn't you just tell me that Rabinovich doesn't live here?" / "Aha," "You call this living?"

The following example explains Vladimir Putin's remark about "Comrade Wolf", describing the policies of the United States, that many non-Russians found cryptic. In a reference to the US-led invasion of Iraq Putin said: "As they say, 'comrade wolf knows whom to eat.' He eats without listening and he is clearly not going to listen to anyone."

- Rabinovich is walking through the forest with a sheep, when both of them stumble into a pit. A few minutes later, a wolf also falls into the pit. The sheep gets nervous and starts bleating. Rabinovich says, "What's with all the baaahh, baaahh? Comrade Wolf knows whom to eat."

==== Vovochka ====
Vovochka is the Russian equivalent of "Little Johnny". He interacts with his school teacher, Maria Ivanovna (shortened to "Marivanna", a stereotypical female teacher's name). "Vovochka" is a diminutive form of "Vova", which in turn is a shortened version of "Vladimir", creating the "little boy" effect. His fellow students bear similarly diminutive names. This "little boy" name is used in contrast with Vovochka's wisecracking, adult, often obscene statements.

- In biology class, the teacher draws a cucumber on the blackboard: "Children, could someone tell me what is this?" / Vovochka raises his hand: "It's a dick, Marivanna!" The teacher bursts into tears and runs out. / Shortly, the principal rushes in: "All right, what did you do now? Which one of you brought Maria Ivanovna to tears? And who the hell drew that dick on the blackboard?"
- The teacher asks the class to produce a word that starts with the letter "A": Vovochka happily raises his hand and says "Arse!" ("Жопа" in the original) / The teacher, shocked, responds "For shame! There's no such word!" / "That's strange," says Vovochka thoughtfully, "the arse exists, but the word doesn't!" (The last phrase is attributed to Ivan Baudouin de Courtenay, linguist and lexicographer.)
- After March 26, all jokes about Vovochka are considered political. (In reference to elections of Vladimir Putin as President of Russia).

==== Vasily Ivanovich ====
Vasily Ivanovich Chapayev

Vasily Ivanovich Chapayev, a Red Army hero of the Russian Civil War, in the rank of Division Commander, was featured in a 1934 biopic. The most common topics are the war with the monarchist White Army, Chapayev's futile attempts to enroll into the Frunze Military Academy, and the circumstances of Chapayev's death (officially, he was gunned down by the Whites and drowned while attempting to flee across the Ural River after a lost battle).

Chapayev is usually accompanied by his aide-de-camp Petka (Петька, "Pete"), as well as Anka the Machine-Gunner (Анка-пулемётчица), and political commissar Furmanov, all based on real people. (Being well known in Russian popular culture, Chapayev, Petka, and Anka were featured in a series of Russian adventure games released in the late 1990s and 2000s.)

- "I flunked my history exam, Petka. They asked me who Caesar was, and I said he's a stallion from our 7th cavalry squadron." / "It's all my fault, Vasily Ivanovich! While you were away, I reassigned him to the 6th!"
- Chapayev, Petka, and Anka, in hiding from the Whites, are crawling plastoon-style across a field: Anka first, then Petka, and Chapayev is last. / Petka says to Anka, "Anka, you lied about your proletarian descent! Your mother must have been a ballerina – your legs are so fine!" / Chapayev responds, "And your father, Petka, must have been a plowman – the furrow you're leaving behind you is so deep!"
- On the occasion of an anniversary of the October Revolution, Furmanov gives a political lecture to the rank and file soldiers: "...And now we are on our glorious way to the shining horizons of Communism!" / "How did it go?", Chapayev asks Petka afterwards. "Exciting!... but unclear. What the hell is a horizon?" / "See Petka, it is a line you may see far away in the steppe when the weather is good. And it's a tricky one – no matter how long you ride towards it, you'll never reach it. You'll only wear down your horse."
- See also under Fantômas below.

==== Sherlock Holmes and Dr Watson ====
A number of jokes involve characters from the short stories by Sir Arthur Conan Doyle about the private detective Sherlock Holmes and his friend Doctor Watson. The jokes appeared and became popular soon after The Adventures of Sherlock Holmes and Dr. Watson film series was broadcast on Soviet TV in the late 1970s to mid-1980s, starring Vasily Livanov as Sherlock Holmes and Vitaly Solomin as Watson. Lines from these films are usually included in the jokes («Элементарно, Ватсон!» – "Elementary, my dear Watson!"). The narrator of the joke usually tries to mimic Livanov's husky voice. The standard plot of these jokes is a short dialog where Watson naïvely wonders about something, and Holmes finds a "logical" explanation to the phenomenon in question. Occasionally the jokes also include other characters – Mrs Hudson, the landlady of Holmes's residence on Baker Street; or Sir Henry and his butler Barrymore from The Hound of the Baskervilles; or the detective's nemesis Professor Moriarty.

- Sherlock Holmes and Dr Watson go on a camping trip. They pitch their tent under the stars and go to sleep. Sometime in the middle of the night, Holmes wakes Watson up and says: "Watson, look up, and tell me what you see." / "I see millions and millions of stars." / "And what do you deduce from that?" / "Well, if there are millions of stars, and if even a few of those have planets, it's quite likely there are some planets like Earth out there. And if there are a few planets like Earth out there, there might also be life." / "Watson, you idiot, it means that somebody stole our tent!"

==== Fantômas ====
Some older jokes involve Fantômas, a fictional criminal and master of disguise from the French detective series, a character once widely popular in the USSR. His arch-enemy is Inspector Juve, charged with catching him. Fantômas' talent for disguise is usually the focus of the joke, allowing for jokes featuring all sorts of other characters:

- From the days when Prime Minister Golda Meir led Israel: Fantômas sneaks into Mao Zedong's private chamber as the latter is on his deathbed, and respectfully removes his mask. / Mao muses: "Well, Comrade Petka, fate sure does have a way of scattering friends all over the world, doesn't it?" / "Ah, if you only knew, Vasily Ivanovich, what our Anka has been up to in Israel!"

==== Bogatyrs ====
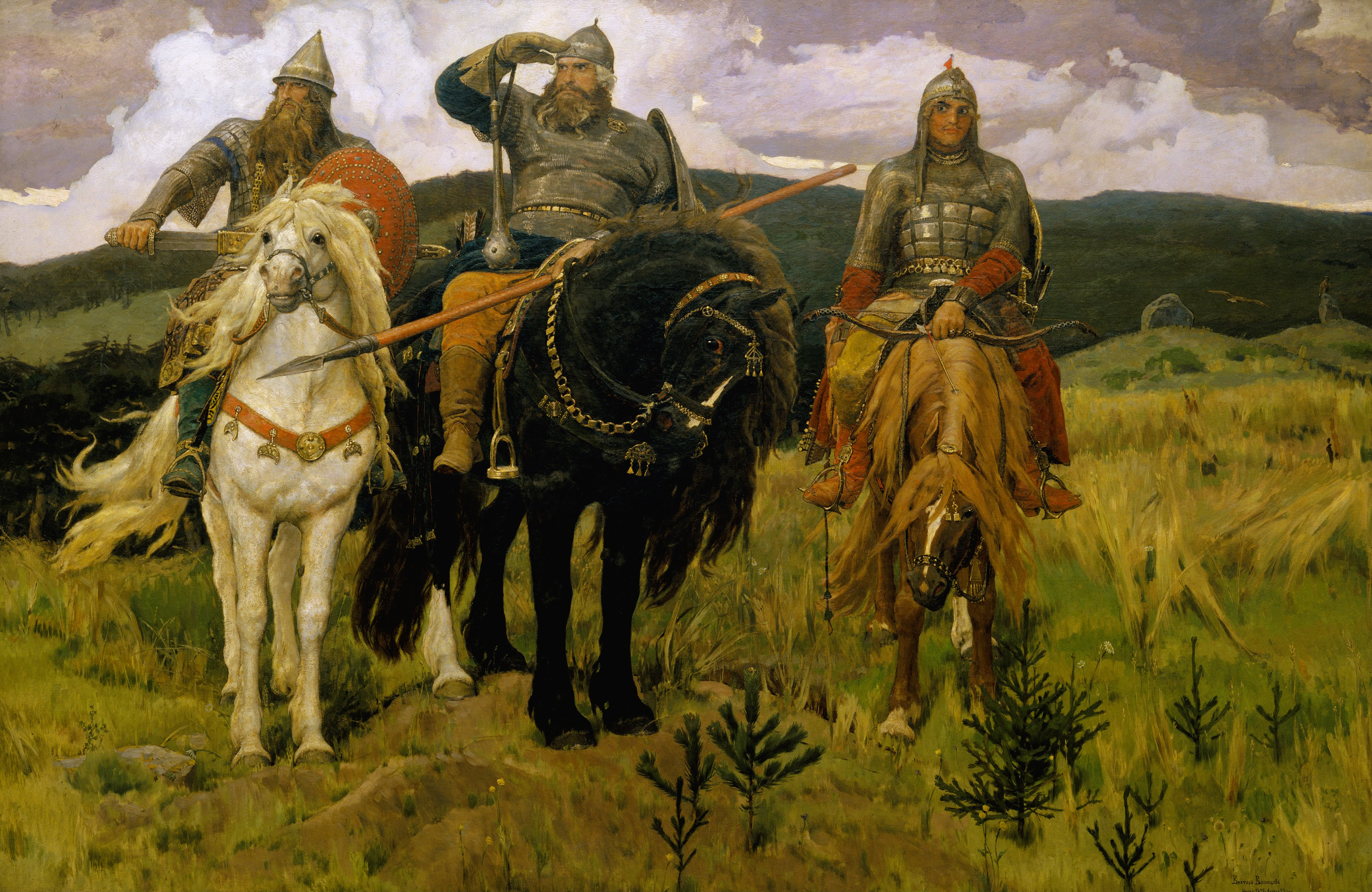
Three of the most famous bogatyrs, Dobrynya Nikitich, Ilya Muromets and Alyosha Popovich, appear together in Victor Vasnetsov's 1898 painting Bogatyrs.

Bogatyrs are heroes of Russian folk tales: impossibly strong and brave warriors, but often portrayed in jokes as arrogant, cunning and cruel. The three bogatyrs are usually Ilya Muromets, Alyosha Popovich, Dobrynya Nikitich or a combination thereof; the jokes often include other folk characters (such as Baba Yaga, Koschei or Gorynych) and enemies of Rus (most often the Golden Horde), usually defeated by the end of the joke. As with most other jokes, most of these are not meant for children despite folk characters associated with kids' fairy tales.

- Three bogatyrs clash with the Three Musketeers over a petty dispute; of course, d'Artagnan challenges Ilya to a duel. Aramis, as d'Artagnan's second, marks Ilya's heart with a chalk: "It is here that my friend chevalier d'Artagnan will have the honour to pierce you with his épée!". Ilya looks at his mace, then at d'Artagnan, then says to Alyosha Popovich: "Alyosha, be kind, dust this chevalier with chalk from head to toe."
- The steppe army approaches the border of Rus' and sees the outpost hut. The military leader shouts: "Russians, come out!" A sleepy Dobrynya Nikitich comes out of the hut: "What do you need?" — "We have come to conquer you!" — "And how many are you?" — "We are thousands of thousands!" Dobrynya, bewildered: "Good grief, who is going to bury such a crowd?!"

==== Armenian Radio ====
A large number of Russian jokes begin with the words "The Armenian Radio was asked a question..." The answer from the Armenian Radio always turns out to be unexpected and discouraging.

=== Animals ===
Jokes set in the animal kingdom also feature characters rooted in old Slavic fairy tales, where animals are portrayed as sapient beings with a stereotypical behavior, such as the violent Wolf; the sneaky Fox; the cocky, cowardly Hare; the strong, simple-minded Bear; the multi-dimensional Hedgehog; and the Lion, king of the animal kingdom. In the Russian language all objects, animate and inanimate, have a (grammatical) gender – masculine, feminine, or neuter. The reader should assume that the Wolf, the Bear, the Hare, the Lion, and the Hedgehog are males, whereas the Fox (Vixen) is a female:

- The Bear, the Wolf and the Vixen are playing cards. The Wolf warns, shuffling: "No cheating! If anyone is cheating, her smug red-furred face is going to hurt!"

Animals in Russian jokes are and were very well aware of politics in the realm of humans:

- A bunch of animals including the Cock are in prison bragging about why they were sent there. The Cock doesn't take part in this. Someone asks: "And what are you in for?" / "I am not talking to you, criminals. I am a political prisoner!" / "How come?" / "I pecked a Young Pioneer in the arse!"

Animal jokes are often fables, i.e. their punchline is (or eventually becomes) a kind of a maxim.

- The Hare runs like crazy through a forest and meets the Wolf. The Wolf asks: "What's the matter? Why such haste?" / "The camels there are caught and shod!" The Wolf says: "But you're not a camel!" / "Hey, after you are caught and shod, just you try to prove to them that you are not a camel!"

This joke is suggested to be an origin of the popular Russian saying "try to prove you are not a camel" in the sense "try to prove something to someone who doesn't want to listen", used in relation to violations of the presumption of innocence by Russian law enforcement agencies, or when someone has to fight the bureaucracy to get official papers proving that one has lost a leg or is even alive. The Hare and the joke itself were used to illustrate the hassles of a Soviet lishenets in a 1929 issue of a satirical magazine Chudak. Mikhail Melnichenko, in an article about Soviet political jokes, cites a 1926 private collection, which renders the joke in a more gruesome form, where the Hare is scared of the rumor that all camels are taken hostages by Cheka and shot (a reference to the Red Terror). Later Melnichenko in his book Coветский анекдот. Указатель сюжетов reports an earlier version, a record of a censored sketch of the comic duo Bim Bom. A similar parable was told by a 13th-century Persian poet and Sufi Jalal ad-Din Rumi, in which a person was scared to be taken for a donkey and skinned. Ben Lewis in his "Hammer & Tickle" cites yet another version: a flock of sheep seek refuge in Finland because Beria ordered an arrest of all elephants (an allusion to the sweeping national operations of the NKVD) and they have no chance to explain the difference to Beria. Lewis traces it to "a Persian poet in 12th-century Arabia, where it involves a fox running away from a royal ordinance that in theory applies only to donkeys."

==== Golden Fish ====
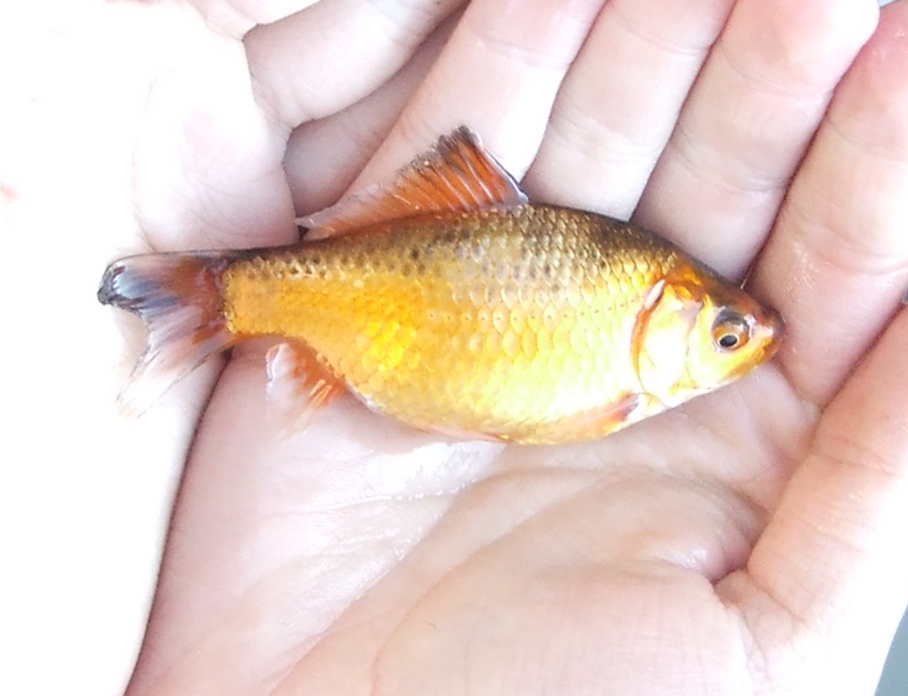

Aside from mammals, a rather common non-human is the "Golden Fish", who asks the catcher to release her in exchange for three wishes. The first Russian instance of this appeared in Alexander Pushkin's The Tale of the Fisherman and the Fish. In jokes, the Fisherman may be replaced by a representative of a nationality or ethnicity, and the third wish usually makes the punch line of the joke.

- An American, a Frenchman and a Russian are alone on an uninhabited island. They catch fish for food and suddenly catch a Golden Fish, who promises to fulfill two wishes for each in trade for her own freedom:
  The American: "A million dollars and to go back home!"
  The Frenchman: "Three beautiful women and to go back home!"
  The Russian: "Tsk, and we were getting along so well. Three crates of vodka and the two fellas back!"
  - Side Note: This joke is a play on the fact that in Russia it is believed that three is the optimal number of people for drinking. This in turn goes back to when in the Soviet Union a bottle of vodka cost 2.87 roubles, 3 roubles being a convenient price for three men to buy a bottle and have 13 kopecks left for a snack. The classic for the latter was a rectangular pack of soft processed cheese "Druzhba" (Friendship), with that exact price. Therefore, a natural company is 3, each contributing 1 rouble. This procedure was dubbed "to have arranged for three (persons)" (Russian: сообразить на троих; soobrazit' na troikh, literal translation: "to have figured out for three"). Much of Soviet folklore is based on this interpretation of the "magic of the number 3".

A similar type of joke involves a wish-granting Genie, the main difference being that in the case of the Golden Fish the Fisherman suffers from his own stupidity or greed, while the Genie is known for ingeniously twisting an interpretation of the wish to frustrate the grantee.

- A man finds an old bottle, picks it up and opens it. The Genie comes out of the bottle and says: "Thanks so much for letting me out! I feel I should do something for you, too. Would you like to become a Hero of the Soviet Union?" (Hero of the Soviet Union was the highest Soviet award). The guy says: "Yes, sure!" Next thing he knows, he finds himself on a battlefield with four grenades, alone against six German panzers.

=== Drunkards ===
- A drunkard takes a leak by a lamp pole in the street. A policeman tries to reason with him: "Can't you see the latrine is just 25 feet away?" The drunkard replies: "Do you think I've got a fire hose in my trousers?"
- Drunk #1 is slowly walking, bracing himself against a fence and stumbling. He comes across Drunk #2, who is lying in mud across the street. "What a disgrace! Lying around like a pig! I'm ashamed for you." / "You just keep on walking, demagogue! We'll see what you're gonna do when you run out of your fence too!"
- During the anti-alcohol campaign two drunkards agreed on a special code: "book" means "vodka", "newspaper" means "beer", etc. So, this is how their chat goes: "Shit, newspapers are out of stock since early morning, the library opens only at 11am..." The second one cuts in: "To hell with the books, come over quickly: uncle Ivan brought some manuscripts from the village!"

=== Policemen ===
These often revolve around the supposition that the vast majority of Russian and Soviet militsioners (policemen, now called politzia) accept bribes. Also, they are not considered to be very bright.

- Three prizes were awarded for the successes in a Socialist competition of the Traffic Inspection Department #18. The third prize is the Complete Works of Vladimir Lenin. The second prize is 100 roubles and a ticket to Sochi... The first prize is a portable stop sign. (There are several versions with this punch line about the stop sign, which is a Soviet peculiarity. A portable stop sign allowed the militsioner to put it in an unexpected or hard-to-see place on a road, to fine everyone passing it, and to appropriate most of the fines for himself. One such joke: The policeman asked his supervisor for a raise and got the reply, "I cannot give you a raise, but I can give you a stop sign.")
- A person on a bus tells a joke: "Do you know why policemen always go in pairs?" / "No, why?" / "It's specialization: one knows how to read, the other knows how to write." / A hand promptly grabs him by the shoulder – a policeman is standing right behind him! / "Your papers!" he barks. The hapless person surrenders his official papers. / The policeman opens them, reads, and nods to his partner: "Write him a citation for slandering the Soviet Militsiya, Vasya". (A version of this joke involves a third policeman whose sole job is in turn to watch over these two dangerously literate intellectuals.)

=== Ethnic stereotypes ===
Imperial Russia had been multi-ethnic for many centuries, and this situation continued throughout the Soviet period, and continues still. Throughout history, several ethnic stereotypes have developed, often in common with those views by other ethnicities (usually except for the ethnicity in question, but not always).

==== Chukchi ====
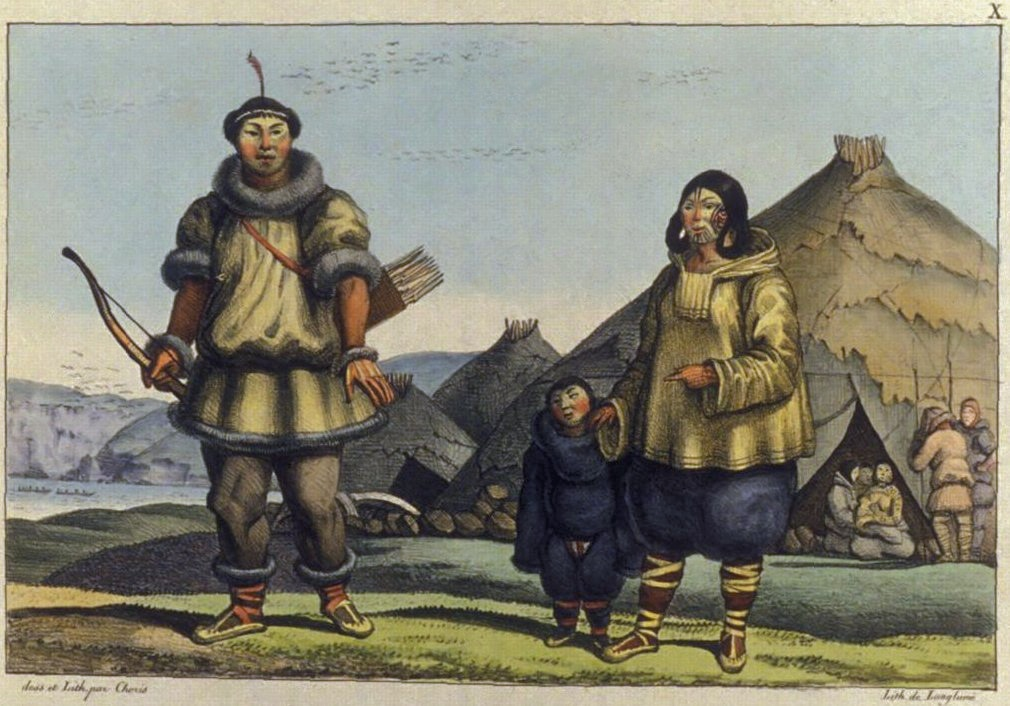

Chukchi (singular Chukcha), the native people of Chukotka, the most remote northeast corner of Russia, are a common minority targeted for generic ethnic jokes in Russia. They are depicted as primitive, uncivilized, and simple-minded, but clever in their own way. A propensity for saying odnako (Russian for "however", depending on context) is a staple of Chukcha jokes. The straight man part of Chukcha jokes is often a Russian geologist.

- "Chukcha, why did you buy a fridge, if it's so cold on the tundra?" "Why, is −50° Celsius outside yaranga, is −10° inside, is −5° in fridge – warm place, odnako!"
- A Chukcha comes into a shop and asks: "Do you have color TVs?" "Yes, we do." "Give me a green one."
- A Chukcha applies for membership in the Union of Soviet Writers. He is asked what literature he is familiar with. "Have you read Pushkin?" "No." "Have you read Dostoevsky?" "No." "Can you read at all?" The Chukcha, offended, replies, "Chukcha not reader, Chukcha writer!" (The last phrase has become a cliché in Russian culture, hinting at happy or militant ignorance.)

Chukchi do not miss their chance to offer a retort.

- A Chukcha and a Russian geologist go hunting polar bears. They eventually track one down. Seeing the bear, the Chukcha shouts, "Run!" and flees. The Russian shrugs, calmly raises his gun, and shoots the bear. "Russian hunter, bad hunter!", the Chukcha exclaims. "Ten kilometres to the yaranga, you haul this bear yourself!"

Chukchi, due to their innocence, often see the inner truth of situations.

- A Chukcha returning home from Moscow is met with great excitement and interest from his friends. "What is socialism like?" "Oh," begins the Chukcha in awe, "There, everything is for the betterment of man... I even saw that man himself!" (This references the Communist slogan Всё для блага человека!, "Everything for the betterment of man." The "man himself" is usually interpreted as either Lenin in the Mausoleum or whoever was the general secretary at the time, depending on when and where the joke was told.)

==== Ukrainians ====
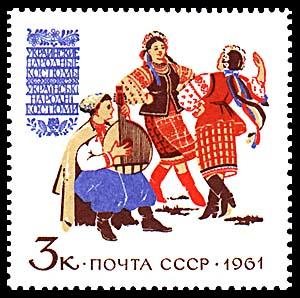

Ukrainians are depicted as rustic, stingy, and inordinately fond of salted salo (pork back fat); their accent, which is imitated, is perceived as funny.

- A Ukrainian tourist is questioned at international customs: "Are you carrying any weapons or drugs?" "What are drugs?" "They make you get high." "Yes, salo." "But salo is not a drug." "When I eat salo, I get high!"
- A Ukrainian is asked, "Can you eat a kilo of apples?" "Yes, I can." "Can you eat two kilos of apples?" "I can." "And five kilos?" "I can." "Can you eat 100 kilos?!" "What I cannot eat, I will nibble!"

Ukrainians are perceived as having a grudge against Russians (derided as Moskali by Ukrainians).

- The Soviet Union has launched the first man into space. A Hutsul shepherd, standing on top of a hill, shouts over to another shepherd on another hill to tell him the news. "Mykola!" "Yes!" "The moskali have flown to space!" "All of them?" "No, just one." "So why are you bothering me, then?"

==== Georgians ====
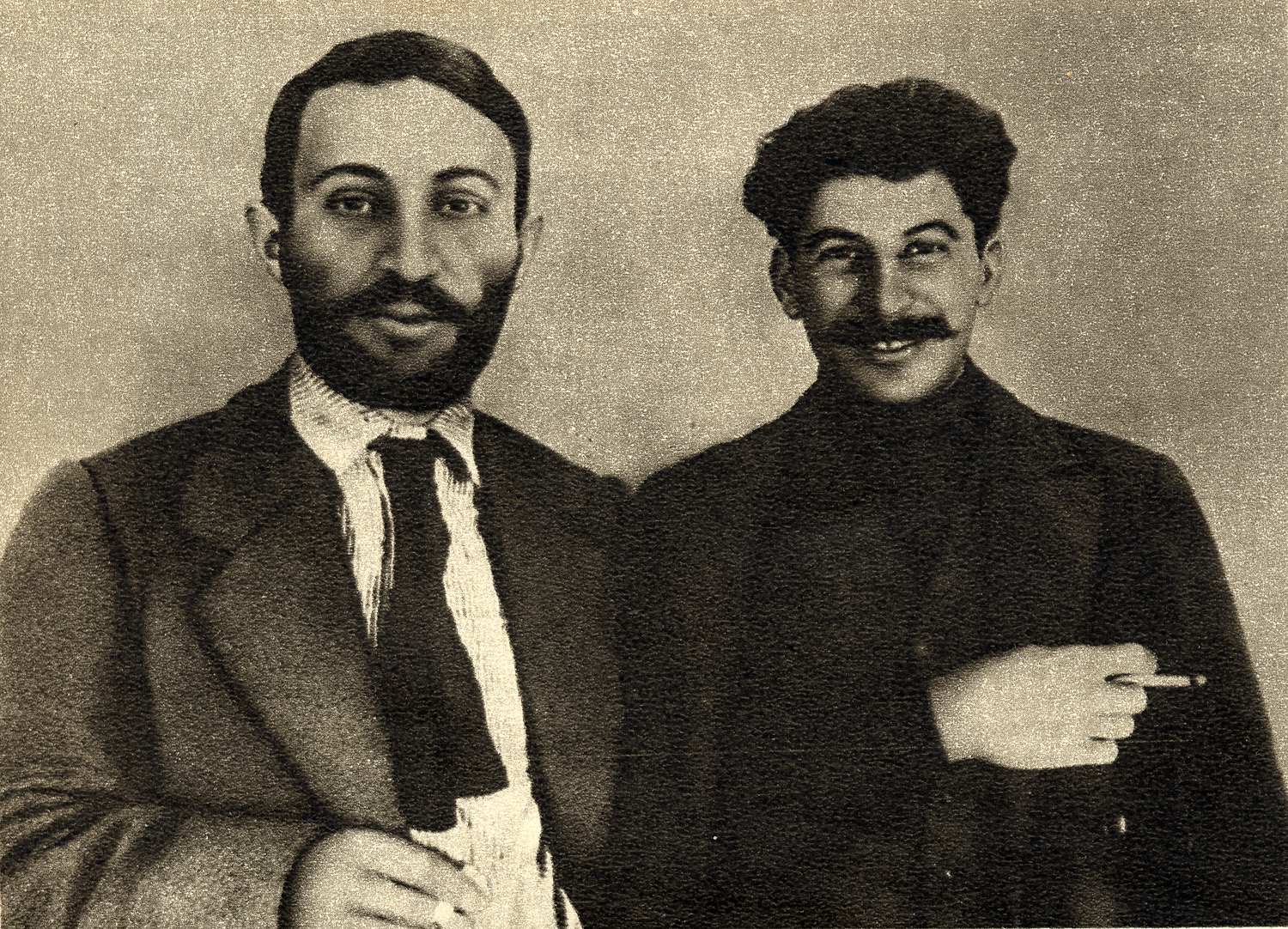
Armenian Suren Spandaryan (left) and Georgian Joseph Stalin in 1915

Georgians are usually depicted as stupid, greedy, hot-blooded, or addicted to sex and sometimes all four. A very loud and theatrical Georgian accent, including grammatical errors considered typical of Georgians, and occasional Georgian words are considered funny to imitate in Russian and often becomes a joke in itself.

In some jokes, Georgians are portrayed as rich, because in Soviet times they were also perceived as profiting from black market businesses. There is a humorous expression deriving from the custom in police reports of referring to them as "persons of Caucasian ethnicity" (Russian: лицо кавказской национальности). Since the Russian word for "person" in the formal sense, (Russian: лицо), is the same as the word for "face", this allows a play on words about "faces of Caucasian ethnicity". In Russia itself, most people see "persons of Caucasian ethnicity" mostly at marketplaces selling fruits and flowers. Later on, many old jokes about rich Georgians were being recast in terms of "New Russians".

- A plane takes off from the Tbilisi airport. A passenger storms the pilot's cabin, waving an AK-47 rifle and demanding that the flight be diverted to Israel. The pilot shrugs in agreement, but suddenly the hijacker's head falls off his shoulders, and a Georgian pops from behind with a blood-drenched dagger, and a huge suitcase: "Lisss'n here genatsvale: No any Israel-Misrael. Fly Moscow nonstop – my roses are wilting!"
- In a zoo, two girls are discussing a gorilla with a huge penis."That's what a real man must have!" A Georgian passer-by remarks, sardonically, "You are badly mistaken, it's not a man, it is a male. This is what a real man must have!" He produces a thick wallet.

==== Estonians and Finns ====
Estonians and Finns are depicted as humorless, stubborn, taciturn, and slow. The Estonian accent, especially its sing-song tune and the lack of genders in grammar, forms part of the humor. The Estonian common usage of long vowels and consonants both in speech and orthography (e.g. words such as Tallinn, Saaremaa) also led to the stereotype of being slow in speech, thinking, and action. In the everyday life, a person may be derisively called a "hot-headed Estonian fellow" (or in similar spirit, a "hot-tempered Finnish bloke", a phrase popularized by the 1995 Russian comedy Peculiarities of the National Hunt) to emphasize tardiness or lack of temperament. Indeed, Estonians play a similar role in Soviet humor to that of Finns in Scandinavian jokes.

Finnish political scientist Ilmari Susiluoto, also an author of three books on Russian humor, writes that Finns and Russians understand each other's humor. "Being included in a Russian anecdote is a privilege that Danes or Dutchmen have not attained. These nations are too boring and unvaried to rise into the consciousness of a large country. But the funny and slightly silly, stubborn Finns, the Chukhnas do."

- An Estonian stands by a railway track. Another Estonian passes by on a handcar, pushing the pump up and down. The first one asks, "Iis iitt a llonngg wwayy ttoo Ttallinn?" "Nnoot ttoo llonngg." He gets on the car and joins pushing the pump up and down. After two hours of silent pumping the first Estonian asks again: "Iis iitt a llonngg wwayy ttoo Ttallinn?""Nnnoooowww iiitt iiiis llonngg wwayy."
- "I told some Estonian blokes that they're slow." "What did they reply?" "Nothing, but they beat me up the following day."
- A Finnish family – the parents and two brothers – take car into countryside. An animal crosses the road in front of the car and runs away into the forest. An hour later one brother says, "It is a fox!" Two hours later, the second brother says: "No, it is a wolf!" Three hours later, the father replies: "Well, why don't you have a fight, you hot-headed Finnish guys!"
- Two Finns are sitting near a road. Suddenly, a car passes in a blur. Half an hour later, one Finn asks: "Whaaat waaaaas thaaaat?" Half an hour after that, the other replies: "Thaaaat waaaas Miiiiiiiikaaaa Häaaaaakkiiiiiiineeeeeen, the shaaaame of the Fiiiiinniiish naaaaation"

Finns share with Chukchi their ability to withstand cold.

- At −10 °C, the heat is switched on in British homes, while Finns change into a long-sleeved shirt. At −20°, Austrians fly to Málaga, while Finns celebrate midsummer. At −200°, hell freezes over and Finland wins the Eurovision Song Contest. (This joke predates the event, previously deemed impossible, of Finland winning the contest, which happened in 2006.) At −273°, absolute zero temperature is reached, and all atomic movement ceases. The Finns shrug and say: "Perkele, a bit chilly today, isn't it?".

==== Jews ====
Jewish humor is a highly developed subset of Russian humor, largely based on the self-image of Russian Jews. The Jewish self-deprecating anecdotes are not the same as anti-Semitic jokes. Instead, whether told by Jews or non-Jewish Russians, these jokes show cynicism, self-irony, and wit that is characteristic of Jewish humor both in Russia and elsewhere in the world (see Jewish humor). The jokes are usually told with a characteristic Jewish accent (stretching out syllables, parodying the uvular trill of "R", etc.) and some peculiarities of sentence structure calqued into Russian from Yiddish. Many of these jokes are set in Odesa, and to some extent the phrase "Odesa humor" is synonymous with "Jewish jokes," even if the characters don't have Jewish names and even their religion/ethnicity is never mentioned.

- Abram cannot sleep, tossing and turning from side to side... Finally his wife Sarah inquires: "Abram, what's bothering you?" "I owe Moishe 20 roubles, but I have no money. What shall I do?" Sarah bangs on the flimsy wall and shouts to the neighbors: "Moishe! My Abram still owes you 20 roubles? Well he isn't giving them back!" Turning to her husband, she says reassuringly: "Now go to sleep and let Moishe stay awake!"
- An Odesa Jew meets another one. "Have you heard, Einstein has won the Nobel Prize?" "Oy, what for?" "He developed this relativity theory." "Yeah, what's that?" "Well, you know, five hairs on your head is relatively few. Five hairs in your soup is relatively many." "And for that he gets the Nobel Prize?!"
- A Red Guardsman pounds on Abram's door. / He answers through the door: "Yes?" / "Abram, we've come for everything precious." Abram thinks for a moment, and calls out, "Rosa, my precious, someone's here for you!"

During the 1967 Arab–Israeli War sympathies of the ordinary Soviet people were on the side of Israel despite Egypt under Nasser being officially a Soviet ally, "on the Socialist path of development".

- A quiet time at the Egypt-Israel frontline. A Jew shouts, "Hey, Abdullah!" A head pops up. "What do you want?" — and catches a bullet. Now an Egyptian shouts, "Hey, Abraham!" — "Who asked Abraham?" A head pops up. "It's me, Abdullah!" — and catches a bullet.

The above joke is in part based on the common stereotype about Jews that they answer a question with a question.

==== Chinese ====
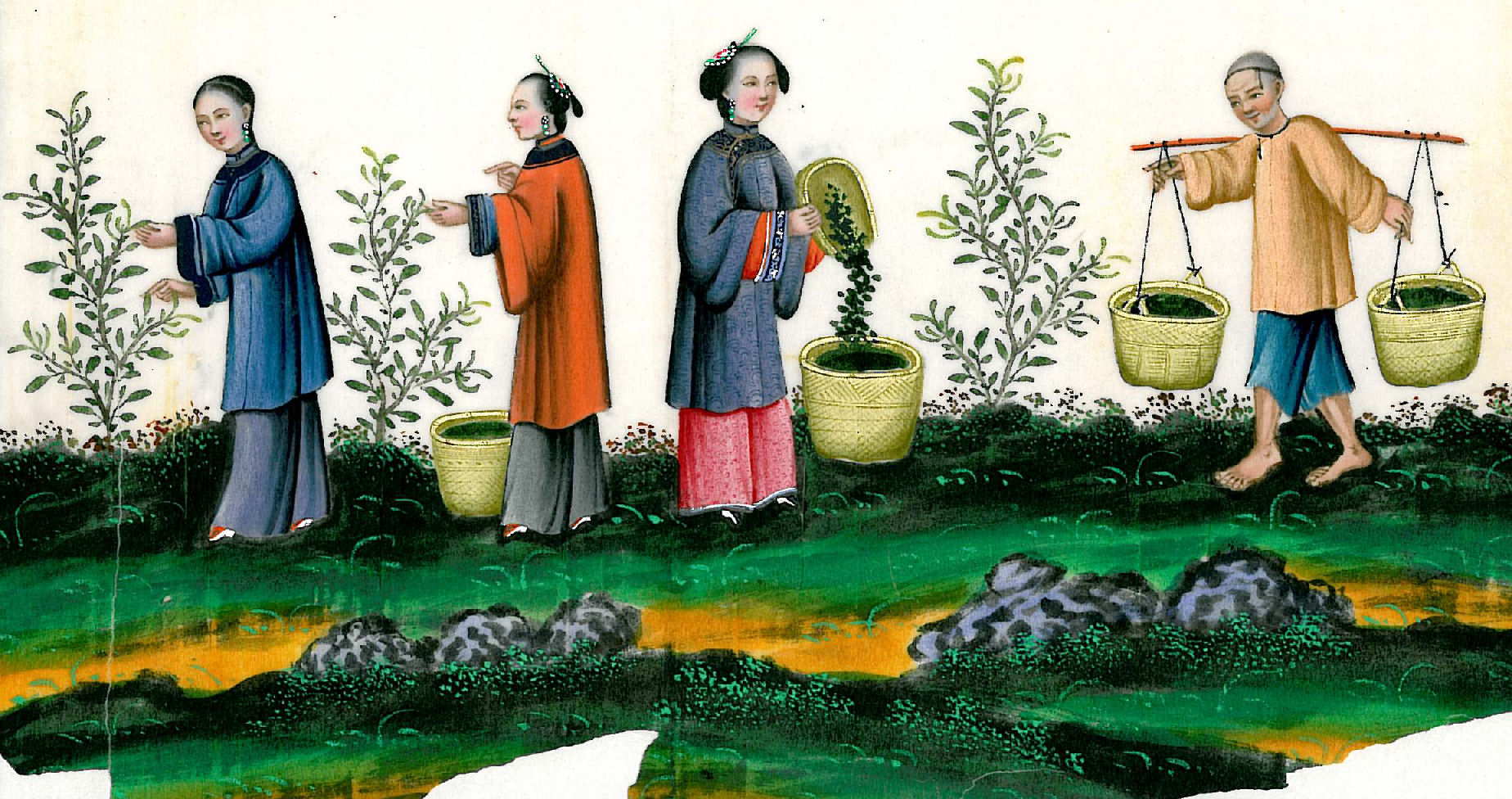

Common jokes center on the enormous size of the Chinese population, the Chinese language and the perceptions of the Chinese as cunning, industrious, and hard-working. Other jokes revolve around the belief that the Chinese are capable of amazing feats by primitive means, such as the Great Leap Forward.

- "During the Damansky Island incident the Chinese military developed three main strategies: The Great Offensive, The Small Retreat, and Infiltration by Small Groups of One to Two Million Across the Border".
- In another joke of that time: "How will the war between the USSR and China end? With the unconditional surrender of the USSR after it has taken 400 million Chinese as prisoners of war".
- When a child is born in a wealthy Chinese family, there is an ancient tradition: a silver spoon is dropped onto the jade floor. The sound the spoon makes will be the name of the newborn. (see Chinese names)
- The initial report on the first Chinese human spaceflight: "All systems operational, boiler-men on duty!"

A good many of the jokes are puns based on the fact that a widespread Chinese syllable (written as hui in pinyin) looks very similar to the obscene Russian word for penis. For this reason, since about 1956 the Russian-Chinese dictionaries render the Russian transcription of this syllable as "хуэй" (huey) (which actually is closer to the correct Standard Chinese pronunciation). The most embarrassing case for the Chinese-Soviet friendship probably is the word "socialism" (社会主义; pinyin: shè huì zhǔ yì), rendered previously as шэ-хуй-чжу-и. The following humorous possibilities for the misunderstanding of the Chinese syllable hui are derived from Aarons's (2012) text:

- A new Chinese ambassador is to meet Gromyko. When the latter enters, the Chinese presents himself: "Zhui Hui!" Gromyko, unperturbed, retorts "Zhui sam!" The surprised Chinese asks: "And where is Gromyko?" (The pun is that zhui hui (a mock Chinese name) means "chew a dick" in Russian and zhui sam means "chew [it] yourself").
- Сунь Хуй в Чай Вынь Пей Сам, Sun' Huy v Chay Vyn' Pey Sam, (literally meaning "Dip [your] penis into tea, withdraw [and] drink [it], yourself") is a made-up "Chinese name" that is analogous to the English "Who Flung Dung". A suitable English interpretation sounds like "Dip Dick Tea, Back, You Drink". There is another variation of this joke about two Chinese persons: Сунь Хуй в Чай (Sun' Huy v Chay) and Вынь Су Хим (Vyn' Su Him), which can be translated as "Dip [your] penis into tea", and "Take [it] out dry", where a word "сухим" (suhim, meaning "dry") is divided into two syllables "су" (su) and "хим" (him).
- A subset of name-based jokes use the reverse, implying direct Soviet participation in Korean war. Usually "Chinese" pilot Lee See Tsyng is mentioned, being an easily recognizable Russian family name Лисицын (Lisitsyn, from Лисица – "vixen" in Russian). Some versions also include pilots Ku Ree Tsyng, See Nee Tsyng, and Tu Pee Tsyng. These are respectively Курицын, from курица ("hen"), Синицын (синица, "titmouse"), and Тупицын (тупица, "dumb one").

==== Russians ====
Russians are a stereotype in Russian jokes themselves when set next to other stereotyped ethnicities. Thus, the Russian appearing in a triple joke with two Westerners, German, French, American or Englishman, will provide for a self-ironic punchline depicting himself as simple-minded and negligently careless but physically robust, which often ensures that he retains the upper hand over his less naive Western counterparts. Another common plot is a Russian participating in a contest with technologically-superior opponents (usually, an American and a German or a Japanese) and winning with sheer brute force or a clever trick.

- A Frenchman, a German, and a Russian go on a safari and are captured by cannibals. They are brought to the chief, who says, "We are going to eat you right now. But I am a civilized man, I studied human rights at the Patrice Lumumba University in Moscow, so I'll grant each of you a last request." The German asks for a mug of beer and a bratwurst. He gets it, and then the cannibals eat him. The Frenchman asks for three girls. He has crazy sex with them, and then suffers the fate of the German. The Russian demands: "Hit me hard, right on my nose!" The chief is surprised, but hits him. The Russian pulls out a Kalashnikov and shoots all the cannibals. The mortally wounded chief asks him: "Why didn't you do this before we ate the German?" The Russian proudly replies: "Russians are not aggressors!" (This joke has also been used as a Jewish joke; more specifically, as an Israeli joke, alluding to Israel's being constantly afraid of being seen as the "aggressor".)
- A Chukcha sits on the shore of the Bering Strait. An American submarine surfaces. The American captain opens the hatch and asks: "Which way is Alaska?" The Chukcha points his finger: "That way!" / "Thanks!" says the American, shouts "South-South-East, bearing 159.5 degrees!" down the hatch and the submarine submerges. Ten minutes later, a Soviet submarine emerges. The Russian captain opens the hatch and asks the Chukcha: "Where did the American submarine go?" The Chukcha replies: "South-South-East bearing 159.5 degrees!" "Don't be a smart-ass", says the captain, "just point your finger!"
- A Frenchman, a Japanese, and a Russian are captured by an alien. He locks them in cells and demands that they amaze him using three steel balls – the winner will be released, the others will be executed. A week later, the Frenchman demonstrates a juggling trick with the balls. The Japanese has created a rock garden. However the Russian is declared winner: he broke one ball, and lost another two.

== Jokes from "vicious nineties" ==
"Vicious 90s" (the wild nineties) refers to the period of transition from communism to "jungle capitalism" in the history of Russia, characterized by the rise of Russian oligarchs, New Russians accompanied with the growing poverty of common people and banditism.

- Will your bank give a loan for my word of honor?"

"No problem..."
"And what if I don't return it?"
"Then you will be ashamed when you appear before the Almighty."
"But that’s far in the future, right?"
"If you don’t return it on the fifth, on the sixth you will meet Him."

- In the cloakroom of a theatre: "Would you like binoculars?" – "No, thanks, I have a laser sight."

=== New Russians ===
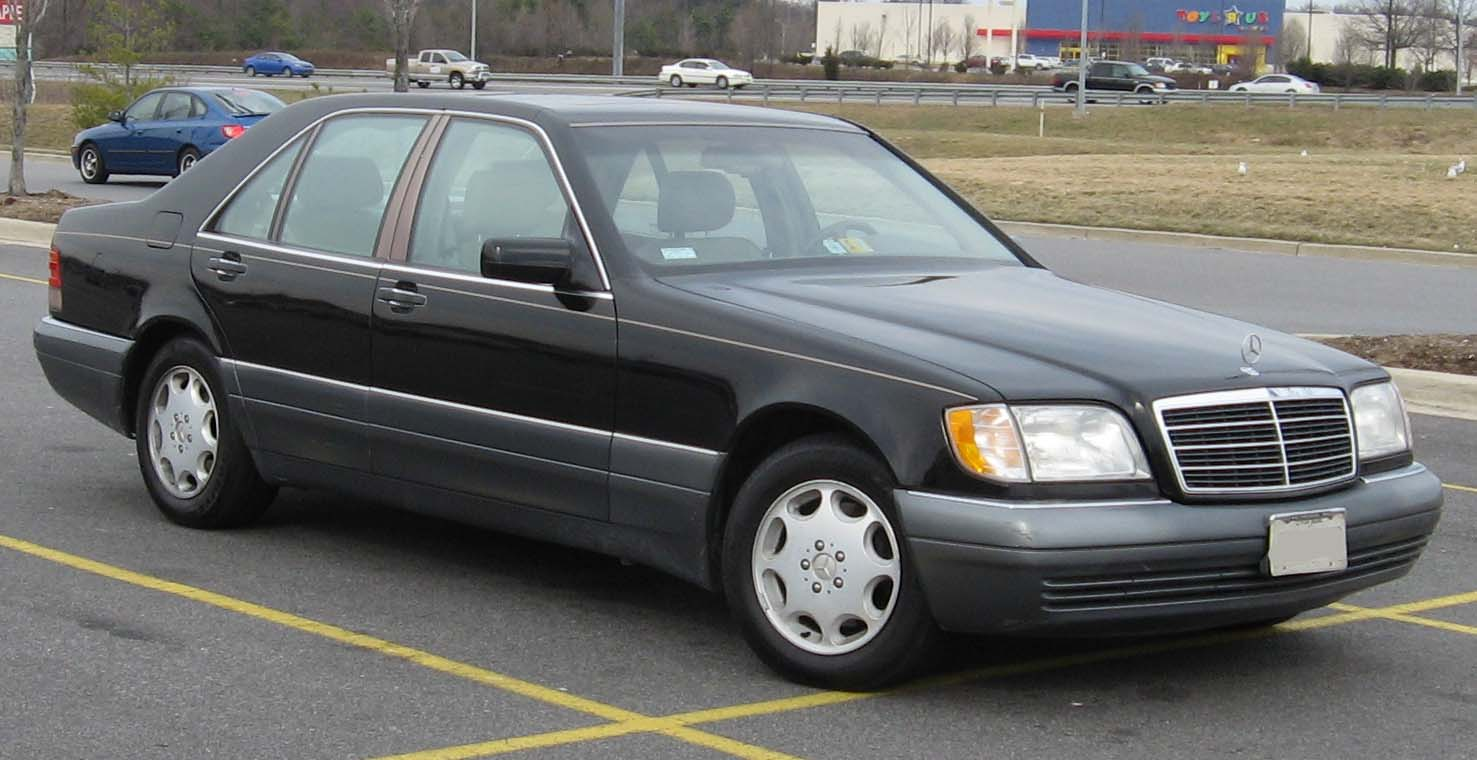
Mercedes-Benz S600 (W140)

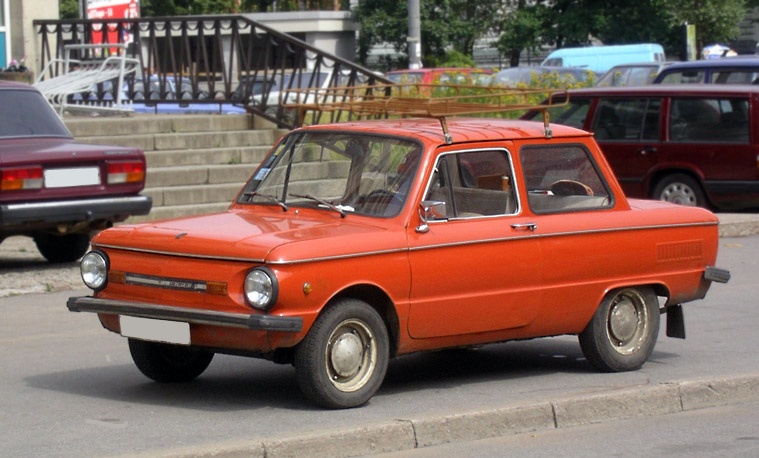
Zaporozhets 968

New Russians (Russian: новые русские, Novye Russkie, the nouveau-riche), a rich class of businessmen and gangsters in post-perestroika, were a very common category of characters in Russian jokes of the 1990s. A common theme is the interaction of a New Russian in his archetypal shiny black Mercedes S600, arguing with a regular Russian in his modest Soviet-era Zaporozhets after their vehicles collide. The New Russian is often a violent criminal or at least speaks criminal argot, with a number of neologisms (or common words with skewed meaning) typical among New Russians. In a way, these anecdotes are a continuation of the Soviet-era series about Georgians, who were then depicted as extremely wealthy. The physical stereotype of the New Russians is often that of overweight men with short haircuts, dressed in thick gold chains and crimson jackets, with their fingers in the horns gesture, cruising around in the "600 Merc" and showing off their wealth. Jokes about expensive foreign sports cars can be compared to German Manta jokes.

- A New Russian's son complains to his father: "Daddy, all my schoolmates are riding the bus, and I look like a black sheep in this 600 Merc." / "No worries, son. I'll buy you a bus, and you'll ride like everyone else!"
- A New Russian's son complains to his father: "Daddy, I've met a beautiful girl, but she agrees to walk with me only if I have Mercedes and 3-floor house" – "Okay, son, I'm ready to buy you Mercedes if she doesn't like your Ferrari, but not to demolish two floors of our house for this foolish girl!"
- A New Russian brags to his colleague: "Look at my new tie. I bought it for 500 dollars in the store over there." / "You were conned. You could have paid twice as much for the same one just across the street!"

== Linguistic quirks ==
Like elsewhere in the world, a good many of jokes in Russia are based on puns. Other jokes depend on grammatical and linguistic oddities and irregularities in the Russian language:

- (L) The genitive plural of a noun (used with a numeral to indicate five or more of something, as opposed to the dual, used for two, three, or four, see Russian nouns) is a rather unpredictable form of the Russian noun, and there are a handful of words which even native speakers have trouble producing this form of (either due to rarity or an actual lexical gap). A common example of this is kocherga (fireplace poker). The joke is set in a Soviet factory. Five pokers are to be requisitioned. The correct forms are acquired, but as they are being filled out, a debate arises: what is the genitive plural of kocherga? Is it Kocherg? Kocherieg? Kochergov?... One thing is clear: a form with the wrong genitive plural of kocherga will bring disaster from the typically pedantic bureaucrats. Finally, an old janitor overhears the commotion, and tells them to send in two separate requisitions: one for two kochergi and another for three kochergi. In some versions, they send in a request for 4 kochergi and one extra, to find out the correct word, only to receive back "here are your 4 kochergi and one extra."

(The correct answer is кочерёг (kocheryog), see its Wiktionary entry.)

A basically identical plot by Mikhail Zoshchenko involves yet another answer: after great care and multiple drafts to get the genitive case correct, including the substitution of "five штук (pieces)" for "five pokers", the response comes back: the warehouse has no kocherezhek (fully regular genitive plural of kocherezhka, "little poker").

=== Eggs ===
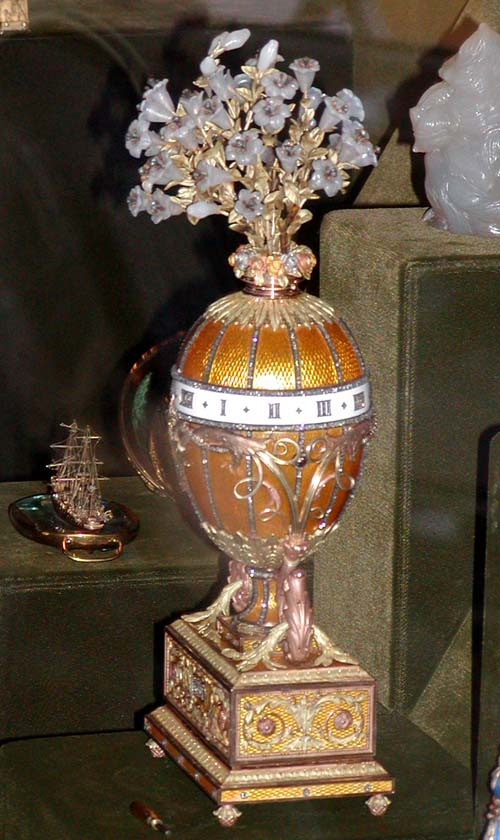

The Russian word for "testicle" is yaichko, a diminutive of yaitso which means "egg", so the slang word is the non-diminutive form (cf. Spanish huevo). A large variety of jokes capitalize on this:

- A man jumps onto a bus and falls over another man, who is holding a large sack and cries out: "Watch the eggs!" / "Are you stupid? Who would carry eggs in a sack?" / "Watch your eggs. This sack is full of nails!"
- There is an exhibit of a precious jeweled Fabergé egg at the Hermitage Museum. The label reads: "Fabergé / Self-portrait (fragment)"
- A train compartment holds a family: a small daughter, her mother, and grandma. A fourth passenger is a Georgian (See jokes about Georgians). The mother starts feeding a soft-boiled egg to the daughter with a silver spoon. / Grandma: "Don't you know that eggs can spoil silver?" / "Who would have known!", thinks the Georgian, and he hastily moves his silver cigarette case from his front pants pocket to the back one.
- Vladimir Putin, in one of his 2002 putinisms noticed by media, exploited this pun; when asked of his opinion about portraits of presidents painted on Easter eggs, he answered: "I don't know what they paint on their eggs; I haven't seen." This is reminiscent of the following joke: A Russian invites his new American friend, a student of Russian culture, to meet his family during the Easter period: "Please meet my mother!" / "Oh, your mother! My respects!" / "That's my sister!" / "Oh, your sister! Charmed!" / "And my brother is in the kitchen, painting the eggs." / "Oh, a hippie! We have them too!"

== Religion ==
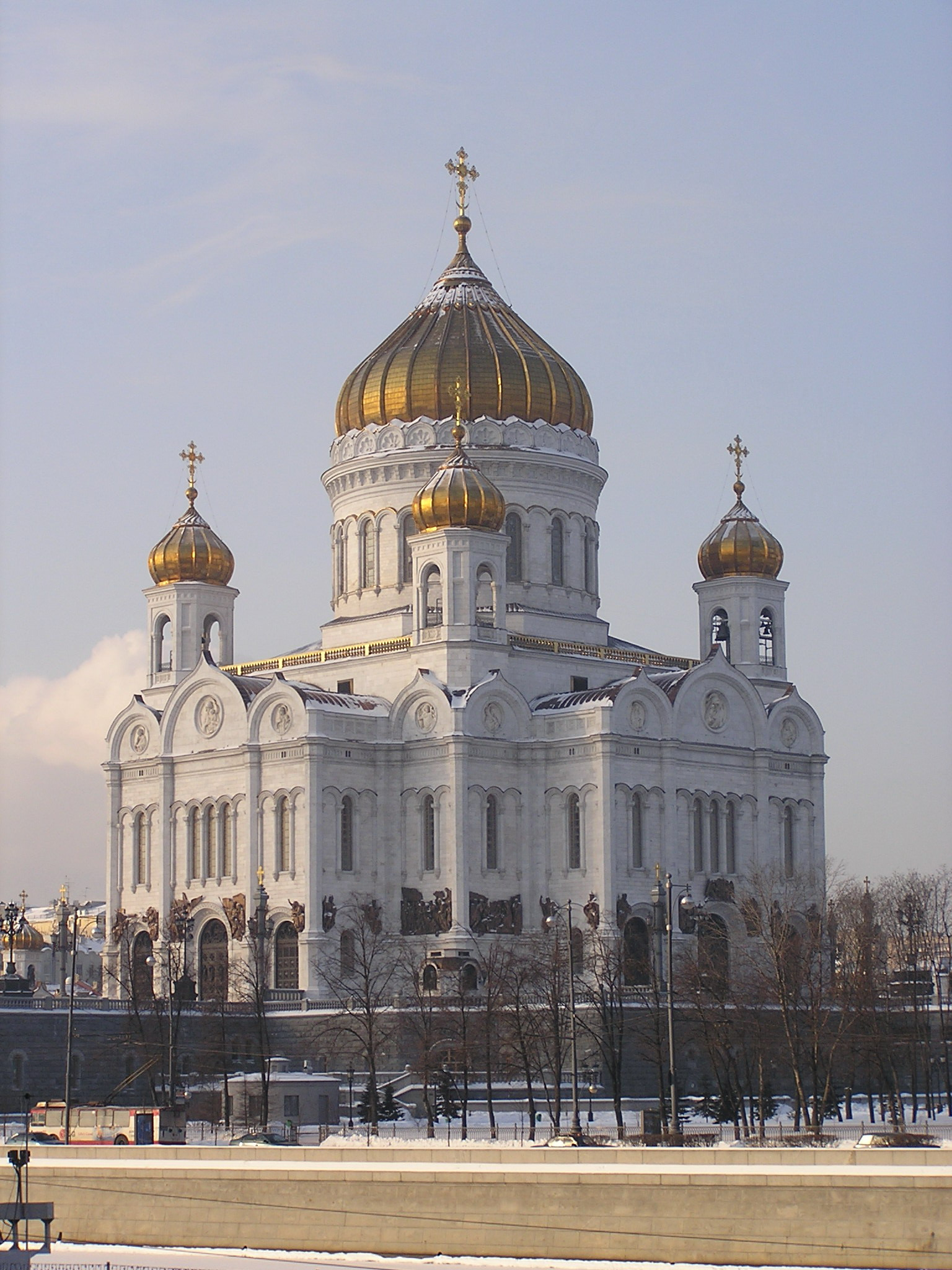

Some religious jokes make fun of the clergy. They tend to be told in quasi-Church Slavonic, with its archaisms and the stereotypical okanye (a clear pronunciation of the unstressed /o/ as [o]; Modern Russian or "Muscovite" speech reduces unstressed /o/ to [ɐ]). Clergymen in these jokes always bear obsolete names of distinctively Greek origin, and speak in a deep voice.

- (L) At the lesson of the Holy Word: "Disciple Dormidontiy, pray tell me, is the soul separable from the body or not." / "Separable, Father." / "Verily speakest thou. Substantiate thy reckoning." / "Yesterday morning, Father, I was passing by your cell and overheard your voice chanting: [imitates basso voicing] '... And now, my soul, arise and get thee dressed.' " / "Substantiatum est... But in vulgar!" (The Russian phrase that translates literally as "my soul" is a term of endearment, often toward romantic partners, comparable to English "my darling")
- A young woman in a miniskirt jumps onto a bus. The bus starts abruptly, and she plops into the lap of a seated elderly priest and jumps up with a surprised "Whoa!" / "It's not a 'whoa!', sweet child", says the priest, "but the key to the doors of Cathedral of Christ the Saviour.".
- "Father Deacon, what would you like – vodka or wine?" – "And beer too", the deacon replies.

=== Afterlife ===
Other jokes touching on religion involve Heaven or Hell. They usually focus on the attempts to settle in Afterlife in a non-trivial way, or how different nationalities/professions/occupations are treated. Jokes about specific people going to Hell and receiving fitting punishment are common as well. Rarer variants include jokes about historic figures coming back from beyond to observe or settle issues of modern Russia.

- A Communist died, and since he was an honest man albeit atheist, he was sentenced to alternate spending one year in Hell and one year in Heaven. One year passed and Satan said to God: "Take this man as fast as possible. Because he turned all my young demons into Young Pioneers, I have to restore some order." Another year passed, Satan meets God again and tells him: "Lord God, it's my turn now." God replied: "First of all, don't call me Lord God, but instead Comrade God; second, there is no God; and one more thing – don't distract me or I'll be late to the Party meeting."
- A Russian and an American are sentenced to Hell. The Devil summons them and says: "Guys, you have 2 options: an American or Russian Hell. In the American one you can do what you want, but you'll have to eat a bucket of shit every morning. The Russian one is the same, but it's 2 buckets." The Yankee quickly makes up his mind and goes to American Hell, while the Russian eventually chooses the Russian one. In a week or so they meet. The Russian asks: "So, what's it like out there?"/ "Exactly what the devil said, the Hell itself is OK, but eating a bucket of shit is killing me. And you?" / "Ah, it feels just like home – either the shit doesn't get delivered or there aren't enough buckets for everyone!"

== Russian military ==
In Russian military jokes, a praporschik (warrant officer) is an archetypal bully, possessed of limited wit.

A. Dmitriev illustrates his sociological essay "Army Humor" with a large number of military jokes, mostly of Russian origin.

There is an enormous number of one-liners, supposedly quoting a praporschik:

- "Private Ivanov, dig a trench from me to the next scarecrow!"
- "Private Ivanov, dig a trench from the fence to lunchtime!"
- "Don't make clever faces at me — you're future officers, now act accordingly!"

The punchline "from the fence to lunchtime" has become a well-known Russian cliché for an assignment with no defined ending (or for doing something forever).

Some of them are philosophical and apply not just to warrant officers:

- Scene One: A tree. An apple. An ape comes and starts to shake the tree. A voice from above: "Think, think!" The ape thinks, grabs a stick, and knocks the apple off.
- Scene Two: A tree. An apple. A praporschik comes and starts to shake the tree. A voice from above: "Think, think!" / "There is nothing to think about, gotta shake!"

A persistent theme in Russian military, police and law-enforcement-related jokes is the ongoing conflict between the representatives of the armed forces/law enforcement, and the "intelligentsia", i.e. well-educated members of society. Therefore, this theme is a satire of the image of military/law-enforcement officers and superiors as dumb and distrustful of "those educated smart-alecks":

- A commander announces: – "The platoon has been assigned to unload 'luminum, the lightest iron in the world". A trooper responds, "Permission to speak... It's 'aluminium', not 'luminum', and it's one of the lightest metals in the world, not the lightest 'iron' in the world." The commander retorts: "The platoon is going to unload 'luminum... and the intelligentsia are going to unload 'castum ironum'!" (The Russian words are lyuminiy and chuguniy).

Many male students of higher education had obligatory military ROTC courses from which they graduated as junior officers in the military reserve. A good many of military jokes originated there:

- "Soviet nuclear bombs are 25% more efficient than the Atomic Bombs of the probable adversary. American bombs have 4 zones of effect: A, B, C, D, while ours have five: А, Б, В, Г, Д!" (the first five letters of the Russian alphabet, they are transliterated into Latin as A, B, V, G, D).
- "A nuclear bomb always hits ground zero."
- "Suppose we have a unit of M tanks... no, M is not enough. Suppose we have a unit of N tanks!"
- Angry threat to an idle student: "I ought to drag you out into the open field, shove you face-first against a wall, and shoot you between the eyes with a shotgun, so that you'd remember it for the rest of your life!"
- Cadets, write down: "the temperature of boiling water is 90°." / One of the privates replies, "Comrade praporshchik, you're mistaken – it's 100°!" / The officer consults his handbook, and then announces, "Right, 100°. It is the right angle that boils at 90°."
- Cadets, now write down: "This device works at a temperature between −400 and 400 degrees Celsius." / "Comrade praporshchik, there is no such temperature as −400 degrees!" / "What would you know, it's a brand new, secret device!" (Note that Russia uses the Celsius scale.)

Sometimes, these silly statements can cross over, intentionally or unintentionally, into the realm of actual wit:

- "Cadet, explain why you have come to class wearing the uniform of our probable military adversary!" (most probably, the instructor means jeans made in the United States) The reply is: "Because they are a probable war trophy!"

There are jokes about Russian nuclear missile forces and worldwide disasters because of lack of basic army discipline:

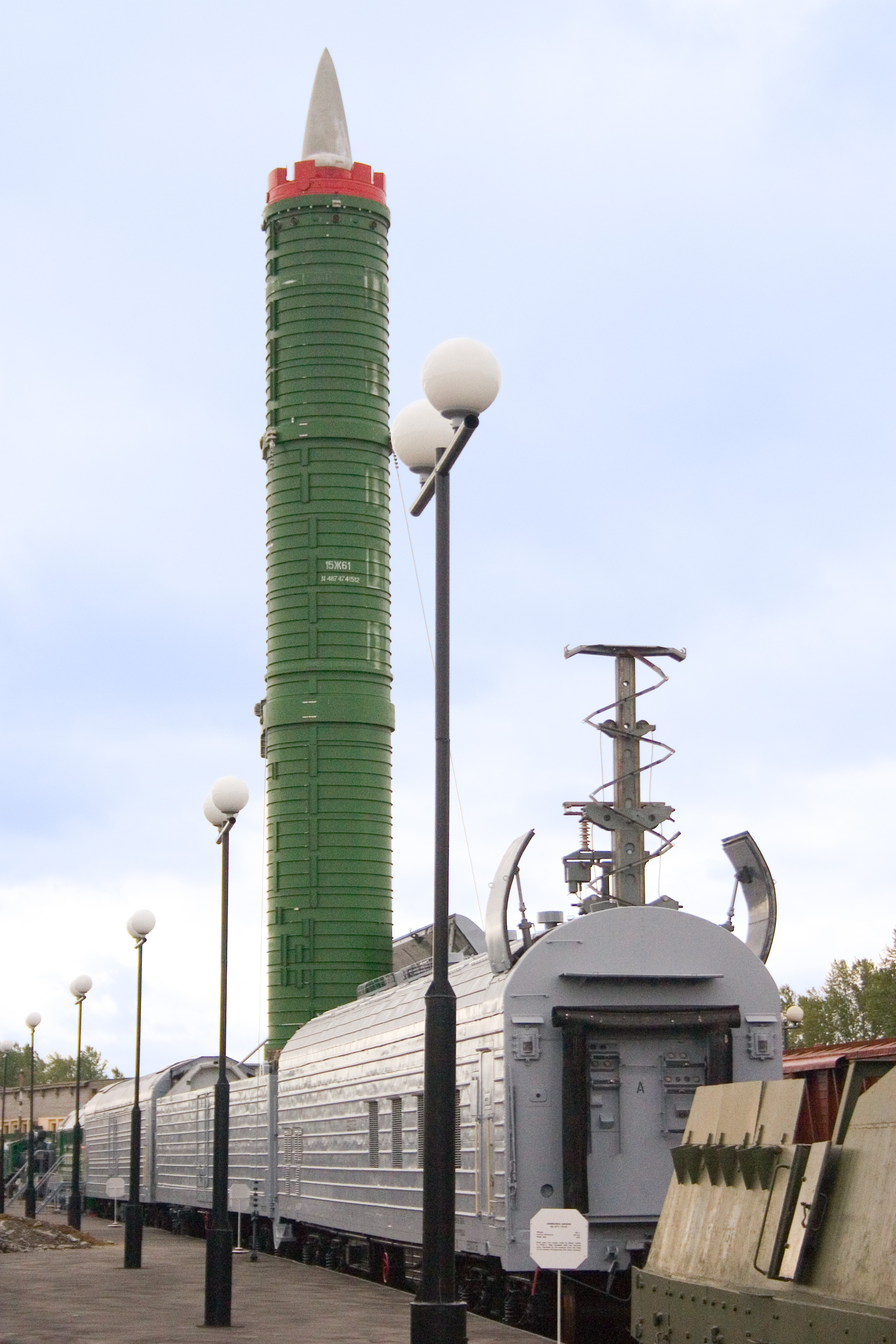

- A missile silo officer falls asleep during his watch, with his face on the control board, and accidentally hits the "big red button". / An angry colonel bursts in, the junior officer snaps awake and proudly announces: "Nothing to report during my watch, Comrade Colonel" / "Nothing to report, you say?! Nothing to report?!! So where the hell is Belgium?!!!"
- Somewhere in the Atlantic Ocean, two submarines, Soviet and American, come to the surface. The Soviet one is old and rusty; the American one is new and sleek matte black. On the Soviet one, the crew lounges about lazily, and a drunken captain yells at them: "Who threw a valenok (traditional Russian winter footwear made of felt) on the control board? I'm asking you, who threw a valenok on the control board?!" / From the American submarine, a clean-shaven, sober, and smartly-dressed captain yells scornfully: "You know, folks, in America..." / The Russian captain dismissively interrupts him: "America??! Ain't no fucking America no more!!" [He turns back to his crew] "Who threw a valenok on the control board?!"

There is also eternal mutual disdain between servicemen and civilians:

- Civilian: "You servicemen are dumb. We civilians are smart!" / Serviceman: "If you are so smart, then why don't you march in single file?"

== Black humor ==
=== Chernobyl ===
- An old woman stands in the market with a "Chernobyl mushrooms for sale" sign. A man goes up to her and asks: "Hey, what are you doing? Who's going to buy Chernobyl mushrooms?" / "Well, lots of people. Some for their boss, others for their mother-in-law..."
- A grandson asks his grandfather: "Grandpa, is it true that in 1986 there was an accident at Chernobyl Nuclear Power Plant?" / "Yes, there was", answers the Grandpa and patted the grandson's head. / "Grandpa, is it true that it had absolutely no consequences?" / "Yes, absolutely", answered the Grandpa, and patted the grandson's other head.
- A Soviet newspaper reports: "Last night the Chernobyl Nuclear Power station fulfilled the Five Year Plan of heat energy generation... in 4 microseconds." (A poke on common Soviet reports about speedy execution of five-year plans.)
- "Is it true, that you may eat meat from Chernobyl?" / "Yes, you may. But your feces will need to be buried in concrete 30 feet deep underground."
- "Mushroom hunting in Chernobyl is difficult, yet entertaining: they scramble when they spot your approach."

=== Medical ===
Medical jokes are widespread. Often, they consist of a short dialogue of doctor or nurse with a patient:

- An autopsy of a dead patient revealed that cause of death was... the autopsy.
- "Nurse, where are we going?" / "To the morgue."/ "But I'm not dead yet!"/ "Well, we haven't arrived yet."
- "Nurse, where are we going?" / "To the morgue."/ "But I'm not dead yet!"/ "The doc said 'to the morgue' — to the morgue it is!" / "But what is wrong with me?!" / "The autopsy will show!"

The phrase "The doc said 'to the morgue' — to the morgue it is!" (Доктор сказал «в морг» — значит, в морг!) became a well-known Russian cliché, meaning that something must be done whether it makes sense or not.

== University students ==
=== Nutrition ===
- A sign in a student dining hall: "Students, do not drop your food on the floor, two cats have already been poisoned!"
- A crocodile's stomach can digest concrete. A student's stomach can digest that of a crocodile.
- A student in the canteen: "Can I have 2 wieners... [he hears whispers all around: "Look at the rich guy!"] ...and 17 forks, please?"

=== Drinking ===
- A very rumpled student peers into an exam room and slurs at the examiner: "Pp-proffessosssor, wou'd you al-low a drunk student tt-o tt-ake the exam?..." / The professor sighs and says, "Sure, why not?" / The rumpled student turns around and slurs into the hallway: "G-guys, c-carry 'im in."

== Cowboys ==
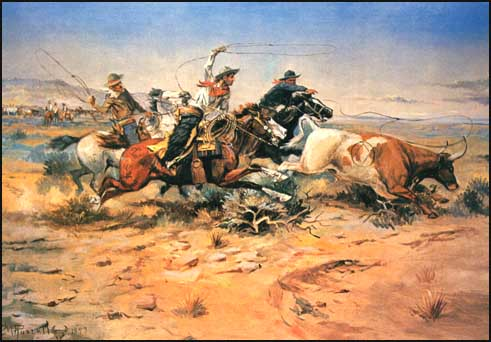

Cowboy jokes are a series about a Wild West full of trigger-happy simple-minded cowboys, and the perception that everything is big in Texas. It is often difficult to guess whether these are imported or genuinely Russian inventions:

- Two cowboys, a newcomer and an old-timer, are drinking beer in front of a saloon. Suddenly, there is a clatter of hooves, a great cloud of dust, and something moving extremely fast from one end of town to the other. The newcomer looks at the old-timer, but seeing no reaction, decides to let the matter drop. However, several minutes later, the same cloud of dust, accompanied by the clatter of hooves, rapidly proceeds in the other direction. Not being able to see what's behind the dust, and unable to contain his curiosity any longer, the newcomer asks: "OK, what the hell was that, Bill?" / "Oh, that's Uncatchable Joe. Nobody has ever managed to catch him, Harry." / "Why? Is he so fast, Bill?" / "Nope, it's just because nobody needs him, Harry." ('Variant: "Nobody cares about him")

The "Uncatchable Joe" (Russian: Неуловимый Джо) has become an ironic nickname in Russia for various difficult-to-find persons (not necessarily unimportant ones). It is suggested that the nickname and the joke originated from a 1923 satirical novel An Uncatchable Enemy: American Novel by Mikhail Kozyrev (ru:Козырев, Михаил Яковлевич) which contained a funny song about a Joe who was uncatchable because no one needed him.

A joke making fun of American films and their pirated English-to-Russian dubbing:

- Two cowboys are standing at crossroads in a prairie. / "Fuck, Bob!" (Voice-over: Where does this road lead to, Bob?) / "Shit, John!" (Voice-over: It leads to Texas, John) / "Fuck, Bob!" (Voice-over: Hell, we don't need to go to Texas, Bob!) / "Shit, John!" (Voice-over: Don't swear, John)

== Disabilities ==
There is a series of jokes set in mental hospitals, some of which have a political subtext:

- A lecturer visits the mental hospital and gives a lecture about how great communism is. Everybody claps loudly except for one person who keeps quiet. The lecturer asks: "Why aren't you clapping?" and the person replies "I'm not a psycho, I am an orderly."
- A reporter interviews a lead doctor in the asylum: "How do you understand that a patient is sane enough to be released? / Well, we have a simple test: we give the patient a spoon and a tea cup and tell him to empty a full bathtub of water! / (laughing) Well, doctor, I assume a sane person will use the cup, not a spoon? / No, a sane person will pull the plug."

A large number of jokes are about distrofiks, people with severe marasmus (termed "alimentary dystrophy" in Russian). The main themes are the extreme weakness, slowness, gauntness, and emaciation of a dystrophic patient. Some of the jibes originated in jokes about Gulag camps. Alexander Solzhenitsyn, in his Gulag Archipelago, wrote that dystrophy was a typical phase in the life of a Gulag inmate, and quotes the following joke:

- In order to refute international rumors, Stalin allowed a foreign delegation to inspect some Gulag camps. As a result, a foreign reporter wrote "a zek is lazy, gluttonous, and deceiving". Unfortunately, the same reporter soon landed in a Gulag as an inmate himself. When later released, he instead wrote "a zek is lean, ringing, and transparent" (Russian: tonkiy, zvonkiy, and prozrachny).
- Muscular dystrophy patients are playing hide and seek in the hospital: "Vovka, where are you?" / "I'm here, behind this broomstick!" / "Hey, didn't we have an agreement not to hide behind thick objects?"
- A jovial doctor comes into a dystrophy ward: "Greetings, eagles!" (a Russian cliché in addressing brave soldiers) / "We're not eagles. We're only flying because the nurse turned the fan on!"

== Taboo vocabulary ==
The very use of obscene Russian vocabulary, called mat, can enhance the humorous effect of a joke by its emotional impact. Due to the somewhat different cultural attitude to obscene slang, such an effect is difficult to render in English. The taboo status often makes mat itself the subject of a joke. One typical plot goes as follows.

A construction site expects an inspection from the higher-ups, so a foreman warns the boys to watch their tongues. During the inspection, a hammer is accidentally dropped from the fourth floor right on a worker's head... The punch line is an exceedingly polite, classy rebuke from the mouth of the injured, rather than a typically expected "#@&%$!". For example the injured worker might say: "Dear co-workers, could you please watch your tools a little more carefully, so as to prevent such cases and avoid work-place injuries?"

Another series of jokes exploits the richness of the mat vocabulary, which can give a substitute to a great many words of everyday conversation. Other languages often use profanity in a similar way (like the English fuck, for example), but the highly synthetic grammar of Russian provides for the unambiguity and the outstandingly great number of various derivations from a single mat root. Emil Draitser points out that linguists explain that the linguistic properties of the Russian language rich in affixes allows for expression of a wide variety of feelings and notions using only a few core mat words.

== See also ==
- Anecdote
