= Pledge Across America =

Pledge Across America, also known as the National School Celebration, was an annual event in the United States, during which students at schools across the country would all recite the Pledge of Allegiance at the same time. The 2001 edition of the event, for example, took place at 2:00 p.m. in the Eastern Time Zone, 1:00 p.m. CDT, noon MDT, 11:00 a.m. PDT, 10:00 a.m. in Alaska, and 8:00 a.m. in Hawaii, so that the recitation would be simultaneous nationwide.

The event was originated by Celebration USA, a nonprofit organization founded by Paula Burton of Villa Park, California. It was initially planned for October 9, 1992, to mark the 100th anniversary of the Pledge's introduction in 1892 and the 500th anniversary of Christopher Columbus' landing in the Americas. Burton tried to contact Secretary of Education Lamar Alexander with the proposal, but Alexander never responded. A Congressional joint resolution recognizing the event never left committee. Lacking the support of the federal government, Burton approached state governors, local school districts, and corporate sponsors to popularize the event. Sponsors included Honda of America and The Walt Disney Company, which invited over 1,000 schoolchildren inside the Disneyland gates to recite the Pledge.

After the initial 1992 event, Celebration USA continued to promote similar events each year on the Friday before Columbus Day weekend. In the wake of the September 11 attacks, a Department of Education employee came across Celebration USA's website and suggested that the federal government promote the upcoming event on October 12, 2001. Secretary of Education Rod Paige sent information about the event to over 100,000 schools across the country, and President George W. Bush participated in the recitation at the White House. Rep. Christopher Cox led the House of Representatives in the Pledge at the designated time.

In 2002, the Department of Education asked Celebration USA to move the event to September 17 to celebrate Constitution Day. President Bush and Secretary Paige participated that day while visiting East Literature Magnet School in Nashville, Tennessee. After 2002, the federal government did not continue its support of the event, which continued to be promoted by Celebration USA each September 17 as recently as 2012.
