= Lukashisms =

Utterances of Alexander Lukashenko

Lukashisms (Russian: лукашизмы, лукашенкизмы) are peculiar utterances of President of Belarus Alexander Lukashenko, a frequent target of Belarusian and Russian humor. Apart from being gaffes, the humor of Lukashisms relies on the peculiarity of Lukashenko's speech: to a significant degree it contains elements of trasianka, a mixture of Belarusian and Russian languages and accents, seen as a sign of a poorly educated rural dweller, "kolkhoznik".

== Notable examples ==
- "Не успел я узяцца за яйца как масла ишчэзла" ("I had hardly seized the eggs when the butter disappeared.") Lukashenko was talking about his struggle with food supply shortages in Belarus. The humorous effect comes from heavy trasianka and the fact that "eggs" (яйца) is a Russian slang term for "balls" (testicles), a popular theme of many Russian jokes. So this may read as, "I had hardly grabbed the balls when the butter disappeared."
- "Наш народ будет жыць плоха, но не долга" ("Our people will live poorly, but not for a long time.")
- "Я регулярно ператрахиваю все кадры и точно знаю, кто врот, а кто не врот!" In correct Russian it should be "Я регулярно ператрЯхиваю все кадры и точно знаю, кто врЁт, а кто не врЁт!" meaning "I regularly shuffle all the cadre and know for sure who lies and who doesn't". As a result of trasianka the sentence sounds like, "I regularly fuck all the cadre and know for sure who (takes it) in the mouth and who doesn't."
- "Я свое государство за цивилизованным миром не поведу." ("I will not lead my state after the civilized world.") The humor comes from the fact that among Russian conservative-leaning populace the term "the so-called civilized world" (essentially meaning Western world) has become an insult aimed at their opponents when, after a brief period of post-Soviet de-escalation, Russia pitched itself against the West again.
- "Я атеист, но я православный атеист." ("I am an atheist, but I am a pravoslavny atheist.") A "pravoslavny (Orthodox Christian)" atheist is an oxymoron; Lukashenko meant that he associated himself with the secular Orthodox Christian culture.
- "В свое время Германия была поднята из руин благодаря очень жесткой власти. Не все только плохое было связано в Германии с известным Адольфом Гитлером." ("Germany rose from the ruins thanks to very severe rule, and not everything connected with Adolf Hitler in Germany was bad. [...]") This praise of Adolf Hitler spoken by Lukashenko a 1995 interview to Handelsblatt resulted in minor political scandal. It was one of his controversial statements made in public.
- "Я прощаю женщинам их лесбиянство, но никогда в жизни не прощу мужчинам того, что они геи." ("I forgive women for their lesbianism, but I'll never in my lifetime forgive men for being gay.")
- "А я сейчас вам покажу, откуда на Беларусь готовилось нападение" ("And now I will show you, where the attack on Belarus was being prepared from.") This phrase started Lukashenko's attempt to justify Russia's invasion of Ukraine. Clips with this phrase inserted into various situations have become an internet meme in 2022, second in popularity to his phrase "Our people will live poorly, but not for a long time".

== See also ==
- Putinisms
