= Wałęsism =

Utterances of Lech Wałęsa

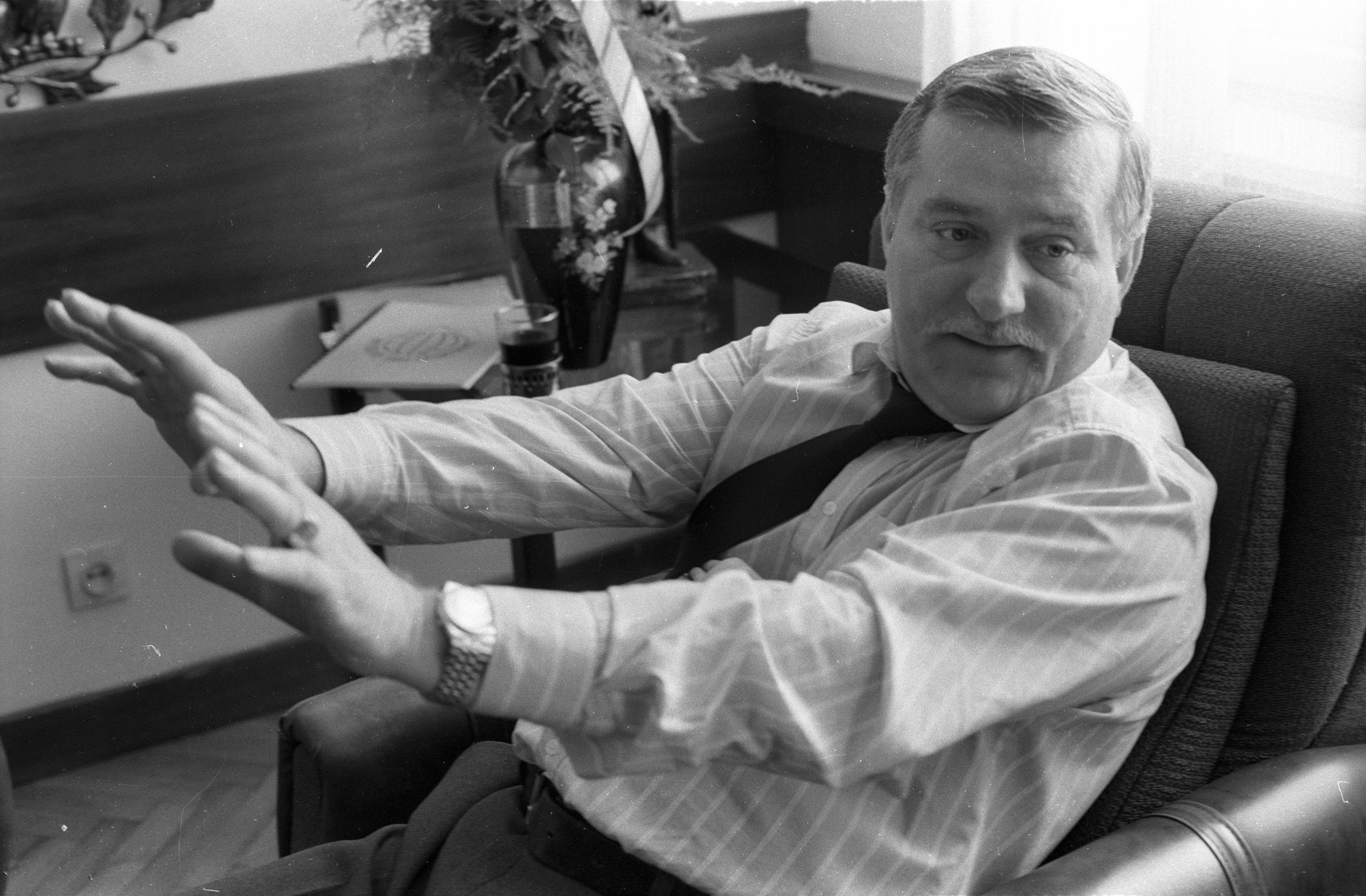
Lech Wałęsa, 1990

Wałęsisms, also known in Poland as wałęsaliki, wałęsalia, are expressions uttered by or ascribed to Lech Wałęsa, the first President of post-Communist Poland. Before that he was an ordinary electrician, who became the leader of the Solidarity movement, which destroyed the Communist rule in Poland. Many of wałęsisms had become a well-established part of Polish culture.

== Notable utterances ==
- "są plusy dodatnie i plusy ujemne" - "There are positive pluses and negative pluses" In fact, he said "Plusy Unii Europejskiej mają plusy i minusy" ("Pluses of the European Union have both pluses and minuses").
- "jestem za, a nawet przeciw" - "I am for, and even against"
- "Nie chcem, ale muszem!" - the humor lies in the ambivalence of the phrase: it can be understood as "I do not simply want to, but I have to!", but also "I don't want to, but I have to!"
- "Dobrze się stało, że źle się stało" - "It was good that it was bad".

Several of his expressions topped the popular poll "Silver Lips: 1992, 1st place: "Nie chcem być prezydentem, ale muszem", "Zdrowie wasze w gardła nasze"; 1993: 3rd place: "Nie można mieć pretensji do Słońca, że się kręci wokół Ziemi"; 1996, 2nd place: "Ja już nie szukam pieniędzy za książki, bo te całkowicie udupiłem w sprawach społecznych..."
