= Semantic change =

Evolution of a word's meaning

Semantic change (also semantic shift, semantic progression, semantic development, or semantic drift) is a form of language change regarding the evolution of word usage—usually to the point that the modern meaning is radically different from the original usage. In diachronic (or historical) linguistics, semantic change is a change in one of the meanings of a word. Every word has a variety of senses and connotations, which can be added, removed, or altered over time, often to the extent that cognates across space and time have very different meanings. The study of semantic change can be seen as part of etymology, onomasiology, semasiology, and semantics.

== Examples in English ==
- Awful – Literally "full of awe", originally meant "inspiring wonder (or fear)", hence "impressive". In contemporary usage, the word means "extremely bad".
- Awesome – Literally "awe-inducing", originally meant "inspiring wonder (or fear)", hence "impressive". In contemporary usage, the word means "extremely good".
- Terrible – Originally meant "inspiring terror", shifted to indicate anything spectacular, then to something spectacularly bad.
- Terrific – Originally meant "inspiring terror", shifted to indicate anything spectacular, then to something spectacularly good.
- Nice – Originally meant "foolish, ignorant, frivolous, senseless". from Old French nice (12c.) meaning "careless, clumsy; weak; poor, needy; simple, stupid, silly, foolish", from Latin nescius ("ignorant or unaware"). Literally "not-knowing", from ne- "not" (from PIE root *ne- "not") + stem of scire "to know" (compare with science). "The sense development has been extraordinary, even for an adj". [Weekley] -- from "timid, faint-hearted" (pre-1300); to "fussy, fastidious" (late 14c.); to "dainty, delicate" (c. 1400); to "precise, careful" (1500s, preserved in such terms as a nice distinction and nice and early); to "agreeable, delightful" (1769); to "kind, thoughtful" (1830).
- Naïf or Naïve – Initially meant "natural, primitive, or native" . From French naïf, literally "native", the masculine form of the French word, but used in English without reference to gender. As a noun, "natural, artless, naive person", first attested 1893, from French, where Old French naif also meant "native inhabitant; simpleton, natural fool".
- Demagogue – Originally meant "a popular leader". It is from the Greek dēmagōgós "leader of the people", from dēmos "people" + agōgós "leading, guiding". Now the word has strong connotations of a politician who panders to emotions and prejudice.
- Egregious – Originally described something that was remarkably good (as in Theorema Egregium). The word is from the Latin egregius "illustrious, select", literally, "standing out from the flock", which is from ex—"out of" + greg—(grex) "flock". Now it means something that is remarkably bad or flagrant.
- Gay – Originally meant (13th century) "lighthearted", "joyous" or (14th century) "bright and showy", it also came to mean "happy"; it acquired connotations of immorality as early as 1637, either sexual e.g., gay woman "prostitute", gay man "womaniser", gay house "brothel", or otherwise, e.g., gay dog "over-indulgent man" and gay deceiver "deceitful and lecherous". In the United States by 1897 the expression gay cat referred to a hobo, especially a younger hobo in the company of an older one; by 1935, it was used in prison slang for a homosexual boy; and by 1951, and clipped to gay, referred to homosexuals. George Chauncey, in his book Gay New York, would put this shift as early as the late 19th century among a certain "in crowd", knowledgeable of gay night-life. In the modern day, it is most often used to refer to homosexuals, at first among themselves and then in society at large, with a neutral connotation; or as a derogatory synonym for "silly", "dumb", or "boring".
- Guy – Guy Fawkes was the alleged leader of a plot to blow up the English Houses of Parliament on November 5, 1605. The day was made a holiday, Guy Fawkes Day, commemorated by parading and burning a ragged manikin of Fawkes, known as a Guy. This led to the use of the word guy as a term for any "person of grotesque appearance" and then by the late 1800s—especially in the United States—for "any man", as in, e.g., "Some guy called for you". Over the 20th century, guy has replaced fellow in the U.S., and, under the influence of American popular culture, has been gradually replacing fellow, bloke, chap and other such words throughout the rest of the English-speaking world. In the plural, it can refer to a mixture of genders (e.g., "Come on, you guys!" could be directed to a group of mixed gender instead of only men).

== Evolution of typologies ==
A number of classification schemes have been suggested for semantic change.

Recent overviews have been presented by Blank and Blank & Koch (1999). Semantic change has attracted academic discussions since ancient times, although the first major works emerged in the 19th century with Reisig (1839), Paul (1880), and Darmesteter (1887). Studies beyond the analysis of single words have been started with the word-field analyses of Trier (1931), who claimed that every semantic change of a word would also affect all other words in a lexical field. His approach was later refined by Coseriu (1964). Fritz (1974) introduced Generative semantics. More recent works including pragmatic and cognitive theories are those in Warren (1992), Dirk Geeraerts, Traugott (1990) and Blank (1997).

A chronological list of typologies is presented below. Today, the most currently used typologies are those by Bloomfield (1933) and Blank (1999).

=== Typology by Reisig (1839) ===
Reisig's ideas for a classification were published posthumously. He resorts to classical rhetorics and distinguishes between

- Synecdoche: shifts between part and whole
- Metonymy: shifts between cause and effect
- Metaphor

=== Typology by Paul (1880) ===
- Generalization: enlargement of single senses of a word's meaning
- Specialization on a specific part of the contents: reduction of single senses of a word's meaning
- Transfer on a notion linked to the based notion in a spatial, temporal, or causal way

=== Typology by Darmesteter (1887) ===
- Metaphor
- Metonymy
- Narrowing of meaning
- Widening of meaning

The last two are defined as change between whole and part, which would today be rendered as synecdoche.

=== Typology by Bréal (1899) ===
- Restriction of sense: change from a general to a special meaning
- Enlargement of sense: change from a special to a general meaning
- Metaphor
- "Thickening" of sense: change from an abstract to a concrete meaning

=== Typology by Stern (1931) ===
- Substitution: Change related to the change of an object, of the knowledge referring to the object, of the attitude toward the object, e.g., artillery "engines of war used to throw missiles" → "mounted guns", atom "inseparable smallest physical-chemical element" → "physical-chemical element consisting of electrons, protons, and neutrons", scholasticism "philosophical system of the Middle Ages" → "servile adherence to the methods and teaching of schools"
- Analogy: Change triggered by the change of an associated word, e.g., fast adj. "fixed and rapid" ← fast adv. "fixedly, rapidly"
- Shortening: e.g., periodical ← periodical paper
- Nomination: "the intentional naming of a referent, new or old, with a name that has not previously been used for it" (Stern 1931: 282), e.g., lion "brave man" ← "lion"
- Regular transfer: a subconscious Nomination
- Permutation: non-intentional shift of one referent to another due to a reinterpretation of a situation, e.g., bead "prayer" → "pearl in a rosary")
- Adequation: Change in the attitude of a concept; distinction from substitution is unclear.

This classification does not neatly distinguish between processes and forces/causes of semantic change.

=== Typology by Bloomfield (1933) ===
The most widely accepted scheme in the English-speaking academic world is from Bloomfield (1933):

- Narrowing: Change from superordinate level to subordinate level. For example, skyline formerly referred to any horizon, but now in the US it has narrowed to a horizon decorated by skyscrapers.
- Widening: There are many examples of specific brand names being used for the general product, such as with Kleenex. Such uses are known as generonyms: see genericization.
- Metaphor: Change based on similarity of thing. For example, broadcast originally meant "to cast seeds out"; with the advent of radio and television, the word was extended to indicate the transmission of audio and video signals. Outside of agricultural circles, very few use broadcast in the earlier sense.
- Metonymy: Change based on nearness in space or time, e.g., jaw "cheek" → "mandible".
- Synecdoche: Change based on whole-part relation. The convention of using capital cities to represent countries or their governments is an example of this.
- Hyperbole: Change from weaker to stronger meaning, e.g., kill "torment" → "slaughter"
- Meiosis: Change from stronger to weaker meaning, e.g., astound "strike with thunder" → "surprise strongly".
- Degeneration: e.g., knave "boy" → "servant" → "deceitful or despicable man"; awful "awe-inspiring" → "very bad".
- Elevation: e.g., knight "boy" → "nobleman"; terrific "terrifying" → "astonishing" → "very good".

=== Typology by Ullmann (1957, 1962) ===
Ullmann distinguishes between nature and consequences of semantic change:

- Nature of semantic change
  - Metaphor: change based on a similarity of senses
  - Metonymy: change based on a contiguity of senses
  - Folk-etymology: change based on a similarity of names
  - Ellipsis: change based on a contiguity of names
- Consequences of semantic change
  - Widening of meaning: rise of quantity
  - Narrowing of meaning: loss of quantity
  - Amelioration of meaning: rise of quality
  - Pejoration of meaning: loss of quality

=== Typology by Blank (1999) ===
However, the categorization of Blank (1999) has gained increasing acceptance:

- Metaphor: Change based on similarity between concepts, e.g., mouse "rodent" → "computer device".
- Metonymy: Change based on contiguity between concepts, e.g., horn "animal horn" → "musical instrument".
- Synecdoche: A type of metonymy involving a part to whole relationship, e.g. "hands" from "all hands on deck" → "bodies"
- Specialization of meaning: Downward shift in a taxonomy, e.g., corn "grain" → "wheat" (UK), → "maize" (US).
- Generalization of meaning: Upward shift in a taxonomy, e.g., hoover "Hoover vacuum cleaner" → "any type of vacuum cleaner".
- Cohyponymic transfer: Horizontal shift in a taxonomy, e.g., the confusion of mouse and rat in some dialects.
- Antiphrasis: Change based on a contrastive aspect of the concepts, e.g., perfect lady in the sense of "prostitute".
- Auto-antonymy: Change of a word's sense and concept to the complementary opposite, e.g., bad in the slang sense of "good".
- Auto-converse: Lexical expression of a relationship by the two extremes of the respective relationship, e.g., take in the dialectal use as "give".
- Ellipsis: Semantic change based on the contiguity of names, e.g., car "cart" → "automobile", due to the invention of the (motor) car.
- Folk-etymology: Semantic change based on the similarity of names, e.g., French contredanse, orig. English country dance.

Blank considered it problematic to include amelioration and pejoration of meaning (as in Ullman) as well as strengthening and weakening of meaning (as in Bloomfield). According to Blank, these are not objectively classifiable phenomena; moreover, Blank has argued that all of the examples listed under these headings can be grouped under other phenomena, rendering the categories redundant.

== Forces triggering change ==
Blank has tried to create a complete list of motivations for semantic change. They can be summarized as:

- Linguistic forces
- Psychological forces
- Sociocultural forces
- Cultural/encyclopedic forces

This list has been revised and slightly enlarged by Grzega (2004):

- Fuzziness (i.e., difficulties in classifying the referent or attributing the right word to the referent, thus mixing up designations)
- Dominance of the prototype (i.e., fuzzy difference between superordinate and subordinate term due to the monopoly of the prototypical member of a category in the real world)
- Social reasons (i.e., contact situation with "undemarcation" effects)
- Institutional and non-institutional linguistic pre- and proscriptivism (i.e., legal and peer-group linguistic pre- and proscriptivism, aiming at "demarcation")
- Flattery
- Insult
- Disguising language (i.e., "misnomers")
- Taboo (i.e., taboo concepts)
- Aesthetic-formal reasons (i.e., avoidance of words that are phonetically similar or identical to negatively associated words)
- Communicative-formal reasons (i.e., abolition of the ambiguity of forms in context, keyword: "homonymic conflict and polysemic conflict")
- Wordplay/punning
- Excessive length of words
- Morphological misinterpretation (keyword: "folk-etymology", creation of transparency by changes within a word)
- Logical-formal reasons (keyword: "lexical regularization", creation of consociation)
- Desire for plasticity (creation of a salient motivation of a name)
- Anthropological salience of a concept (i.e., anthropologically given emotionality of a concept, "natural salience")
- Culture-induced salience of a concept ("cultural importance")
- Changes in the referents (i.e., changes in the world)
- Worldview change (i.e., changes in the categorization of the world)
- Prestige/fashion (based on the prestige of another language or variety, of certain word-formation patterns, or of certain semasiological centers of expansion)

== Reappropriation ==
A specific case of semantic change is reappropriation, a cultural process by which a group reclaims words or artifacts that were previously used in a way disparaging of that group, for example like with the word queer. Other related processes include pejoration and amelioration.

== Practical studies ==
Apart from many individual studies, etymological dictionaries are prominent reference books for finding out about semantic changes. A recent survey lists practical tools and online systems for investigating semantic change of words over time. WordEvolutionStudy is an academic platform that takes arbitrary words as input to generate summary views of their evolution based on Google Books ngram dataset and the Corpus of Historical American English.

== See also ==
- Calque
- Dead metaphor
- Euphemism treadmill
- False friend
- Formal thought disorder
- Genericized trademark
- Language change
- Lexicology and lexical semantics
- List of calques
- Newspeak
- Phono-semantic matching
- Q-based narrowing
- Retronym
- Semantic field
- Skunked term
