= Semantic loan =

Linguistic process

In linguistics, semantic loan is a process (or an instance or result) of borrowing semantic meaning (rather than lexical items) from another language. It is very similar to the formation of calques, excepting that in this case the complete word in the borrowing language already exists; the change is that its meaning is extended to include another meaning that is already possessed by its counterpart in the lending language. Semantic loans are often grouped roughly together with calques and loanwords under the phrase borrowing.

Semantic loans often occur when two languages are in close contact, and they take various forms. The source and target word may be cognates, which may or may not share any contemporary meaning in common; they may be an existing loan translation or parallel construction (compound of corresponding words); or they may be unrelated words that share an existing meaning.

== Examples ==
A typical example is the French word souris, which means "mouse" (the animal). When the English word mouse acquired the additional sense of "computer mouse", and French speakers began speaking of computer mice, they did so by extending the meaning of their own word souris by analogy with how English speakers had extended the meaning of mouse. (Had French speakers started using the word mouse, that would have been a borrowing; had they created a new lexeme out of multiple French morphemes, as with disque dur for "hard disk", that would have been a calque.)

Another example, in this case propelled by speakers of the source language, is the English word already. The Yiddish word for the literal senses of "already" is שוין shoyn, which is also used as a tag to express impatience. Yiddish speakers who also spoke English began using the English word already to express this additional sense in English, and this usage came to be adopted in the larger English-speaking community (as in Enough already or Would you hurry up already?) This sense of already is therefore a semantic borrowing of that sense of shoyn.

Some examples arise from reborrowing. For example, English pioneer was borrowed from Middle French in the sense of "digger, foot soldier, pedestrian", then acquired the sense of "early colonist, innovator" in English, which was reborrowed into French, adding to the senses of the word pionnier.

Typical semantic loans also include the German realisieren. The English verb "to realise" has more than one meaning: it means both "to make something happen/come true" and "to become aware of something". The German verb realisieren originally only meant the former: to make something real. However, German later borrowed the other meaning of "to realise" from English, and today, according to Duden, realisieren also means "to become aware of something" (this meaning is still considered by many to be an Anglicism). The word realisieren itself already existed before the borrowing took place; the only thing borrowed was this second meaning. (Compare this with a calque, such as antibody, from the German Antikörper, where the word "antibody" did not exist in English before it was borrowed.)

A similar example is the German verb überziehen, which meant only to draw something across, before it took on the additional borrowed meaning of its literal English translation overdraw in the financial sense. Note that the first halves of the terms are cognate (über/over), but the second halves are not (ziehen/draw).

Semantic loans may be adopted by many different languages, as [computer] mouse has been. As another example, each of Hebrew כוכב kokháv, Russian звезда zvezdá, Polish gwiazda, Finnish tähti, Chinese 明星 míngxīng, and Vietnamese sao originally meant "star" in the astronomical sense but have acquired from English the sememe "star", as in a famous entertainer. In this case the words are unrelated (save for the Russian and Polish words), but share a base meaning, here extended metaphorically.

== See also ==
- Calque
- List of calques
- Semantics
- Semantic change
- Phono-semantic matching
- Polysemy
