= English understatement =

Element of English culture

Understatement is an aspect of traditional English culture. It has been exploited to humorous effect, but it is also characterised as part of the English cultural attitude to life.

== In medieval times ==
Old English texts relied extensively upon wordplay such as understatement and double negatives; understatement (litotes) is used at least 94 times in the Anglo-Saxon epic poem Beowulf, a "high frequency". One author has described this "stylistic mannerism" to be inherited from "an earlier, possibly common-Germanic, poetic tradition"; he notes that understatement is also found in mediaeval German poetry and Old Norse poetry. Such understatement may have the effect of mocking irony, humour, emphasis, and the tempering of an (otherwise rather sharp) expression.

== Culture ==
A fictional meeting between Uxbridge and Wellington after the former lost his leg at Waterloo

A prominent example of English understatement occurred during the Battle of Waterloo, where Lord Uxbridge's right leg was struck by a French cannonball. Uxbridge, who was near his superior Lord Wellington, allegedly exclaimed "By God, sir, I've lost my leg!", to which Wellington supposedly replied "By God, sir, so you have!" During the operation to remove his leg, Uxbridge's only comment was "The knives appear somewhat blunt."

This attitude of understatement was exemplified by a comment upon Sarah Bernhardt's violent depiction of Cleopatra in the 1891 play of that title: "How different, how very different, from the home life of our own dear Queen!" The Oxford Dictionary of Quotations judges this critique to be apocryphal. The Pall Mall Gazette of 28 December 1906 attributed the reaction as being to a performance of Shakespeare's Anthony and Cleopatra starring Lillie Langtry, not Bernhardt, "some fifteen years ago," which would have been around 1891.

Understatement may be used to convey calmness and self-control to others in a moment of crisis. In 1916, during the opening stages of the Battle of Jutland, Admiral Beatty, commander of the First Battle Cruiser Squadron, witnessed the explosion of two of his largest battlecruisers (Note: The Indefatigable and the Queen Mary. Beatty made the comment when it appeared a third ship, HMS Princess Royal had also been destroyed.) within half an hour of each other; he is said to have remarked to his subordinate that "there seems to be something wrong with our bloody ships today".

Better documented is the cross-cultural miscommunication between British and American personnel at the Battle of the Imjin River during the Korean War. In April 1951, 650 British troops of the Gloucestershire Regiment were deployed on the most important crossing on the Imjin River to block the traditional invasion route to Seoul. The Chinese People's Volunteer Army had sent an entire division of 10,000 men against the isolated British troops in a major offensive to take the whole Korean peninsula, and the defenders were gradually surrounded and overwhelmed. After two days of fighting, American Major General Robert H. Soule asked British Brigadier Thomas Brodie: "How are the Glosters doing?" Brodie, with English understatement, replied: "A bit sticky, things are pretty sticky down there." To Soule, this did not sound desperate, and so he ordered them to stand fast. The surviving Glosters were rescued by a column of tanks; they escaped under fire, sitting on the decks of the tanks.

In November 1963, as The Beatles were becoming a cultural phenomenon in Britain but were still unknown to the Americans, a photo appeared in the British press showing John Lennon, Paul McCartney, and George Harrison playing Rickenbacker guitars. Rickenbacker's London distributor, his "urgency cloaked in British understatement," wrote to the company's California headquarters, "This shows both the Rickenbacker's (sic) used by the group I mentioned to you. We'll need samples of both these models, please."

During the Kuala Lumpur–Perth leg of British Airways Flight 9 on 24 June 1982, volcanic ash caused all four engines of the Boeing 747 aircraft to fail. Although pressed for time as the aircraft rapidly lost altitude, Captain Eric Moody still managed to make an announcement to the passengers: "Ladies and Gentlemen, this is your Captain speaking. We have a small problem. All four engines have stopped. We are doing our damnedest to get them going again. I trust you are not in too much distress."
