= Meiosis (figure of speech) =

Intentional understatement

In rhetoric, meiosis is a euphemistic figure of speech that intentionally understates something or implies that it is lesser in significance or size than it really is. Meiosis is the opposite of auxesis, and is often compared to litotes. The term is derived from the Greek μειόω ("to make smaller", "to diminish"). The satirical technique diminution often involves meiosis.

== Examples ==
=== Historical ===
- "(Our) peculiar institution", for slavery and its economic ramifications in the American South
- "The Recent Unpleasantness", used in the 19th century, again in the American South, as an idiom to refer to the American Civil War and its aftermath
- "The Emergency", a term used in the Republic of Ireland for the conflict that the rest of the world called the Second World War
- "The Troubles", a name for decades of violence in Northern Ireland

=== Other ===
- "The Pond", for the Atlantic Ocean ("across the pond"). Similarly, "The Ditch" for the Tasman Sea, between Australia and New Zealand.
- "The Outback". Under its original etymology in the late 19th century, this was a meiosis comparison between the vast empty regions of central Australia and the backyard of a house, but its usage today is so common and so far distanced from its etymology that the meiosis effect has been lost.
- "Intolerable meiosis!" comments a character in William Golding's Fire Down Below as their ship encounters an iceberg, responding to another character's comment, "We are privileged. How many people have seen anything like this?"

== See also ==
- English understatement
- Euphemism
- Figure of speech
- Hyperbole
- Paradiastole
