= Double comparative =

English grammatical practice

When an adjective includes two comparative markers, it is referred to as a double comparative. Examples of double comparatives include phrases such as "more louder" and "worser". The use of double comparatives is most commonly linked to specific dialects, particularly Appalachian English and African American Vernacular English. However, this linguistic feature was not uncommon in Early Modern English. In fact, it was frequently utilized by Shakespeare in his works.

"The Duke of Milan / and his more braver daughter could controul thee."—Shakespeare, The Tempest

In recent times, such constructions have been employed not only for their original purpose of adding emphasis but also in a humorous context or to convey a sense of erudition. Additionally, these constructions can be used to mock or mimic the formal speech patterns of past eras, adding a layer of sophistication or irony to the language.

"The female of the species is more deadlier than the male"—Space, "Female of the Species", 1996
"World must prepare for disease more deadlier than Covid, WHO chief warns", The Independent, describing remarks by World Health Organization Director-General Tedros Adhanom Ghebreyesus, 2023

== See also ==
- Double negative
- Double superlative
