= Double superlative =

English grammatical practice

A double superlative is the use of both "most" and the suffix "-est" to form the superlative of an adjective in English grammar. This grammatical practice has been contested throughout the history of the English language. The presence of more than one superlative marker is widespread across varieties of English around the world and is also found in other languages. Historically, this construction dates back to Old English. Shakespeare provides numerous examples of double superlatives in his works.

"Canst thou, O partial sleep, give thy repose / To the wet sea-boy in an hour so rude, / And in the calmest and most stillest night, / With all appliances and means to boot, / Deny it to a king?"—Shakespeare, Henry IV, Part Two

Another famous example of a double superlative used in the works of Shakespeare is in the play, Julius Caesar. Anthony, in his memorialization of Caesar, describing Brutus' stabbing as "the most unkindest cut of all".

== See also ==
- Double comparative
- Double negative
