= Diminution (disambiguation) =

Diminution may refer to:

- Diminution, a musical term
- Diminutive
- Diminution (satire)
- Diminution (risk management)
- Chromatin diminution
