= Paradiastole =

Reframing of a vice as a virtue

Paradiastole, in a trope sense, (from Greek παραδιαστολή from παρά para "next to, alongside", and διαστολή diastole "separation, distinction") is the reframing of a vice as a virtue, often with the use of euphemism, for example, "Yes, I know it does not work all the time, but that is what makes it interesting." It is often used ironically.

Paradiastole has been described as "the rhetorical technique of evaluative redescription – more popularly known as euphemism and dysphemism – designed to enlarge or reduce the moral significance of something". It can be distinguished from mere euphemism when a contrast is juxtaposed that has an aim to be tangibly optimistic, such as banally referring to manual labour as a "workout". In the popular adage within computer science, "It's not a bug; it's a feature!", the distinction is made both euphemistically and literally, as many features in software originated as bugs.

In ethics, paradiastole takes the form of advice. For example, the aphorism "all that glitters is not gold" is an ironic illustration that although a thing may have some positive qualities, it may still be undesirable.

In rhetoric, it forms a semantic argument (by asserting that a thing can be referred to using one precise term and not another, in order to establish a coherent point of reference). It can be compared with antithesis except that in paradiastole there is a contrast between two terms, not two ideas.

In narrative, it can be contrasted with dramatic irony, in which characters for their part are unaware of there being a dichotomy; and it can contribute to direct characterization for the purpose of character development (for example, with the line “We’re a rescue team. Not assassins” (Note: From the 1987 film Predator), a character avows a set of priorities).

== Usage to describe a list ==
In studies on classical antiquity, it has come to mean the repetition of disjunctive words in a list.

In biblical studies, paradiastole is a type of anaphora (the repetition of one word at the beginning of successive clauses). Paradiastole uses certain words – either, or, neither, not, and nor – as disjunctions. A disjunction differs from a conjunction in that it separates things, whereas a conjunction joins them.

An example of this technique can be found in the Gospel of John, clarifying the meaning of τέκνα θεοῦ (God's children):

οἳ [πιστεύοντες]
οὐκ ἐξ αἱμάτων
οὐδὲ ἐκ θελήματος σαρκὸς
οὐδὲ ἐκ θελήματος ἀνδρὸς
ἀλλ' ἐκ θεοῦ ἐγεννήθησαν. (John 1.13).

They [the believers],
not of blood,
nor of the flesh's desire,
nor of a man's desire,
but of God were born.

In this passage, οὐκ and οὐδὲ (here translated not and nor) function as the disjunctions. The paradiastole emphasizes that those who believed (οἳ πιστεύοντες) and became "God's children" were not physically ("of blood", etc.) born again, but divinely. Note also the connection with apophatic theology here.

The French Enlightenment writer Voltaire once used paradiastole sardonically: "This agglomeration which was called and which still calls itself the Holy Roman Empire was neither holy, nor Roman, nor an empire."

== See also ==
- Litotes
- Meiosis (figure of speech)
