= Exaggeration =

Statement that represents something in an excessive manner

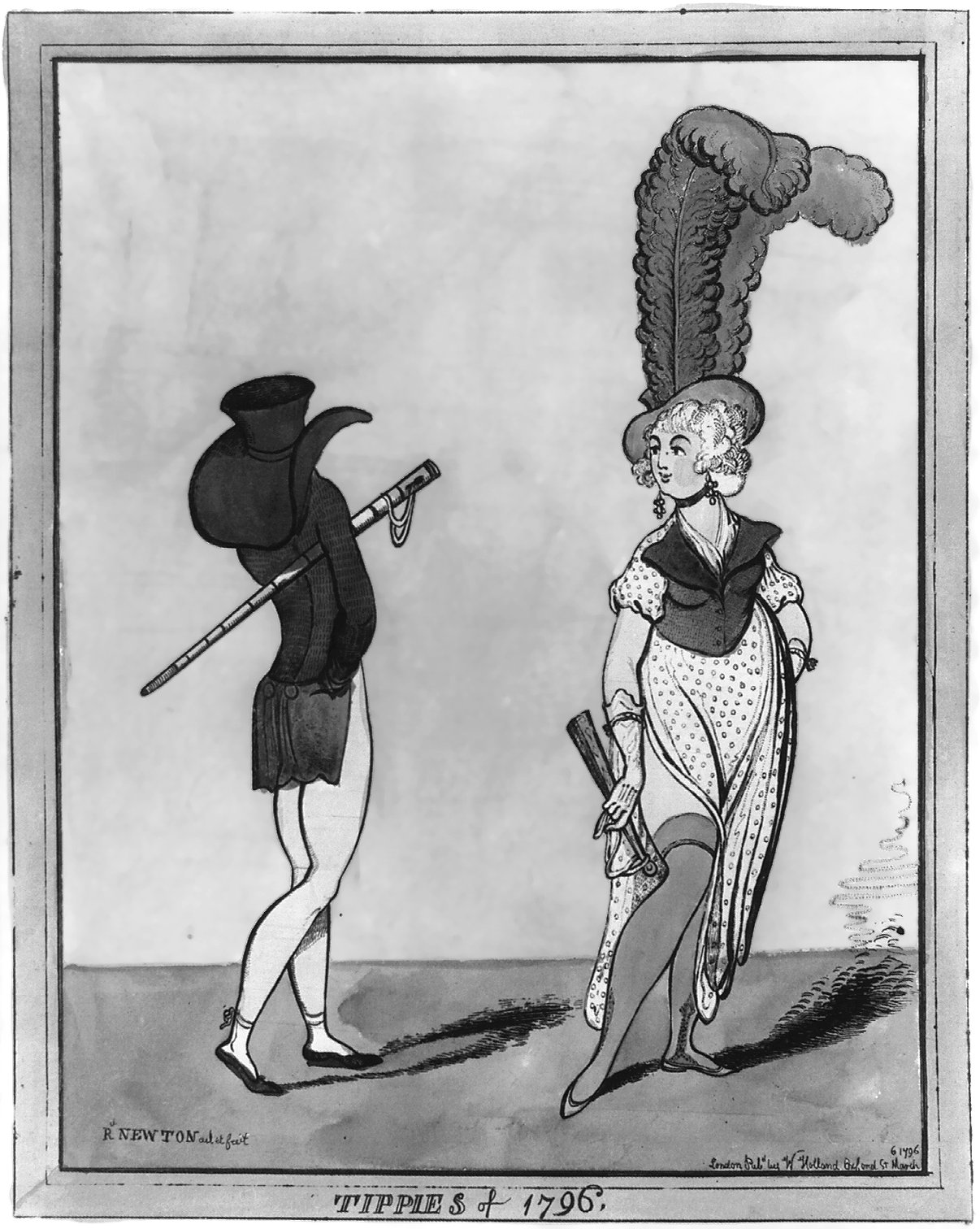
1796 fashion caricature by Richard Newton: the period's fashions of tight trousers for men, and one or two feathers in a woman's headdress, are both parodied through exaggeration.

Exaggeration is the representation of something as more extreme or dramatic than it is, intentionally or unintentionally. It can be a rhetorical device or figure of speech, used to evoke strong feelings or to create a strong impression.

Amplifying achievements, obstacles and problems to seek attention is an everyday occurrence. Inflating the difficulty of achieving a goal after attaining it, can be used to bolster self-esteem.

In the arts, exaggerations are used to create emphasis or effect. As a literary device, exaggerations are often used in poetry, and is frequently encountered in casual speech. Many times the usages of hyperbole describe something as better or worse than it really is. An example of hyperbole is: "The bag weighed a ton." Hyperbole makes the point that the bag was very heavy, though it probably does not weigh a ton.

Exaggerating is also a type of deception, as well as a means of malingering – magnifying small injuries or discomforts as an excuse to avoid responsibilities.

== Etymology ==
The word has origins in the mid-16th century: from Latin exaggerat- 'heaped up', from the verb exaggerare, from ex- 'thoroughly' + aggerare 'heap up' (from agger 'heap'). The word originally meant 'pile up, accumulate', later 'intensify praise or blame', giving rise to current senses.

== In the arts ==
The exaggerator has been a familiar figure in Western culture since at least Aristotle's discussion of the alazon.

=== Expressionism ===
Harold Bloom describes expressionist art as attempting to "intensify the expression of feeling and attitude by exaggeration". Harold Osborne writes that in its wake, even the "new and hard realism...kept much of the distortion and exaggeration which had been one of the chief devices of earlier Expressionism".

=== Tragedy ===
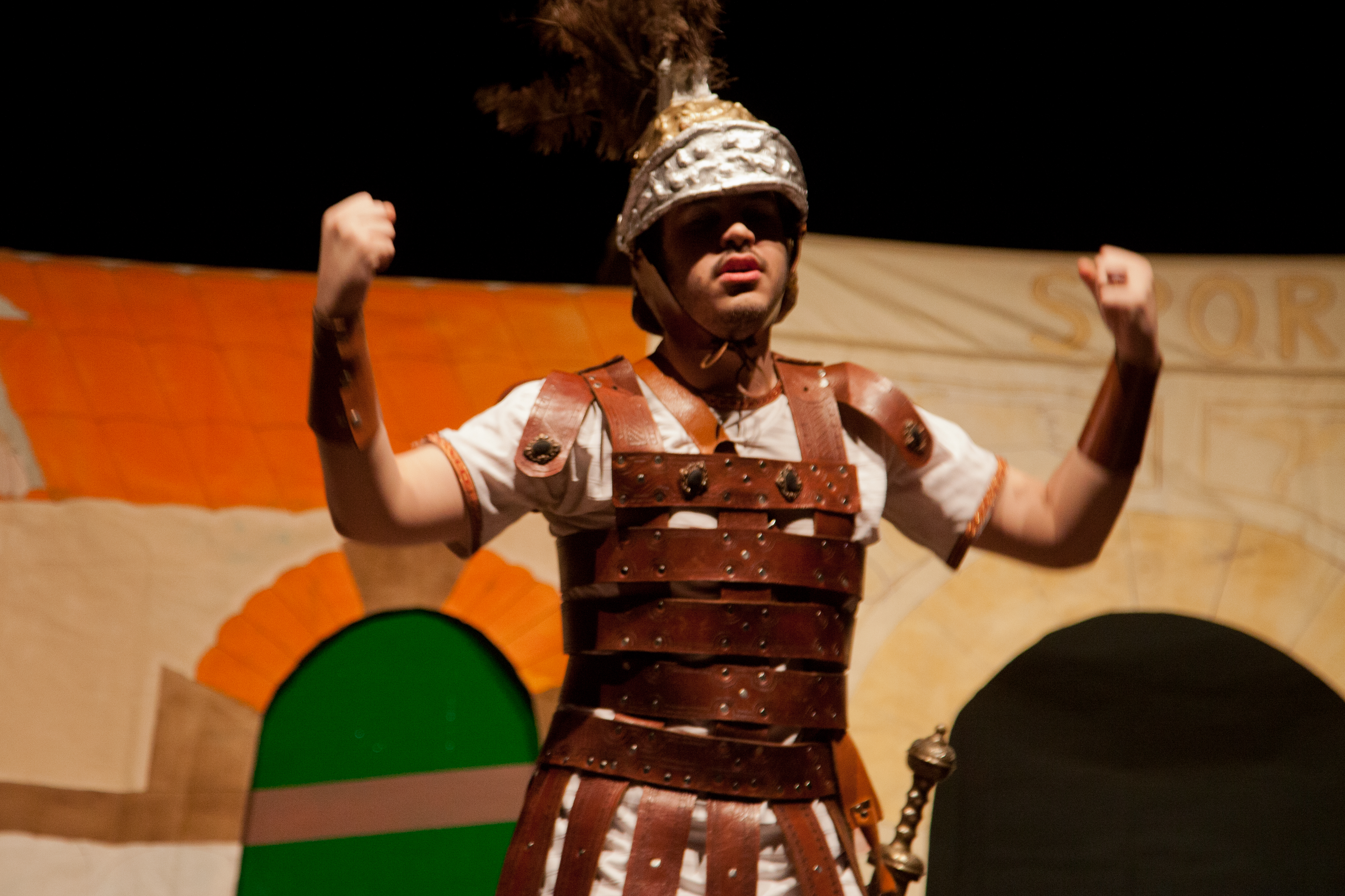
The "braggart soldier" Pyrgopolynices in a 2012 production of the play Miles Gloriosus

Although primarily a comic figure, the boastful alazon may be one aspect of the tragic hero as well: the touch of miles gloriosus ("braggart soldier") in Tamburlaine, even in Othello, has been commented upon, as has the touch of the obsessed philosopher in Faustus and Hamlet'.

=== Humour ===
Emil Draitser writes that "Some theoreticians of the comic consider exaggeration to be a universal comic device." It may take different forms in different genres, but in the words of M. Eastman and W. Fry, all rely on the fact that 'the easiest way to make things laughable is to exaggerate to the point of absurdity their salient traits'.

A caricature is a type of portrait that exaggerates or distorts the essence of a person or thing to create an easily identifiable visual likeness: Filippo Baldinucci describes this as "disproportionately increasing and emphasizing the defects of the features". In literature, a caricature is a description of a person using exaggeration of some characteristics and oversimplification of others.

Slapstick is the recourse to humor involving exaggerated physical activity which exceeds the boundaries of common sense. These exaggerated depictions are often found in cartoons, and light film comedies aimed at younger audiences.

=== Overacting ===
Overacting is the exaggeration of gestures and speech when acting. It may be unintentional, particularly in the case of a bad actor, or be required for the role. For the latter, it is commonly used in comical situations or to stress the evil characteristics of a villain. Since the perception of acting quality differs between people the extent of overacting can be subjective.

Exaggeration is an effect especially useful for animation, as perfect imitation of reality can look static and dull in cartoons. The level of exaggeration depends on whether one seeks realism or a particular style, like a caricature or the style of a specific artist. The classical definition of exaggeration, employed by Disney, was to remain true to reality, just presenting it in a wilder, more extreme form. Other forms of exaggeration can involve the supernatural or surreal, alterations in the physical features of a character; or elements in the storyline itself. It is important to employ a certain level of restraint when using exaggeration. If a scene contains several elements, there should be a balance in how those elements are exaggerated in relation to each other, to avoid confusing or overawing the viewer.

=== Shock jockery ===
A shock jock, a type of radio broadcaster or disc jockey, entertains listeners or attracts attention using humor or melodramatic exaggeration that some portion of the listening audience may find offensive.

== In journalism ==
Schopenhauer saw exaggeration as essential to journalism. He may have overstated this case, but yellow journalism thrived on exaggeration, and fact-checking and independent verification have not succeeded in suppressing clickbait or hyperbolic headlines.

== In politics ==
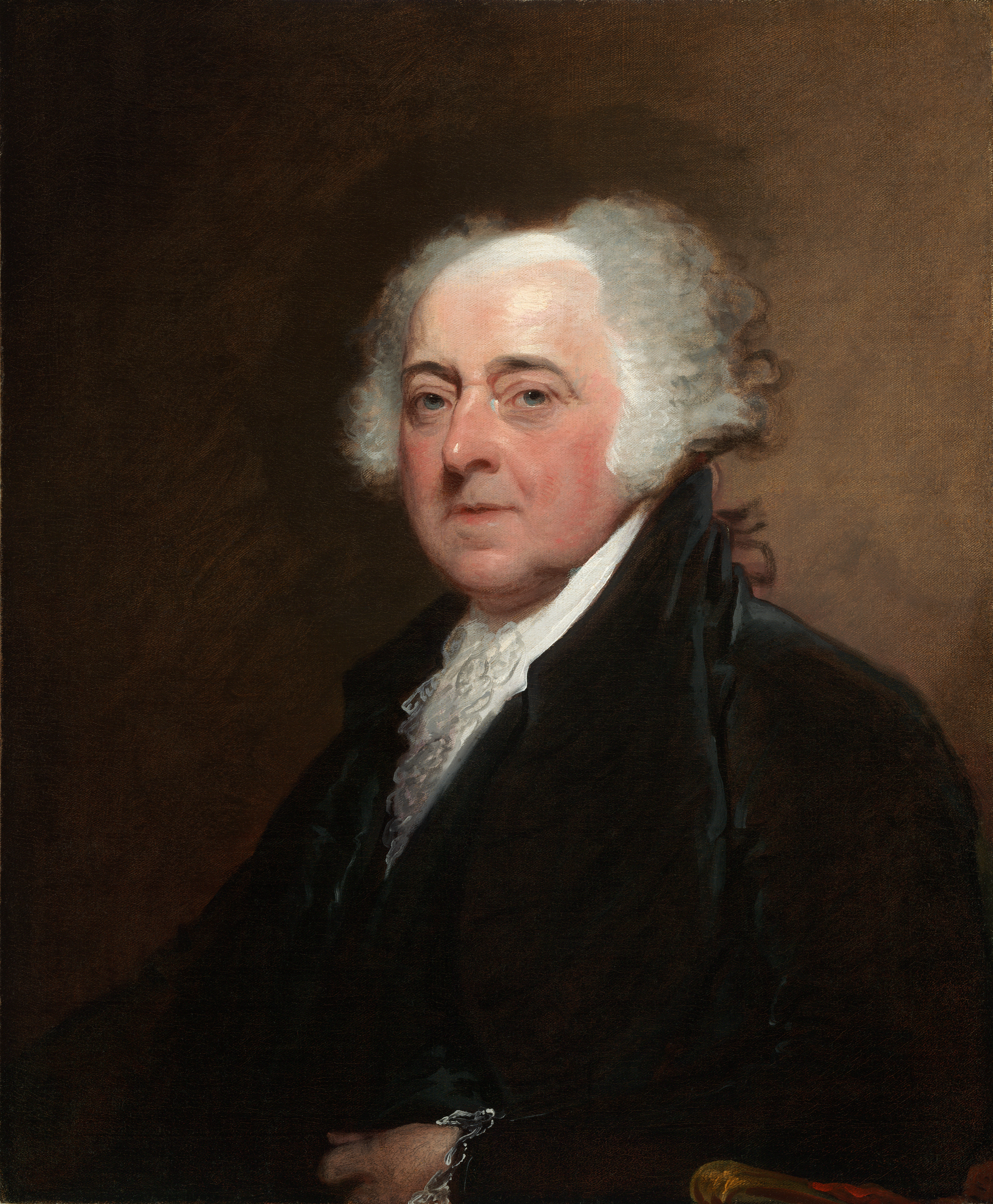
During the election of 1800, surrogates of John Adams' political campaign warned voters that if Thomas Jefferson won the election, "murder, robbery, rape, adultery and incest will openly be taught and practiced."

Politicians can exaggerate. In the electoral process one may expect exaggeration. Outside, the exaggerations of propaganda can bolster an incumbent's position.

== In psychology ==
People with the following mental health issues are prone to make exaggerated representations:

- Factitious disorder/malingering,
- Substance related and addictive disorders
- Acute stress disorder,
- Post traumatic stress disorder,
- Avoidant personality disorder, and
- Narcissistic personality disorder.

Factitious disorder is when a person acts as if they have a physical or psychological illness. People with this disorder created the symptoms and are willing to undergo painful or risky tests to get sympathy and special attention.

== In popular culture ==
In 1969, The Monty Python Dirty Fork sketch demonstrates an absurd level of catastrophization where restaurant staff commit suicide and murder each other because of a customer complaint of a dirty fork. Compare with the scene in the film Monty Python and the Holy Grail involving the Black Knight character which is the opposite extreme of absurdity (minimisation).

== See also ==
- Caricature
- Hyperbole
- Overacting
- Sensationalism
- Shock jock
- Tall tale
