= Understatement =

Stylistic device

Understatement is an expression of lesser strength than what the speaker or writer actually means or than what is normally expected. It is the opposite of embellishment or exaggeration, and is used for emphasis, irony, hedging, or humor. A particular form of understatement using negative syntax is called litotes. This is not to be confused with euphemism, where a polite phrase is used in place of a harsher or more offensive expression.

Understatement may also be called underexaggeration to denote lesser enthusiasm. Understatement also merges the comic with the ironic, as in Mark Twain's comment, "The report of my death was an exaggeration."

== Use by the English ==
Understatement is often used rhetorically to emphasize a point. It is a staple of humour in English-speaking cultures. For example, in Monty Python's The Meaning of Life, an Army officer has just lost his leg. When asked how he feels, he looks down at his bloody stump and responds, "Stings a bit."

The well-known Victorian critique of Cleopatra's behaviour as exemplified in Sarah Bernhardt's performance in Antony and Cleopatra: "How different, how very different, from the home life of our own dear Queen!".

In April 1951, during the Battle of the Imjin River of the Korean War, 650 British fighting men – soldiers and officers from the 1st Battalion, the Gloucestershire Regiment – were deployed on the most important crossing on the river to block the traditional invasion route to Seoul. The Chinese had sent an entire division – 10,000 men – to smash the isolated Glosters aside in a major offensive to take the whole Korean peninsula, and the small force was gradually surrounded and overwhelmed. After two days' fighting, an American, Major General Robert H Soule, asked the British brigadier, Thomas Brodie: "How are the Glosters doing?" The brigadier, schooled in Britain and thus British humour, replied: "A bit sticky, things are pretty sticky down there." To American ears, this did not sound desperate, and so he ordered them to stand fast. Only 40 Glosters managed to escape.

During the Kuala-Lumpur-to-Perth leg of British Airways Flight 9 on 24 June 1982, volcanic ash caused all four engines of the Boeing 747 aircraft to fail. Although pressed for time as the aircraft rapidly lost altitude, Captain Eric Moody still managed to make an announcement to the passengers: "Ladies and gentlemen, this is your captain speaking. We have a small problem. All four engines have stopped. We are doing our damnedest to get them going again. I trust you are not in too much distress."

== See also ==
- Hyperbole
- Litotes
- Meiosis (figure of speech)
- Minimisation (psychology)
