= Diminution (satire) =

Satirical technique

Diminution is a satirical technique that aims to belittle a subject via description. The term, derived from "diminutive" meaning "small," was defined by critic John M. Bullitt as "speech which tends, either by the force of low or vulgar imagery, or by other suggestion, to depress an object below its usually accepted status." According to Bullitt, diminution can take the form of "ugly or homely images," comparisons to subjects considered to be inferior (with the implication that the thing being compared is inferior as well), focusing on a person's unappealing physical features, or using irony, meiosis, or litotes.

Bullitt used the term to describe the writing of satirist Jonathan Swift -- for example, the associations of humans with animals Gulliver's Travels and "A Modest Proposal." The term has since been associated with Flannery O'Connor, Mark Twain, Henry Fielding, and Oliver Goldsmith.
