= Antiphrasis =

Rhetorical device

Antiphrasis is the rhetorical device of saying the opposite of what is actually meant in such a way that it is obvious what the true intention is.

Some authors treat and use antiphrasis just as irony, euphemism or litotes.

When the antiphrasal use is very common, the word can become an auto-antonym, having opposite meanings depending on context. For example, Spanish dichoso originally meant "fortunate, blissful" as in tierra dichosa, "fortunate land", but it acquired the ironic and colloquial meaning of "infortunate, bothersome" as in ¡Dichosas moscas!, "Damned flies!".

== Etymology ==
Antiphrasis is a Greek word which means 'opposite words'.

== Antiphrasis as euphemism ==
Some euphemisms are antiphrasis, such as "Eumenides" 'the gracious ones' to mean the Erinyes, deities of vengeance.

== Examples ==
- "Take your time, we've got all day", meaning "hurry up, we don't have all day".
- "Tell me about it", in the sense of "don't bother, I already know".
- "Great!", an exclamation uttered when something unpleasant had happened or is about to happen.

== See also ==
- Contronym
- Irony
- Litotes
- Sarcasm
- Satire
