= Overacting =

Acting in an exaggerated way

Overacting (also called hamming, mugging or chewing the scenery) is exaggerated acting, positively or negatively.

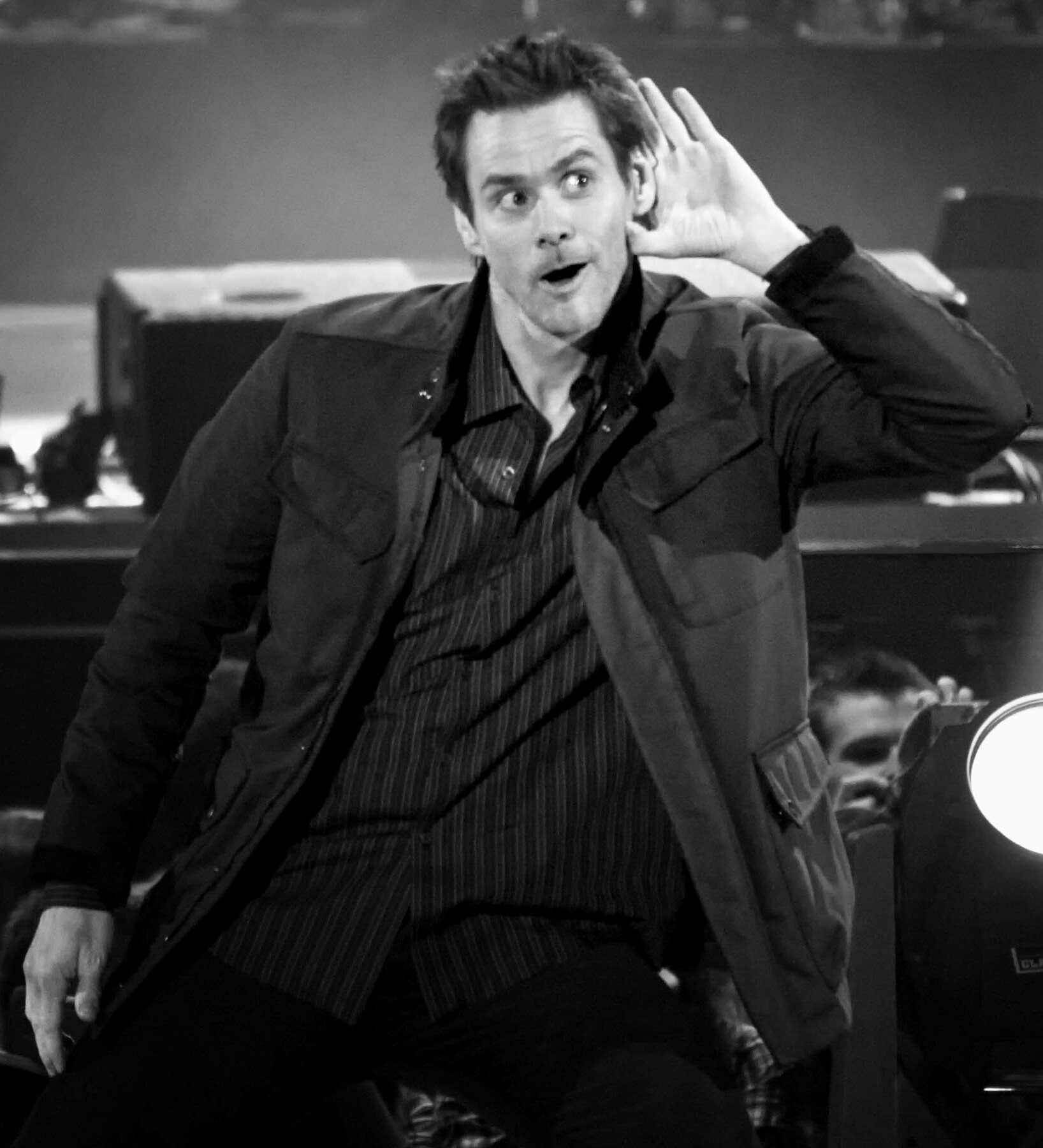
Carrey in 2008

== Uses ==
Some roles require overly exaggerated character acting, particularly those in comedy films. For example, the breakthrough roles of Jim Carrey in Ace Ventura: Pet Detective and The Mask (both 1994) saw him portray the lead characters in a very flamboyant fashion, as the script required. He has since played relatively straight roles.

Overacting may be used to portray an outlandish character, or to stress the evil characteristics of a villain. Actor Gary Oldman was almost typecast as an anti-social personality early in his screen career: the necessity to express villainous characters in an overtly physical manner led to the cultivation of a "big" acting style that incorporated projection skills acquired during his stage training. He noted that he has given "over-the-top" performances, and: "If it's coming from a sincere place, then I think the screen can hold the epic, and it can hold the very, very small."

Robert Duvall felt it is often appropriate for an actor to "go big" onscreen. He said, "If you do that within the confines of your temperament, then you can go broad. And sometimes when people really are within the confines of their temperament in a broad way, people say they're overacting – and they're not... A broad moment can be just as valid as a quiet moment."

Actor Al Pacino, when challenged with the notion that he overacts, answered: "Well, all actors do, in a way. You know what they say: in the theater you have to reach the balcony." Pacino suggested that directors serve to rein in screen performances that are too large.

== Reactions ==
In an article on overacting, Independent critic Leigh Singer wrote: "Unlike theatre's declamatory projecting to the back row, a 'stagey' performance onscreen isn't a compliment... ultimately, it really is a matter of personal taste." Jeff Labrecque of Entertainment Weekly argued that "there's a thin line between overacting (bad) and acting that you're overacting (bizarrely genius)"; the publication at one time gave year-end awards for "best" and "worst" overacting in film, with the aforementioned Oldman and Pacino winning the former for their performances in Léon: The Professional (1994) and The Devil's Advocate (1997), respectively. Guardian journalist Chris Michael, a proponent of overacting, wrote: "From Hugo Weaving's Agent Smith to Heath Ledger's Joker to the entire oeuvre of William Shatner, mannered or stylised acting is an underrated skill."

== See also ==
- B movie
- Melodrama
