= Hyperbole =

Rhetorical device

Hyperbole (/haɪˈpɜːrbəli/ hy-PUR-bə-lee; adj. hyperbolic /ˌhaɪpərˈbɒlɪk/ HY-pur-BOL-ick) is the use of exaggeration as a rhetorical device or figure of speech. In rhetoric, it is also sometimes known as auxesis (literally 'growth'). In poetry and oratory, it emphasizes, evokes strong feelings, and creates strong impressions. As a figure of speech, it is usually not meant to be taken literally.

== Etymology ==
'Hyperbole' is derived from the Ancient Greek: ὑπερβολή huperbolḗ by way of Latin. The word is composed from ὑπέρ hupér 'above, beyond' and βάλλω bállō 'throw'.

Unlike most English words beginning with hyper-, it is stressed on the second syllable. The first known use is in the 15th century.

== Usage ==
Hyperbole is often used for emphasis or effect. In casual speech, it functions as an intensifier: saying "the bag weighed a ton" simply means that the bag was extremely heavy. The rhetorical device may be used for serious or ironic or comic effects. Understanding hyperbole and its use in context can help understand the speaker's point. Hyperbole generally conveys feelings or emotions from the speaker, or from those who the speaker may talk about. It can be used in a form of humor, all depending on the context in which the speaker uses it.

=== US case law ===
Rhetorical hyperbole is defined as "extravagant exaggeration employed for rhetorical effect" for First Amendment purposes. Greenbelt Cooperative Pub. Ass'n v. Bresler (1970), Letter Carriers v. Austin (1974) and Milkovich v. Lorain Journal Co. (1989) are notable cases. In Watts v. United States (1969) the defendant was absolved of federal anti-threat punishment for saying "the first person he would put in his scope is L.B.J."; the court found this to be "political hyperbole".

=== In literature ===
Hyperbole has been used throughout literature for many centuries. Heroic drama, which is drama with an emphasis on grandeur and excess, often makes use of hyperbole to extend the effect and epic nature of the genre. Modern tall tales also make use of hyperbole to exaggerate the feats and characteristics of their protagonists. For example, the American tall tale about Paul Bunyan relies heavily on hyperbole to establish Bunyan's giant stature and abilities.

For hyperbole to be effective it needs to be obvious, deliberate, and outlandish. Using hyperbolic speech as a character trait can denote an unreliable narrator.

Emerson's Concord Hymn uses hyperbole in the lines "Here once the embattled farmers stood / And fired the shot heard round the world."

In Kurt Vonnegut's Slaughterhouse-Five, the protagonist emerges from his shelter to find total destruction, and makes the hyperbolic statement that "Dresden was like the moon now, nothing but minerals." The hyperbole conveys how completely the city was ruined.

=== Literally ===
One of the most frequently used hyperboles in English is the word literally. It became a controversial issue when millennials began to convolute literally by using the word to artificially substantiate a position. Many dictionaries now document the meaning as "to acknowledge that something is not literally true but is used for emphasis or to express strong feeling". Hence, literally has become one of the primary ways to exaggerate and hyperbolize a statement.

=== Common examples ===
- He was so angry, I thought he was going to kill somebody.
- She had a thousand missed calls.
- I was so embarrassed, I wanted to die.

== See also ==
- Adynaton, an impossible form of hyperbole
- Figure of speech
- Litotes and meiosis, forms of deliberate understatement
- Tautology (language)
