= List of calques =

A calque /kælk/ or loan translation is a word or phrase borrowed from another language by literal, word-for-word (Latin: verbum pro verbo) translation. This list contains examples of calques in various languages.

== English ==
=== From Mandarin Chinese ===
- Running dog calques Chinese: 走狗; pinyin: zǒu gǒu.
- brainwashing calques Chinese: 洗腦; pinyin: xǐ nǎo – usage via U.S. military during Korean War.
- lose face calques Chinese: 丟臉; pinyin: diū liǎn
- Paper tiger calques Chinese: 紙老虎; pinyin: zhǐ lǎohǔ
- Potsticker calques Chinese: 鍋貼; pinyin: guōtiē
- Long time no see calques Chinese: 好久不見; pinyin: hǎojiǔ bùjiàn.

=== From French ===
- By heart (or off by heart) probably calques Middle French par cœur
- Free verse calques vers libre
- Old Guard calques Vieille Garde (the most senior regiments of the Imperial Guard of Napoleon I)
- Flea market calques marché aux puces
- Marriage of convenience calques French mariage de convenance
- New Wave (artistic period) calques Nouvelle Vague
- rhinestone calques caillou du Rhin lit. 'Rhine pebble'
- that goes without saying calques cela va sans dire
- Forget-me-not calques Old French ne m'oubliez mye
- crime of passion from crime passionnel
- J. R. R. Tolkien used the name "Bag End" as a calque of "cul-de-sac", to poke fun at the British use of French terms.

=== From German or Dutch ===
- Masterpiece: probably translation of Dutch meesterstuk or German Meisterstück: Dutch meester and German Meister, 'master' + Dutch stuk and German Stück, 'piece of work'. (The Dutch translation of masterpiece is meesterwerk, the German translation is Meisterwerk. A Meisterstück is the craftwork that serves as a sort of "thesis" for a master craftsman-to-be.)

==== From Dutch ====
- Iceberg from the Dutch ijsberg
- Superconductor calques Dutch supergeleider
- Pineapple calques Dutch pijnappel, which calques French pomme de pin (both meaning 'pinecone')
- freebooter calques Dutch vrijbuiter

==== From German ====
- Antibody calques Antikörper
- Assault rifle calques Sturmgewehr
- Ball lightning calques Kugelblitz
- Beer garden calques Biergarten
- Concertmaster and concertmeister calque Konzertmeister
- Earworm calques Ohrwurm
- Flamethrower calques Flammenwerfer
- Foreword perhaps calques Vorwort, which itself calques Latin præfatio (from præ- 'before' plus fari 'speak') "preface"
- Heroic tenor calques Heldentenor
- Intelligence quotient calques Intelligenzquotient
- Loan translation calques Lehnübersetzung
- Loanword calques Lehnwort
- Nostalgia (formed from Greek νόστος 'homecoming' plus ἄλγος 'pain') calques Heimweh lit. 'home sore'
- Overman and superman (i.e., self-transcending human) calque Übermensch
- Power politics calques Machtpolitik
- Rainforest calques Regenwald
- Standpoint ('point of view') calques Standpunkt
- Superego (formed from Latin super- 'over, above' plus ego 'I') calques Überich lit. 'over-I'
- Stormtroopers calques Sturmtruppen
- Subliminal (formed from Latin sub-, 'below', plus limen (gen. liminis, 'threshold') calques unterschwellig, lit. 'beneath the threshold'
- Thought experiment calques Gedankenexperiment
- Watershed calques Wasserscheide
- Worldview calques German Weltanschauung

=== From Hebrew ===
- Scapegoat is a calque of עזאזל (Azazel) as ez ozel (lit. 'the goat that departs', hence '[e]scape goat'). This neologism is attributed to Tyndale's 1530 Bible translation.
- Passover calques, somewhat phonologically, פֶּסַח Pesaḥ.

=== From Latin ===
- Commonplace calques locus commūnis (referring to a generally applicable literary passage), which itself is a calque of Greek koinos topos
- Devil's advocate calques advocātus diabolī, referring to an official appointed to present arguments against a proposed canonization or beatification in the Catholic Church
- Wisdom tooth calques dēns sapientiae, which in turn calques Arabic aḍrāsu 'lḥikmi, which calques Greek σωΦρονιστῆρες used by Hippocrates.
- Milky Way calques via lactea
- Rest in peace calques requiescat in pace
- In a nutshell calques in nuce

=== From Spanish ===
- Blue-blood calques sangre azul
- Fifth column calques quinta columna
- Killer whale from ballena asesina
- Moment of truth calques el momento de la verdad, the final sword thrust in a bullfight.

=== From other languages ===
- Deep state calques Turkish: derin devlet
- Gospel calques Ancient Greek: εὐαγγέλιον (evangelion lit. 'good news')
- Hotdish calques Scandinavian varmrett/varmrätt
- ground nut calques Tamil: நிலக்கடலை (nila kadalai)
- The Littlejohn adaptor calques the Czech name of the inventor František Janeček
- Many words and phrases calqued by Latin from Greek have been borrowed into English.

== Latin ==
=== From Greek ===
Latin calques many terms from Greek, many of which have been borrowed by English.

- compassion calques συμπάθεια (sympathia) 'sympathy' (Latin: lit. 'suffering with', Greek: lit. 'suffering together')
- deus ex machina calques ἀπὸ μηχανῆς θεός (apo mechanēs theos) (Latin: lit. 'god out of the machine', Greek: lit. 'out of the machine, god')
- insectus calques ἔντομον (entomon) ('insect', from words meaning "to cut into" in the respective languages)
- locus communis calques κοινὸς τόπος, and was later calqued in English as commonplace
- musculus 'muscle' (= 'common house mouse', lit. 'little mouse' from mus 'mouse') calques μῦς (mys) 'muscle' (= 'mouse')
- magnanimus calques μεγαλόψυχος (megalopsychos) ('great-souled')
- quinta essentia calques πέμπτη οὐσία.
- quod erat demonstrandum 'which was to be demonstrated' is a calque of ὅπερ ἔδει δεῖξαι (hoper edei deixai) 'what needed to be [shown] has been shown'.
- similaris 'similar' calques ὁμοιομερής.
- Many grammatical terms: participium 'participle' from μετοχή, declinationem 'declension' from κλίσις, etc.

== Romance languages ==
Examples of Romance language expressions calqued from foreign languages include:

- French lune de miel, Catalan lluna de mel, Spanish luna de miel, Portuguese lua-de-mel, Italian luna di miele and Romanian luna de miere calque English honeymoon
- French gratte-ciel, Catalan gratacels, Spanish rascacielos, Portuguese arranha-céus, Romanian zgârie-nori and Italian grattacielo calque English skyscraper
- French sabot de Denver calques English Denver boot
- French jardin d'enfants, Spanish jardín de infancia and Portuguese Jardim de infância calque German Kindergarten (lit. 'children's garden')
- Spanish baloncesto and Italian pallacanestro calque English basketball
- Spanish balonvolea and Italian pallavolo calque English volleyball

=== French ===
- French courriel (contraction of courrier électronique) calques English email (contraction of electronic mail)
- French disque dur calques English hard disk
- French carte mère calques English motherboard
- French eau de vie calques Latin aqua vitae
- French en ligne calques English online
- French hors-ligne (literally: "out of line, off line") calques English offline
- French haute résolution calques English high resolution
- French haute tension calques English high voltage
- French disque compact calques English compact disc
- French haute fidélité calques English hi-fi (high fidelity)
- French large bande calques English broadband
- French modulation de fréquence calques English frequency modulation (FM)
- French média de masse calques English mass media
- French seconde main calques English second hand
- French sortir du placard calques English to come out of the closet
- French surhomme calques German Übermensch (Nietzsche's concept)
- French souris calques English mouse (computer peripheral)
- French OVNI (Objet Volant Non Identifié) calques English UFO (Unidentified Flying Object)
- In some dialects of French, the English term "weekend" becomes la fin de semaine ("the end of week"), a calque, but in some it is left untranslated as le week-end, a loanword.
- French cor anglais (lit. 'English horn') is a near-calque of English French horn. In English cor anglais refers to a completely different musical instrument.

=== Spanish ===
Many calques found in Southwestern US Spanish come from English:

- Spanish escuela alta calques English high school (secundaria or escuela secundaria in Standard Spanish)
- Spanish grado (de escuela) calques English grade (in school) (nota in Standard Spanish)
- Spanish manzana de Adán calques English Adam's apple (nuez de Adán, meaning lit. 'Adam's nut', in standard Spanish), which in turn is a calque of French pomme d'Adam

Also technological terms calqued from English are used throughout the Spanish-speaking world:

- Spanish rascacielos calques English skyscraper
- Spanish tarjeta de crédito calques English credit card
- Spanish alta tecnología calques English high technology
- Spanish disco compacto calques English compact disc
- Spanish correo electrónico calques English electronic mail
- Spanish alta resolución calques English high resolution
- Spanish enlace calques English link (Internet)
- Spanish ratón calques English mouse (computer)
- Spanish nave espacial calques English spaceship
- Spanish en un momento dado calques Dutch op een gegeven moment ('At a certain moment')
- Spanish Red Mundial calques English World Wide Web
- Spanish videograbadora calques English VCR (contraction of videocassette recorder)

=== Italian ===
- Italian aria condizionata calques English air conditioned
- Italian fine settimana calques English week-end
- Italian ferrovia ('railway', lit. 'iron road') calques French Chemin de fer or the German Eisenbahn

== Germanic languages ==
=== Afrikaans and Dutch ===
- Afrikaans aartappel and Dutch aardappel calque French pomme de terre (English potato lit. 'earth apple')
- Afrikaans besigheid calques English business
- Afrikaans e-pos calques English e-mail
- Afrikaans hardeskyf and Dutch harde schijf calque English hard disk
- Afrikaans klankbaan calques English sound track
- Afrikaans kleurskyfie calques English colour slide
- Afrikaans sleutelbord calques English keyboard
- Afrikaans tuisblad calques English homepage
- Afrikaans wolkekrabber and Dutch wolkenkrabber calque German Wolkenkratzer (which itself calques English sky scraper).
- Afrikaans melkskommel calques English milkshake
- Afrikaans werkswinkel calques English workshop
- Afrikaans geheuestokkie calques English memory stick
- Afrikaans biertuin calques German Biergarten (probably via English beer garden)

=== German ===
- Fußball calques English football, referring specifically to association football
- Teddybär calques English teddy bear
- Wolkenkratzer calques English skyscraper
- Entwickeln calques French développer
- Flutlicht calques English floodlight
- Datenverarbeitung calques English data processing
- Großmutter and Großvater calques French grand-mère and grand-père (replacing original Ahn, Ähnin which now mean "forbear")
- Rundreise calques French tournée
- Fernsehen calques English television (from the Greek affix tele- 'far' and Latin visio 'sight')
- Fernsprecher calques English telephone (more frequently called with the loanword Telefon)
- Löwenzahn calques French dent-de-lion (dandelion, lit. 'lion's tooth')
- Überleben calques Latin supervivo (survive, lit. 'overlive', which is a synonym of survive)
- Treppenwitz calques French l'esprit de l'escalier (lit. 'staircase wit')
- herunterladen calques English download
- Wochenende calques English weekend (which actually was first used as a foreign word, but now has been all but replaced by the calque)

=== Icelandic ===
- Icelandic rafmagn, 'electricity', is a half-calqued coinage that literally means 'amber power'.
  - raf translates the Greek root ἤλεκτρον (ḗlektron), which means "amber"
  - magn, 'power', is descriptive of electricity's nature but not a direct calque from the source word "electricity"
- samviska ('conscience').
- One of the early suggestions for an Icelandic translation of helicopter was þyrilvængja, lit. 'twirling wings', a calque of the Greek helico-pteron. This was later replaced with þyrla.

=== Dano-Norwegian ===
Note: From a technical standpoint, Danish and the bokmål standard of Norwegian are the same language, with minor spelling and pronunciation differences (equivalent to British and American English). For this reason, they will share a section.

- Danish børnehave and Norwegian barnehage calque German Kindergarten: barne = børne = Kinder = children; hage = have = Garten = garden
- hjemmeside calques English home page.
- Danish hjerneflugt and Norwegian hjerneflukt (lit. 'brain flight') calque English brain drain.
- Danish idiotsikker calques English foolproof.
- loppemarked calques French marché aux puces ('flea market', itself a calque from the French).
- mandag ('Monday'), from Old Norse mánadagr (lit. 'moon day') calques Latin dies lunæ.
- Danish overhoved and Norwegian overhode ('head of a family, chief') calques German Oberhaupt (ober 'over'; Haupt 'head').
- Danish samvittighed and Norwegian samvittighet ('conscience') calques Latin (through Low German) conscientia (com 'with'; scire 'to know').
  - From sam- ('co-') and vittig (today meaning 'funny' but which stems from Low German, where it meant 'reasonable', related to vite ('to know') and English wit.)
- Norwegian tenåring calques English teenager: femten = fifteen, åring = annual harvest

=== Swedish ===
- skyskrapa calques English skyscraper.
- stora smällen calques English the big bang
- tonåring calques English teen-ager: femton = fifteen, åring = annual harvest

== Slavic languages ==
=== Serbian ===
- Serbian misliti izvan kutije calques English to think outside of the box:
  - Sr. misliti = to think
  - Sr. izvan = outside
  - Sr. kutija = box

=== Macedonian ===
- Macedonian ракопис (rakopis) calques Latin-derived manuscript and handwriting:
  - Mac. root рака (raka) = Lat. manus = 'hand'
  - Mac. root пис- (pis-) = Lat. scribo = 'to write'
- Macedonian правопис (pravopis) calques Greek-derived orthography:
  - Mac. root право (pravo) = Gr. ορθός (orthos) = 'correct';
  - Mac. root пис- (pis-) = Gr. γράφειν (graphein) = 'to write'
- Macedonian православие (pravoslavie) calques Greek-derived 'orthodoxy':
  - Mac. root право (pravo) = Gr. ορθός (orthos) = 'correct';
  - Mac. root славие (slavie) = Gr. δοξα (doxa) = 'glorification'

In more recent times, the Macedonian language has calqued new words from other prestige languages including German, French and English.

- Macedonian натчовек (natčovek) = calques German-derived 'overman' (Übermensch)
  - Mac. root над- (nad-) = Ger. über = 'over'
  - Mac. root човек (čovek, 'man') = Ger. Mensch = 'people'
- Macedonian облакодер (oblakoder) = calques English skyscraper:
  - Mac. root облак (oblak, 'cloud')
  - Mac. root дере (dere, 'to flay')
- Macedonian клучен збор (klučen zbor) = calques English keyword:
  - Mac. root клуч (kluč, 'key')
  - Mac. root збор (zbor, 'word')

Some words were originally calqued into Russian and then absorbed into Macedonian, considering the close relatedness of the two languages. Therefore, many of these calques can also be considered Russianisms.

=== Russian ===
The poet Aleksandr Pushkin (1799–1837) was perhaps the most influential among the Russian literary figures who would transform the modern Russian language and vastly expand its ability to handle abstract and scientific concepts by importing the sophisticated vocabulary of Western intellectuals.

Although some Western vocabulary entered the language as loanwords – e.g., Italian salvietta, 'napkin', was simply Russified in sound and spelling to салфетка (salfetka) – Pushkin and those he influenced most often preferred to render foreign borrowings into Russian by calquing. Compound words were broken down to their component roots, which were then translated piece-by-piece to their Slavic equivalents. But not all of the coinages caught on and became permanent additions to the lexicon; for example, любомудрие (ljubomudrie) was promoted by 19th-century Russian intellectuals as a calque of "philosophy", but the word eventually fell out of fashion, and modern Russian instead uses the loanword философия (filosofija).

- Russian любомудрие (ljubomudrie) calqued Greek-derived philosophy:
  - Russ. root любить (ljubit') = Gr. φιλεῖν (filein) = 'to love';
  - Russ. root мудрость (mudrost') = Gr. σοφία (sofia) = 'wisdom'
- Russian зависимость (zavisimost') calques Latin-derived dependence:
  - Russ. root за (za) = Lat. de = 'down from'
  - Russ. root висеть (viset') = Lat. pendere = 'to hang; to dangle'
- Russian совпадение (sovpadenije) calques Latin-derived coincidence:
  - Russ. prefix со- (so) = Lat. co- = 'in; with; together'
  - Russ. prefix в- (v) = Lat. in- = 'in; into'
  - Russ. root падать (padat') = Lat. cidere = 'to fall'
- Russian полуостров (poluostrov) calques Latin-derived peninsula:
  - Russ. root полу- (polu-) = Ger. halb = 'half; semi-'
  - Russ. root остров (ostrov) = Ger. Insel = 'island'
- Russian детский сад (detskij sad) calques German Kindergarten (both suggesting lit. 'children's garden')

== Greek ==
- Διαδίκτυο from English Internet
- Γύρος (gyros) from Turkish döner
- Ποδόσφαιρο from English football, referring specifically to association football
- Τηλεόραση from television

== Irish ==
- uisce beatha, or 'whiskey', calques Latin aqua vitae

== Finnish ==
Since Finnish, a Uralic language, differs radically in pronunciation and orthography from Indo-European languages, most loans adopted in Finnish either are calques or soon become such as foreign words are translated into Finnish. Examples include:

- from Greek: sarvikuono ('rhinoceros', from Greek ρινόκερος rinokeros),
- from Latin: viisaudenhammas ('wisdom tooth', from Latin dens sapientiae),
- from English: jalkapallo (English 'football', specifically referring to association football),
- from English: koripallo (English 'basketball'),
- from English: kovalevy (English 'hard disk'),
- from French: kirpputori ('flea market', French marché aux puces),
- from German: lastentarha (German Kindergarten),
- from German: panssarivaunu (German Panzerwagen),
- from Swedish: pesukarhu ('raccoon', from Swedish tvättbjörn and ultimately German Waschbär),
- from Swedish: moottoritie (highway, from Swedish motorväg),
- from Chinese: aivopesu (brainwash, from Chinese xi nao),
- from Spanish: siniverinen (blue-blooded, from Spanish de sangre azul)

== Modern Hebrew ==
When Jews immigrate to Israel, they often Hebraize their surnames. One approach to doing so was by calque from the original (often German or Yiddish) surname. For instance, Imi Lichtenfield (itself a half-calque), founder of the martial art Krav Maga, became Imi Sde-Or. Both last names mean "light field". For more examples and other approaches, see the article on Hebraization of surnames.

- mesilat barzel (obsolete term for railway) from German Eisenbahn (lit. 'iron track'); sach-rachok (a proposed term for telephone that became famous for not catching on) from German Fernsprecher (itself a calque from the Greek-derived telephone)
- zarkor ('searchlight') from German Scheinwerfer (lit. 'light-thrower'=>zorek-or, contracted to zarkor)
- iton ('newspaper') from German Zeitung and Yiddish צײַטוּנגtsaytung (Zeit and Et both mean 'time' or 'era', first syllable e become i with the -on suffix)
- tappuach adamah ('potato') from French pomme de terre
- gan yeladim from German Kindergarten
- kaduregel (כדורגל) ('football', specifically association football/soccer) from English football; kadursal ('basketball'); kaduryad ('handball'), etc.
- kelev yam ('seal') from German Seehund (lit. 'sea dog')
- karnaf (contraction of keren af lit. 'nosehorn') from Greek rhinoceros, possibly via German Nashorn
- names of many chemical elements are calqued from German and/or Greek:
  - meiman ('hydrogen') from Wasserstoff
  - pachman ('carbon') from Kohlstoff
  - chankan ('nitrogen') from Stickstoff
  - chamtzan (oxygen) from Sauerstoff
  - zarkhan ('phosphorus') from Greek, and
  - ashlagan ('potassium') from English (ashlag = 'potash')
- many computing terms are calqued from English: luach em ('motherboard'), me'abed ('processor'), natav ('router'), akhbar ('mouse'), cartis reshet ('network card'), sapak koach ('power supply'), mat'en ('charger').

According to linguist Ghil'ad Zuckermann, the more contributing languages have a structurally identical expression, the more likely it is to be calqued into the target language. In Israeli (his term for "Modern Hebrew") one uses má nishmà, lit. 'what's heard?', with the meaning of 'what's up?'. Zuckermann argues that this is a calque not only of the Yiddish expression ?וואָס הערט זיך(vos hert zikh?), but also of the parallel expressions in Polish, Russian and Romanian. Whereas most revivalists were native Yiddish speakers, many first speakers of Modern Hebrew spoke Russian and Polish, too. So a Polish speaker in the 1930s might have used má nishmà not (only) due to Yiddish vos hert zikh? but rather (also) due to Polish Co słychać? A Russian Jew might have used ma nishma due to Что слышно? (pronounced chto slyshno) and a Romanian Israeli would echo ce se aude. According to Zuckermann, such multi-sourced calquing is a manifestation of the Congruence principle.

== Malayalam ==
Modern Malayalam is replete with calques from English. The calques manifest themselves as idioms and expressions and many have gone on to become clichés. However standalone words are very few. The following is a list of commonly used calque phrases/expressions. All of these are exact translations of the corresponding English phrases.

1. Simha bhagam (സിംഹ ഭാഗം) 'lion's share'
2. Varikalkidayil vaayikuka (വരികള്‍ക്കിടയില്‍ വായിക്കുക) 'reading between the lines'
3. Chuvarazhuthu (ചുവരെഴുത്തു) 'the writing on the wall'
4. Moola kallu (മൂലക്കല്ല്) 'cornerstone'
5. Naazhikakallu (നാഴികക്കല്ല്) 'milestone'
6. Ooshmala varavelppu (ഊഷ്മ്ല വരവേല്‍പ്പ്) 'warm welcome'
7. Thanuppan prathikaranam (തണുപ്പന്‍ പ്രതികരണം) 'cold response'
8. Sheetayuddham (ശീതയുദ്ധം) 'Cold War'
9. Hridayabhedakam (ഹൃദയഭേദകം) 'heart-rending/breaking'
10. Chekuttaanum kadalinumidayil (ചെകുത്താനും കടലിനുമിടയില്‍) 'between the devil and the sea'
11. vazhivittu sahaayikkuka (വഴിവിട്ടു സഹായിക്കുക) 'go out of one's way'
12. kuthira kachavadam (കുതിര കച്ചവടം) 'horse trading'
13. mrigeeya bhooripaksham (മൃഗീയ ഭൂരിപക്ഷം) 'monstrous majority'
14. kavya neethi (കാവ്യനീതി) 'poetic justice'
15. ambara chumbikal (അംബരചുംബികൾ) 'buildings'; lit. 'sky-kissers'

== Mandarin Chinese ==
- huīyī zhǔjiào (灰衣主教) calques French éminence grise
- lánqiú (籃球 / 篮球) calques English basketball
- règǒu (熱狗 / 热狗) calques English hot dog
- ruǎnjiàn (軟件 / 软件) calques English software
- shǎndiànzhàn (閃電戰 / 闪电战) calques German Blitzkrieg
- tiěmù (鐵幕 / 铁幕) calques English Iron Curtain
