= Embellishment (disambiguation) =

Embellishment is a design element that adds interest to an object.

Embellishment may also refer to:

- Ornament (music)
- Diving (ice hockey), also known as embellishment

Embellish may also refer to:

- Embellish (EP), an EP by The Jellyrox
