= Emil Draitser =

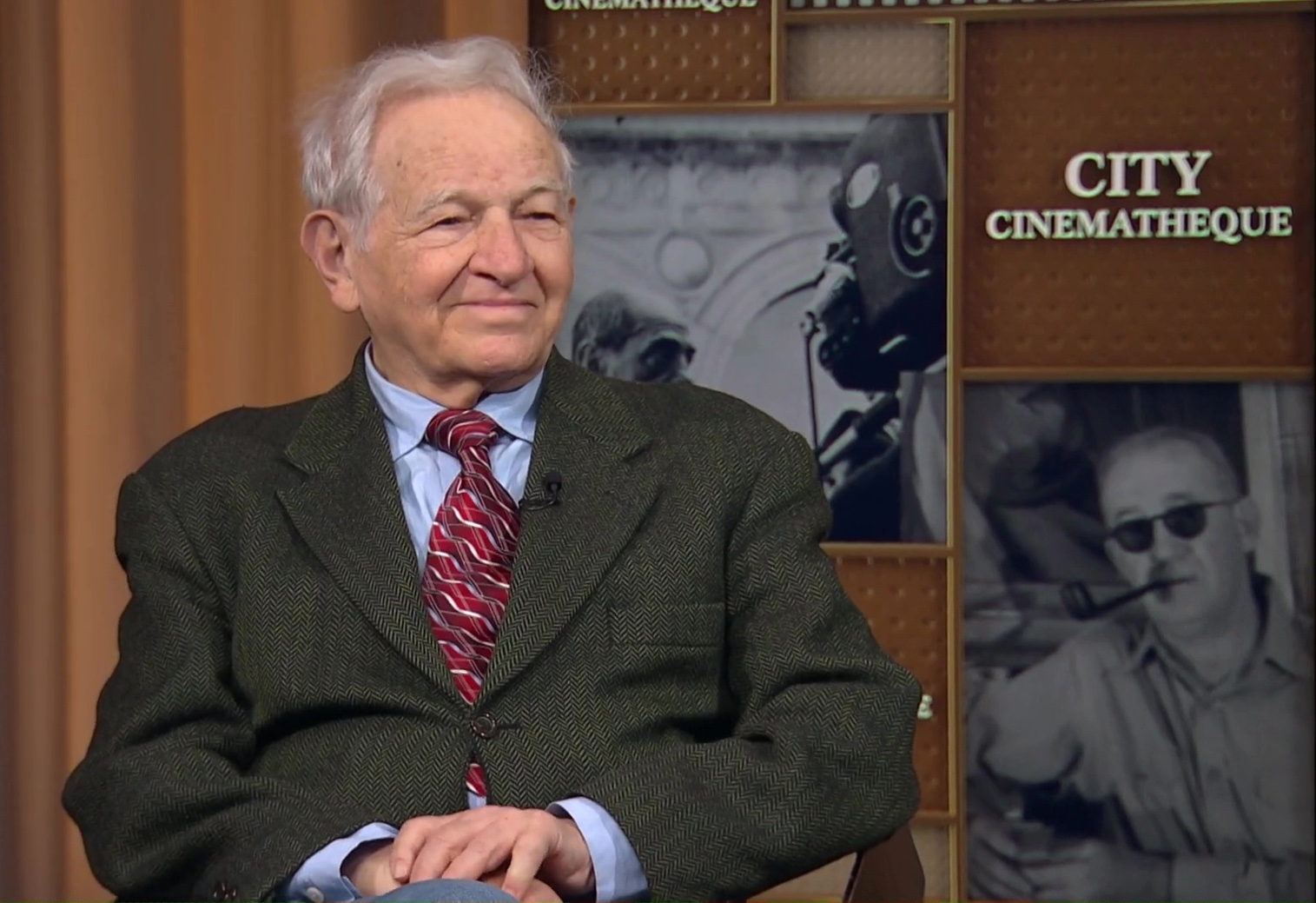
Draitser on CUNY TV's City Cinematheque, 2026

Emil Draitser (born 1937) is an author and professor of Russian at Hunter College in New York City. Besides seventeen books of artistic and scholarly prose, his essays and short stories have been published in the Los Angeles Times, Partisan Review, Kenyon Review, San Francisco Chronicle, World Literature Today, and many other American and Canadian periodicals. His fiction has also appeared in Russian, Polish, and Israeli journals. A three-time recipient of the New Jersey State Council on the Arts fellowships in writing and the prestigious Mark Aldanov International Literary Award, he has also received numerous grants for writing both fiction and non-fiction from the City University of New York. Draitser has given numerous public lectures and book talks at universities and cultural centers in the United States, Canada, the UK, Israel, Australia, New Zealand, and Russia.

== Early life ==
Draitser grew up in a Jewish family in the Soviet Union in the post-World War II years, in the anti-Semitic atmosphere of late Stalinism, at a time when Jews were forced to be silent about their religion and often tried to change their Jewish names. It was an oppressive childhood filled with suspicion and mistrust. As a young student, Draitser excelled at literature and decided that he wanted to be a journalist, despite his mother's preference that he study engineering. At that time, Jews attempting to enter the humanities encountered resistance, as the Soviet system saw those areas as politically vulnerable and felt that Jews entering them would try to subvert the system. Despite this, Draitser earned degrees first in engineering, and later in journalism.

== Career ==
Draitser has published both fiction and nonfiction since 1965. His work has appeared in leading Russian journals (including Youth, Literary Gazette, and Crocodile) under his pen name 'Emil Abramov'. He began his writing career as a freelancer contributing satirical articles to Soviet newspapers and magazines, though he had to be careful about what he wrote. For example, while he could criticize a particular factory for the poor workmanship of goods it produced, he could not criticize the economic system as a whole, although it became increasingly clear to him that the lack of competition that would inspire innovation combined with the Soviet mandate to guarantee work for all employees, regardless of their work ethic, made it impossible to produce quality products. Eventually, Draitser wrote an article critical of an important official which led to him being blacklisted, and prompted him to leave for the United States.

In 1975, he settled in Los Angeles, where he earned a Ph.D. in Russian literature from the University of California, Los Angeles. In 1986, he accepted a position at Hunter College in New York City, where he continued to teach. His first book published in the United States, Forbidden Laughter (1980) brought him national attention. Feature articles on him and his book appeared in The New York Times, Washington Post, and the Los Angeles Times. He has appeared on NBC News with Tom Brokaw, the Merv Griffin Show, and National Public Radio.

Draitser's research and writing have been supported by grants from the American Council of Learned Societies, the Memorial Foundation for Jewish Culture, the Social Science Foundation, and numerous grants from the City University of New York. He has been awarded residencies at the Vermont Arts Studios, Byrdcliffe Woodstock Art Colony, Renaissance House, and Banff Center for the Arts (Canada). Since spring 2009, he has been working on a sequel to his memoir Shush!, which covers his adulthood and move to the United States.

== Books ==
Forbidden Laughter: Soviet Underground Jokes (ed. & compl.)
(Los Angeles: Almanac Press, 1978, 1980) ISBN 1-49-44725-54
A compilation of Soviet-era political humor in Russian with English translation.

Peshchera neozhidannostei (The Fun House)

(New York: Possev-USA, 1984) ISBN 0-911971-03-3

A short story collection in Russian. Introduction by Vassily Aksyonov.

Techniques of Satire: The Case of Saltykov-Shchedrin.
(New York-Berlin: Mouton de Gruyter, 1994) ISBN 3-11-012624-9.
A study of comic devices used by satirists in general and the great 19th-century satirist in particular.

Poterialsia mal'chik (A Boy Was Lost)

(Moscow: Moskovskii rabochii, 1993)

A short story collection in Russian. Introduction by Lev Anninsky.

Taking Penguins to the Movies: Ethnic Humor in Russia
(Detroit: Wayne State University Press, 1999) ISBN 0-8143-2327-8
A sociological study that sheds light on Russian popular culture and ethnic humor in other countries.

Russkie poety XIX veka (Russian Poets of the Nineteenth Century) (ed. & compl.)
(Tenafly, NJ: Hermitage Publishers, 1999) ISBN 1-4929-5344-X

Russkie poety XX veka (Russian Poets of the Twentieth Century) (ed. & compl.)
(Tenafly, NJ: Hermitage Publishers, 2000) ISBN 1-4936-2351-6

Making War, Not Love: Gender and Sexuality in Russian Humor.

(New York: St. Martin's Press, 2000) ISBN 1-499-20758-1
A sociological study that sheds light on Russian popular culture and the nature of sexual humor everywhere.

The Supervisor of the Sea and Other Stories
(Riverside, CA: Xenos Books, 2003) ISBN 1-879378-47-7
e-book edition, 2011; ASIN B004VWX6NG
A short story collection in English

Kto ty takoi: Odessa Memoir 1945-53

(in Russian) (Baltimore: Seagull Press, 2003) ISBN 0-9714963-4-X

Wesele w Brighton Beach i inne opowidania
(in Polish) (Warsaw: Biblioteka Midrasza, 2008) ISBN 978-83-926515-0-5

Shush! Growing up Jewish under Stalin: A Memoir
(Berkeley, CA: University of California Press, 2008) ISBN 978-0-520-25446-6

Stalin's Romeo Spy: The Remarkable Rise and Fall of the KGB's Most Daring Operative

(Evanston, IL: Northwestern University Press, 2010) ISBN 978-0-8101-2664-0

Agent Dmitri: The Secret History of Russia's Most Daring Spy

(London, UK: Duckworth Publishers, 2012) ISBN 978-0715643778

Na kudykinu goru (From Here to Wherever)

(Baltimore, MD: Seagull Press, 2012) ISBN 9780982911365

A novel on Jewish emigration from Russia.

Szpieg Stalina (Stalin's Spy)

(Warsaw, Poland: AMF Plus Group, 2014) ISBN 978-8360532324

A Polish edition of Stalin's Romeo Spy

Farewell, Mama Odessa: A Novel

(Evanston, IL: Northwestern University Press, 2020) ISBN 978-0810141087

In the Jaws of the Crocodile: A Soviet Memoir

(Madison, WI: University of Wisconsin Press, 2021) ISBN 978-0299329006

Laughing All the Way to Freedom: Americanization of a Russian Emigre

(Jefferson, NC: McFarland, 2024) ISBN 978-1476692982

== Selected essays and short fiction ==
- "Oh My God, My Name's Not on Any of Those Lists," Los Angeles Times, 1976.
- "He Recalls the Soviet System and Goes Buggy," Los Angeles Times, 1977.
- "Let's See... a Socko Ending to This Disease Might Be...", Los Angeles Times, 1980.
- "Would You Buy a Used Soul From This Man,” Los Angeles Herald Examiner, 1983.
- "He Won't Make It," Studies in Contemporary Satire, Summer 1987.
- "The Supervisor of the Sea," Midstream, October 1988.
- "My First Ticket," The New Press Literary Quarterly, Summer/Fall 1995.
- "Clown," Confrontation, Fall 1997 (Awarded New Jersey State Council on the Arts Fellowship).
- "American Gospozha,” American Writing, 1998
- ”Dvorkin”, International Quarterly, Fall 1999.
- "Zugzwang" The Kenyon Review, Summer/Fall 1999.
- “Wedding in Brighton Beach” in Intersections: Fiction and Poetry from The Banff Centre for the Arts, 2000.
- “The Dark Copy,” Prism International (Canada) (Fall 2000).
- “Clouds,” The Literary Review, Spring 2001.
- “Faithful Masha” Partisan Review, Summer 2001 (Awarded New Jersey State Council on the Arts Fellowship) ()
- “Directions” The New Renaissance, Fall 2001.
- “No Kin, No Kith,” Partisan Review, January 2003.
- “The Death of Stalin,” Michigan Review Quarterly, Spring 2003 (selected as "Notable" in the Best American Essays of the year)
- “On the Commissars, Cosmopolites, and the Inventors of Electric Bulbs,” The North American Review, Nov-Dec 2004.
- "How to Get Exiled without Even Trying,"Jewish Literary Journal], January 2017
