= Congruence principle =

The term congruence principle may refer to any undertaking that seeks to align apparently disparate things. Specifically, it may refer to:

- In economics, the principle of fiscal equivalence, i.e., the false model in which the circle of buyers can be made to equate exactly with the circle of sellers.
- In education, the notion that principles such as Bloom's Taxonomy assist in maintaining congruence among various educational undertakings.
- In linguistics and etymology, the more contributing languages a linguistic feature exists in, the more likely it is to persist in the emerging language. See phono-semantic matching.
- In mathematics, the application of principles associated with Cavalieri's principle.
- In medicine, the corollary principle of metabolism that holds that "present-day metabolism holds traces of the primitive chemistry and could serve as a valuable source of inspiration in the elaboration of theories."
- In psychology, a corollary to the principle of cognitive dissonance, the notion that it is impossible for a person (or organisation) to live too long where there is incongruity between a belief and a behavior. It's based on the principle of poetic justice.
- In taxonomy, two biological classifications have taxonomic congruence if it can be hypothesized that the two derive from the same theoretical phylogenetic tree.

== See also ==
- Equivalence principle
