= Litotes =

Ironic figure of speech

In rhetoric, litotes (/laɪˈtoʊtiːz, ˈlaɪtətiːz/, US: /ˈlɪtətiːz/) is a figure of speech and form of irony to emphasize a point by stating a negative to affirm a positive. In speech, litotes may depend on intonation and emphasis; for example, the phrase "not bad" can be intonated differently so as to mean either "mediocre" or "excellent". The interpretation of negation may also depend on context, including cultural context. Litotes can be used euphemistically to diminish the harshness of an observation: "He isn't the cleanest person I know" could be used to indicate that someone is a messy person.

A form of understatement, litotes is always deliberate with the intention of emphasis, often using double negatives for effect. Litotes is also known classically as antenantiosis or moderatour.

The use of litotes is common in many languages and dialects. It is a feature of Old English poetry and of the Icelandic sagas and is a means of much stoical restraint.

== Origin and etymology ==
The first known mention of litotes is in a letter from Cicero in 56 BC (De Oratore). Cicero uses the word to mean simplicity (or frugality) of life. The meaning and the function of the word changed from 'simple' to the idea of understatement that involves double negatives, a way to state things simply.

The word litotes comes from Greek litotes (λιτότης), meaning 'simplicity,' which is further derived from the word litos (λιτός), meaning 'plain, meager, or simple in style.'

"Litotes" is sometimes spelled as "lyptote" or "liptote;" the device may also be referred to as antenantiosis, diminutio or deminutio, extenuatio, or the moderatour.

== Rhetoric use ==
Litotes, though an understatement, often have the paradoxical effect of exaggerating the statement as the audience, imagining what is missing, tends to hyperbolize.

Similar to antiphrasis, context and intonation are imperative to understanding and communication litotes. For example, in Le Cid, Chimène, to her suitor, Rodrigue, says "Je ne te hais point" (French for "I don't hate you") to communicate her love for him. While one could interpret this literally, the context (Rodrigue having killed Chimène's father in a duel) implies her ardor for Rodrigue.

Litotes can be used to establish ethos, or credibility, by expressing modesty or downplaying one's accomplishments to gain the audience's favor. The Rhetorica ad Herennium, (which groups litotes as deminutio along with meiosis and other forms of understatement) provides the following example: "this, men of the jury, I have the right to say – that, by labor and diligence I have contrived to be no laggard in the mastery of military science." In this case, the referral of the expert as of "no laggard" removes arrogance from the orator's speech. The book's author argues that when such matters (studiousness, wealth, etc.) are said indiscreetly, it may provoke jealousy in everyday contexts and antipathy in speeches.

=== Counter-litotes ===
Counter-litotes refer to hyperbole in order to deflate an idea (in the same sense litotes are understatement in order to hyperbolize an idea). For example, a sign that reads "No smoking, remember the fire at the Charity Bazaar" may be satirized using a counter litote by writing "No spitting, remember the flooding of the Seine;" the satire (using parallelism) compares to the first phrase, but the counter-litotes in the latter makes the former feel underwhelming or as hyperbole in itself.

== Examples ==
In speech, especially colloquially, litotes are commonly used; below are some examples:

- "Not bad" ("good")
- "It's not my favorite" ("I don't like it")
- "Not too shabby" ("nice")
- Non-trivial ("very complex")
- "It's not the cheapest" ("very expensive")
- "Not unlike" ("like")
- "I wouldn't say no" ("yes")
- "It's no masterpiece" ("it's mediocre")
- "She's no oil painting" ("she's ugly")
- "No laughing matter" ("very serious")

The following are historical, literary, and cultural examples:

- "Paul answered, 'I am a Jew, from Tarsus in Cilicia, a citizen of no ordinary city. Please let me speak to the people'" Acts 21:39
- "The edge [sword] was not useless / To the hero-in-battle" Beowulf, fitt 24
- "Not a drum was heard, not a funeral note, / As his corpse to the rampart we hurried" – Charles Wolfe, "The Burial of Sir John Moore at Corunna"
- "We are not amused" – Queen Victoria after being told a story involving impropriety, according to Caroline Holland in Notebooks of a Spinster Lady
- "The war situation has developed not necessarily to Japan's advantage" – Hirohito announcing Japan's surrender, 1945
- "Not happy, Jan!" – Australian advertisement
- "and thereafter persons of wealth and culture formed a not unimportant element in the Christian community" – Chester G. Starr, A History of the Ancient World
- "It isn't very serious. I have this tiny little tumor on the brain" – J. D. Salinger, The Catcher in the Rye

== Other languages ==
=== Arabic ===
In Arabic, the phrase لا يحسد عليه ("not to be envied for") is used to refer to a very bad situation.

=== Classical Greek ===
In Classical Greek, instances of litotes can be found as far back as Homer. In Book 24 of the Iliad, Zeus describes Achilles as follows: οὔτε γάρ ἔστ᾽ ἄφρων οὔτ᾽ ἄσκοπος, 'for not without wisdom is he, neither without purpose', (Note: Perseus Project Il.24.159) meaning that he is both wise and prudent.

=== French ===
In French, pas mal (not bad) is used similarly to the English, while il n'est pas antipathique ('he is not disagreeable') is another example, actually meaning il est très sympathique ('he is nice'), though the speaker is reluctant to admit it. Another typical example is Ce n'est pas bête! ('It's not stupid'), generally said to admit a clever suggestion without showing oneself as too enthusiastic. (As with all litotes, this phrase can also be used with its literal meaning that the thing is not stupid but rather may be clever or occupy the middle ground between stupid and clever.)

One of the most famous litotes of French literature is in Pierre Corneille's Le Cid (1636). The heroine, Chimène, says to her lover Rodrigue, who just killed her father: Va, je ne te hais point ('Go, I hate you not'), meaning 'I love you'.

=== Chinese ===
In Chinese, the phrase 不错 (Pinyin: bù cuò, traditional characters 不錯, literally 'not wrong') is often used to present something as very good or correct. In this way, it is distinct in meaning from the English 'not bad' (though not 'not bad at all') or the general use of the French pas mal. Also, the phrase 不简单 (pinyin bù jiǎn dān, traditional characters 不簡單, literally 'not simple') is used to refer to an impressive feat.

=== Danish ===
In Danish, understatements using litotes are seen as characteristic of the Jutlandic dialect. A stereotypical example is the phrase det er ikke så ringe endda ('it is not even so bad'), which is used to mean 'that's great'.

=== Dutch and German ===
Similarly, in Dutch, the phrase niet slecht (also literally meaning 'not bad') is often used to present something as very good or correct, as is German nicht schlecht.

=== Italian ===
In Italian, meno male (literally 'less bad') is similar to the English expression 'just as well' – used to comment that a situation is more desirable than its negative – and implying a sense of relief that the result was no worse; mica male (literally 'not (at all) bad') has about the same meaning as the English 'not bad'.

=== Latin ===
In Latin, an example of litotes can be found in Ovid's Metamorphoses: non semel (bk. 1 ln. 692, 'not one occasion'), meaning 'on more than one occasion'. Some common words are derived from litotes: nonnulli from non nulli ('not none') is understood to mean 'several', while nonnumquam from non numquam ('not never') is used for 'sometimes'.

=== Old Norse ===
Old Norse had several types of litotes. These points are denied negatives ("She's not a terrible wife" meaning "she's a good wife"), denied positives ("He's not a great learner" meaning 'he has difficulty learning'), creating litotes without negating anything, and creating litotes using a negative adjective ("Days spent in his home left him unenthused" meaning 'he preferred to be out and about').

=== Russian ===
Perhaps the most common litotes in Russian is неплохо ('not bad'). It is permissible to say something is очень неплохо ('very not bad') to signify that it is, in fact, very good. An example of litotes can be found in Nikolai Gogol's The Government Inspector, in which the Mayor says: "There's no such thing as a man with no sins on his conscience", meaning 'All men have sins on their conscience' (Act 1, Scene 1). In this case, it is used to downplay the Mayor's statement – a euphemism of sorts – making it less harsh than its understood meaning.

=== Spanish ===
In Spanish, it is usual to say No es nada tonto ('It's not at all foolish'), as a form of compliment (i.e., to say something was smart or clever). Another common Spanish phrase is menos mal (cf. Italian meno male above), meaning literally 'less bad', but used in the same way as the English phrases "Thank goodness!" or "It's just as well".

=== Swedish ===
In Swedish, it is quite common to use litotes. For example, when one chances to meet someone after a long time it is usual to say: Det var inte igår ('It wasn't yesterday').

=== Turkish ===
In Turkish, it is quite common to say Hiç fena değil! ('Not bad at all!') as a form of compliment.

=== Welsh ===
In Welsh, Siomi ar yr ochr orau ('To be disappointed on the best side') means 'to be pleasantly surprised'.

== See also ==
- Antiphrasis
- Hyperbole
