= Euphemism =

Mild or indirect word or expression

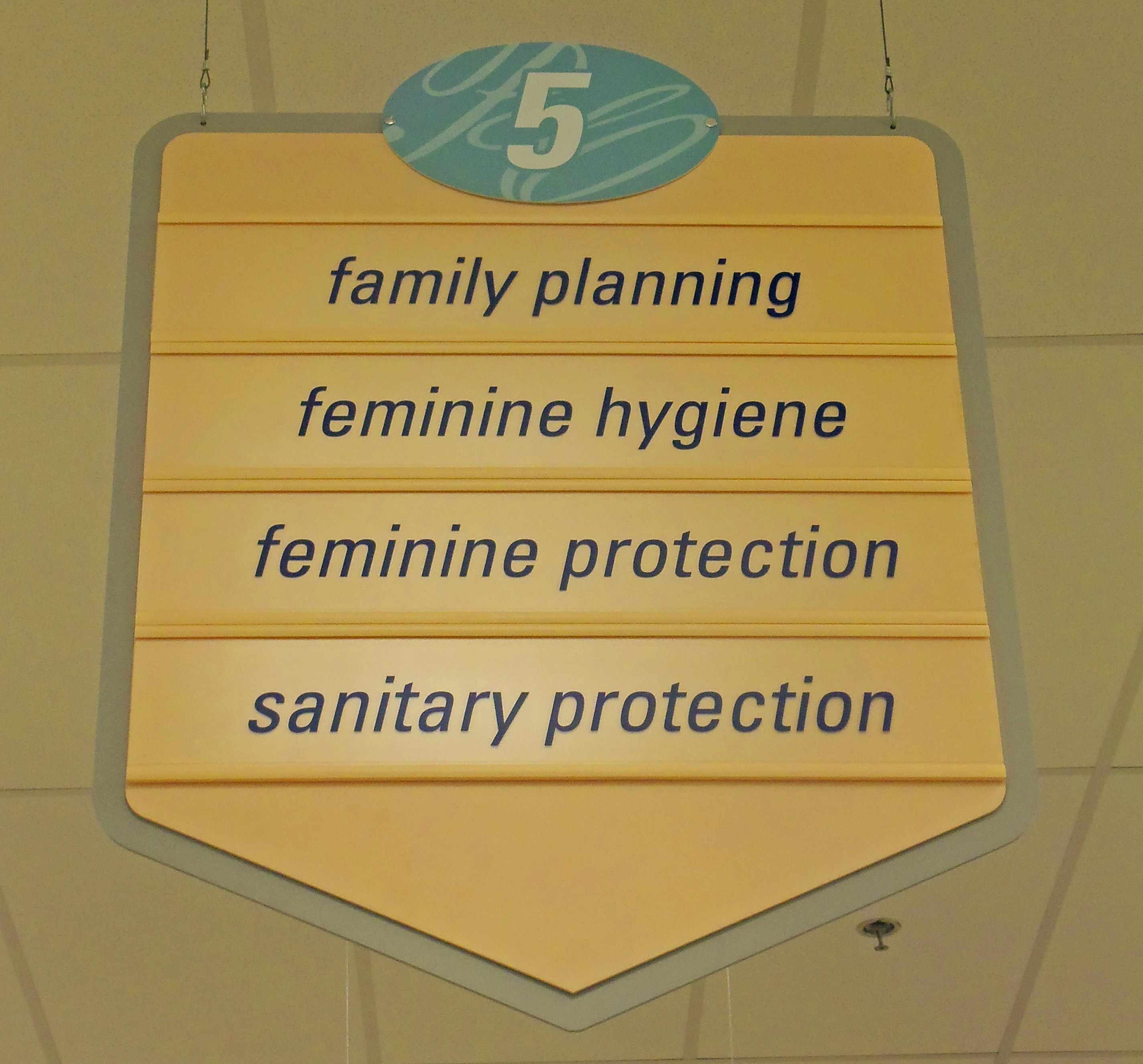
Sign in a Rite Aid drugstore using common euphemisms for (from top): contraceptives; menstrual pads and tampons; adult diapers

A euphemism is the substitution of a potentially offensive or unpleasant word or expression with one that is more pleasant or inoffensive. Some euphemisms are humorous, while others use mild or neutral language to downplay certain concepts. They can often be used to soften profanity or discuss sensitive or taboo topics, such as disability, sex, bodily functions, pain, violence, illness, or death, in a more polite manner.

== Etymology ==
Euphemism comes from the Greek word euphemia (εὐφημία), 'words of good omen'; it is a compound of eû (εὖ), meaning 'good, well', and phḗmē (φήμη), meaning 'prophetic speech; rumour, talk'.

Eupheme is a reference to the female Greek spirit of words of praise and positivity. The term euphemism itself was used as a euphemism by the ancient Greeks, with the meaning "to keep a holy silence" (speaking well by not speaking at all).

== Purpose ==
Euphemisms are often used to avoid discussing sensitive topics such as death, sex, and bodily functions.

As an example, the term "late", commonly used to signify that someone has passed, is identified as a euphemism for 'dead' in the Oxford University Press's Dictionary of Euphemisms.

Euphemisms are often used to soften or downplay the severity of injustices or other events that officials may want to avoid directly addressing. For example, when a hiring manager needs to fire an employee they may say "we need to let you go" vs "we are firing you." Similarly, during the 2022 Russian invasion of Ukraine, Russian President Vladimir Putin referred to the invasion as a "special military operation" in his speech announcing the start of the war.

Euphemisms are sometimes employed to soften resistance to political actions. For instance, linguist Ghil'ad Zuckermann noted that Israeli Prime Minister Benjamin Netanyahu used the neutral Hebrew lexical item פעימות peimót (meaning 'beatings (of the heart)') instead of נסיגה nesigá ('withdrawal') to describe the phases of Israel's withdrawal from the West Bank. This substitution aimed to reduce opposition from right-wing Israelis to the withdrawal process, with Peimót serving as a euphemism for 'withdrawal'.

== Formation methods ==
=== Modification ===
==== Minced oaths (phonetically) ====
Phonetic euphemism involves replacing offensive or blasphemous words with milder alternatives to reduce their impact. This practice, known as taboo deformation or minced oath includes altering the pronunciation or spelling of taboo words, such as profanity. Examples of this include:

- Shortening or "clipping" the term, such as Jeez ('Jesus') and what the— ('what the hell').
- Mispronunciations, such as oh my gosh ('oh my God'), frickin ('fucking'), darn ('damn') or oh shoot ('oh shit'). This is also referred to as a minced oath. Feck is a minced oath for 'fuck', originating in Hiberno-English and popularised outside of Ireland by the British sitcom Father Ted.
- Using acronyms, such as SOB ('son of a bitch'). Sometimes, the word word or bomb is added after it, such as F-word ('fuck'), etc. The letter can also be phonetically respelled.

==== Substitutions (semantically) ====
Pleasant, positive, or neutral terms are commonly used in various contexts, such as sociopolitical movements, marketing, public relations, and advertising campaigns. These terms are often deliberately chosen to convey a specific message or create a certain impression.

- meatpacking company for 'slaughterhouse' (avoids entirely the subject of killing)
- natural issue or love child for 'bastard'
- let go for 'fired/sacked'

Cockney rhyming slang can be used to soften offensive language. For instance, calling someone a berk is less harsh than using the more explicit cunt. Berk is derived from Berkeley Hunt, which rhymes with cunt.

=== Foreign words ===
Foreign language expressions or words may be imported for use or derived for a new word as a euphemism. For example, the French word enceinte sometimes became "encient" or was used instead of the English word pregnant; abattoir into "abbatoire" became slaughterhouse, although in French the word retains its explicit violent meaning, 'a place for beating down', conveniently lost on non-French speakers; douche (French for 'shower') for vaginal irrigation device; and bidet ('little pony') for vessel for anal washing. Although in English physical "handicaps" are often described with euphemisms, in French the English word handicap is used as a euphemism for the problematic words infirmité or invalidité.

=== Periphrasis & circumlocution ===
Periphrasis or circumlocution is a common linguistic phenomenon where speakers "speak around" a given word or concept without directly stating it. This practice often creates widely accepted euphemisms that substitute certain words or ideas.

=== Slang ===
The use of a term with a softer connotation, although it shares the same meaning. For instance, screwed up is a euphemism for 'fucked up'; hook-up and laid are euphemisms for 'sexual intercourse'.

=== Understatement ===
Euphemisms formed from understatements include asleep for dead and drinking for consuming alcohol. "Tired and emotional" is a notorious British euphemism for "drunk", one of many recurring jokes popularized by the satirical magazine Private Eye; it has been used by MPs to avoid unparliamentary language.

=== Metaphor ===
- Metaphors (beat the meat, choke the chicken, or jerkin' the gherkin for 'masturbation'; take a dump and take a leak for 'defecation' and 'urination', respectively)
- Comparisons (buns for 'buttocks', weed for 'cannabis')
- Metonymy (The Pentagon for the US Department of Defense, Wall Street for the entire US financial sector)

== Doublespeak ==
Bureaucracies intentionally frequently spawn euphemisms as doublespeak expressions. For example, in the past, the U.S. military used the term "sunshine units" for contamination by radioactive isotopes. The United States Central Intelligence Agency refers to systematic torture as "enhanced interrogation techniques". An effective death sentence in the Soviet Union during the Great Purge often used the clause "imprisonment without right to correspondence;" the person sentenced would be shot soon after conviction.

As early as 1939, Nazi official Reinhard Heydrich used the term Sonderbehandlung ("special treatment") to mean summary execution of persons viewed as having "disciplinary problems". Heinrich Himmler, aware that the word had come to mean murder, replaced that euphemism with one in which Jews would be "guided" (to their deaths) through the slave-labor and extermination camps after having been "evacuated" (to their deaths).

== Lifespan ==
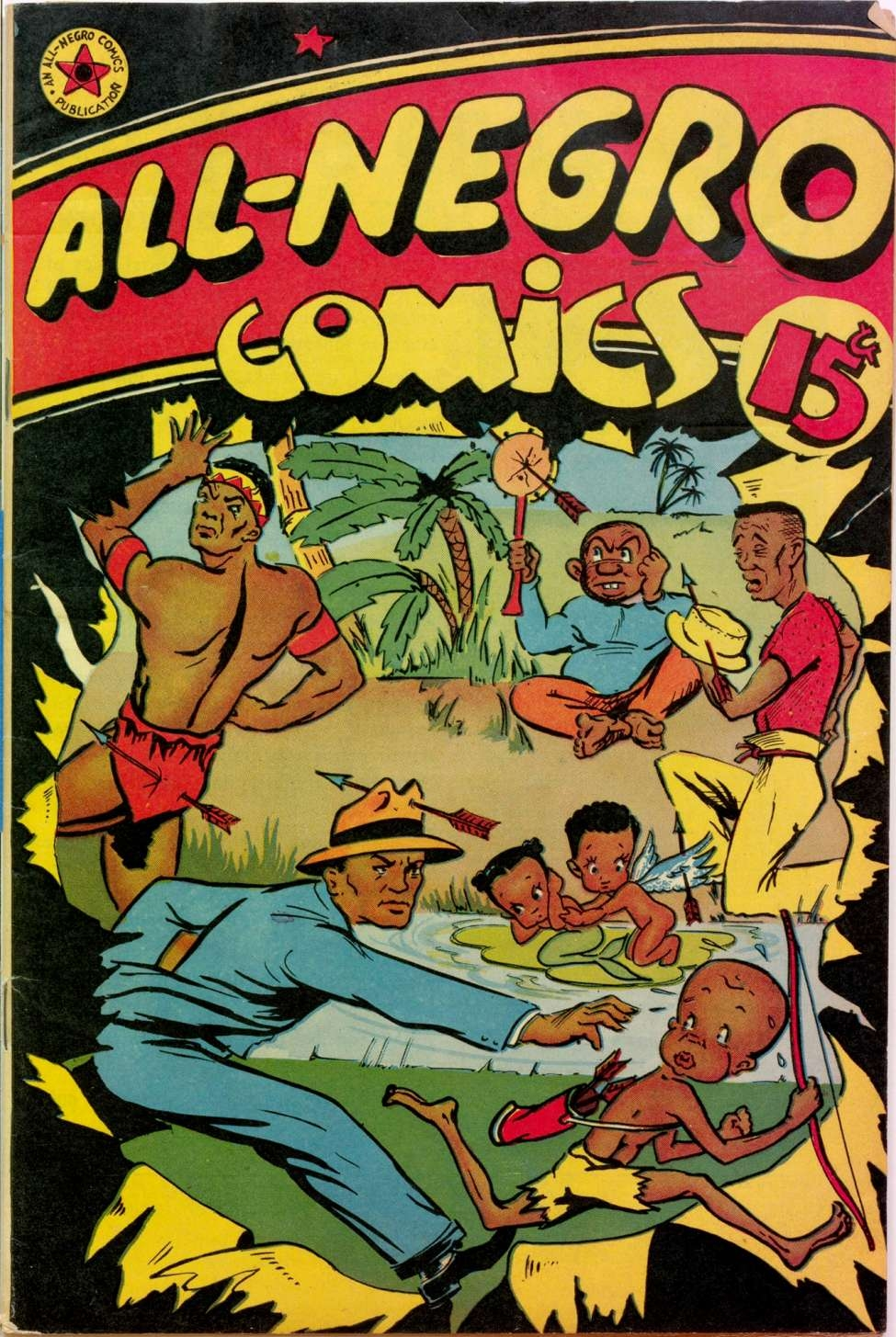
Negro is an example of a euphemism that has become outdated and taboo.

Over time, euphemisms can become taboo words through the linguistic process of semantic change known as pejoration. In 1974, University of Oregon linguist Sharon Henderson Taylor dubbed the euphemism cycle, also frequently referred to as the euphemism treadmill, as worded by Steven Pinker. For instance, the place of human defecation is a needy candidate for a euphemism in all eras. Toilet is an 18th-century euphemism, replacing the older euphemism house-of-office, which in turn replaced the even older euphemisms privy-house and bog-house. In the 20th century, where the old euphemisms lavatory (a place where one washes) and toilet (a place where one dresses) had grown from widespread usage (e.g., in the United States) to being synonymous with the crude act they sought to deflect, they were sometimes replaced with bathroom (a place where one bathes), washroom (a place where one washes), restroom (a place where one rests), or powder room (a place where one applies facial cosmetics). The form water closet, often shortened to W.C., is a less deflective form. The word shit appears to have originally been a euphemism for defecation in Pre-Germanic, as the Proto-Indo-European root *sḱeyd-, from which it was derived, meant 'to cut off'.

Another example in American English is the replacement of "colored people" with "Negro" (a euphemism from a foreign language), which itself came to be replaced by either "African American" or "Black". Also in the United States, the term "ethnic minorities" in the 2010s increasingly was replaced by "people of color".

"Venereal disease", which euphemistically associated a contagious infection with Venus, the goddess of love, lost its deflective force as the word venereal became more closely associated with the infection than the goddess and was abbreviated "VD". Later, this was replaced by the more clinical abbreviation "STD" (sexually transmitted disease), which has since been replaced by "STI" (sexually transmitted infection) in an effort to de-stigmatize testing for asymptomatic patients before they show disease symptoms.

People with intellectual disabilities were originally defined with words such as "morons" or "imbeciles", which then became commonly used insults. The medical diagnosis was changed to "mentally retarded", which morphed into the pejorative "retard" against those with intellectual disabilities. To avoid the negative connotations of their diagnoses, students who need accommodations because of such conditions are often labeled as "special needs" instead, although the words "special" or "SPED" (short for "special education") have long been schoolyard insults. As of August 2013, the Social Security Administration replaced the term "mental retardation" with "intellectual disability". Since 2012, that change in terminology has been adopted by the National Institutes of Health and the medical industry at large. Numerous disability-related euphemisms have negative connotations.

== See also ==
- Algospeak
- Call a spade a spade
- Code word (figure of speech)
- Dead Parrot sketch
- Distinction without a difference
- Dog whistle (politics)
- Double entendre
- Dysphemism
- Emotive conjugation
- Expurgation (often called bowdlerization, after Thomas Bowdler)
- Inclusive language
- Framing (social sciences)
- Minimisation (psychology)
- Paradiastole
- Persuasive definition
- Polite fiction
- Political correctness
- Political euphemism
- Puns
- Sexual slang
- Spin (propaganda)
- Word play
- Word taboo
