= Index of joke types =

This is an index of joke types.

== List ==
- Anti-humor
- Bar joke
- Bellman joke
- Black comedy
- Blonde joke
- British humour
- Callback
- Chuck Norris Facts
- Conditional joke
- Cringe comedy
- Cruel jokes
- Dad joke
- Dead baby jokes
- Desert island joke
- Dick joke
- Drummer jokes
- East German jokes
- Elephant joke
- Ethnic joke
- Flatulence humor
- Hindu joke
- Holocaust humor
- In-joke
- In Soviet Russia
- Jewish humor
- Joke chess problem
- Knock-knock joke
- Lawyer joke
- Lightbulb joke
- Little rabbit jokes
- Mathematical joke
- Military humor
- Milkman joke
- Monsieur et Madame jokes
- Mother-in-law joke
- Nam-ı Kemal jokes
- New Zealand humour
- Observational comedy
- Off-color humor
- One-line joke
- Pathan joke
- Physical comedy
- Polish joke
- Practical joke
  - List of practical joke topics
- Pun
- Radio Yerevan jokes
- Redneck joke
- Ribaldry
- Riddle joke
- Roman jokes
- Romanian humour
- Running gag
- Russian jokes
- Russian political jokes
- Satire
- Sardarji joke
- Self-referential humor
- Shaggy dog story
- Slapstick
- Snipe hunt
- Surreal humour
- Three wishes joke
- Throwaway line
- Toilet humour
- Viola jokes
- Whisper joke
- "Yo mama" joke
- Category:Joke cycles
- Category:Jokes
