= Conditional joke =

A conditional joke is a joke meant for a qualified audience only. Philosopher and author Ted Cohen states these types of jokes are hermetic and require a certain prior knowledge or belief from the audience of the topic, which in turn enables them to understand the joke. Such ability is also called the "prerequisite condition for laughter".

Conditional jokes often depend on the internalized negative stereotypes held by the audience toward a targeted group of people. Such affective disposition can also explain the persistence of ethnic jokes in multicultural societies. Although they can be understood by many, conditional jokes usually don't make the ridiculed individuals or targeted groups laugh at the punch line.

The most common type of conditional joke targets the jargon and all topics specific to certain professions and occupations. This type includes doctors (surgeons, internists, psychiatrists, etc.), lawyers, politicians, musicians, and religious leaders, such as rabbis, to name a few. Other hermetic jokes which target ethnicity include Polish jokes made in the US, Irish jokes made in England, Ukrainian jokes made in Russia, Newfie jokes made in Canada, Sardarji jokes made in India, Russian jokes about ethnicities, Texas jokes, Jewish jokes made by non-Jews, Black-people jokes made by non-Blacks, and numerous others.

== See also ==
- In-joke
- Ethnic stereotype
- An Englishman, an Irishman and a Scotsman
- Stereotype
