= Joke =

Display of humour using words

Boris Yeltsin and Bill Clinton enjoying a joke

A joke is a display of humour in which words are used within a specific and well-defined narrative structure to make people laugh and is usually not meant to be interpreted literally. It usually takes the form of a story, often with dialogue, and ends in a punch line, whereby the humorous element of the story is revealed; this can be done using a pun or other type of word play, irony or sarcasm, logical incompatibility, hyperbole, or other means. Linguist Robert Hetzron offers the definition:

A joke is a short humorous piece of oral literature in which the funniness culminates in the final sentence, called the punchline… In fact, the main condition is that the tension should reach its highest level at the very end. No continuation relieving the tension should be added. As for its being "oral," it is true that jokes may appear printed, but when further transferred, there is no obligation to reproduce the text verbatim, as in the case of poetry.

It is generally held that jokes benefit from brevity, containing no more detail than is needed to set the scene for the punchline at the end. In the case of riddle jokes or one-liners, the setting is implicitly understood, leaving only the dialogue and punchline to be verbalised. However, subverting these and other common guidelines can also be a source of humour—the shaggy dog story is an example of an anti-joke; although presented as a joke, it contains a long drawn-out narrative of time, place and character, rambles through many pointless inclusions and finally fails to deliver a punchline. Jokes are a form of humour, but not all humour is in the form of a joke. Some humorous forms which are not verbal jokes are: involuntary humour, situational humour, practical jokes, slapstick and anecdotes.

Identified as one of the simple forms of oral literature by the Dutch linguist André Jolles, jokes are passed along anonymously. They are told in both private and public settings; a single person tells a joke to his friend in the natural flow of conversation, or a set of jokes is told to a group as part of scripted entertainment. Jokes are also passed along in written form or, more recently, through the internet.

Stand-up comics, comedians and slapstick work with comic timing and rhythm in their performance, and may rely on actions as well as on the verbal punchline to evoke laughter. This distinction has been formulated in the popular saying "A comic says funny things; a comedian says things funny". (Note: Generally attributed to Ed Wynn)

== History in print ==
Jokes do not belong to refined culture, but rather to the entertainment and leisure of all classes. As such, any printed versions were considered ephemera, i.e., temporary documents created for a specific purpose and intended to be thrown away. Many of these early jokes deal with scatological and sexual topics, entertaining to all social classes but not to be valued and saved.

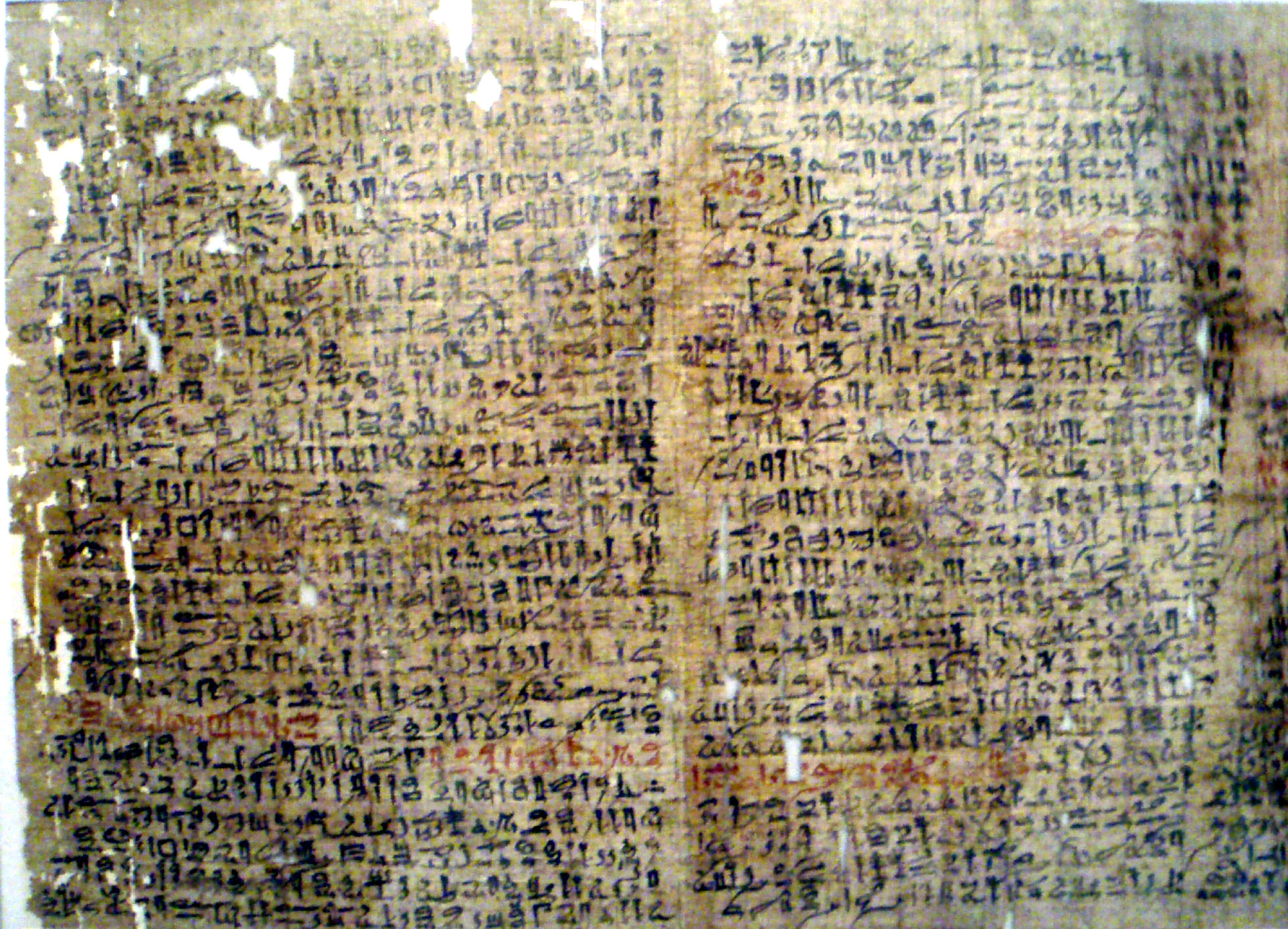
The Westcar Papyrus, dating to c. 1600 BC, contains an example of one of the earliest surviving jokes.

Various kinds of jokes have been identified in ancient pre-classical texts. (Note: In 2008, British TV channel Dave commissioned a team of academics, led by humour expert Paul McDonald from the University of Wolverhampton, to research the world's oldest examples of recorded humour. Because humour may be difficult to define their condition was "a clear set-up and punch line structure". In review, McDonald stated: "... jokes have varied over the years, with some taking the question and answer format while others are witty proverbs or riddles. What they all share, however, is a willingness to deal with taboos and a degree of rebellion. Modern puns, Essex girl jokes and toilet humour can all be traced back to the very earliest jokes identified in this research." Joseph 2008) The oldest identified joke is an ancient Sumerian proverb from 1900 BC containing toilet humour: "Something which has never occurred since time immemorial; a young woman did not fart in her husband's lap." Its records were dated to the Old Babylonian period and the joke may go as far back as 2300 BC. The second oldest joke found, discovered on the Westcar Papyrus and believed to be about Sneferu, was from Ancient Egypt c. 1600 BC: "How do you entertain a bored pharaoh? You sail a boatload of young women dressed only in fishing nets down the Nile and urge the pharaoh to go catch a fish." The tale of the three ox drivers from Adab completes the three known oldest jokes in the world. This is a comic triple dating back to 1200 BC Adab. It concerns three men seeking justice from a king on the matter of ownership over a newborn calf, for whose birth they all consider themselves to be partially responsible. The king seeks advice from a priestess on how to rule the case, and she suggests a series of events involving the men's households and wives. The final portion of the story (which included the punch line), has not survived intact, though legible fragments suggest it was bawdy in nature.

Jokes can be notoriously difficult to translate from language to language; particularly puns, which depend on specific words and not just on their meanings. For instance, Julius Caesar once sold land at a surprisingly cheap price to his lover Servilia, who was rumoured to be prostituting her daughter Tertia to Caesar in order to keep his favour. Cicero remarked that "conparavit Servilia hunc fundum tertia deducta." The punny phrase, "tertia deducta", can be translated as "with one-third off (in price)", or "with Tertia putting out."

The earliest extant joke book is the Philogelos (Greek for The Laughter-Lover), a collection of 265 jokes written in crude ancient Greek dating to the fourth or fifth century AD. The author of the collection is obscure and a number of different authors are attributed to it, including "Hierokles and Philagros the grammatikos", just "Hierokles", or, in the Suda, "Philistion". British classicist Mary Beard states that the Philogelos may have been intended as a jokester's handbook of quips to say on the fly, rather than a book meant to be read straight through. Many of the jokes in this collection are surprisingly familiar, even though the typical protagonists are less recognisable to contemporary readers: the absent-minded professor, the eunuch, and people with hernias or bad breath. The Philogelos even contains a joke similar to Monty Python's "Dead Parrot Sketch".

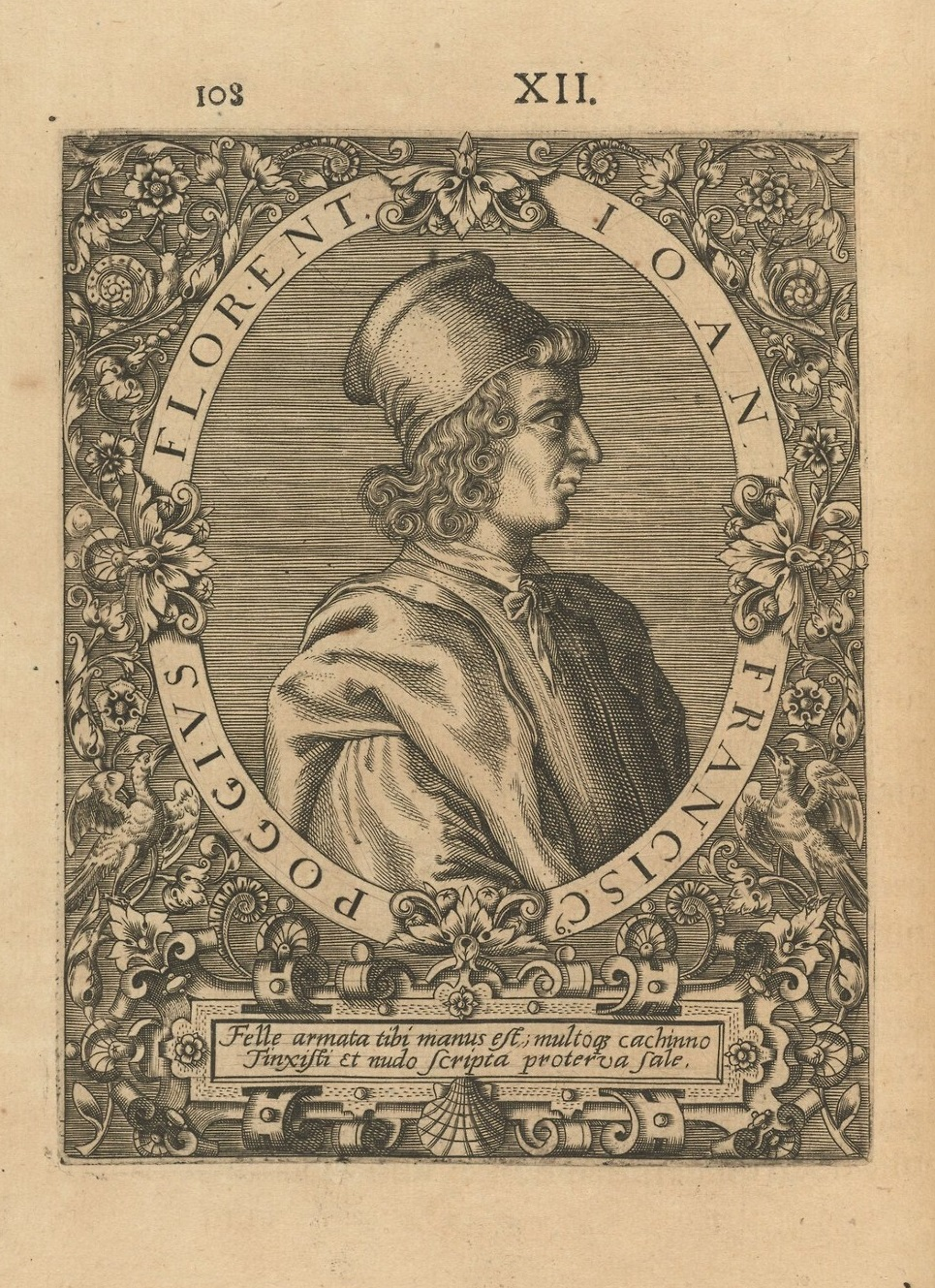
1597 engraving of Poggio Bracciolini, author of one of the first joke anthologies

During the 15th century, the printing revolution spread across Europe following the development of the movable type printing press. This was coupled with the growth of literacy in all social classes. Printers turned out Jestbooks along with Bibles to meet both lowbrow and highbrow interests of the populace. One early anthology of jokes was the Facetiae by the Italian Poggio Bracciolini, first published in 1470. The popularity of this jest book can be measured on the twenty editions of the book documented alone for the 15th century. Another popular form was a collection of jests, jokes and funny situations attributed to a single character in a more connected, narrative form of the picaresque novel. Examples of this are the characters of Rabelais in France, Till Eulenspiegel in Germany, Lazarillo de Tormes in Spain and Master Skelton in England. There is also a jest book ascribed to William Shakespeare, the contents of which appear to both inform and borrow from his plays. All of these early jestbooks corroborate both the rise in the literacy of the European populations and the general quest for leisure activities during the Renaissance in Europe.

The practice of printers using jokes and cartoons as page fillers was also widely used in the broadsides and chapbooks of the 19th century and earlier. With the increase in literacy in the general population and the growth of the printing industry, these publications were the most common forms of printed material between the 16th and 19th centuries throughout Europe and North America. Along with reports of events, executions, ballads and verse, they also contained jokes. Only one of many broadsides archived in the Harvard library is described as "1706. Grinning made easy; or, Funny Dick's unrivalled collection of curious, comical, odd, droll, humorous, witty, whimsical, laughable, and eccentric jests, jokes, bulls, epigrams, &c. With many other descriptions of wit and humour." These cheap publications, ephemera intended for mass distribution, were read alone, read aloud, posted and discarded.

There are many types of joke books in print today; a search on the internet provides a plethora of titles available for purchase. They can be read alone for solitary entertainment, or used to stock up on new jokes to entertain friends. Some people try to find a deeper meaning in jokes, as in "Plato and a Platypus Walk into a Bar... Understanding Philosophy Through Jokes". (Note: NPR Interview with the authors Cathcart and Klein can be found at https://www.npr.org/2007/05/13/10158510/joking-and-learning-about-philosophy) However a deeper meaning is not necessary to appreciate their inherent entertainment value. Magazines frequently use jokes and cartoons as filler for the printed page. Reader's Digest closes out many articles with an (unrelated) joke at the bottom of the article. The New Yorker was first published in 1925 with the stated goal of being a "sophisticated humour magazine" and is still known for its cartoons.

== Telling jokes ==
Telling a joke is a cooperative effort; it requires that the teller and the audience mutually agree in one form or another to understand the narrative which follows as a joke. In a study of conversation analysis, the sociologist Harvey Sacks describes in detail the sequential organisation in the telling of a single joke. "This telling is composed, as for stories, of three serially ordered and adjacently placed types of sequences … the preface [framing], the telling, and the response sequences." Folklorists expand this to include the context of the joking. Who is telling what jokes to whom? And why is he telling them when? The context of the joke-telling in turn leads into a study of joking relationships, a term coined by anthropologists to refer to social groups within a culture who engage in institutionalised banter and joking.

=== Framing: "Have you heard the one…" ===
Framing is done with a (frequently formulaic) expression which keys the audience in to expect a joke. "Have you heard the one…", "Reminds me of a joke I heard…", "So, a lawyer and a doctor…"; these conversational markers are just a few examples of linguistic frames used to start a joke. Regardless of the frame used, it creates a social space and clear boundaries around the narrative which follows. Audience response to this initial frame can be acknowledgement and anticipation of the joke to follow. It can also be a dismissal, as in "this is no joking matter" or "this is no time for jokes".

The performance frame serves to label joke-telling as a culturally marked form of communication. Both the performer and audience understand it to be set apart from the "real" world. "An elephant walks into a bar…"; a person sufficiently familiar with both the English language and the way jokes are told automatically understands that such a compressed and formulaic story, being told with no substantiating details, and placing an unlikely combination of characters into an unlikely setting and involving them in an unrealistic plot, is the start of a joke, and the story that follows is not meant to be taken at face value (i.e. it is non-bona-fide communication). The framing itself invokes a play mode; if the audience is unable or unwilling to move into play, then nothing will seem funny.

=== Telling ===
Following its linguistic framing the joke, in the form of a story, can be told. It is not required to be verbatim text like other forms of oral literature such as riddles and proverbs. The teller can and does modify the text of the joke, depending both on memory and the present audience. The important characteristic is that the narrative is succinct, containing only those details which lead directly to an understanding and decoding of the punchline. This requires that it support the same (or similar) divergent scripts which are to be embodied in the punchline.

=== Punchline ===
The punchline is intended to make the audience laugh. A linguistic interpretation of this punchline/response is elucidated by Victor Raskin in his Script-based Semantic Theory of Humour. Humour is evoked when a trigger contained in the punchline causes the audience to abruptly shift its understanding of the story from the primary (or more obvious) interpretation to a secondary, opposing interpretation. "The punchline is the pivot on which the joke text turns as it signals the shift between the [semantic] scripts necessary to interpret [re-interpret] the joke text." To produce the humour in the verbal joke, the two interpretations (i.e. scripts) need to both be compatible with the joke text and opposite or incompatible with each other. Thomas R. Shultz, a psychologist, independently expands Raskin's linguistic theory to include "two stages of incongruity: perception and resolution." He explains that "… incongruity alone is insufficient to account for the structure of humour. […] Within this framework, humour appreciation is conceptualized as a biphasic sequence involving first the discovery of incongruity followed by a resolution of the incongruity." In the case of a joke, that resolution generates laughter.

This is the point at which the field of neurolinguistics offers some insight into the cognitive processing involved in this abrupt laughter at the punchline. Studies by the cognitive science researchers Coulson and Kutas directly address the theory of script switching articulated by Raskin in their work. The article "Getting it: Human event-related brain response to jokes in good and poor comprehenders" measures brain activity in response to reading jokes. Additional studies by others in the field support more generally the theory of two-stage processing of humour, as evidenced in the longer processing time they require. In the related field of neuroscience, it has been shown that the expression of laughter is caused by two partially independent neuronal pathways: an "involuntary" or "emotionally driven" system and a "voluntary" system. This study adds credence to the common experience when exposed to an off-colour joke; a laugh is followed in the next breath by a disclaimer: "Oh, that's bad…" Here the multiple steps in cognition are clearly evident in the stepped response, the perception being processed just a breath faster than the resolution of the moral/ethical content in the joke.

=== Response ===
Expected response to a joke is laughter. The joke teller hopes the audience "gets it" and is entertained. This leads to the premise that a joke is actually an "understanding test" between individuals and groups. If the listeners do not get the joke, they are not understanding the two scripts which are contained in the narrative as they were intended. Or they do "get it" and do not laugh; it might be too obscene, too gross or too dumb for the current audience. A woman might respond differently to a joke told by a male colleague around the water cooler than she would to the same joke overheard in a women's lavatory. A joke involving toilet humour may be funnier told on the playground at elementary school than on a college campus. The same joke will elicit different responses in different settings. The punchline in the joke remains the same, however, it is more or less appropriate depending on the current context.

=== Shifting contexts, shifting texts ===
The context explores the specific social situation in which joking occurs. The narrator automatically modifies the text of the joke to be acceptable to different audiences, while at the same time supporting the same divergent scripts in the punchline. The vocabulary used in telling the same joke at a university fraternity party and to one's grandmother might well vary. In each situation, it is important to identify both the narrator and the audience as well as their relationship with each other. This varies to reflect the complexities of a matrix of different social factors: age, sex, race, ethnicity, kinship, political views, religion, power relationships, etc. When all the potential combinations of such factors between the narrator and the audience are considered, then a single joke can take on infinite shades of meaning for each unique social setting.

The context, however, should not be confused with the function of the joking. "Function is essentially an abstraction made on the basis of a number of contexts". In one long-term observation of men coming off the late shift at a local café, joking with the waitresses was used to ascertain sexual availability for the evening. Different types of jokes, going from general to topical into explicitly sexual humour signalled openness on the part of the waitress for a connection. This study describes how jokes and joking are used to communicate much more than just good humour. That is a single example of the function of joking in a social setting, but there are others. Sometimes jokes are used simply to get to know someone better. What makes them laugh, what do they find funny? Jokes concerning politics, religion or sexual topics can be used effectively to gauge the attitude of the audience to any one of these topics. They can also be used as a marker of group identity, signalling either inclusion or exclusion for the group. Among pre-adolescents, "dirty" jokes allow them to share information about their changing bodies. And sometimes joking is just simple entertainment for a group of friends.

== Relationships ==
The context of joking in turn leads to a study of joking relationships, a term coined by anthropologists to refer to social groups within a culture who take part in institutionalised banter and joking. These relationships can be either one-way or a mutual back and forth between partners.

The joking relationship is defined as a peculiar combination of friendliness and antagonism. The behaviour is such that in any other social context it would express and arouse hostility; but it is not meant seriously and must not be taken seriously. There is a pretence of hostility along with a real friendliness. To put it in another way, the relationship is one of permitted disrespect.

Joking relationships were first described by anthropologists within kinship groups in Africa. But they have since been identified in cultures around the world, where jokes and joking are used to mark and reinforce appropriate boundaries of a relationship.

== Electronic ==
The advent of electronic communications at the end of the 20th century introduced new traditions into jokes. A verbal joke or cartoon is emailed to a friend or posted on a bulletin board; reactions include a replied email with a :-) or LOL, or a forward on to further recipients. Interaction is limited to the computer screen and for the most part solitary. While preserving the text of a joke, both context and variants are lost in internet joking; for the most part, emailed jokes are passed along verbatim. The framing of the joke frequently occurs in the subject line: "RE: laugh for the day" or something similar. The forward of an email joke can increase the number of recipients exponentially.

Internet joking forces a re-evaluation of social spaces and social groups. They are no longer only defined by physical presence and locality, they also exist in the connectivity in cyberspace. "The computer networks appear to make possible communities that, although physically dispersed, display attributes of the direct, unconstrained, unofficial exchanges folklorists typically concern themselves with". This is particularly evident in the spread of topical jokes, "that genre of lore in which whole crops of jokes spring up seemingly overnight around some sensational event … flourish briefly and then disappear, as the mass media move on to fresh maimings and new collective tragedies". This correlates with the new understanding of the internet as an "active folkloric space" with evolving social and cultural forces and clearly identifiable performers and audiences.

A study by the folklorist Bill Ellis documented how an evolving cycle was circulated over the internet. By accessing message boards that specialised in humour immediately following the 9/11 disaster, Ellis was able to observe in real-time both the topical jokes being posted electronically and responses to the jokes.

Previous folklore research has been limited to collecting and documenting successful jokes, and only after they had emerged and come to folklorists' attention. Now, an Internet-enhanced collection creates a time machine, as it were, where we can observe what happens in the period before the risible moment, when attempts at humour are unsuccessful

Access to archived message boards also enables us to track the development of a single joke thread in the context of a more complicated virtual conversation.

== Joke cycles ==
A joke cycle is a collection of jokes about a single target or situation which displays consistent narrative structure and type of humour. Some well-known cycles are elephant jokes using nonsense humour, dead baby jokes incorporating black humour, and light bulb jokes, which describe all kinds of operational stupidity. Joke cycles can centre on ethnic groups, professions (viola jokes), catastrophes, settings (…walks into a bar), absurd characters (wind-up dolls), or logical mechanisms which generate the humour (knock-knock jokes). A joke can be reused in different joke cycles; an example of this is the same Head & Shoulders joke refitted to the tragedies of Vic Morrow, Admiral Mountbatten and the crew of the Challenger space shuttle. (Note: How do we know that ___ had dandruff? They found his/her head and shoulders on the ___.) These cycles seem to appear spontaneously, spread rapidly across countries and borders only to dissipate after some time. Folklorists and others have studied individual joke cycles in an attempt to understand their function and significance within the culture.

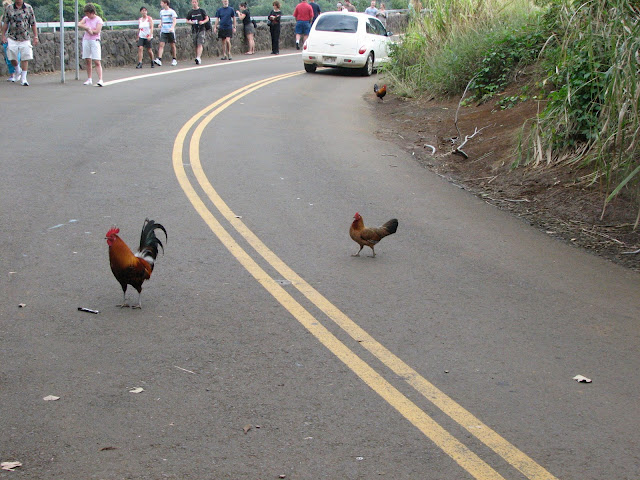
Why did the chicken cross the road? To get to the other side.

Joke cycles circulated in the recent past include:

- Conditional jokes
- Bar jokes
- Bellman jokes
- Blonde joke, lawyer joke and Microsoft joke cycles
- Burgenland jokes (Austria)
- Challenger (space shuttle) jokes
- Chernobyl jokes
- Chicken jokes
- Dead baby jokes
- Desert island jokes
- East Frisian jokes (Germany)
- Essex girl joke cycle (United Kingdom)
- Helen Keller joke cycle
- Irish jokes
- Jew and Polack joke cycles
- Jewish American Princess and Jewish Mother joke cycles
- Knock-knock jokes
- Lightbulb jokes
- Little Willie and Quadriplegic joke cycles
- Manta jokes (Germany)
- NASA joke cycle
- Newfie joke cycle (Canada)
- Persian Gulf War jokes
- Polish jokes
- Redneck jokes
- Riddle jokes
- Said the actress to the bishop jokes
- Sardarji jokes (India)
- Two cow jokes
- Viola jokes
- Wind-up doll joke cycle
- Yo Mama jokes

=== Tragedies and catastrophes ===
As with the 9/11 disaster discussed above, cycles attach themselves to celebrities or national catastrophes such as the death of Diana, Princess of Wales, the death of Michael Jackson, and the Space Shuttle Challenger disaster. These cycles arise regularly as a response to terrible unexpected events which command the national news. An in-depth analysis of the Challenger joke cycle documents a change in the type of humour circulated following the disaster, from February to March 1986. "It shows that the jokes appeared in distinct 'waves', the first responding to the disaster with clever wordplay and the second playing with grim and troubling images associated with the event…The primary social function of disaster jokes appears to be to provide closure to an event that provoked communal grieving, by signalling that it was time to move on and pay attention to more immediate concerns".

=== Ethnic jokes ===
The sociologist Christie Davies has written extensively on ethnic jokes told in countries around the world. In ethnic jokes he finds that the "stupid" ethnic target in the joke is no stranger to the culture, but rather a peripheral social group (geographic, economic, cultural, linguistic) well known to the joke tellers. So Americans tell jokes about Polacks and Italians, Germans tell jokes about Ostfriesens, and the English tell jokes about the Irish. In a review of Davies' theories it is said that "For Davies, [ethnic] jokes are more about how joke tellers imagine themselves than about how they imagine those others who serve as their putative targets…The jokes thus serve to center one in the world – to remind people of their place and to reassure them that they are in it."

=== Absurdities and gallows humour ===
A third category of joke cycles identifies absurd characters as the butt: for example the grape, the dead baby or the elephant. Beginning in the 1960s, social and cultural interpretations of these joke cycles, spearheaded by the folklorist Alan Dundes, began to appear in academic journals. Dead baby jokes are posited to reflect societal changes and guilt caused by widespread use of contraception and abortion beginning in the 1960s. (Note: Contraceptive pills were first approved for use in the United States in 1960.) Elephant jokes have been interpreted variously as stand-ins for American blacks during the Civil Rights Era or as an "image of something large and wild abroad in the land captur[ing] the sense of counterculture" of the sixties. These interpretations strive for a cultural understanding of the themes of these jokes which go beyond the simple collection and documentation undertaken previously by folklorists and ethnologists.

== Classification systems ==
As folktales and other types of oral literature became collectables throughout Europe in the 19th century (Brothers Grimm et al.), folklorists and anthropologists of the time needed a system to organise these items. The Aarne–Thompson classification system was first published in 1910 by Antti Aarne, and later expanded by Stith Thompson to become the most renowned classification system for European folktales and other types of oral literature. Its final section addresses anecdotes and jokes, listing traditional humorous tales ordered by their protagonist; "This section of the Index is essentially a classification of the older European jests, or merry tales – humorous stories characterized by short, fairly simple plots. …" Due to its focus on older tale types and obsolete actors (e.g., numbskull), the Aarne–Thompson Index does not provide much help in identifying and classifying the modern joke.

A more granular classification system used widely by folklorists and cultural anthropologists is the Thompson Motif Index, which separates tales into their individual story elements. This system enables jokes to be classified according to individual motifs included in the narrative: actors, items and incidents. It does not provide a system to classify the text by more than one element at a time while at the same time making it theoretically possible to classify the same text under multiple motifs.

The Thompson Motif Index has spawned further specialised motif indices, each of which focuses on a single aspect of one subset of jokes. A sampling of just a few of these specialised indices have been listed under other motif indices. Here one can select an index for medieval Spanish folk narratives, another index for linguistic verbal jokes, and a third one for sexual humour. To assist the researcher with this increasingly confusing situation, there are also multiple bibliographies of indices as well as a how-to guide on creating your own index.

Several difficulties have been identified with these systems of identifying oral narratives according to either tale types or story elements. A first major problem is their hierarchical organisation; one element of the narrative is selected as the major element, while all other parts are arrayed subordinate to this. A second problem with these systems is that the listed motifs are not qualitatively equal; actors, items and incidents are all considered side-by-side. And because incidents will always have at least one actor and usually have an item, most narratives can be ordered under multiple headings. This leads to confusion about both where to order an item and where to find it. A third significant problem is that the "excessive prudery" common in the middle of the 20th century means that obscene, sexual and scatological elements were regularly ignored in many of the indices.

The folklorist Robert Georges has summed up the concerns with these existing classification systems:

…Yet what the multiplicity and variety of sets and subsets reveal is that folklore [jokes] not only takes many forms, but that it is also multifaceted, with purpose, use, structure, content, style, and function all being relevant and important. Any one or combination of these multiple and varied aspects of a folklore example [such as jokes] might emerge as dominant in a specific situation or for a particular inquiry.

It has proven difficult to organise all different elements of a joke into a multi-dimensional classification system which could be of real value in the study and evaluation of this (primarily oral) complex narrative form.

The General Theory of Verbal Humour or GTVH, developed by the linguists Victor Raskin and Salvatore Attardo, attempts to do exactly this. This classification system was developed specifically for jokes and later expanded to include longer types of humorous narratives. Six different aspects of the narrative, labelled Knowledge Resources or KRs, can be evaluated largely independently of each other, and then combined into a concatenated classification label. These six KRs of the joke structure include:

1. Script Opposition (SO) references the script opposition included in Raskin's SSTH. This includes, among others, themes such as real (unreal), actual (non-actual), normal (abnormal), possible (impossible).
2. Logical Mechanism (LM) refers to the mechanism which connects the different scripts in the joke. These can range from a simple verbal technique like a pun to more complex LMs such as faulty logic or false analogies.
3. Situation (SI) can include objects, activities, instruments, props needed to tell the story.
4. Target (TA) identifies the actor(s) who become the "butt" of the joke. This labelling serves to develop and solidify stereotypes of ethnic groups, professions, etc.
5. Narrative strategy (NS) addresses the narrative format of the joke, as either a simple narrative, a dialogue, or a riddle. It attempts to classify the different genres and subgenres of verbal humour. In a subsequent study Attardo expands the NS to include oral and printed humorous narratives of any length, not just jokes.
6. Language (LA) "…contains all the information necessary for the verbalization of a text. It is responsible for the exact wording …and for the placement of the functional elements."

As development of the GTVH progressed, a hierarchy of the KRs was established to partially restrict the options for lower-level KRs depending on the KRs defined above them. For example, a lightbulb joke (SI) will always be in the form of a riddle (NS). Outside of these restrictions, the KRs can create a multitude of combinations, enabling a researcher to select jokes for analysis which contain only one or two defined KRs. It also allows for an evaluation of the similarity or dissimilarity of jokes depending on the similarity of their labels. "The GTVH presents itself as a mechanism … of generating [or describing] an infinite number of jokes by combining the various values that each parameter can take. … Descriptively, to analyze a joke in the GTVH consists of listing the values of the 6 KRs (with the caveat that TA and LM may be empty)." This classification system provides a functional multi-dimensional label for any joke, and indeed any verbal humour.

== Joke and humour research ==
Many academic disciplines lay claim to the study of jokes (and other forms of humour) as within their purview. Fortunately, there are enough jokes, good, bad and worse, to go around. The studies of jokes from each of the interested disciplines bring to mind the tale of the blind men and an elephant where the observations, although accurate reflections of their own competent methodological inquiry, frequently fail to grasp the beast in its entirety. This attests to the joke as a traditional narrative form which is indeed complex, concise and complete in and of itself. It requires a "multidisciplinary, interdisciplinary, and cross-disciplinary field of inquiry" to truly appreciate these nuggets of cultural insight. (Note: Our focus here is with the contemporary state of joke research. A more extensive survey of the history of various humour theories can be found under the topic theories of humor.)

=== Psychology ===
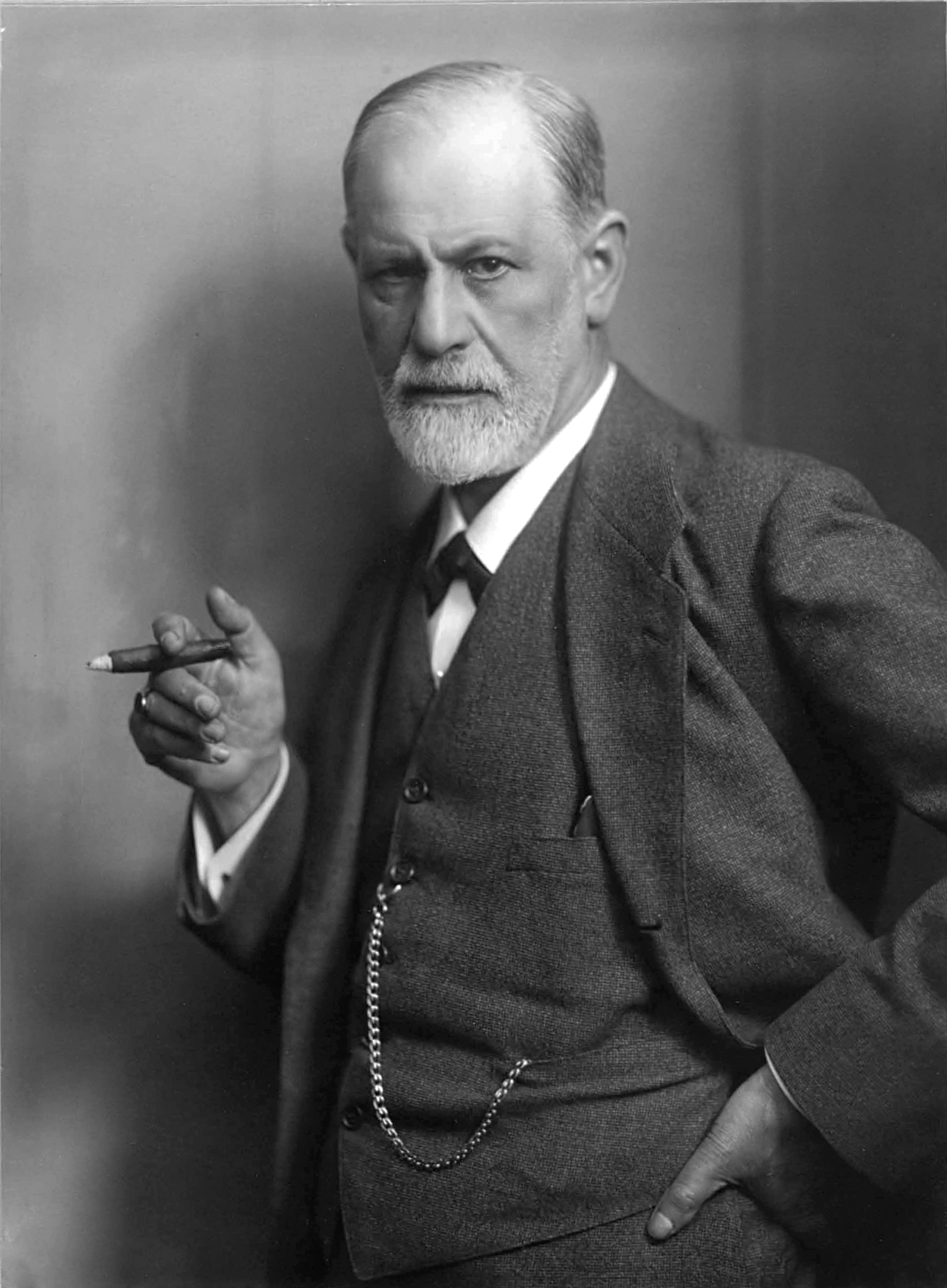
Sigmund Freud

Sigmund Freud was one of the first modern scholars to recognise jokes as an important object of investigation. In his 1905 study Jokes and their Relation to the Unconscious Freud describes the social nature of humour and illustrates his text with many examples of contemporary Viennese jokes. His work is particularly noteworthy in this context because Freud distinguishes in his writings between jokes, humour and the comic. These are distinctions which become easily blurred in many subsequent studies where everything funny tends to be gathered under the umbrella term of "humour", making for a much more diffuse discussion.

Since the publication of Freud's study, psychologists have continued to explore humour and jokes in their quest to explain, predict and control an individual's "sense of humour". Why do people laugh? Why do people find something funny? Can jokes predict character, or vice versa, can character predict the jokes an individual laughs at? What is a "sense of humour"? A current review of the popular magazine Psychology Today lists over 200 articles discussing various aspects of humour; in psychological jargon, the subject area has become both an emotion to measure and a tool to use in diagnostics and treatment. A new psychological assessment tool, the Values in Action Inventory developed by the American psychologists Christopher Peterson and Martin Seligman includes humour (and playfulness) as one of the core character strengths of an individual. As such, it could be a good predictor of life satisfaction. For psychologists, it would be useful to measure both how much of this strength an individual has and how it can be measurably increased.

A 2007 survey of existing tools to measure humour identified more than 60 psychological measurement instruments. These measurement tools use many different approaches to quantify humour along with its related states and traits. There are tools to measure an individual's physical response by their smile; the Facial Action Coding System (FACS) is one of several tools used to identify any one of multiple types of smiles. Or the laugh can be measured to calculate the funniness response of an individual; multiple types of laughter have been identified. It must be stressed here that both smiles and laughter are not always a response to something funny. In trying to develop a measurement tool, most systems use "jokes and cartoons" as their test materials. However, because no two tools use the same jokes, and across languages this would not be feasible, how does one determine that the assessment objects are comparable? Moving on, whom does one ask to rate the sense of humour of an individual? Does one ask the person themselves, an impartial observer, or their family, friends and colleagues? Furthermore, has the current mood of the test subjects been considered; someone with a recent death in the family might not be much prone to laughter. Given the plethora of variants revealed by even a superficial glance at the problem, it becomes evident that these paths of scientific inquiry are mined with problematic pitfalls and questionable solutions.

The psychologist Willibald Ruch has been very active in the research of humour. He has collaborated with the linguists Raskin and Attardo on their General Theory of Verbal Humour (GTVH) classification system. Their goal is to empirically test both the six autonomous classification types (KRs) and the hierarchical ordering of these KRs. Advancement in this direction would be a win-win for both fields of study; linguistics would have empirical verification of this multi-dimensional classification system for jokes, and psychology would have a standardised joke classification with which they could develop verifiably comparable measurement tools.

=== Linguistics ===
"The linguistics of humor has made gigantic strides forward in the last decade and a half and replaced the psychology of humor as the most advanced theoretical approach to the study of this important and universal human faculty." This recent statement by one noted linguist and humour researcher describes, from his perspective, contemporary linguistic humour research. Linguists study words, how words are strung together to build sentences, how sentences create meaning which can be communicated from one individual to another, and how our interaction with each other using words creates discourse. Jokes have been defined above as oral narratives in which words and sentences are engineered to build toward a punchline. The linguist's question is: what exactly makes the punchline funny? This question focuses on how the words used in the punchline create humour, in contrast to the psychologist's concern (see above) with the audience's response to the punchline. The assessment of humour by psychologists "is made from the individual's perspective; e.g. the phenomenon associated with responding to or creating humor and not a description of humor itself." Linguistics, on the other hand, endeavours to provide a precise description of what makes a text funny.

Two major new linguistic theories have been developed and tested within the last decades. The first was advanced by Victor Raskin in "Semantic Mechanisms of Humor", published 1985. While being a variant on the more general concepts of the incongruity theory of humour, it is the first theory to identify its approach as exclusively linguistic. The Script-based Semantic Theory of Humour (SSTH) begins by identifying two linguistic conditions which make a text funny. It then goes on to identify the mechanisms involved in creating the punchline. This theory established the semantic/pragmatic foundation of humour as well as the humour competence of speakers. (Note: i.e. The necessary and sufficient conditions for a text to be funny)

Several years later the SSTH was incorporated into a more expansive theory of jokes put forth by Raskin and his colleague Salvatore Attardo. In the General Theory of Verbal Humour, the SSTH was relabelled as a Logical Mechanism (LM) (referring to the mechanism which connects the different linguistic scripts in the joke) and added to five other independent Knowledge Resources (KR). Together these six KRs could now function as a multi-dimensional descriptive label for any piece of humorous text.

Linguistics has developed further methodological tools which can be applied to jokes: discourse analysis and conversation analysis of joking. Both of these subspecialties within the field focus on "naturally occurring" language use, i.e. the analysis of real (usually recorded) conversations. One of these studies has already been discussed above, where Harvey Sacks describes in detail the sequential organisation in telling a single joke. Discourse analysis emphasises the entire context of social joking, the social interaction which cradles the words.

=== Folklore and anthropology ===
Folklore and cultural anthropology have perhaps the strongest claims on jokes as belonging to their bailiwick. Jokes remain one of the few remaining forms of traditional folk literature transmitted orally in western cultures. Identified as one of the "simple forms" of oral literature by André Jolles in 1930, they have been collected and studied since there were folklorists and anthropologists abroad in the lands. As a genre they were important enough at the beginning of the 20th century to be included under their own heading in the Aarne–Thompson index first published in 1910: Anecdotes and jokes.

Beginning in the 1960s, cultural researchers began to expand their role from collectors and archivists of "folk ideas" to a more active role of interpreters of cultural artefacts. One of the foremost scholars active during this transitional time was the folklorist Alan Dundes. He started asking questions of tradition and transmission with the key observation that "No piece of folklore continues to be transmitted unless it means something, even if neither the speaker nor the audience can articulate what that meaning might be." In the context of jokes, this then becomes the basis for further research. Why is the joke told right now? Only in this expanded perspective is an understanding of its meaning to the participants possible.

This questioning resulted in a blossoming of monographs to explore the significance of many joke cycles. What is so funny about absurd nonsense elephant jokes? Why make light of dead babies? In an article on contemporary German jokes about Auschwitz and the Holocaust, Dundes justifies this research:

Whether one finds Auschwitz jokes funny or not is not an issue. This material exists and should be recorded. Jokes are always an important barometer of the attitudes of a group. The jokes exist and they obviously must fill some psychic need for those individuals who tell them and those who listen to them.

A stimulating generation of new humour theories flourishes like mushrooms in the undergrowth: Elliott Oring's theoretical discussions on "appropriate ambiguity" and Amy Carrell's hypothesis of an "audience-based theory of verbal humor (1993)" to name just a few.

In his book Humor and Laughter: An Anthropological Approach, the anthropologist Mahadev Apte presents a solid case for his own academic perspective. "Two axioms underlie my discussion, namely, that humor is by and large culture based and that humor can be a major conceptual and methodological tool for gaining insights into cultural systems." Apte goes on to call for legitimising the field of humour research as "humorology"; this would be a field of study incorporating an interdisciplinary character of humour studies.

While the label "humorology" has yet to become a household word, great strides are being made in the international recognition of this interdisciplinary field of research. The International Society for Humor Studies was founded in 1989 with the stated purpose to "promote, stimulate and encourage the interdisciplinary study of humour; to support and cooperate with local, national, and international organizations having similar purposes; to organize and arrange meetings; and to issue and encourage publications concerning the purpose of the society". It also publishes Humor: International Journal of Humor Research and holds yearly conferences to promote and inform its speciality.

=== Physiology of laughter ===
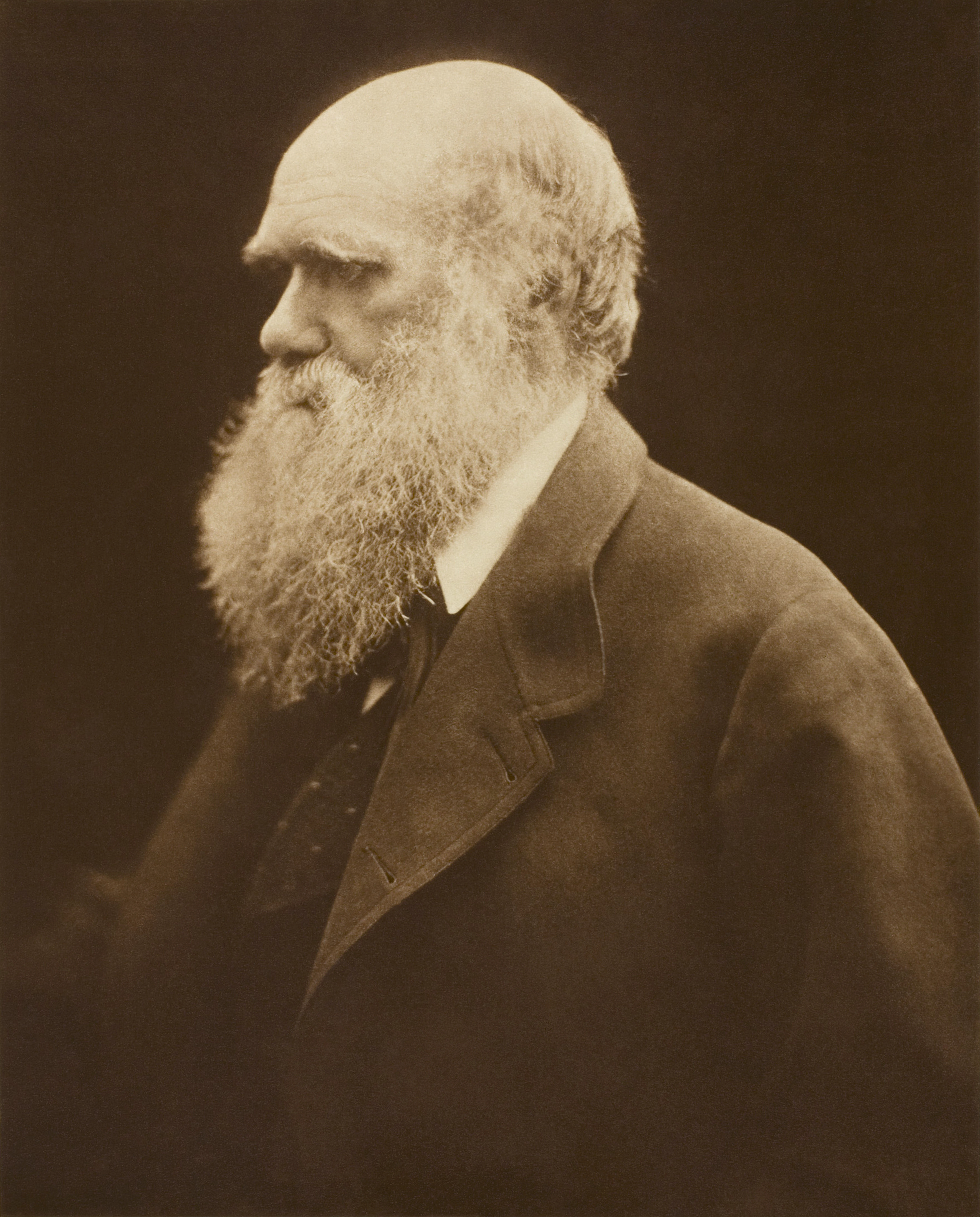
Charles Darwin in his later years

In 1872, Charles Darwin published one of the first "comprehensive and in many ways remarkably accurate description of laughter in terms of respiration, vocalization, facial action and gesture and posture" (Laughter) in The Expression of the Emotions in Man and Animals. In this early study Darwin raises further questions about who laughs and why they laugh; the myriad responses since then illustrate the complexities of this behaviour. To understand laughter in humans and other primates, the science of gelotology (from the Greek gelos, meaning laughter) has been established; it is the study of laughter and its effects on the body from both a psychological and physiological perspective. While jokes can provoke laughter, laughter cannot be used as a one-to-one marker of jokes because there are multiple stimuli to laughter, humour being just one of them. The other six causes of laughter listed are social context, ignorance, anxiety, derision, acting apology, and tickling. As such, the study of laughter is a secondary albeit entertaining perspective in an understanding of jokes.

=== Computational humour ===
Computational humour is a new field of study which uses computers to model humour; it bridges the disciplines of computational linguistics and artificial intelligence. A primary ambition of this field is to develop computer programs which can both generate a joke and recognise a text snippet as a joke. Early programming attempts have dealt almost exclusively with punning because this lends itself to simple straightforward rules. These primitive programs display no intelligence; instead, they work off a template with a finite set of pre-defined punning options upon which to build.

More sophisticated computer joke programs have yet to be developed. Based on our understanding of the SSTH / GTVH humour theories, it is easy to see why. The linguistic scripts (a.k.a. frames) referenced in these theories include, for any given word, a "large chunk of semantic information surrounding the word and evoked by it [...] a cognitive structure internalized by the native speaker". These scripts extend much further than the lexical definition of a word; they contain the speaker's complete knowledge of the concept as it exists in his world. As insentient machines, computers lack the encyclopaedic scripts which humans gain through life experience. They also lack the ability to gather the experiences needed to build wide-ranging semantic scripts and understand language in a broader context, a context that any child picks up in daily interaction with his environment.

Further development in this field must wait until computational linguists have succeeded in programming a computer with an ontological semantic natural language processing system. It is only "the most complex linguistic structures [which] can serve any formal and/or computational treatment of humor well". Toy systems (i.e. dummy punning programs) are completely inadequate to the task. Despite the fact that the field of computational humour is small and underdeveloped, it is encouraging to note the many interdisciplinary efforts which are currently underway.

== See also ==
- List of humour research publications
- Index of joke types
