= Blason populaire =

Any item of any genre which makes use of stereotypes of a particular group

Blason populaire is an umbrella genre in the field of folkloristics used to designate any item of any genre which makes use of stereotypes, usually, but not always, negative stereotypes, of a particular group. "These stereotypes are manifested in a wide array of folkloric genres, including proverbs, other traditional sayings, nicknames, jokes, songs, rhymes, and football chants. All share a common function in that they are invoked to highlight positive aspects of the in-group by explicit auto-stereotyping or, alternatively, to identify the negative characteristics of out-groups. The explicit positive stereotyping of an in-group may often implicitly suggest negative characteristics of a rival out-group." In blasons populaires nations are homogeneous and have national characteristics.

Items such as ethnic jokes or blonde jokes are very common examples of blason populaire.

== Form and role of blason populaire ==
Blason populaire represents an expression of traditional rivalry and a form of traditional insulting also seen in flyting. They may take the form of ethnic jokes, ethnic stereotypes, football chants, traditional nicknames and other forms.

Blason populaire performs a number of roles in society, such as social cohesion, by defining group behaviour or characteristics and contrasting those with another (alien, outsider or 'out group') group. This can be on a geographical, social, sex, occupation or pastime basis. For example, in one form blason populaire often seeks to undermine the masculinity of a rival group of males, or insult the appearance or chastity of the females of the rival group. Football chants often make reference to male players, officials or supporters being homosexual, effeminate or in some way not sufficiently masculine.

The purpose of such insults is to create a sense of superiority and cohesion amongst the group doing the insulting. Such traditional insults are a way of defusing aggression in a similar way to flyting, as wit is valued over mere insult. The response of the offended group is expected to be to return the insult in a witty fashion. However, these exchanges can spill over into physical aggression if offence is taken by either group.

== British blason populaire ==
There is a rich tradition of blason populaire in the UK, which takes many forms. It can occur between regions (England, Wales, Scotland, Ireland) and even within regions at a county or town level.

In British culture, the Welsh are lampooned sexually for sleeping with sheep, the Scottish for being tight-fisted, the Irish for being stupid and the English for being sexually uptight and unable to express emotions. Stereotypes of the home nations form a traditional structure used in Englishman, Irishman, Scotsman jokes.

At a county level, blason populaire is expressed in traditional rhymes and epithets. It ranges from mild leg pulling to viciously insulting.

Examples of humorous epithets in the UK include Scarborough which is known locally as Scarbados, a humorous comparison with Barbados, a commentary on its sunny but cold weather, and an attempt to deflect the snobbery of people who holiday in Scarborough. Similarly Salford is called Costa Del Salford because unlike the costas of Spain it has very poor climate and is not by the sea but on a river. People from Doncaster are called flatlanders by their neighbours in Sheffield, to contrast the low-lying area from the more hilly city of Sheffield. People from Doncaster are called Doncastafarians by their neighbours in nearby Nottinghamshire, because of their perceived love of rap music and culture.

Stereotypes can be expressed more elaborately:

"Lincolnshire born, Lincolnshire bred | Strong in the arm but weak in the head."

This traditional English blason populaire is from Nottinghamshire, but the county that is accused of being strong bodied but weak minded (stupid) varies according to location. Yorkshire is often substituted for Lincolnshire. The traditional comeback to this rhyme is to explain that weak comes from the Old English wic meaning clever.

In another example, Yorkshire people may describe themselves as strong, hard-working, honest, thrifty and straightforward. In blason populaire these qualities are humorously turned into weaknesses. The Yorkshireman is portrayed as too blunt and mean in the well-known blason populaire "a Yorkshireman is a Scotsman with all the generosity squeezed out of him". This refers to another blason populaire (that Scots are mean) to intensify the insult. This stereotype can also be seen in the Yorkshireman's Motto:

Ear all, see all, say nowt;
Eyt all, sup all, pay nowt;
And if ivver tha does owt fer nowt –
Allus do it fer thissen.

Hear all, see all, say nothing;
Eat all, drink all, pay nothing;
And if you ever do anything for nothing;
Always do it for yourself;

The UK also has a strong tradition of football-based blason populaire. Here the group bonding aim is present but there is also a more direct intent: to insult players to put them off their game. Officials and rival fans are also insulted through chants and songs. This is strongly correlated with flyting where the game of football is a ritualised form of battle. In football chants the opposition team or its players can be slated, or the football players of the home team lauded for being heroes or having their male characteristics exaggerated to emphasise their superiority. A chant about player Romelu Lukaku is an example of this:

E's our Belgium scoring genius
He's got a 24-inch penis
Scoring all the goals
Bellend to his toes.

Although this chant is not derogatory against the target per se (it was chanted by his supporters), it was later discouraged by Manchester United for expressing a stereotype of black men. Other examples have been used against players referencing their behaviour off field to put them off their game on field. Among these, John Terry inspired a number of offensive chants ("He's shagging the ref, He's shagging the ref") which referenced his infidelity, and Wayne Rooney because he allegedly slept with a much older woman ("Fat granny shagger, you're just a fat granny shagger").

== Blason Populaires in Irish proverbial material ==
The focus of blasons populaires in Irish-language proverbial material is primarily regional, as opposed to national or ethnic, and, furthermore, such proverbs are usually jocular, descriptive, and benign, rarely exhibiting ethnic or racial slurs. Exceptions to the non-nationalistic tendency are often blasons populaires of the multi-group international comparison, manifested in epigrammatic form in European languages, with the most salient and representative stereotypical trait being attributed to the nations involved (what Billig (1995) refers to as 'banal nationalism'). Enumerative structures, usually tri- or quadripartite formulas, are the favoured apparatus. The syntactic and semantic juxtaposition of negative traits for comparative purposes is then counter-balanced by the positive representation of one nation, usually in final position, most commonly the in-group that invokes the comparison. Below is a nineteenth-century German example (Reinsberg-Düringsfeld 1863, 5) in which there is no apparent in-group.

Die Italiener fluchen, Die Franzosen schreien, Die Engländer essen, Die Spanier trotzen, Und die Deutschen betrinken sich.
The Italians curse, the French scream, the English eat, the Spanish defy, and the Germans get drunk.

== Blasons populaires in Wallonia and Luxembourg ==
In Wallonia (Belgium) and Luxembourg, the concept of "blason populaire" refers to a demonym-like nickname of the inhabitants of a village or a city.

Blasons populaire come from the traditional languages (Walloon, Luxembourgish). They are never translated in French, as opposed to the demonyms which exist in French and in Walloon, often in two different constructions.

Some, which have lost their pejorative meaning, are now used to name restaurants, theater groups, communal houses, etc. They are also used in pseudonyms of writers in Walloon.

Town	Blason	English
Ansart (province Luxembourg)	Wardeûs d'oyes (Walloon)	Guardians of geese
Ath (Hainault)	Les Bourjoûs d'Ât (Picard)	The burghers of Ath
Sivry (Hainault)	Chés gâtes ed Chevi (Picard)	The goats of Sivry
Péruwelz (Hainault)	Chés casseux d'Quinquets d'Piérwé (Picard)	The breakers of Quinquet lamps

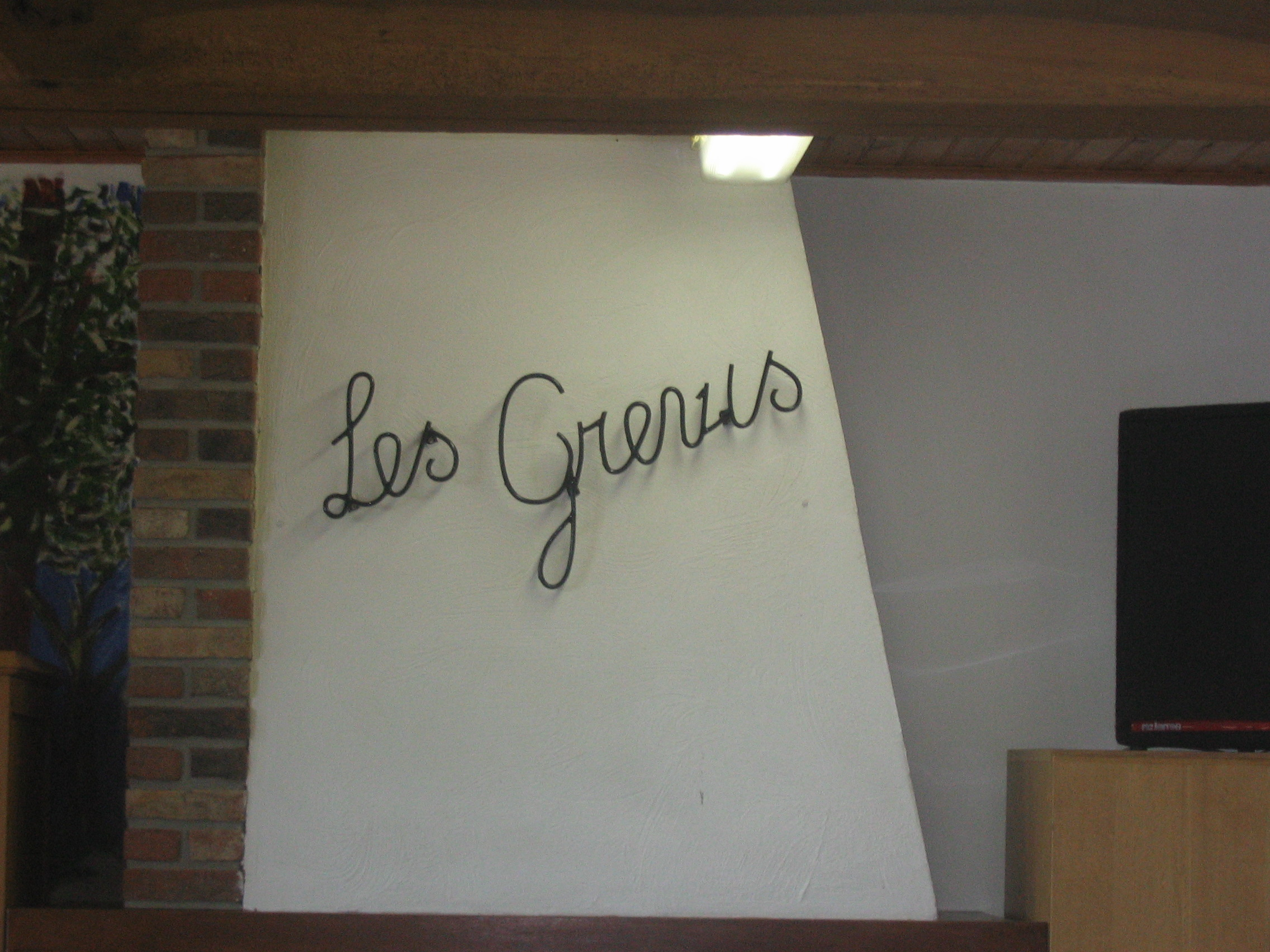
Nickname "Les grevîs" (Walloon "graevî", minnow) in the communal house of Rimagne (Remagne)

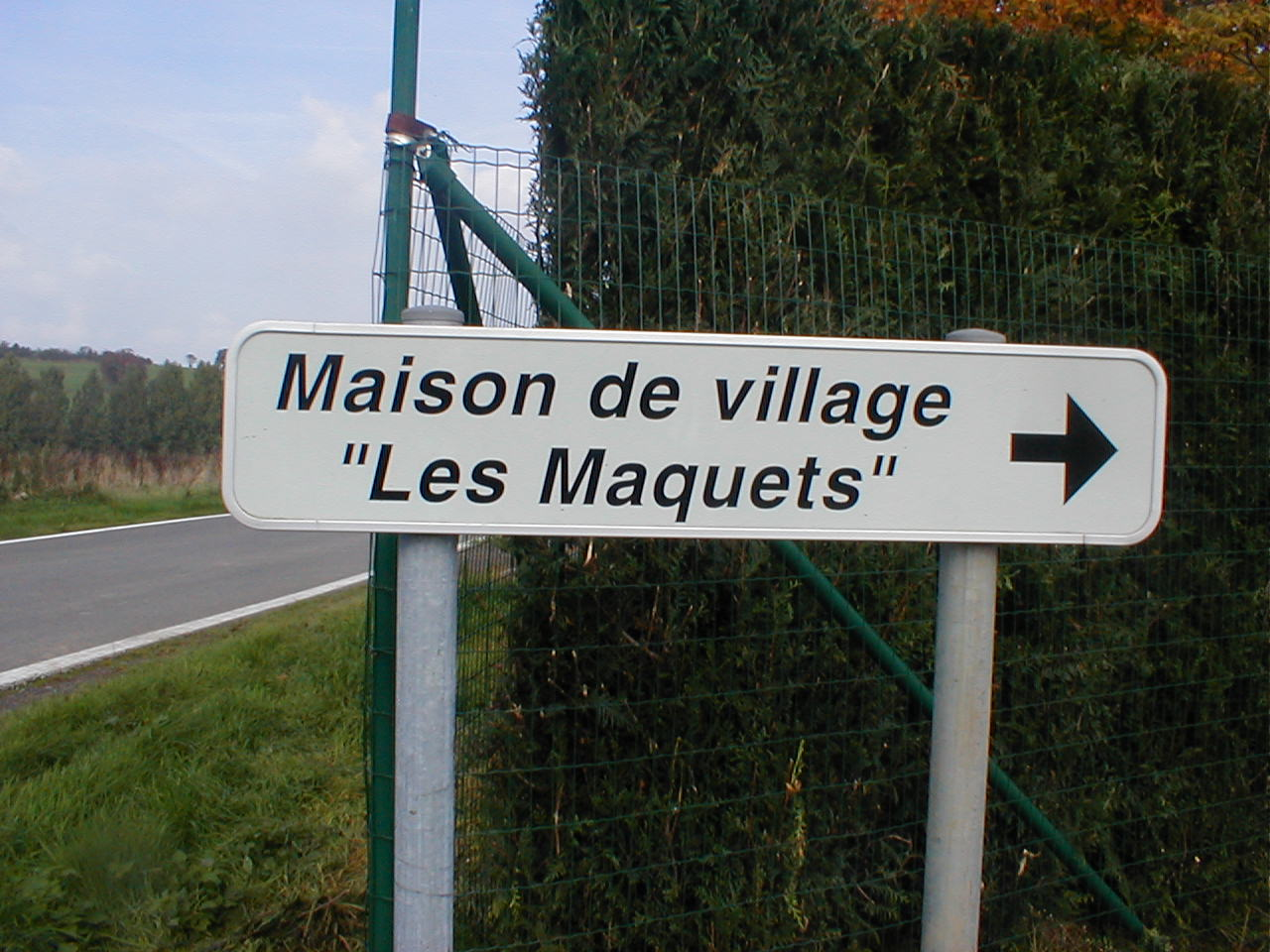
Nickname "Les maquets" (French rewriting of the walloon name "maké", stunned) to call a communal house in Ver (Custinne)

== Blasons populaires in Picardie and Nord-Pas-de-Calais ==
The inhabitants of all villages or cities in these regions have a blason populaire (in Picard language: surpitchet).

For example, for the town of Amiens the blason is chés Maqueus d'gueugues d'Anmien ('the Eaters of Walnuts of Amiens'). In 1597, Spanish soldiers mounted a surprise attack. They were disguised as peasants and put walnuts at the doors of the town. The inhabitants were famished and opened the doors, following which the Spanish soldiers entered the city; with deadly consequences for the inhabitants.

Town	Department	Picard	French	English
Soissons	Aisne	chés Béyeux	les bouches bées	open-mouthed
Laon	Aisne	chés glorieus d'Laon	les fiers de Laon	the proud [people] of Laon
Saint-Quentin	Aisne	chés cannoniers d'Saint-Quintin	les querelleurs de Saint-Quentin	the scrappers of Saint-Quentin
Arras	Pas-de-Calais	chés boïaux rouches d'Aro	les boyaux rouges d'Arras	the red guts of Arras
Lille	Nord	chés burgeos d'Lille	les bourgeois de Lille	the burghers of Lille

== See also ==
- Town of fools
- Ethnic jokes
- An Englishman, an Irishman and a Scotsman
- Florida man
