= Lawyer joke =

Jokes about lawyers

Lawyer jokes, which pre-date Shakespeare's era, are commonly told by those outside the profession as an expression of contempt, scorn and derision. They serve as a form of social commentary or satire reflecting the cultural perception of lawyers.

== Historical examples ==
Shakespeare's Henry VI, Part 2 has the joke:

The first thing we do, let's kill all the lawyers

— "Dick the Butcher" in Shakespeare's Henry VI, Part 2, act 4, scene 2, line 73

In 1728, John Gay wrote this verse as part of The Beggar's Opera:

A Fox may steal your hens, sir
A Whore your health and pence, sir
Your daughter rob your chest, sir
Your wife may steal your rest, sir
A thief your goods and plate
But this is all but picking
With rest, pence, chest and chicken
It ever was decreed, sir
If Lawyer's Hand is fee'd, sir
He steals your whole estate

At the end of the 1800s, Ambrose Bierce satirically defined litigation as "a machine which you go into as a pig and come out as a sausage".

The line "Doesn't it strike the company as a little unusual that a lawyer should have his hands in his own pockets?" is cited by Samuel Clemens (Mark Twain) but likely originated earlier.

== Recurring themes ==
In the modern era, many complaints about lawyers fall into five general categories:

- abuse of litigation in various ways, including using dilatory tactics and false evidence and making frivolous arguments to the courts
- preparation of false documentation, such as false deeds, contracts, or wills
- deceiving clients and other persons and misappropriating property
- procrastination in dealings with clients
- charging excessive fees

A recurring theme, historically and today, is that of exorbitant legal fees consuming the entire value of property at stake in an estate or a dispute:

How many lawyers does it take to change a light bulb?
How many can you afford?

Or:

It takes only one lawyer to change your lightbulb to his lightbulb.

The tale of the freshly-acquitted horse thief pleading that the judge issue an arrest warrant for "that dirty lawyer of mine" because "Your honour, you see, I didn't have the money to pay his fee, so he went and took the horse I stole" is often modernised to "he went and took the car I stole" with little or nothing else changed.

While telling an ethnic joke risks the label of racism, lawyers are perceived as a highly privileged class, seemingly accountable only to other lawyers; the Bar Association, the judges, even many of the politicians and legislators are their fellow lawyers who inevitably give them free rein. After all, one does not choose one's ethnicity but may choose whether to pursue a career in law.

Of those of all the professions, lawyer jokes are often the most blunt and to the point:

What is the difference between a catfish and a lawyer?
One is a scum-sucking, bottom-feeding scavenger. The other is just a fish.

Or:

Why don't sharks eat lawyers?
Professional courtesy.

Much like the 'foul-mouthed parrot' or the 'dumb blonde', the 'heartless and cynical attorney' is a common character in many joke collections.

Often told is the anecdote where a wealthy lawyer, solicited for a charitable donation, replies "Do you realise my mother is dying of a long-term illness and has medical bills several times her income? Did you know that my brother, a disabled veteran, is blind and in a wheelchair? Do you understand my sister is widowed and penniless with three dependent children? Well, since I don't give any money to them, why should I give any to you?"

Similarly:

Lawyer: "I have some good news for you."
Client: "What good news? You lost my case, I was convicted of a murder I did not commit and was sentenced to die in the electric chair."
Lawyer: "That's all true, but I got the voltage lowered."

Other anecdotes are based on logical fallacy, such as a lawyer defending a client on trial for killing his parents: "Ladies and gentlemen of the jury, I appeal to your basic decency to take mercy on this poor, defenceless orphan!"

Occasionally, lawyers themselves use self-deprecating humour about lawyers or the legal profession in an attempt to add levity to otherwise bland topics. Lawyers giving a talk, especially to the profession, often employ jokes as icebreakers.

St. Ives is the patron saint of lawyers. In some jokes, he is the only lawyer in heaven, and cannot be made to leave, since there is no other lawyer in heaven.

== Gag names ==
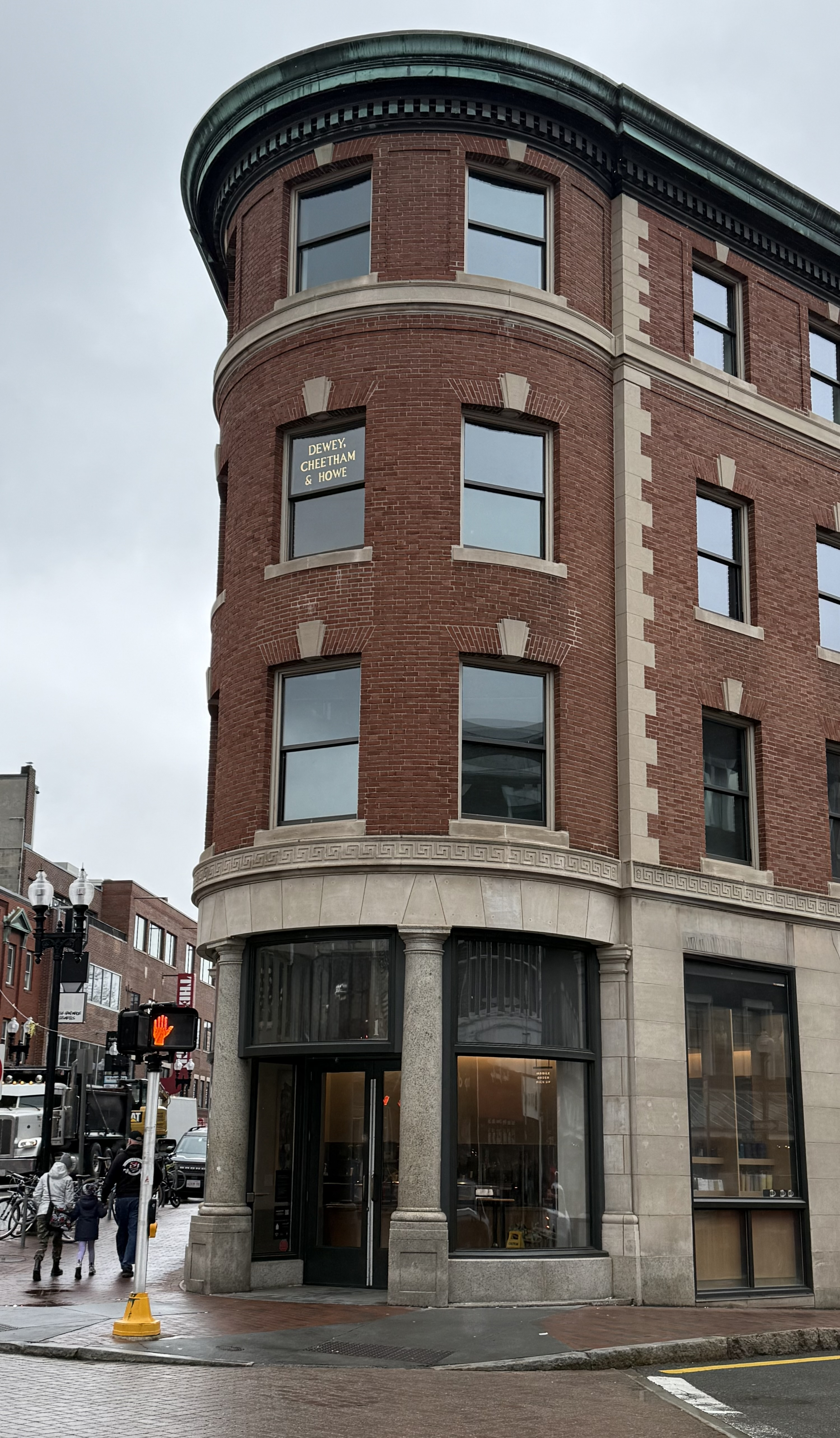
The name of the Dewey, Cheetham & Howe corporate offices (otherwise known as the headquarters of the radio show Car Talk) is visible in 2025 on the third-floor window above the corner of Brattle and JFK Streets, in Harvard Square, Cambridge, Massachusetts.

A common theme in lawyer jokes is to present a lawyer or law firm, particularly in parody settings, with a gag name such as the commonly used "Dewey, Cheatem & Howe" (a pun on the phrase "Do we cheat 'em? And how!"). The gag name pokes fun at the perceived propensity of legal professionals to take advantage of their clients. This gag name is also used more broadly as a placeholder for any hypothetical law firm. In this variation, the second name often varies somewhat with regards to spelling (Cheetem, Cheater, Cheethem, Cheatham, etc.), but also to the word upon which it is based (Screwum, Burnham, etc.). Another example is "Sue, Grabbit and Runne", often used as a comedic stand-in for defamation lawyers in the UK.

A popular poster for The Three Stooges features the Stooges as bumbling members of such a firm, with the actual episode using the name "Dewey, Burnham, and Howe". The 2012 Three Stooges film uses this example, among similar ones such as proctologists "Proba, Keister, and Wince", divorce lawyers "Ditcher, Quick, and Hyde", and attorneys at law "Kickham, Harter, and Indagroyne". In the film Heavenly Daze, Moe and Larry deal with a crooked attorney named "I. Fleecem" (I fleece 'em). Catherine O'Hara used the phrase in the premiere 1986 edition of HBO's telethon "Comic Relief", and Soupy Sales claimed that it was the name of his law firm in 1972. "Sue, Grabbitt and Runne" recurred in the British satirical magazine Private Eye. Tom and Ray Magliozzi, of NPR's Car Talk radio program, named their business corporation "Dewey, Cheetham & Howe". In 2001, a banker in Texas, who had experience coming up with gag names for staff training, reported a cashier's check to the FBI when he noticed it was payable to "Howe" or "Howie Dewey Cheatham", leading to the client's conviction for money laundering and fraud.

== See also ==
- "When a man argues against two beautiful ladies like this, they are going to have the last word", an infamous joke told by a lawyer
