= Little rabbit jokes =

Joke cycle popular in 1970s East Germany

Little rabbit jokes (German: Häschenwitze) were a type of joke that became popular in the 1970s, first in East Germany and later in West Germany. The little rabbit joke first emerged in East Germany in the early 1970s as a politically subversive joke. In West Germany, little rabbit jokes were hardly ever considered anything more than corny.

== Plot ==
The jokes' basic plot is that of a little rabbit visiting a shop, a doctor's practice, the authorities, or any such place, and asking, "Hattu Möhrchen?" (Do you have carrots?). The punch line, often a simple pun, follows in the answer. In variations, the little rabbit asks for unusual things, e.g. cold coffee or something rabbit-specific like carrot cake.

An important part of these jokes is the assumed inability of rabbits to pronounce certain sounds of human speech due to their big incisors, especially where consonant clusters are concerned. Thus, the rabbit says "Hattu" instead of "Hast Du" (Do you have), and "Muttu" instead of "Musst Du" (You have to).

=== Example ===
A rabbit enters a record store and asks the saleswoman: "Hattu Platten?" (Do you have records?; Platten being a homonym of a flat tire). When she answers in the affirmative, the rabbit replies: "Muttu aufpumpen!" (Then you have to inflate it).

== Origin ==
The little rabbit joke first emerged in East Germany in the early 1970s as a politically subversive joke. Little rabbit jokes often caricatured the shortage economy in the "real socialist" German Democratic Republic. One of the earliest reports of a little rabbit joke dates back to 1976, when West German visitors of the Festival of Political Songs were told the following joke:

A rabbit enters a pharmacy and asks: "Do you have carrots?" The pharmacist replies: "No." On the next day, the rabbit returns and asks again: "Do you have carrots?" The pharmacist once again replies: "No." On the third day, a sign at the pharmacy's door says: "Today no carrots!" The rabbit complains to the pharmacist: "So you had carrots after all."

In West Germany, little rabbit jokes were hardly ever considered anything more than corny. While popular with children, comedians were less enthused. While Dutch comedian Rudi Carrell described the jokes as "the stupidest thing that ever existed in Germany", his German counterparts Otto Waalkes and Dieter Hallervorden described them as "appalling" and representing "a dark chapter of the standards of German humor", respectively.
