= An Englishman, an Irishman and a Scotsman =

Pattern for jokes

"An Englishman, an Irishman and a Scotsman" is the opening line of a category of joke cycle popular in Ireland and the United Kingdom. The nationalities involved may vary, though they are usually restricted to those within Ireland and the UK, and the number of people involved is usually three or sometimes four. In Ireland the characters are sometimes called "Paddy Irishman, Paddy Englishman and Paddy Scotsman". Depending on who is telling the joke, one nationality fares well and the others fare poorly according to national stereotypes. For example, in England the punchline is usually based around the Irishman being stupid, the Scotsman being mean (i.e. miserly), and the Englishman being posh (or a snob but ultimately not the butt of the joke), whereas in Scotland and Ireland the Englishman will typically be the butt of the joke. Sometimes, when the joke requires four people, a Welshman is brought in.

== Form ==
The joke starts with the home or favoured nationality and ends with the nationality and associated stereotype against which the joke is made. For example, in England, the joke begins "An Englishman, an Irishman and a Scotsman..." whereas in Ireland it begins "Paddy Irishman, Paddy Englishman and Paddy Scotsman".

The joke typically places the three characters in a scenario. How each person in the joke reacts to the scenario is then explained in order by person, the final reaction being the punch line, playing up to the stereotype of that nationality. The joke uses the rule of three, the first two characters being used to set up an expectation which is then subverted in some way by the third.

An Englishman, an Irishman, and a Scotsman were in a pub, talking about their sons. "My son was born on St George's Day," commented the English man. "So we obviously decided to call him George." "That’s a real coincidence," remarked the Scot. "My son was born on St Andrew's Day, so obviously we decided to call him Andrew." "That’s incredible, what a coincidence," said the Irishman. "Exactly the same thing happened with my son Pancake."

== National variations ==
The "three nationalities" joke format is common in other countries. In these cases, the two foreigners are almost always portrayed as cocky, stupid, or naïve, while the home national is smart, practical, or in any case ultimately victorious.

- in Poland, as "A Pole, a German and a Russian..."
- in the Czech Republic, as "A Czech, an American and a Russian..."
- in Scandinavia, as "A Swede, a Dane and a Norwegian..."
- in Finland, as "A Finn, a Swede and a Norwegian..."
- in Brazil, as "A Brazilian, an American and a Portuguese/Argentinian..."

== See also ==
- Bar joke
- Bellman joke
- Ethnic joke
- Russian jokes
