= Wind-up toy =

Toy powered by a clockwork motor

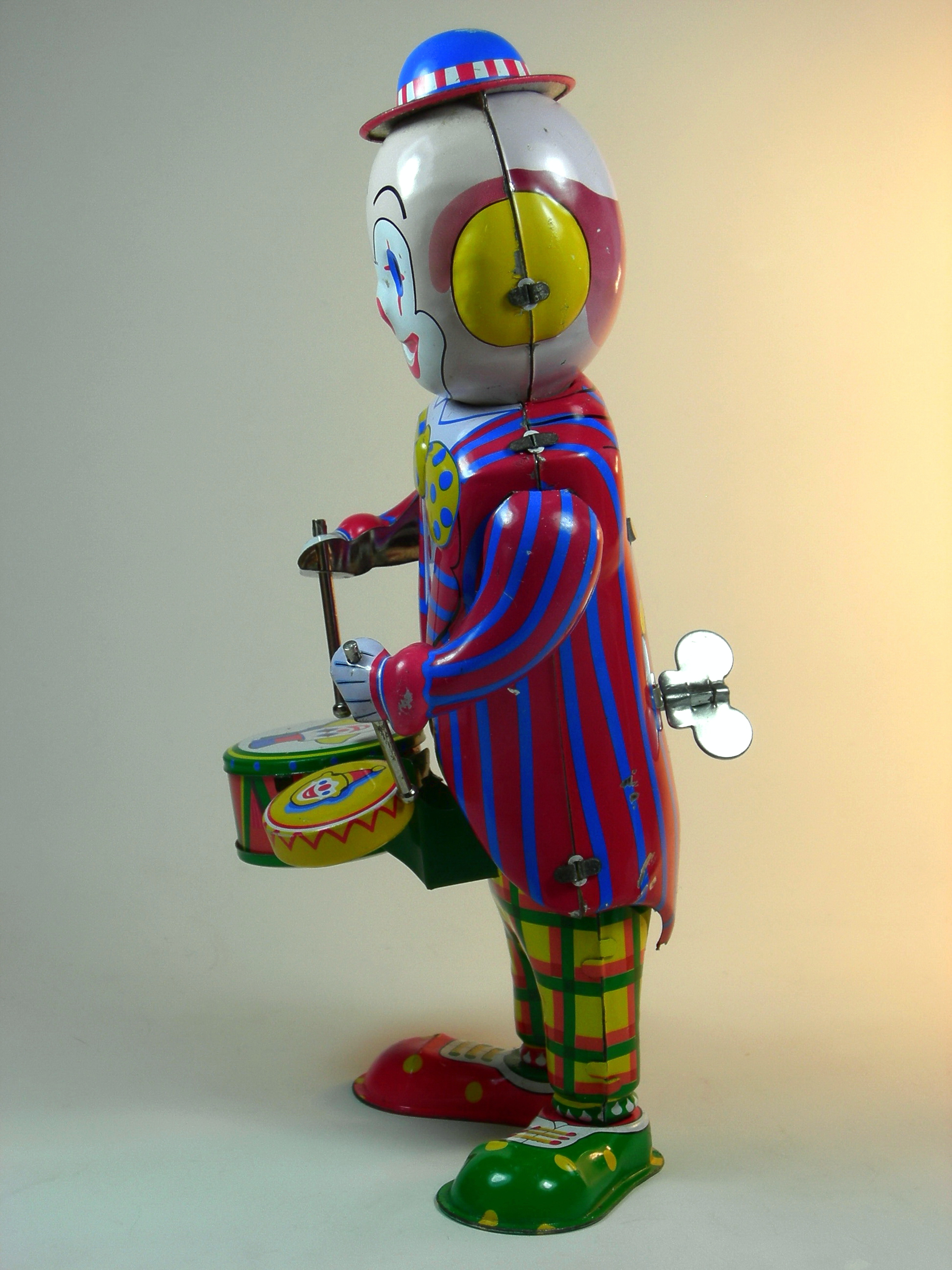
A wind-up toy clown, the winding key being visible on the toy's back

A wind-up toy is an automaton toy powered by a clockwork motor.

== Background ==
Automata built for the sake of art, amusement, and simulation have been described since antiquity, in cases such as Heron of Alexandria designing clockwork birds during the Hellenistic Period. Leonardo da Vinci is frequently credited with constructing a mechanical lion, which he presented to King Francois I in Lyon in 1515. Although no record of the device's original designs remain, a recreation of this piece is housed at the Château du Clos Lucé.

Some misinformation exists with regards to Regiomontanus's contribution, and his supposed construction of a flight-capable mechanical eagle and fly, which are frequently credited as the first wind-up toys. This story of an eagle which flew from Nuremberg to greet Friedrich III, alongside that of a fly which could circulate the room before returning to its inventor's hand, was spread by Petrus Ramus after a visit to Nuremberg in 1571, and is apparently false. Furthermore, various internet sites instead credit these inventions to a Karel Grod, but little evidence suggests he exists.

René Descartes may have attempted to build some automata. According to legend, a life-sized wind-up human girl was discovered in his luggage aboard a ship in which he was traveling to Sweden, and was thrown overboard by order of the ship's Captain.

== History ==
After the larger, elaborate wind-up machine art declined in interest, wind-up toys were created cheaply in large numbers by the 1800s. Wind-up machines became known as wind-up toys, and were designed in different forms to move around. European toy makers created and mass-produced the first wind-up tin toys during the late 1880s. Over the next 60 to 70 years, more manufacturers created more intricate designs. The trend stopped with the introduction of the small and inexpensive Alkaline battery in the 1960s, which allowed motors to run without a wind-up mechanism. Over the next 20 years, wind-up toys lost popularity.

Plastic wind-ups started in 1977 when the Japanese company Tomy made a walking Robot (Rascal Robot). Tomy's ability to build small precise plastic gears and parts allowed them to reduce the size of the gearbox (housing the spring drive).

== See also ==
- Wind-up doll joke
- Pullback motor
