= Three Wolf Moon =

T-shirt with three wolves howling at the Moon

The original Three Wolf Moon T-shirt

Three Wolf Moon is a T-shirt featuring three wolves howling at the Moon. The numerous satirical reviews for this on Amazon.com have become an Internet phenomenon. The T-shirt was designed by artist Antonia Neshev.

== Origin ==
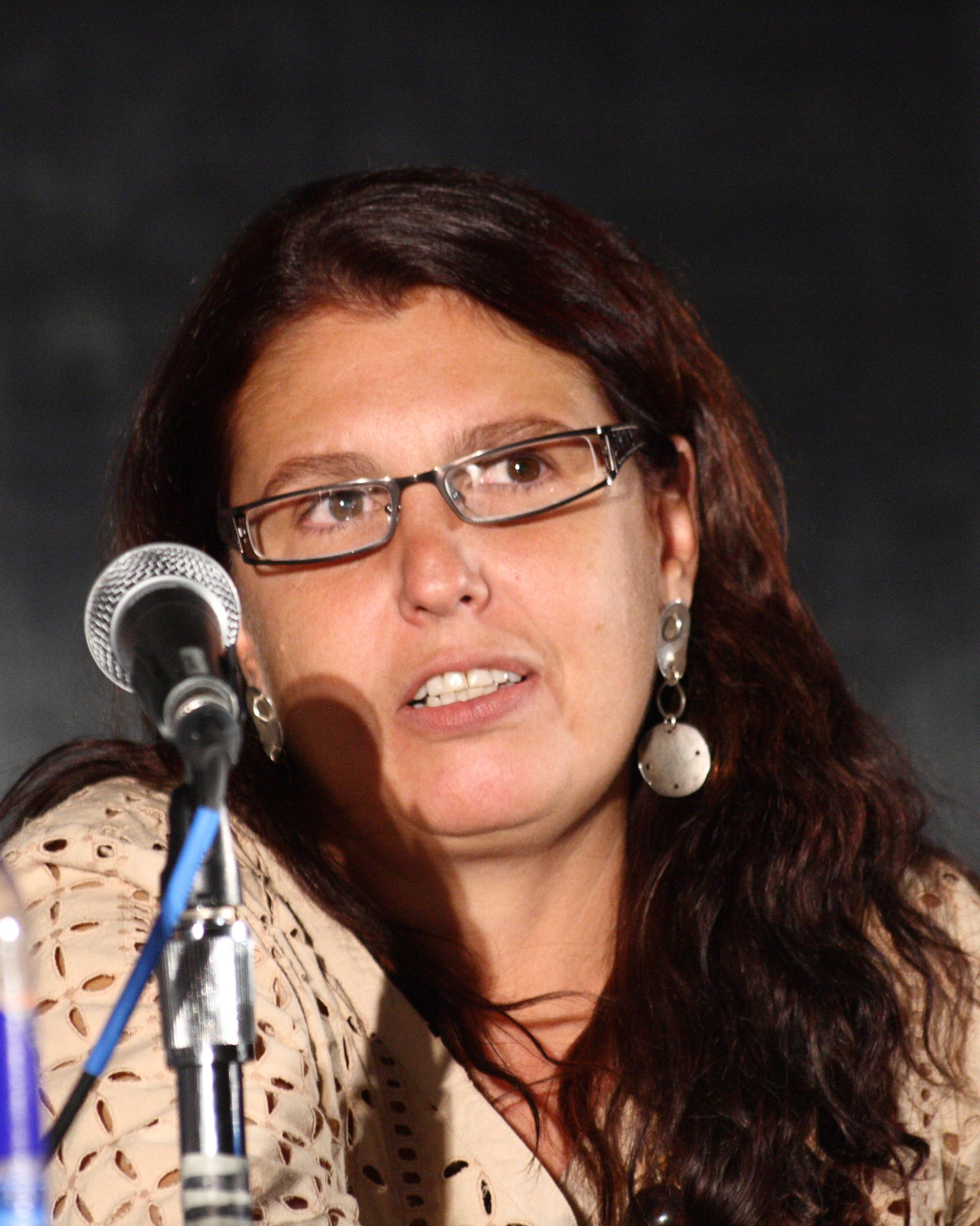
Antonia Neshev, creator of the Three Wolf Moon design

The Three Wolf Moon T-shirt, created by The Mountain Corporation, gained popularity after attracting sarcastic reviews on Amazon.com (and chosens) attributing great power to it, such as making the wearer irresistible to women, striking fear into other males, and having magical healing abilities. Brian Govern, a law student at Rutgers University, was searching for a school book on Amazon and was led to the Three Wolf Moon T-shirt by an Amazon recommendation which had been targeted at students purchasing college semester books. He decided to write a review of the shirt on a whim as he did not actually own the shirt. His faux-serious review as "Bee-Dot-Govern" in November 2008 concluded:

Pros: Fits my girthy frame, has wolves on it, attracts women
Cons: Only 3 wolves (could probably use a few more on the 'guns'), cannot see wolves when sitting with arms crossed, wolves would have been better if they glowed in the dark.

Since this original review was posted, more than 2,300 similar reviews have been posted. Some reviewers have uploaded images showing famous people wearing the shirt.

The shirt attracted further interest when it became popular on networking sites such as Digg and Facebook and was then lauded in conventional media as an Internet phenomenon. German scholar Melvin Haack considers it to be a notable example of a redneck joke. The reviews have been included in studies of such online sarcasm. Such sarcasm tends to confound analysis of customer reviews and so the texts have been analysed to determine which elements might identify sarcasm. One common example found in n-gram analysis was "alpha male".

== Sales ==
The T-shirt is manufactured by The Mountain Corporation, a wholesale clothing company in Keene, New Hampshire, United States. Its art director, Michael McGloin, said that the company was making many more shirts in response to the great demand that had made it the top-selling item in Amazon's clothing store. Due to the success of the shirt, the New Hampshire Division of Economic Development made it its "official New Hampshire T-shirt of economic development" and awarded it as a prize for innovation.

== Parodies and attributions ==
A similar shirt featuring Keyboard Cats instead of wolves has been produced at the T-shirt design site Threadless. In July 2009, this was the most highly rated design there.

Capcom prepared a limited run through iam8bit of a "Three Wolf God Sun" shirt for the 2010 San Diego Comic-Con, featuring images of the wolf gods Shiranui, Amaterasu and Chibiterasu from their video games Ōkami and Ōkamiden.

Minecraft parodied the design in its merchandise, replacing the wolves with creepers, an enemy featured in the game.

In the 2022 episode "Thanks to Them", the third season premiere of The Owl House, the character Hunter creates a parody of the shirt while he, along with much of the show's other supporting cast, is stuck on Earth temporarily living with series protagonist Luz Noceda and her mother Camila following the events of the previous episode and second season finale, "King's Tide", proclaiming his love for wolves as "mystical beasts". While making the shirt, Hunter accidentally pricked his finger on the sewing machine's needle, which becomes relevant later in the episode.

Georgetown University created a parody of the "Three Wolf Moon" shirt using images of its mascot, Jack the Bulldog, as a promotion for students attending a 2015 basketball game.

World of Warcraft created a parody of the "Three Wolf Moon" shirt on their Blizzard Gear store, instead featuring a version that displayed three ducks howling at the moon, aptly named "Three Duck Moon."

Look Outside, an indie game, has a character in-game, Sybil, who wears a rendition of the 'Three Wolf Moon' T-Shirt, which now has only two wolves.

Comedian Brent Terhune parodied the design in his merchandise, replacing the wolves with pictures of Mike Pence.

In 2020, American comedian Shayne Topp played a character named "Spencer Agnew" (commonly known as "The Chosen") during the "Viva Smosh Vegas" series on Smosh Games. The character is known for wearing the 'Three Wolf Moon' T-shirt, cargo shorts, sunglasses, and is occasionally seen wielding a katana.
