= Polish joke =

Class of joke involving Polish stereotypes

- Alternative name: Polack joke
- Type of joke: Ethnic joke
- Target of joke: Polish people
- Language: English

A Polish joke is an English-language ethnic joke deriding Polish people, based on derogatory stereotypes. The Polish joke belongs in the category of conditional jokes, whose full understanding requires the audience to have prior knowledge of what a Polish joke is. As with all discriminatory jokes, Polish jokes depend on the listener's preconceived notions and antipathies.

The relation between the internalized derogatory stereotypes about Polish people, and the persistence of ethnic jokes about them, is not easy to trace, though the jokes seem to be understood by many who hear them. Sometimes an offensive term for a Pole, such as Polack, is used in the joke.

Example:

Q: How many Polacks does it take to change a light bulb?
A: Three – one to hold the bulb, and two to turn the ladder.

== History ==
Some early 20th-century Polish jokes may have been told originally before World War II in disputed border regions such as Silesia, suggesting that Polish jokes did not originate in Nazi Germany but rather much earlier as an outgrowth of regional jokes rooted in historical discrimination of Poles in German-ruled areas, at least from the 18th-century Partitions of Poland, and actively pursued from the end of the 19th century by the government-backed German Eastern Marches Society, resulting in social class differences. Nonetheless, these jokes were later fuelled by ethnic slurs disseminated by German warlords and National Socialist propaganda that attempted to justify Nazi crimes against ethnic Poles by representing Poles as dirty and relegating them as inferior on the basis of their not being German.

Polish Americans became the subject of derogatory jokes at the time when Polish immigrants moved to the United States in considerable numbers fleeing mass persecution at home perpetrated under Prussian and Russian rule. They took the only jobs available to them, usually requiring physical labor. The same job-related stereotypes persisted even as Polish Americans joined the middle class in the mid 20th century. During the Cold War era, despite the sympathy in the US for Poland being subjected to communism, negative stereotypes about Polish Americans endured, mainly because of Hollywood/TV media involvement.

Some Polish jokes were brought to the United States by German displaced persons fleeing war-torn Europe in the late 1940s. During the political transformations of the Soviet controlled Eastern bloc in the 1980s, the much earlier German anti-Polish sentiment—dating at least to the policies of Otto von Bismarck and the persecution of Poles under the German Empire—was revived in East Germany against Solidarność (Solidarity). Polish jokes became common, reminding some of the spread of such jokes under the Nazis.

According to Christie Davies, American versions of Polish jokes are an unrelated "purely American phenomenon" and do not express the "historical Old World hatreds". Researchers of the Polish American Journal argue instead that Nazi and Soviet propaganda shaped the perception of Poles.

== Negative stereotypes ==
=== United States ===
Debate continues whether the early Polish jokes brought to states like Wisconsin by German immigrants were directly related to the wave of American jokes of the early 1960s. Since the late 1960s, Polish American organizations made continuous efforts to challenge the negative stereotyping of Polish people once prevalent in the US media. In the 1960s and 70s, television shows such as All in the Family, The Tonight Show, and Laugh-In often used jokes perceived by Polish Americans as demeaning. The Polish jokes heard in the 1970s led the Polish Ministry of Foreign Affairs to approach the U.S. State Department to complain, a move that ultimately had no effect. The 2010 documentary film Polack by James Kenney explores the source of the Polish joke in America, tracing it through history and into contemporary politics. The depiction of Polish Americans in the play Polish Joke by David Ives has resulted in a number of complaints by the Polish diaspora in the United States.

The book Hollywood's War with Poland shows how Hollywood's World War II (and onwards) negative portrayal of Polish people as being "backward", helped condition the American people to see Polish people as having inferior intelligence. The book supports the Polish-American Journal's assertion that Hollywood historically was fertile ground for anti-Polish prejudice, based on Hollywood's left-wing and Soviet sympathies.

The Polish American Congress Anti-Bigotry Committee was created in the early 1980s to fight anti-Polish sentiment, expressed for example in Polish jokes. Notable public cases include protests against the use of Polish jokes by Drew Carey (early 2000s) and Jimmy Kimmel (2013), both on the ABC network.

=== Germany ===
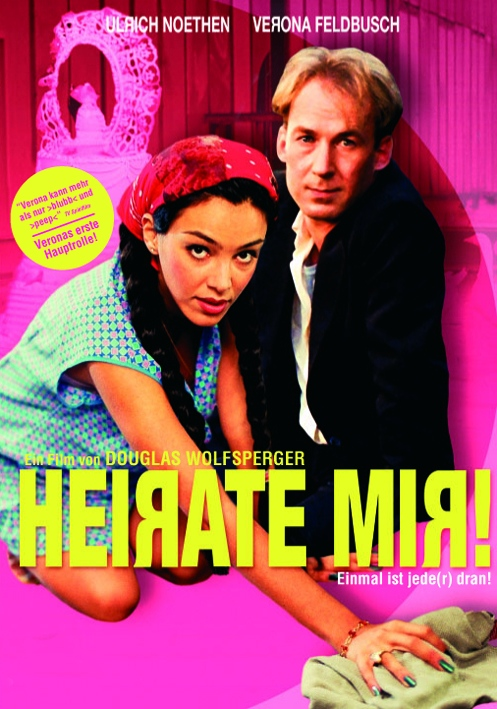
Movie poster for 1999 film Heirate mir (Marry to Me, with broken German grammar and Faux Cyrillic 'Rs') about a stereotypical Polish cleaner played by Bolivian-born Verona Feldbusch

In the 1990s, popular culture in Germany experienced a surge of Polish jokes. In their televisions shows, entertainers such as Harald Schmidt and Thomas Koschwitz made jokes about the Polish economy and about increased automobile thefts in Germany, attributed to Poles:

Q. Was ist der neueste Werbeslogan der Tourismus-Branche für Polen?
A. "Kommen Sie nach Polen – Ihr Auto ist schon da."

English translation:

Q. What is the latest slogan promoting tourism to Poland?
A. "Come to Poland! Your car's already here!"

The Bild tabloid employed stereotypical headlines about Poland. This triggered public outrage among German and Polish intellectuals, but in the latter half of the decade, fears of theft had even led to a decrease in German tourists visiting Poland. The greatest percentage of foreign tourists in Poland, exceeding 1.3 million annually, arrive from Germany. In recent decades, it has been observed that the public image of Poland in Germany itself was largely shaped by stereotypical jokes.

== See also ==
- Lightbulb joke
- Polandball
- Polish parliament (expression)
- Blason populaire
