= Monsieur et Madame jokes =

French joke form

A Monsieur et Madame joke is originally a French type of joke, which takes the form of a riddle. It involves providing the surname of a husband and wife and asking for their child's given name, with the answer forming a pun. For example, Monsier and Madame Mauve are said to have a son called Guy, where his name is a homophone for guimauve ("marshmallow").

== History ==
The inventor of this type of joke has never been clearly determined. Several historic examples have been recorded.

=== Origins ===
Wordplay that links an actual surname (or a title) to an imaginary family name has been around since the 18th century:

- In 1770, Marquis de Bièvre invented comtesse Tation and l'abbé Quille.
  - comtesse Tation – same pronunciation in French as contestation ("dispute")
  - l'abbé Quille – same pronunciation as la béquille ("the crutch")
- In 1882, Alphonse Allais invented Jean Rougy de Ontt, Tony Truand, Tom Hatt, Sarah Vigott, Azutat Laure.
  - Jean Rougy de Ontt – j'en rougis de honte ("I blush from shame")
  - Tom Hatt – tomate ("tomato")
- In 1893, Christophe from the comic strip La Famille Fenouillard invented Guy Mauve and Max Hillaire.
  - Guy Mauve – guimauve ("marshmallow")
  - Max Hillaire – maxillaire ("upper jaw")

=== The game of in-memoriam ===
- In late 1964, Juliette Gréco and Françoise Sagan popularized a basic version of the game under the name of "Game of in-memoriam", which was widely exchanged among Parisians.
- In early 1965, Paris Match made it widely-known across France in its first issue of the year, number 823, by publishing over several weeks the best "in-memoriam" from its readers.
- In 1978, Georges Perec created an example in Life: A User's Manual:

"M. et Mme Hocquard de Tours (I. & V.) have the joy of announcing the birth of their son Adhémar.".

— (a [= elle] démarre au quart de tour), referring to a car that "starts within a quarter turn" (from the time cars were cranked manually).

=== The first Monsieur et Madame jokes ===
- In 1969, during the shooting of Claude Chabrol's film This Man Must Die, Michel Duchaussoy and Jean Yanne played this game.

They found:

  - Judas ... Nana (jus d'ananas → pineapple juice)
  - Elvira ... Sacuti (elle vira sa cuti → she dramatically changed her mind)
  - Ferdinand ... Saint-Malo à la nage c'est pas d'la tarte (faire Dinan – Saint-Malo à la nage, c'est pas d'la tarte → swimming from Dinan to Saint-Malo is not a piece of cake)

Mr. and Mrs. Gre have a daughter, what's her name?
- Nadine! (Gre, Nadine → grenadine)

== In French culture ==
=== Music ===
The song Le Papa du papa (1966) by Boby Lapointe is based partially on this idea, mixing births, marriages, genealogy, first names and extended surnames in a complicated manner, in order to end up in the last line with a son with the contrived name of:

- Yvan-Sévère-Aimé Bossac de Noyau Dépêche
  - same pronunciation as: il vend ses verres et mes beaux sacs de noyaux de pêche, meaning "he sells his glasses and my beautiful bags of peach stones"

=== Comic strip ===
Example of a dialogue :

Monsieur et Madame Naiempalépourmoinsqueça ont un fils...

- Jean?

Goscinny / Tabary, La Tête de turc d'Iznogoud

=== Theatre ===
In the 1972 play Le noir te va si bien, Maria Pacôme and Jean le Poulain play a « surname game » (with « Mr. and Mrs. have... »), with the loser having to throw him or herself off a cliff. Following the example (the daughter of Micoton (Mylène)), they successively came up with: the son of Danleta (Alphonse), the son of Teuzemani (Gédéon), the daughter of Enfaillite (Mélusine) and the son of Dalor (Homère).

=== Other media ===
- In Les deux minutes du peuple, François Pérusse regularly makes such jokes.
- Michel Leeb based a skit on the joke, Monsieur et Madame ont un fils, where he tries to explain the nature of the joke to a madame Menvussa.

=== Television series ===
This type of word play was also used by Bart and Lisa in their telephone gags, in the series The Simpsons.

== In English ==
"Mr & Mrs jokes" have been commonly featured in the "late arrivals" round of the radio panel show "I'm Sorry I Haven't a Clue", broadcast on BBC Radio 4 since 1972, where the contestants announce the arrival of fictional guests. For example, "And will you welcome Mr and Mrs O'Reef, and their wonderful son Great Barry O'Reef!"

"And will you welcome Mr and Mrs Bee, and their homeless airline pilot son Flight Officer Bum Bill Bee!"

== Use in speech therapy ==
The joke has been employed by some speech therapists as an activity while interacting with adolescents. It may be done in the usual form, or in reverse: the therapist gives the first name, and the adolescent needs to find the surname.

== See also ==
- Knock-knock joke
- Titegoutte
- Word play
- aptonym
