= Drummer jokes =

Humour at the expense of drummers

Drummer jokes are jokes that are directed at drummers and percussionists, often impugning their musicianship or intelligence. They have circulated since the early 20th century; a 1930 article in the magazine The Ludwig Drummer referred to the joke "ten musicians and drummer" as "an old saying".

Drummer jokes typically try to show them as lacking civilised behaviour or musical proficiency, with occasional references to a lack of mental agility and timekeeping ability. The jokes have arisen because of drummers' reputation as being wild and savage, as demonstrated by the Muppet Animal, the Who's Keith Moon, Led Zeppelin's John Bonham and Mötley Crüe's Tommy Lee. According to a study in Brain and Behavior in December 2019, however, drummers' brains are actually better connected because of the continual and repetitive practice. This thickens the fibers in the main connecting tract between the brain's two halves, and allows better organisation for motor skills. Comedian Al Murray, who is a drummer in his band Fat Cops, says the jokes are completely inaccurate, and force drummers together as a community.

Since the 1990s, there have been several websites dedicated to drummer jokes. In 2014, David Singleton's alter ego The Vicar produced a drummer joke app for iOS, described as "so simple, even a drummer could use it". An obituary of Rush drummer Neil Peart in Billboard said he was "an extraordinary being sent to Earth to destroy drummer jokes".

== Examples ==
What's the difference between a drum machine and a drummer?
You only have to punch the song into the drum machine once!

What do you call someone who hangs around musicians?
A drummer.

What's the last thing you're likely to hear a drummer say?
Hey guys, do you want to play one of my songs?

A variation on drummer jokes plays on the fact that they are more likely to be fans of famous drummers than musicians generally.

How many drummers does it take to change a light bulb?
12 - one to change the bulb, and 11 to talk about how Buddy Rich would have done it!

== See also ==
- Viola jokes
