= Viola jokes =

Humor on instrument and its players

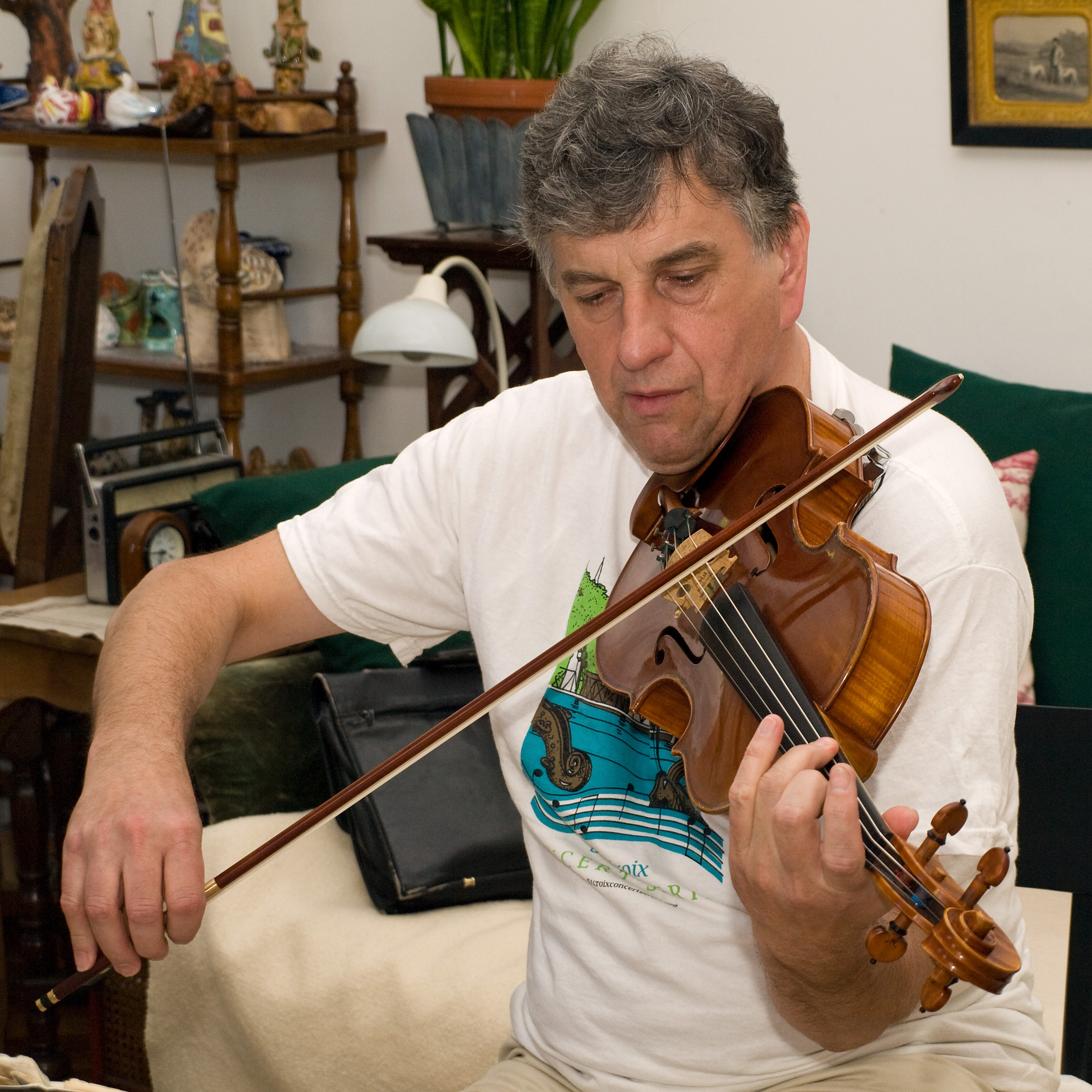
Viola players have been the subject of jokes since the 1700s.

Jokes directed towards violas and viola players are thought to have largely originated in the 18th century. Violas at the time were mainly used for relatively easy parts and as accompaniment, rather than as solo instruments; violists were generally low-paid and of lower social standing.

A story from Italy in the early 1700s is thought to be the origin of many viola jokes:

The violinist Francesco Geminiani arrived in London in 1714, one of the many expatriate musicians who settled in England in the late seventeenth and early eighteenth centuries ... As a young man Geminiani was appointed head of the orchestra in Naples, where according to English music historian Charles Burney he was "so wild and unsteady a timist, that instead of regulating and conducting the band, he threw it into confusion", and was demoted to playing the viola.

Viola jokes take many different forms, some only understandable by musicians and those acquainted with musical terms, others requiring no specialist musical knowledge. Some jokes make fun of the viola itself while others make fun of violists, while some jokes are directed in the opposite direction: jokes about musicians who tell viola jokes.

Examples of viola jokes, past and modern include:

- "How can you tell if a viola player is playing out of tune? The bow is moving."
  This joke resembles a common joke: "How can you tell if a politician is lying? - His lips are moving."
- "What's the difference between a viola player and a pizza? A pizza can feed a family of four."
- "What's the difference between a viola and a coffin? Coffins have dead people on the inside."
- "What is the only thing a violinist can do better than a viola player? Play the viola."
- "What do you call a forgotten violin? A viola."
- "What is the definition of a minor second? Two viola players playing in unison."
  Explanation: The minor second is the smallest musical interval in Western music. When two notes with this interval are played simultaneously, this usually represents a dissonance. The joke is that the violists are off pitch, and when playing in unison, produce a minor second instead.
- "Why is a viola solo like premature ejaculation? Because even when you know it's coming, there's nothing you can do about it."
- ·What are many violas playing an open C called? A cluster chord.

== See also ==
- Drummer jokes
