= Wind-up doll joke =

Series of jokes mocking well known people

Wind-up doll jokes (or simply doll jokes) is a series of jokes in which an imagined wind-up doll of a well known person (a show business or sports celebrity or a politician) acts in a way supposedly peculiar to this person. An example is given in the biography of Miles Davis by John Szwed. Miles had a habit to walk to the back of the band after finishing his solo, which was called "turning his back on the audience" by press. George Crater of the Down Beat magazine cracked the following joke: "Question: What does a Miles Davis doll do if you wind it up? - Answer: It turns its back on you!" A possible explanation of the appearance of this kind of jokes is that dolls of celebrities have long been part of American culture.

These jokes are among relatively few examples of American folklore recorded by folklorists close to the time of their origination. They started to be transmitted verbally in the fall of 1960 in the Los Angeles area, and in two years they found their way to major popular periodicals as a new fad. They were variously called "Living Dolls" and "Topical Dolls", but the "wind-up doll" was the most common term. A significant part of them had a character of sick jokes: "The cerebral palsy doll: wind it up and it sings, I'll Never Walk Alone".

This fad produced a book, Dolls My Mother Never Gave Me, by Jack Wohl & Stan Rice (1962).
