= Desert island joke =

Class of joke about being stranded on a deserted island

A typical desert island in cartoons

Desert island jokes are jokes about a person or group of people stranded on a desert island. The setting is typically used to play on expected or stereotypical behaviors of the people present.

The trope is also popular in cartoons. Bob Mankoff, cartoon editor of The New Yorker attributes the strips, which began appearing in the publication in the 1930s, to the popularity of Robinson Crusoe. He notes that earlier cartoons had a larger island, with a ship sinking in the distance as a hint to the context, and later cartoons merely showed one or two people on a tiny island with a single palm tree.

== Notable scenarios ==
The following old Jewish joke makes fun of Jewish congregational rivalry and splitting:

A Jew is rescued from a desert island after 20 years. The rescuers see his neat house and two beautiful synagogues. "Why two?" - they ask. - "In this synagogue I daven, and that one, I never step my foot in."

Folklorist Alan Dundes notes that a desert island joke is a conventional setting for what he calls "international slurs". (Note: Dundes asserts a broad (as he says, a "functional" i.e., based on the intention of the utterance) definition of [ethnic/international] slurs: "A slur may be a single word or phrase; it may be proverb, a riddle, or a joke".) (among other scenarios). In this scenario, marooned people of several ethnicities act according to their purported ethnic stereotypes:

Several people of various nationalities were marooned. The Americans went into businesses, the French built nightclubs, the Germans started an army... The Englishmen were not introduced to each other.

== See also ==
- "Assume a can opener" a catchphrase coming from a desert island joke
