= Lightbulb joke =

Jokes of the form "How many ___ does it take to change a lightbulb?"

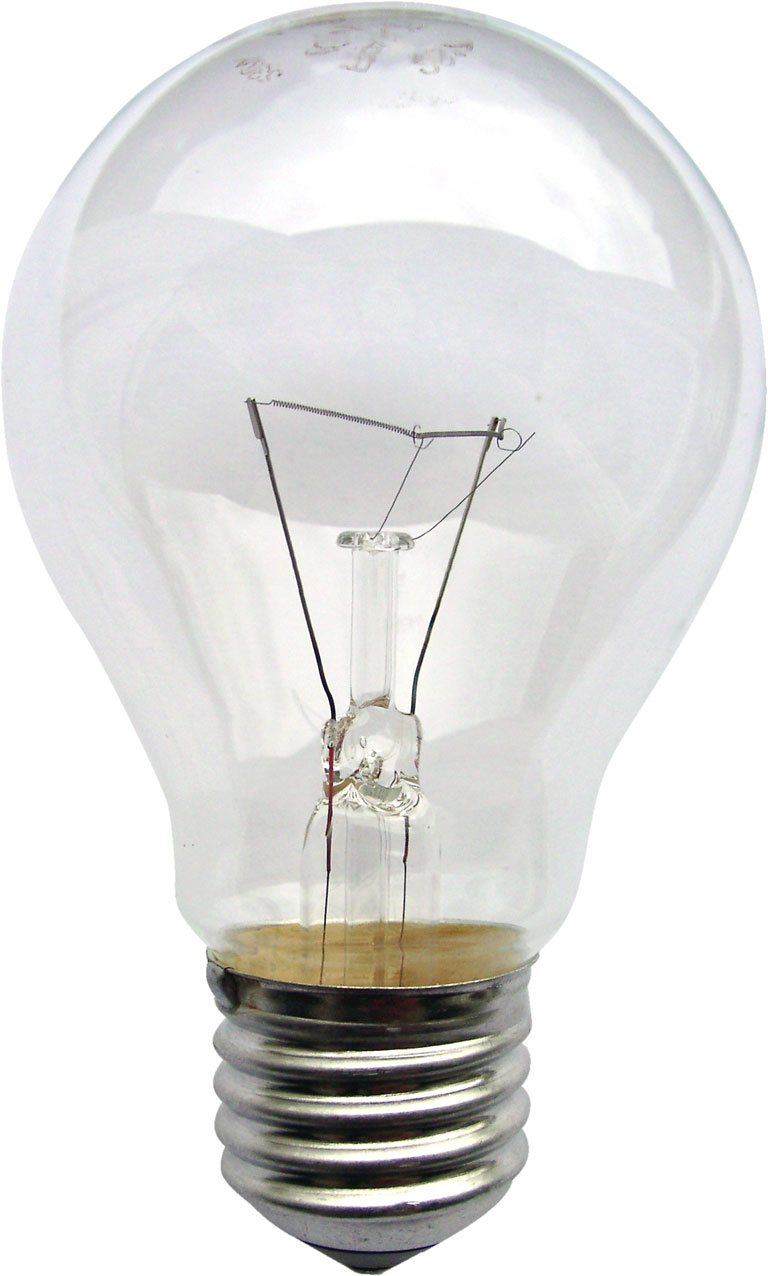
An Edison screw lightbulb can be screwed into the base without assistance

A lightbulb joke is a joke cycle that asks how many people of a certain group are needed to change, replace, or screw in a light bulb. Generally, the punch line answer highlights a stereotype of the target group. There are numerous versions of the lightbulb joke satirizing a wide range of cultures, beliefs, and occupations.

Early versions of the joke, popular in the late 1960s and the 1970s, were used to insult the intelligence of people, especially Poles ("Polish jokes"). Such jokes generally take the form of:

Q. How many [members of the target group] does it take to change a lightbulb?
A. Three — one to hold the light bulb and two to turn the ladder around.

Although lightbulb jokes tend to be derogatory in tone (e.g., "How many drunkards..." / "Four: one to hold the light bulb and three to drink until the room spins"), the people targeted by them may take pride in the stereotypes expressed and are often themselves the jokes' originators.

Lightbulb jokes applied to subgroups can be used to ease tensions between them.

== Variations ==
Some versions of the joke are puns on the words "change" or "screw".

Q. How many psychiatrists does it take to change a light bulb?
A. None—the light bulb will change when it's ready.

Q. How many flies does it take to screw in a lightbulb?
A. Two, but don't ask me how they got in there.

Lightbulb jokes are often responses to contemporary events. For example, the lightbulb may not need to be changed at all due to ongoing power outages.

The Village Voice held a $200 lightbulb joke contest around the time of the Iran hostage crisis, with the winning joke being:

Q. How many Iranians does it take to change a light bulb?
A. You send us the prize money and we'll tell you the answer.

== Notes ==
- Alan Dundes (1981). "Many Hands Make Light Work or Caught in the Act of Screwing in Light Bulbs". Western Folklore. 40 (3). Western States Folklore Society: 261–266. doi:10.2307/1499697. JSTOR 1499697.
- Alan Dundes (1981). "Many Hands Make Light Work or Caught in the Act of Screwing in Light Bulbs". In Joseph Boskin (1997). Humor prism in twentieth-century America. Wayne State University Press. pp. 250–7. ISBN 978-0-8143-2597-1.
- Judith B. Kerman (1980). "The Light-Bulb Jokes: Americans Look at Social Action Processes". The Journal of American Folklore. 93 (370). American Folklore Society: 454–458. doi:10.2307/539876. JSTOR 539876.
