= Redneck joke =

Joke series about rural, working-class Americans

A redneck joke is a joke about rednecks—working-class, rural, southern white Americans.

These jokes can be a form of classism, depending on the teller. Jeff Foxworthy is a comedian that specializes in telling redneck jokes. For example:

- "If you've ever cut your grass and found a car, you might be a redneck."
- "If you've ever been too drunk to fish, you might be a redneck."
- "If you've ever made change in the offering plate ... guilty ... you might be a redneck."
- "If you have no cars that are mobile and 14 cars that aren't, then you might be a redneck."

== See also ==
- Hillbilly
- Three Wolf Moon
- Blonde joke
