= Blonde joke =

Stereotype joke about blondes

- Alternative name: bailey
- Target of joke: Blonde women
- Language: English

Blonde jokes are a joke cycle based on a stereotype of a dumb blonde woman.

These jokes about people, generally women, who have blonde hair serve as a form of blonde versus brunette rivalry. They are often considered to be derogatory as many are mere variants on traditional ethnic jokes or jests about other identifiable groups that would be considered more offensive (such as Italian jokes involving Carabinieri).

In some cases, jokes about stereotypically stupid people have circulated since the seventeenth century with only the wording and targeted groups changed.

Some blonde jokes rely on sexual humour to portray or stereotype their subjects as promiscuous. Many of these are rephrased sorority girl or Essex girl jokes.

== Common traits ==
Blonde jokes nearly always take the format of the blonde placing herself in a situation or making a comment that serves to highlight her supposed promiscuity and/or lack of intelligence, cluelessness and clumsiness. The blonde of the joke is often placed in an unusual situation with a brunette or redhead.

The emergence of a class of meta-jokes about blondes ("meta-blonde jokes", i.e., jokes about blonde jokes) is noted. In a typical plot of this type a blonde complains about the unfairness of the stereotype propagated by blonde jokes, with a punch line actually reinforcing the stereotype. An example is about a blonde objecting to a ventriloquist act packed with sexist jokes about blondes:

Blonde: "I’ve heard enough of your stupid blonde jokes. What makes you think you can stereotype women that way? What does the color of a person’s hair have to do with her worth as a human being? It’s men like you that keep women like me from being respected at work and in the community and from reaching our full potential as a person. Because you and men like you continue to perpetuate discrimination against not only blondes, but women in general, and all in the name of humor!"

Ventriloquist: "I'm sorry ma'am but..."

Blonde: "You stay out of this, mister! I’m talking to that little idiot on your knee."

The British Essex girl joke, very similar in content, became popular in the late 1980s; it satirises working-class girls from the county of Essex.

== Criticism ==
Like all humour based on stereotypes, blonde jokes are considered offensive to many people, particularly blonde women.

Blonde jokes have been criticized as sexist by several authors, largely because the target is invariably dimwitted, female and sexually promiscuous.

== See also ==
- Blonde stereotype
- Dumb blonde
- Gender inequality and gender discrimination
- Redneck joke
