= Newfie =

Slang term for someone from Newfoundland

Newfie (also Newf or sometimes Newfy) is a colloquial term used by Canadians and others for someone who is from Newfoundland. Many Newfoundlanders consider "Newfie" a slur first used by American and Canadian military forces stationed on the island. It is also the shortened name of the Newfoundland dog breed. The term is also associated with jokes from the mid-to-late 20th century that depicted "Newfies" as foolish, leading to a belief in the derogatory nature of the term.

== Usage ==
During the Second World War, sailors on convoy duty nicknamed St. John's Newfiejohn.

The first edition of the Gage Canadian Dictionary, published in 1983, and the second edition of the Random House Unabridged Dictionary, published in 1987, both include usage notes describing the term 'Newfie' as offensive. However, neither the second edition of the Canadian Oxford Dictionary, published in 2004, nor the current edition of the Dictionary of Newfoundland English, published in 1998, make such a mention.

In March 2006, an Edmonton police officer was disciplined for using the word Newphie [sic] to describe the apprehension of an individual under the Mental Health Act.

== See also ==
- Newfie Bullet, an ironic nickname created by U.S. military personnel serving at bases in Newfoundland during the Second World War for a notoriously slow passenger train operated on the island.
- Newfie Screech, a type of rum bottled in Newfoundland.
- Okie
