= Christie Davies =

British sociologist, criminologist and author

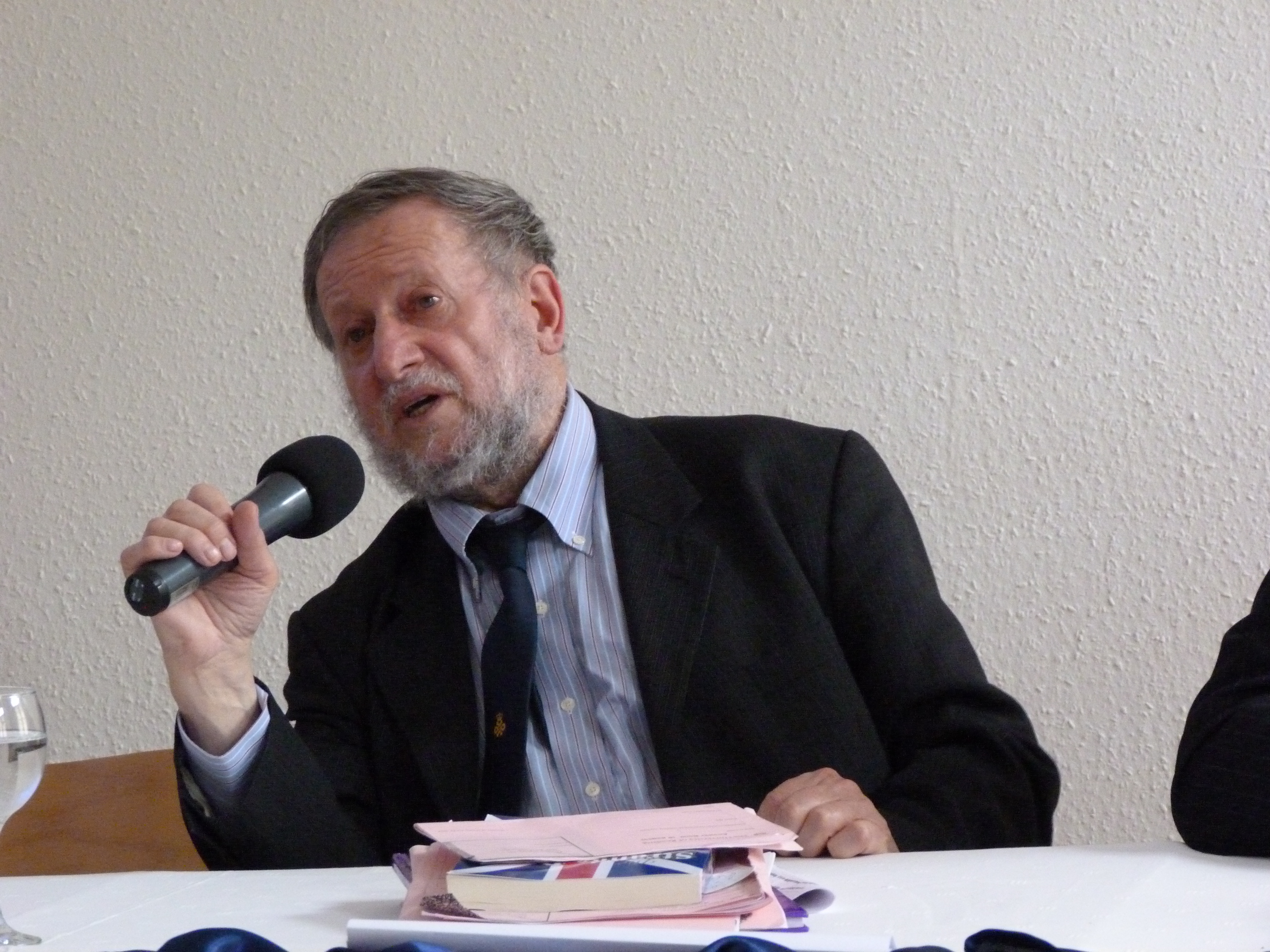
- Christie Davies – 2014
- Born: John Christopher Hughes Davies; 25 December 1941; Cheam, Surrey
- Died: 26 August 2017 (aged 75)
- Occupations: Academic, Sociologist, Author
- Spouse: Jan

Academic background
- Education: Emmanuel College, Cambridge

Academic work
- Notable works: Ethnic Humor Around the World: a Comparative Analysis; Jokes and their Relation to Society; The Mirth of Nations

John Christopher Hughes "Christie" Davies (25 December 1941 – 26 August 2017) was a British sociologist, professor emeritus of sociology at the University of Reading, England, the author of many articles and books on criminology, the sociology of morality, censorship, and humour. He was also a visiting professor in India, Poland, United States, and Australia.

== Early life ==
He was born John Christopher Hughes Davies in Cheam, Surrey. His parents were Welsh, his father an inspector of schools and mother a teacher. He attended secondary school at Dynevor School in Swansea, Wales. He then studied at Emmanuel College, Cambridge (taking part alongside Germaine Greer, Clive James and Eric Idle in the Cambridge Footlights) and graduated with a double first in Economics. In later life, Davies received a PhD from the same university (Cambridge) based on his published works.

== Career ==
In 1964, Davies taught economics at the University of Adelaide, South Australia. After coming back to the UK, he spent two years at the BBC as a radio producer. He then returned to the academia, lecturing at the University of Leeds for three years, followed by a stint as a visiting lecturer in India. In 1972 he joined the University of Reading as a lecturer in sociology, receiving promotion to a professor in 1984. In 2002 he retired and was appointed professor emeritus at the same university.

In addition to numerous works on humour, censorship and morality, Davies also published a collection of humorous fantasy stories titled Dewi the Dragon.

== Humour research ==
In his 2002 book The Mirth of Nations, Davies criticised the theories which derive humor from conflict and superiority, and argued instead that humor is a form of play – a play with aggression, superiority, and taboo-breaking. He also argued against the Freudian theory about Jewish jokes being mostly self-deprecating, claiming that instead they are based on the cultural tradition of analytical thinking and self-awareness. American folklorist Alan Dundes called the book "the provocative critique of previous scholarship on the subject". In his book Jokes and Targets, he defends what are now considered politically incorrect jokes or even hate speech, claiming that: “Those in a free society who seek to restrain individuals from sharing jokes of which they disapprove are as misguided and intrusive as their Soviet counterparts and about as likely to succeed.”

Davies was past president of the International Society for Humor Studies.

== Resettling Hong Kong inhabitants in Northern Ireland ==
In 1983, Davies warned that when Britain handed Hong Kong back to China in 1997 there would be no future for its 5.5 million inhabitants. He jokingly suggested a new "city state" could be created near Magilligan Point in between Coleraine and Derry for resettling Hong Kong inhabitants. Files from The National Archives show that the idea triggered some debate among Whitehall mandarins. David Snoxell, a retired diplomat who took part in the debates revealed it was "a spoof between colleagues who had a sense of humour".

== Books ==
- 1973: Wrongful Imprisonment
- 1973: The Reactionary Joke Book, ISBN 0-7234-0494-1
- 1975: Permissive Britain: Social change in the Sixties and Seventies
- 1978: Censorship and Obscenity
- 1990, 1996: Ethnic Humor Around the World: a Comparative Analysis, ISBN 0-253-21081-X
- 1998: Jokes and their Relation to Society
- 1998: The Corporation under Siege
- 2002: The Mirth of Nations, ISBN 0-7658-0096-9; a social and historical study of jokes told in the English-speaking countries, based on archives and other primary sources, including old and rare joke books.
- 2003: (with Goh Abe) Esuniku Joku, Kodansha; the title is a gairaigo for "Ethnic joke"
- 2005: Jokes and groups. Monograph Series, 44. Institute for Cultural Research, London, ISBN 0-904674-39-8
- 2005, Dewi the Dragon, a collection of humorous fantasy stories
- 2006: The Strange Death of Moral Britain
- 2011: Jokes and Targets, Indiana University Press, ISBN 0-253-22302-4
