= Bellman joke =

Swedish joke cycle about a person named Bellman

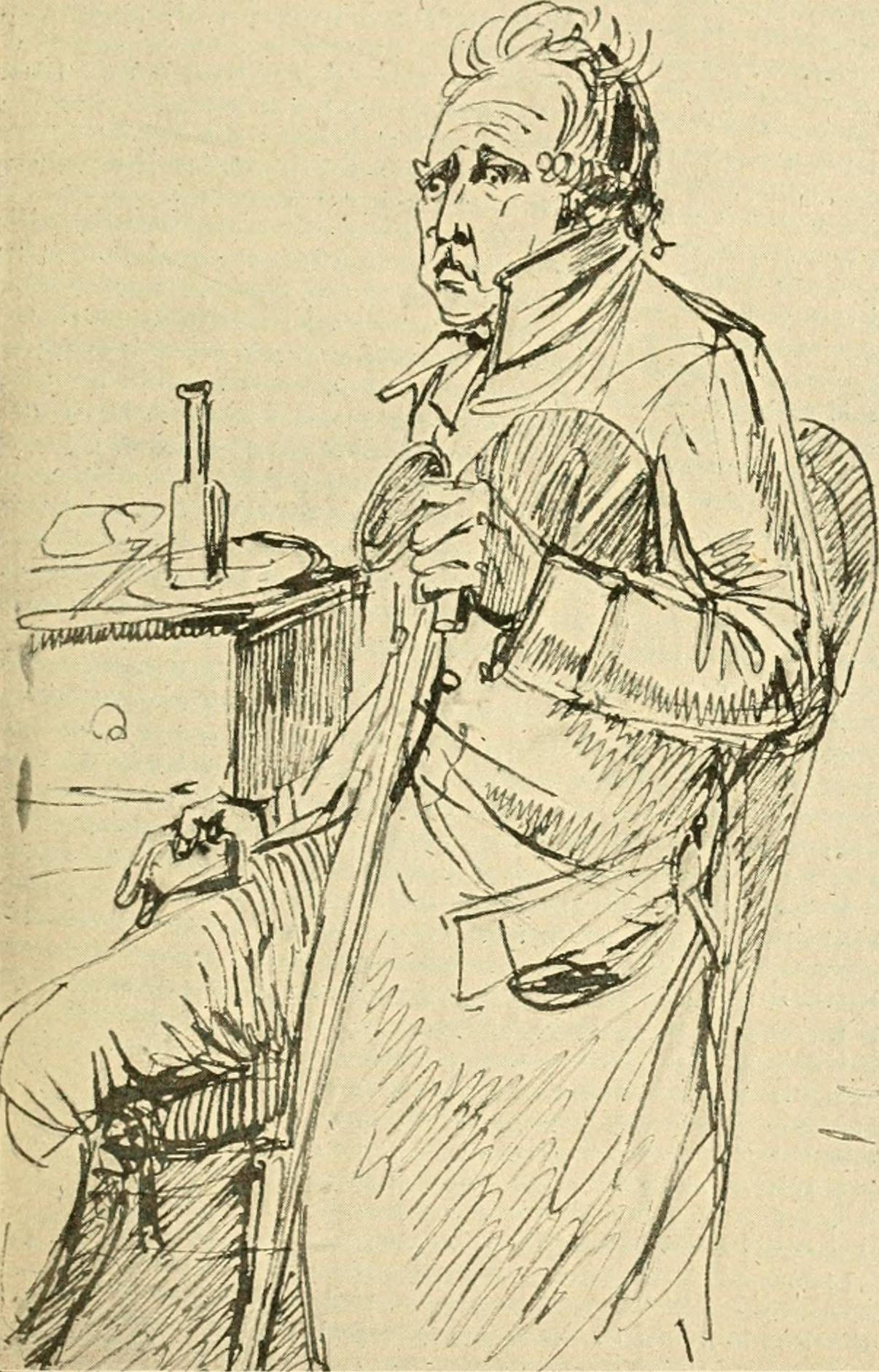
Sketch depicting Carl Mikael Bellman by contemporary artist Johan Tobias Sergel

The Bellman joke is a type of simple joke cycle popular among Swedish schoolchildren, always including a person named Bellman as the main character.

The jokes first became popular in the 19th century, and were originally inspired by the life of the poet and composer Carl Michael Bellman. The first known Bellman joke appears in the preface to an 1835 collection of Bellman's works, in which the publisher reprints an 1808 letter from a contemporary of Bellman, containing the following anecdote.

[Bellman] rarely owned more than one coat. Once when King Gustav met him in the street he was wearing no more than a nightdress, at which the King said: "But my dear Bellman, you look so ill-clad," to which he bowed and replied, "I humbly assure your Majesty that I have the whole of my wardrobe on me."

Nineteenth-century Bellman jokes tended to focus on C. M. Bellman's life at court, and often contained sexual humour. Since then, however, the Bellman character of the jokes has changed into a generic Swede, rather than the historical figure. The shift from jokes told by adults to jokes told mainly by young schoolchildren up to 10 years of age probably happened in the first half of the 20th century.

The modern versions of the Bellman jokes often include Bellman and two other characters of different nationalities, with the former coming out victorious from a tricky situation. However, in many Bellman jokes, Bellman is portrayed as something of an anti-hero, who may cheat, lie or even smell very bad in order to get the last laugh. Another common theme is that Bellman fools or makes fun of a priest, policeman or other authority figure. He can thus be seen as a modern sort of a trickster. The jokes tend to involve bodily functions such as urinating or defecating.

The ubiquitous character of the stories and the fact that they have been told in various forms for so many years have made them subject to study by ethnologists such as Bengt af Klintberg and researchers in children's culture.
