= Punch line =

Last part of a joke

A punch line (also punch-line or punchline) concludes a joke; it is intended to make people laugh. It is the third and final part of the typical joke structure. It follows the introductory framing of the joke and the narrative which sets up the punch line. For example, a certain bar joke has the framing of "A man walks into a bar...", the brief narrative of "he hurts his head", and the punch line of "It was an iron bar!"

In a broader sense, "punch line" can also refer to the unexpected and funny conclusion of any performance, situation or story.

== Etymology ==
The origin of the term is unknown. Even though the comedic formula using the classic "set-up, premise, punch line" format was well-established in Vaudeville by the beginning of the 20th century, the actual term "punch line" is first documented in the 1910s; the Merriam-Webster dictionary pegs the first use in 1916.

== Linguistic analysis ==
A linguistic interpretation of the mechanics of the punch line response is posited by Victor Raskin in his script-based semantic theory of humor. Humor is evoked when a trigger, contained in the punch line, causes the audience to abruptly shift its understanding of the story from the primary (or more obvious) interpretation to a secondary, opposing interpretation. "The punch line is the pivot on which the joke text turns as it signals the shift between the [semantic] scripts necessary to interpret [reinterpret] the joke text." To produce the humor in the verbal joke, the two interpretations (i.e., scripts) need to be both compatible with the joke text and opposite or incompatible with each other. Thomas R. Shultz, a psychologist, independently expands Raskin's linguistic theory to include "two stages of incongruity: perception and resolution". He explains that "incongruity alone is insufficient to account for the structure of humour. [...] Within this framework, humour appreciation is conceptualized as a biphasic sequence involving first the discovery of incongruity followed by a resolution of the incongruity." Resolution generates laughter.

=== Prosodic features ===
There are many folk theories of how people deliver punchlines, such as punchlines being louder and at a higher pitch than the speech preceding it, or a dramatic pause before the punchline is delivered. In laboratory settings, however, none of these changes are employed at a statistically significant level in the production of humorous narratives. Rather, the pitch and loudness of the punchline are comparable to those of the ending of any narrative, humorous or not.

=== Jokes without a punch line ===
Shaggy dog stories are long-winded anti-jokes in which the punch line is deliberately anticlimactic. The humor here lies in fooling the audience into expecting a typical joke with a punch line. Instead they listen and listen to nothing funny and end up themselves as the butt of the joke.

Another type of anti-joke is the nonsense joke, defined as having "a surprising or incongruous punch line", which provides either no resolution at all or only a partial, unsatisfactory resolution. One example of this is the no soap radio punch line: "Two elephants were taking a bath. One said, 'Please pass the soap.' The other replied, 'No soap, radio.'" Here the anticipated resolution to the joke is absent and the audience becomes the butt of the joke.

== Jab lines ==
A joke contains a single story with a single punch line at the end. In the analysis of longer humorous texts, an expanded model is needed to map the narratological structure. With this in mind, the general theory of verbal humor (GTVH) was expanded to include longer humorous texts together with jokes, using the GTVH narrative structure to categorize them. A new term "jab line" was introduced to designate humor within the body of a text, as opposed to the punch line, which is always placed at the end. The jab line is functionally identical to the punch line, except that it can be positioned anywhere within the text, not just at the end. "Jab and punch lines are semantically indistinguishable (...), but they differ at a narratological level." Additionally, "jab lines are humorous elements fully integrated in the narrative in which they appear (i.e., they do not disrupt the flow of the narrative, because they either are indispensable to the development of the 'plot' or of the text, or they are not antagonistic to it)".

Using the expanded narrative structure of the GTVH and this new terminology of jab lines, literature and humor researchers now have a single theoretical framework, with which they can analyze and map any kind of verbal humor, including novels, short stories, TV sitcoms, plays, movies as well as jokes.

== Three-part structure ==
Felicitous jokes are often formatted in a style called AAB, (referred to as an A-A-A' triad by Yves Lavandier in Writing Drama) where a joke is made up of a set of three, the first two of which share some common attribute, and the third represents a deviation from that attribute. Under these conditions, the third item in the set—the B—is the punchline.

Rozin gives the following example as exemplifying this structure:

A: Some men are about to be executed. The guard brings the first man forward, and the executioner asks if he has any last requests. He says no, and the executioner shouts, "Ready! Aim!" Suddenly the man yells, "Earthquake!" Everyone is startled and looks around. In all the confusion, the first man escapes.

A: The guard brings the second man forward, and the executioner asks if he has any last requests. He says no, and the executioner shouts, "Ready! Aim!" Suddenly the man yells, "Tornado!" In the confusion, the second man escapes.

B: By now the last man has it all figured out. The guard brings him forward, and the executioner asks if he has any last requests. He says no, and the executioner shouts, "Ready! Aim!" and the last man yells, "Fire!"

According to this theory, the punchline is always the deviation, and it does not matter how many instances of A occur for there to be a punchline. However, jokes following the AAB structure are consistently rated as being funnier than their AB or AAAB counterparts. A classic example of the format in the United Kingdom is the Englishman, Irishman and Scotsman joke.

Jokes with a three-part structure follow the writing principle of the "rule of three".

== See also ==
- One-line joke
