= Ethnic joke =

Joke based on assumptions about a specific ethnic group

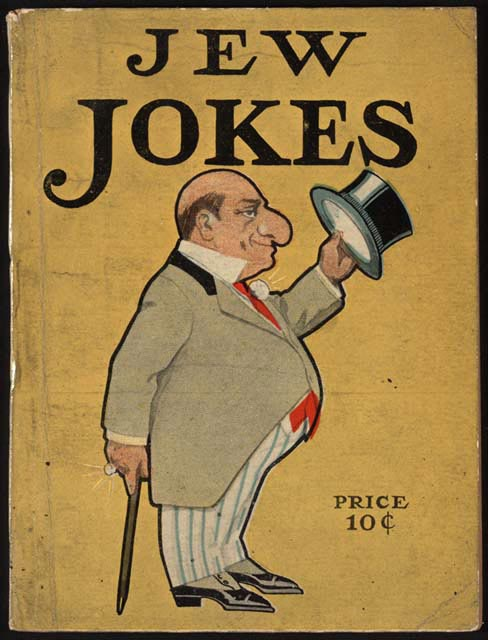
Book of jokes about Jews published in the United States in 1908

An ethnic joke is a remark aiming at humor relating to an ethnic, racial or cultural group, often referring to an ethnic stereotype of the group in question for its punchline.

Perceptions of ethnic jokes are ambivalent. Christie Davies gives examples that, while many find them racist and offensive, for some people jokes poking fun at one's own ethnicity may be considered acceptable. He points out that ethnic jokes are often found funny exactly for the same reason they sound racist for others; it happens when they play on negative ethnic stereotypes. Davies maintains that ethnic jokes reinforce ethnic stereotypes and sometimes lead to calls for violence. The perceived damage to the ethnic group can be of great concern as when the ethnic Polish jokes became so common in the 1970s, the Polish Ministry of Foreign Affairs approached the U.S. State Department to complain.

== Academic theories of ethnic humor ==
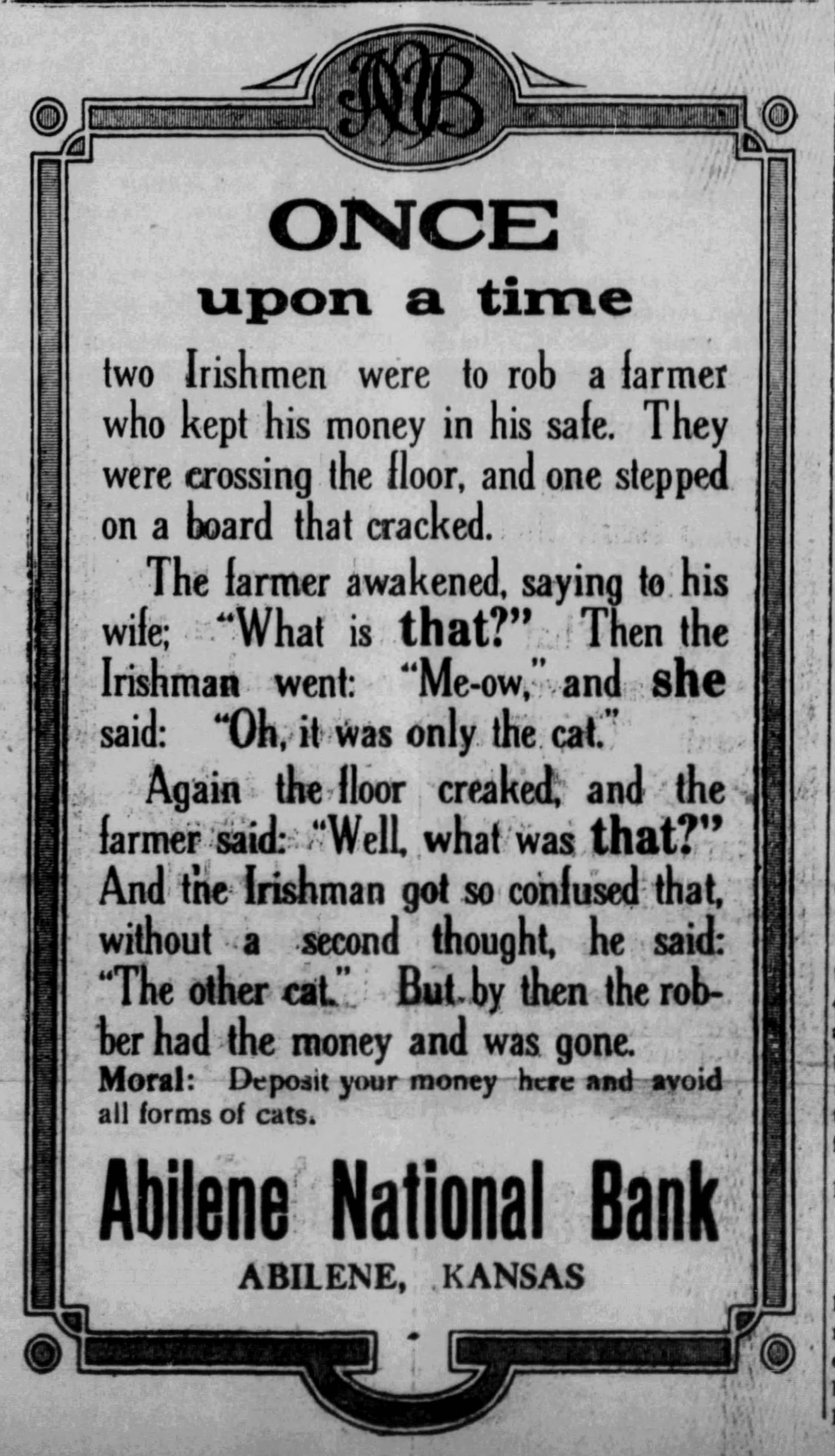
Irish joke in Abiline National Bank ad (1914)

The predominant and most widely known theory of ethnic humor attempts to discover social regularities in the anecdote traditions of different countries by contextually describing jokes. Christie Davies, author of this theory, has posed the main arguments in his article Ethnic Jokes, Moral Values and Social Boundaries, published in 1982. His approach is based on Victor Raskin's (1985) Semantic Script Theory of Humor, or to be more precise, on the arguments connected with ethnic humor on binary oppositions. While Raskin merely describes the main binary oppositions providing examples (mostly from Jewish humor), Davies explores the situations where the scripts apply; for example, he has discovered that the most common opposition, stupid/clever, is applied under particular circumstances in the social reality of two ethnic groups concerned.

Davies in his monograph published in 1990 has surmised that "Jokes in every country (or reasonably homogeneous cultural and linguistic domain) have certain targets for stupidity jokes – people who dwell on the edge of that nation or domain and who are perceived as culturally ambiguous by the dominant people of the center. In addition, they will likely be rustic people or immigrants in search of unskilled and low-prestige manual work. They are to a great extent similar to the joke-tellers themselves, share the same cultural background or even speak a similar or identical language." According to Davies, ethnic jokes are centered on the three main themes of stupidity, canniness and sexual behavior.

Davies is featured in the 2010 documentary film, Polack, exploring the source of the Polish joke.

L Perry Curtis, in examining ethnic humour aimed at the Irish in Victorian England, describes the descent that the ethnic joke and the accompanying stereotype can undergo as the target that they are aimed at descends into depictions of violent behaviour: "My curiosity of 'Paddy's' transformation in comic art from a rather primitive, rustic, or simple-minded peasant to a degenerate man ... bent on murder or outrage."

According to Samuel Schmidt, ethnic jokes can also be a form of social resistance, and so they are addressed by the joke-tellers against those whom they see as the aggressors, like the multiple jokes published in Mexico about Americans (also called gringos there).

== See also ==
- Allport's Scale
- Sa'idi joke
- An Englishman, an Irishman and a Scotsman
- Dialect comedy
- Ethnic stereotype
- Joking relationship
- Town of fools
