= List of humor research publications =

List of books, journals, and major publications of humor research

This article lists publications in humor research, with brief annotations. The list includes books and scholarly journals that regularly cover articles in humor research.

This list is not intended for humorous books and joke collections that do not have any scholarly analysis of humor.

== Early publications ==
- Henri Bergson: his 1900 book of three essays, Laughter, was written in French; its original title is Le Rire. Essai sur la signification du comique ("Laughter, an essay on the meaning of the comic").
- Sigmund Freud: his 1905 book on jokes and unconscious has been translated in many languages, including several translations in English
  - Jokes and Their Relation to the Unconscious, Translated by James Strachey, 1963, W. W. Norton & Company, ISBN 0-393-00145-8
  - The Joke and Its Relation to the Unconscious, Translated by Joyce Crick
    - 2002, Penguin, ISBN 0-14-118554-6
    - 2003, Penguin Classics, ISBN 0-14-243744-1
- Max Eastman
  - The Sense of Humor, New York: Scribners, 1921
  - The Enjoyment of Laughter, New York: Simon and Schuster, 1936

== Monographs ==
- Dramlitsch, Thomas, The Origin of Humor, 2018, ISBN 978-1720264637
- Minchew, Sue S.; Hopper, Peggy F. Clearing House, May/June 2008, Vol. 81 Issue 5, p232-236, 5p; (AN 32193154)
- Igor Krichtafovitch, Humor Theory. The formulae of laughter. Outskitspress, 2006, ISBN 978-1-59800-222-5
- Bruce Friend Adams (2005) Tiny Revolutions in Russia: Twentieth Century Soviet and Russian History in anecdotes, Routledge, ISBN 0-415-35173-1
- Alexander, Richard J (1997) Aspects of Verbal Humour in English
- Apte, M. L. (1985). Humor and Laughter: An Anthropological Approach. Ithaca: Cornell University Press, ISBN 0-8014-9307-2
- Salvatore Attardo
  - (1994) Linguistic Theories of Humor, Walter de Gruyter, ISBN 3-11-014255-4
  - (2001) Humorous Texts: A Semantic and Pragmatic Analysis, Walter de Gruyter, ISBN 3-11-017068-X
    - In this book Attardo finalizes the general theory of verbal humour (GTVH) suggested by him and Victor Raskin in 1991, known for some time under the name of semantic script theory of humour (SSTH)
  - (2023) Humor 2.0: How the Internet Changed Humor. Anthem Press.
- Arthur Asa Berger
  - An Anatomy of Humor, 1993, Transaction Publishers, ISBN 0-7658-0494-8
  - Blind Men and Elephants: Perspectives on Humor, 1995, Transaction Publishers
  - The Art of Comedy Writing, 1997, Transaction Publishers, ISBN 1-56000-324-3
- Peter L. Berger (1997) Redeeming Laughter: The Comic Dimension of Human Experience, Walter de Gruyter, ISBN 3-11-015562-1
- Francis H. Buckley (2003) The Morality of Laughter, University of Michigan Press, ISBN 0-472-09818-7
- Delia Chiaro (1992) The Language of Jokes: Analysing Verbal Play, Routledge, ISBN 0-415-03090-0
- Cohen, Sarah Blacher (ed) (1992) Comic Relief: Humor in Contemporary American Literature, Detroit: Wayne State University Press
- Lisa Colletta (2003) Dark Humor and Social Satire in the Modern British Novel, Palgrave Macmillan, ISBN 1-4039-6365-7
- Cohen, Ted (1999) Jokes: Philosophical Thoughts on Joking Matters, University of Chicago Press, ISBN 0-226-11230-6
- Critchley, Simon (2002) On Humour, Routledge, ISBN 0-415-25121-4
- Christie Davies (1998) Jokes and Their Relation to Society, Walter de Gruyter, ISBN 3-11-016104-4
- Jessica Milner Davis (2002) Farce, Transaction Publishers, ISBN 0-7658-0887-0
- Arthur Roy Eckardt (1995) How to Tell God from the Devil: On the Way to Comedy, Transaction Publishers, ISBN 1-56000-179-8
- Evan Esar (2006) The Humor of Humor: The Art And Techniques of Popular Comedy, Transaction Publishers, ISBN 1-4128-0616-X
- Marc Galanter (2005) Lowering the Bar: Lawyer Jokes and Legal Culture, University of Wisconsin Press, ISBN 0-299-21350-1
- Gantar, Jure (2005) The Pleasure of Fools: Essays in the Ethics of Laughter, McGill-Queen's Press, ISBN 0-7735-2892-X
- Ingvild Saelid Gilhus (1997) Laughing Gods, Weeping Virgins: Laughter in the History of Religion, Routledge, ISBN 0-415-16197-5
- Rupert D. V. Glasgow (1995) Madness, Masks, and Laughter: An Essay on Comedy, Fairleigh Dickinson University Press, ISBN 0-8386-3559-8
- J. C. Gregory (1999) The Nature of Laughter, Routledge, ISBN 0-415-21129-8
- Charles R. Gruner
  - Understanding Laughter: The workings of Wit and Humor, Chicago: Nelson Hall
  - (1999) The Game of Humor: A Comprehensive Theory of Why We Laugh, Transaction Publishers, ISBN 0-7658-0659-2
- Hempelmann, Christian F. (2010) Incongruity and Resolution of Medieval Humorous Narratives, VDM Verlag Dr. Müller, ISBN 3-639-22342-X
- Carl Hill (1993) The Soul of Wit: Joke Theory from Grimm to Freud, U of Nebraska Press, ISBN 0-8032-2369-2
- Jan Hokenson (2006) The Idea of Comedy: History, Theory, Critique, Fairleigh Dickinson University Press, ISBN 0-8386-4096-6
- Holland, N. (1982) Laughing: A psychology of humor, Cornell University Press
- M. Conrad Hyers (1996) The Spirituality of Comedy: Comic Heroism in a Tragic World, Transaction Publishers, ISBN 1-56000-218-2
- Koller, M.R. (1988) Humor and society: Explorations in the sociology of humor, Houston: Cap and Gown
- Robert L. Latta (1999) The Basic Humor Process: A Cognitive-Shift Theory and the Case against Incongruity, Walter de Gruyter, ISBN 3-11-016103-6 (Humor Research no. 5)
- Gershon Legman, Rationale of the Dirty Joke
- Paul Lewis
  - Cracking Up: American Humor in a Time of Conflict, The University of Chicago Press, 2006. ISBN 0-226-47699-5
  - Comic Effects: Interdisciplinary Approaches to Humor in Literature, State University of New York Press, 1989.
- John Marmysz (2003) Laughing at Nothing: Humor As a Response to Nihilism, SUNY Press, ISBN 0-7914-5839-3
- Rod A. Martin (2007) The Psychology of Humor: An Integrative Approach, Elsevier, ISBN 0-12-372564-X
- James Mendrinos (2004) The Complete Idiot's Guide to Comedy Writing, Alpha Books, ISBN 1-59257-231-6
- John Morreall
  - (1983) Taking Laughter Seriously, SUNY Press, ISBN 0-87395-642-7
  - (1999) Comedy, Tragedy, and Religion, SUNY Press, ISBN 0-7914-4205-5
- Dianna C. Niebylski (2004) Humoring resistance: laughter and the excessive body in contemporary Latin American women's fiction, SUNY Press, ISBN 0-7914-6123-8
- Neal R. Norrick (1993) Conversational Joking, Indiana University Press, ISBN 0-253-34111-6
- Dallin D. Oaks (2010) Structural Ambiguity in English: An Applied Grammatical Inventory, 2 vols. London: Continuum.
- Elliott Oring
  - (1992) Jokes and Their Relations, University Press of Kentucky, ISBN 0-8131-1774-7
  - (2003) Engaging Humor, University of Illinois Press, ISBN 0-252-02786-8
- Jerry Palmer (1994) Taking Humour Seriously, Routledge, ISBN 0-415-10266-9
- Robert R. Provine (2000) Laughter. A Scientific Investigation. Viking.
- Leon Rappoport (2005) Punchlines: The Case for Racial, Ethnic, and Gender Humor, Praeger/Greenwood, ISBN 0-275-98764-7
- Raskin, V. (1985) Semantic Mechanisms of Humor. Dordrecht: D. Reidel Pub. Co.
- Mary Ann Rishel (2002) Writing Humor: Creativity and the Comic Mind, Wayne State University Press, ISBN 0-8143-2960-8
- Graeme D. Ritchie (2004) The Linguistic Analysis of Jokes, Routledge, ISBN 0-415-30983-2
- Roukes, Nicholas (2003) Artful Jesters: Innovators of Visual Wit and Humor, Ten Speed Press,ISBN 1-58008-266-1
- Allan J. Ryan (1999) The Trickster Shift: Humour and Irony in Contemporary Native Art, UBC Press, ISBN 0-7748-0704-0
- Alison Ross (1998) The Language of Humour, Routledge, ISBN 0-415-16912-7
- Willibald Ruch (1998) The Sense of Humor: Explorations of a Personality Characteristic, Walter de Gruyter, ISBN 3-11-016207-5
- Barry Sanders (1995) Sudden Glory: Laughter as Subversive History, Beacon Press, ISBN 0-8070-6205-7
- Scott Cutler Shershow (1986) Laughing Matters: The Paradox of Comedy, University of Massachusetts Press, ISBN 0-87023-509-5
- Warren Shibles (1998) Humor Reference Guide: A Comprehensive Classification and Analysis, ISBN 0-8093-2097-5
- Paul Simpson (2003) On the Discourse of Satire: Towards a Stylistic Model of Satirical Humor, John Benjamins Publishing Company, ISBN 90-272-3333-0
- Andrew Stott (2005) Comedy, Routledge, ISBN 0-415-29933-0
- Westwood, R.I. and Rhodes, C. (eds.) (2007) Humour, Work and Organisation. Routledge, ISBN 978-0-415-38412-4
- Wickberg, Daniel (1998) The Senses of Humor: Self and Laughter in Modern America, Cornell University Press, ISBN 978-0-801-43078-7
- Dean L. Yarwood (2004) When Congress Makes a Joke: Congressional Humor Then and Now, Rowman & Littlefield, ISBN 0-7425-3043-4
- Barreca, Regina
  - They Used to Call Me Snow White...But I Drifted, 1991, Penguin ISBN 0-14-016835-4
  - Untamed and Unabashed: Essays on Women and Humor in British Literature, 1994, Wayne State University Press ISBN 0-8143-2136-4
  - Editor Last Laughs: Perspectives on Women and Comedy, 1988, Gordon and Breach ISBN 0-677-22020-0
  - Editor The Signet Book of American Humor, 2004, New American Library ISBN 0-451-21058-1
  - Editor The penguin Book of Women's Humor, 1996, Penguin ISBN 0-14-017294-7

=== Applications of humor ===
- Ronald A. Berk
  - (2002) Humor as an Instructional Defibrillator: Evidence-Based Techniques in teaching and assessment, Stylus Publishing, LLC, ISBN 1-57922-063-0
  - (2003) Professors Are from Mars, Students Are from Snickers: How to Write and, Stylus Publishing, LLC, ISBN 1-57922-070-3
- Elcha Shain Buckman (1994) The Handbook of Humor: Clinical Applications in Psychotherapy, Krieger Publishing Company, ISBN 0-89464-369-X
- Rumena Bužarovska (2012) What's Funny: Theories of Humor Applied to the Short Story, Blesok, 2012, ISBN 978-9989-59-377-2
- Louis R. Franzina (2002) Kids Who Laugh: How to Develop Your Child's Sense of Humor, Square One Publishers, ISBN 0-7570-0008-8
- Amelia J. Klein (2003) Humor in Children's Lives: A Guidebook for Practitioners, Praeger/Greenwood, ISBN 0-89789-892-3
- Karen J. Kolberg, Diana Loomans (2002) The Laughing Classroom: Everyone's Guide to Teaching with Humor and Play, H J Kramer, ISBN 0-915811-99-5
- Herbert M. Lefcourt (2001) Humor: The Psychology of Living Buoyantly, Springer, ISBN 0-306-46407-1
- Lefcourt, H. M., & Martin, R. A. (1986). Humor and life stress: Antidote to adversity. New York: Springer/Verlag.
- Paul E. McGhee (1989) Humor and Children's Development: A Guide to Practical Applications, Haworth Press, ISBN 0-86656-681-3
- C. W. Metcalf, Roma Felible (1999) Lighten Up: Survival Skills for People Under Pressure, Basic Books, ISBN 0-201-62239-4
- David M. Jacobson (2018) 7 1/2 Habits To Help You Become More Humorous, Happier & Healthier Humor, Horizons Publishing, ISBN 9781543050981

=== History of comedy and humor ===
- Salvatore Attardo (2023) Humor 2.0: How the Internet Changed Humor Anthem Press, Hardcover ISBN 978-1-83998-856-1 ebook ISBN 978-1-83998-857-8
- Salvatore Attardo, ed. (2014). Encyclopedia of Humor Studies. SAGE Publications, Inc. ISBN 978-1-4129-9909-0.
- R. Howard Bloch (1986) The Scandal of the Fabliaux, University of Chicago Press, ISBN 0-226-05975-8
- Pamela Allen Brown (2003) Better a Shrew Than a Sheep: Women, Drama, and the Culture of Jest in early modern England, Cornell University Press, ISBN 0-8014-8836-2, a review
- Chris Holcomb (2001) Mirth Making: The Rhetorical Discourse on Jesting in early modern England, U of South Carolina Press, ISBN 1-57003-397-8
- Levy, Brian Joseph (March 2002). "a review".
- Laurie O'Higgins (2003) Women and Humor in Classical Greece, Cambridge University Press, ISBN 0-521-82253-X
- Lisa Renée Perfetti (2003) Women and Laughter in Medieval Comic Literature, University of Michigan Press, ISBN 0-472-11321-6
- Manfred Pfister (2002) A History of English Laughter: Laughter from Beowulf to Beckett and Beyond, Rodopi, ISBN 90-420-1288-9
- Robson, James (2006) Humour, Obscenity and Aristophanes, Gunter Narr Verlag, ISBN 3-8233-6220-8
- Mary Jane Stearns Schenck (1987) Fabliaux - Tales of Wit and Deception, John Benjamins Publishing Company, ISBN 90-272-1734-3
- Michael West (2000) America's Romantic Punsters and the Search for the Language of Nature, Ohio University Press, ISBN 0-8214-1324-4
- Williams, Alison (March 2004). "a review".

=== Ethnic humor ===
- Christie Davies
  - (1990) Ethnic Humor Around the World: A Comparative Analysis, Indiana University Press, ISBN 0-253-31655-3
  - (2002) The Mirth of Nations, Transaction Publishers, ISBN 0-7658-0096-9
    - A social and historical study of jokes from the main English-speaking countries, which debates the existing theories of humor
- Emil A. Draitser (1998) Taking Penguins to the Movies: Ethnic Humor in Russia, Wayne State University Press, ISBN 0-8143-2327-8
- (in German) Karin Keding, Anika Struppert (2006) Ethno-comedy im deutschen Fernsehen: Inhaltsanalyse und Rezipientenbefragung zu "Was guckst du?!", Frank & Timme GmbH, ISBN 3-86596-084-7
- (in Portuguese) Adilson José Moreira (2018) O Que É Racismo Recreativo?, Editora Letramento, ISBN 9-788595-301313

==== Jewish comedy and humor ====
- Altman, Sig (1971) Comic Image of the Jew: explorations of a pop culture phenomenon, Fairleigh Dickinson University Press, ISBN 0-8386-7869-6
- Arthur Asa Berger (2006) The Genius of the Jewish Joke, Transaction Publishers, ISBN 1-4128-0553-8
- Cohen, Sarah Blacher (1991) Jewish Wry: Essays on Jewish Humor, Detroit: Wayne State University Press
- Elliott Oring (1981) Israeli Humor: The Content and Structure of the Chizbat of the Palmah, SUNY Press, ISBN 0-87395-512-9
- Richard Raskin (1992) Life Is Like a Glass of Tea. Studies of Classic Jewish Jokes. Aarhus University Press. ISBN 87-7288-409-6.
- Asscher Omri (2010) "A model for Hebrew translation of British humor: Amplification and overstatement", Target 22:2. John Benjamins Publishing Company.
- Avner Ziv (1998) Jewish Humor, Transaction Publishers, ISBN 1-56000-991-8
  - The book is derived from the First International Conference on Jewish Humor, Tel Aviv University.

=== Stand-up comedy ===
- Joanne R. Gilbert (2004) Performing Marginality: Humor, Gender, and Cultural Critique, Wayne State University Press, ISBN 0-8143-2803-2
- Hengen, Shannon Eileen (1998) Performing Gender and Comedy: Theories, Texts and Contexts, Routledge, ISBN 90-5699-540-5
- Suzanne Lavin (2004) Women and Comedy in Solo Performance: Phyllis Diller, Lily Tomlin, and Roseanne, Routledge, ISBN 0-415-94858-4
- John Limon (2000) Stand-Up Comedy in Theory, Or, Abjection in America, Duke University Press, ISBN 0-8223-2546-2
- Robert A. Stebbins (1990) The Laugh-Makers: Stand-up Comedy as Art, Business, and Life-Style, McGill-Queen's University Press, ISBN 9780773562325
- Rutter, Jason (1997). "Stand-up as interaction: Performance and Audience in Comedy Venues" (PDF). Department of Sociology. CORE. University of Saford: Institute for Social Research.

== Collections of scientific works on humor ==
- J.H. Goldstein and P.E. McGhee (Eds), The Psychology of Humor: Theoretical Perspectives and Empirical Issues, New York: Academic Press, 1972
- A.J. Chapman and H.C. Foot, (Eds.),
  - Humor and Laughter: Theory, Research and Applications,
    - London: John Wiley and Sons, 1976
    - Transaction Publishers. 1996.
  - It's a Funny Thing, Humour Oxford, England: Pergamon Press, 1977
- J. Bremmer and H. Roodenburg, (Eds.), A Cultural History of Humor, Malden, MA: Blackwell Publishers, 1997
- McGhee, P.E., and Goldstein, J.H. (Eds), Handbook of Humor Research, New York: Springer-Verlag, 1983
- "Humor and Society: Explorations in the Sociology of Humor." Houston. 1988.
- John Parkin (Ed.)(1999) French Humour: Papers Based on a Colloquium Held in the French Department of the University of Bristol, November 30, 1996, Rodopi, ISBN 90-420-0586-6
- Paton, G.E.C., Powell, C., Wagg, S. (Eds) The Social Faces of Humour: Practices and Issues, Aldershot, England: Arena
- Raskin, Victor. (Ed.) 2008. The Primer of Humor Research. Berlin, New York: Mouton de Gruyter.

Loizou, E. & Recchia, S.(Eds.) (2019). Research on Young Children's Humor: Theoretical and Practical Implications for Early Childhood Education. Switzerland: Springer

== Journals and book series ==
- Comedy Studies (journal)
- European Journal of Humour Research
- Humor (alias Humor: International Journal of Humor Research, International Journal of Humor Research)
- Humor & Health Journal (formerly Humor & Health Letters), a bimonthly by Humor & Health Institute
- Humor Research
- Israeli Journal of Humor Research : An international journal
- Studies in American Humor
- Symposium On Humor and the Law BYU Law Review, vol 1992, #2
