= Neal R. Norrick =

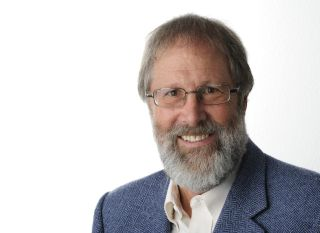
Neal R. Norrick

Neal R. Norrick is a German linguist. He held the chair of English linguistics at Saarland University in Saarbrücken, Germany, where he established a linguistics curriculum firmly based in pragmatics and discourse analysis. In the last two decades, he has become an important personality in linguistic pragmatics for his pioneering works on humor and narrative in conversational interaction.

He came to Saarbrücken from Northern Illinois University, where he was professor for linguistics and director of graduate studies in the Department of English. He has taught English linguistics at the universities of Würzburg, Kassel, Hamburg, Braunschweig and Regensburg, where he received his doctorate in general linguistics in 1978.

His research specializations in linguistics include conversational narrative, verbal humor, and tellability. He authored the first monograph dedicated to humor in conversation.

In recent years, Norrick has focused his research on spoken language, with particular interests in the role of the listener in conversational interaction. He continues to publish in the areas of pragmatics and narrative. Norrick acted as co-editor in chief of the Journal of Pragmatics, and serves on the consultation board of the International Pragmatics Association (IPrA). He is on the editorial boards of the journals Text & Talk, Humor: International Journal of Humor Research, International Review of Pragmatics, Discourse Processes, Lodz Papers in Pragmatics and Journal of Language Aggression and Conflict.
