= Cloudesley (disambiguation) =

Cloudesley is an 1830 novel by William Godwin.

Cloudesley may also refer to:

== People ==
- Cloudesley Brereton (1863–1937), British educationalist and writer
- M. A. Cloudesley Brereton (1872–1946), British feminist and sanitary reformer
- Cloudesley Dewar Bullock (C. D. B.) Marsham (1835–1915), English amateur cricketer
- Cloudesley Henry Bullock (C. H. B.) Marsham (1879–1928), English amateur cricketer, son of C. D. B.
- Cloudesley Varyl Robinson (1883–1959), British Royal Navy officer
- Cloudesley Brereton Sharpe (1904–1993), English first-class cricketer
- Cloudesley Shovell (1650–1707), English Royal Navy officer

== Places ==
- Cloudesley Square, a square in the Barnsbury district of Islington, North London

== See also ==
- John Cloudsley-Thompson (1921–2013), British naturalist
