= Boskin =

Boskin or Boškin is a surname. Notable people with the surname include:

- Angela Boškin (1885–1977), Slovenian nurse and social worker
- Edward J. Boskin, pseudonym of Edward Mylius (1878–1947), Belgian-born journalist jailed in England in for libel against King George V
- Joseph Boskin (fl. 1947), American historian
- Michael Boskin (born 1945), American historian

== See also ==
- Boskin Commission, formed in 1995 and chaired by Michael Boskin
