= The Two Sources of Morality and Religion =

- Author: Henri Bergson
- Translators: R. Ashley Audra and Cloudesley Brereton with the assistance of W. Horsfall Carter
- Language: English
- Subject: morality, religion, war, peace, democracy
- Publisher: Macmillan and Co.
- English publication date: 1935

The Two Sources of Morality and Religion (French: Les Deux Sources de la morale et de la religion) is the last major philosophical work by the French philosopher Henri Bergson and published in 1932. In this book, Bergson explores the origins of morality and religion and examines their role in human society. He argues that morality and religion arise from two different sources: one based on social obligation and the other on love, freedom, and spiritual inspiration. Through this distinction, he seeks to explain how human beings develop moral values and how religion influences both individual lives and collective communities.

Bergson distinguishes between closed morality and open morality, as well as between static religion and dynamic religion. Closed morality and static religion help maintain social order, preserve traditions, and strengthen the bonds within a community. Open morality and dynamic religion, by contrast, emerge through the inspiration of exceptional individuals, such as heroes, saints and mystics, whose love and spiritual vision encourage humanity to move beyond established rules and boundaries. Ultimately, Bergson presents a vision of human progress based on creativity, compassion, and universal love. His work remains significant because it invites readers to reflect on the relationship between social responsibility, religious experience, and the moral development of humanity.

== War and Peace ==
For Henri Bergson, closed morality is always concerned with war. Static religion, the religion of closed morality, is based on what Bergson calls the “myth-making function”. Open morality and dynamic religion, on the other hand, are concerned with creativity and progress. Rather than being primarily concerned with maintaining social cohesion within a particular group, open morality extends beyond the boundaries of the community to embrace all humanity. It is universal in scope and oriented towards peace. Its ideal is an open society.

== Democracy ==
Οf all political concepts, democracy is the furthest removed from nature, the only one that surpasses, at least in intensity, the conditions of the closed society, says Henri Bergson, yet a global democracy that embraces all human beings, in place of that which stopped at the borders of the city and which, even within the city itself, was limited to free people only. Not, therefore, the nonsense of Athenian democracy, but a global ideal, or rather a direction, upon the path of which we are to place humanity.
