= Theories of humor =

Conjectures explaining humor

Although humor is a phenomenon experienced by most humans, its exact nature is a topic of heavy debate. There are many theories of humor which attempt to explain what it is, what social functions it serves, and what would be considered humorous. Although various classical theories of humor and laughter may be found, in contemporary academic literature, three theories of humor appear repeatedly: relief theory, superiority theory, and incongruity theory. Among current humor researchers, there is yet no consensus about which of these three theories of humor is most valid, though the incongruity theory is the most predominant. Some proponents of each of these most commonly known theories originally claimed that theirs and theirs alone explained all humor. There is, however, consensus that these theories, especially incongruity, have been building blocks for some later ones. Many theorists also now hold that the three main theories are of narrower focus than originally intended, and that there are examples of humor where various theories explain different aspects. Similarly, one view holds that theories have a combinative effect; Jeroen Vandaele claims that incongruity and superiority theories describe complementary mechanisms that together create humor. Another such combinative view involves incongruity and relief, that Terry Eagleton considers in his 2019 book, Humour.

== Relief theory ==
Relief theory suggests humor is a mechanism for pent-up emotions or tension through emotional relief. In this theory, laughter serves as a homeostatic mechanism by which psychological stress is reduced. Humor may thus facilitate ease of the tension caused by one's fears, for example. Laughter and joy, according to relief theory, result from this release of excess nervous energy. According to relief theory, humor is used mainly to overcome sociocultural inhibitions and reveal suppressed desires. It is believed that this is why we laugh while being tickled, due to a buildup of tension as the tickler "strikes."

From the idea of humor being a release of tension, philosophers and researchers developed a relief theory, and a notion of comic relief over time.

In the eighteenth century, Samuel Johnson argued that relief theory was to be used as a dramatic tool, and fellow English drama theorist John Dryden (1668) believed mirth and tragedy would make for the best plots.

On the other hand, Shurcliff (1968) argued that humor is a mechanism to relieve tension. When in anticipation of a negative experience, one may begin to feel some heightened arousal. According to Shurcliff, the heightened arousal is then reduced through mirth or laughter. Comparably, an English Scholar, Lucas (1958), wrote that audiences respond better based on the "strain-rest-strain-rest" idea in which a tragic event may happen with moments of relaxation.

According to Herbert Spencer, laughter is an "economical phenomenon" whose function is to release "psychic energy" that had been wrongly mobilized by incorrect or false expectations. The latter point of view was supported also by Sigmund Freud. Immanuel Kant also emphasized the physiological release in our response to humor. Eddie Tafoya uses the idea of a physical urge tied to a psychological need for release when describing relief theory in his book The Legacy of the Wisecrack: Stand-up Comedy as the Great Literary Form. Tafoya explains "…that each human being is caught in a tug-of-war: part of us strains to live free as individuals, guided by bodily appetites and aggressive urges, while the other side yearns for conformity and acceptance. This results in every normal person being continually steeped in psychic tension, mostly due to guilt and lack of fulfillment. This tension can be relieved, albeit temporarily, through joking."

In Jokes and their Relation to the Unconscious, Freud made distinctions between tendentious and non-tendentious humor. Tendentious humor is that of a victim, someone whose shortcomings are used for humor. Non-tendentious humor is victimless. Although Freud determined tendentious elements pushed individuals to potential laugh attacks, innocuous elements were still essential. Hostility alone cannot be enjoyed because society deems it wrong. In society, one cannot laugh when told a story of tragedy. The only way it is accepted is if they are embellished with jokework. Freud argued that innocent jokework was a disguise for the hostility in humor. The elements of innocuous (innocent) features make such wordplay socially acceptable.

Zillmann and Bryant (1980) conducted a study to test Freud's claims and combine or separate non-tendentious and tendentious humor. The results confirmed their expectations. Amusement was high when 'good comedy' was presented. As predicted, participants laughed at instances of victimization and demise of the individuals. Zillman and Bryant proved Freud's finding to be accurate. Innocuous cues only amused to double in response to the misfortune.

== Superiority theory ==
The superiority theory of humor traces back to Thomas Hobbes's Leviathan. It is also very widely claimed to be associated with Plato and Aristotle. The general idea is that a person laughs about the misfortunes of others because they feel superior. There is a lack of consensus, however, as to exactly what the superiority theory means and the purpose of the claim it makes about humor. On the one hand, several academic specialists in humor (see below, criticism of superiority theory) emphasize that the theory means to define our response to humor itself in terms of feelings of superiority. Many journalists, however, and humor teachers such as Roxanna Elden, talk about the superiority theory as though it means the prescriptive, creative rule of using things in humor to which we may feel superior.

Plato described the laughable as being both a pleasure and pain in the soul. One may experience these mixed emotions during the malicious person's happiness at the victim's misfortune. For Aristotle, we laugh at inferior or ugly individuals. Aristotle observed that many jokes relied on a combination of incongruity and hostility. He explained that jokes are funny because they catch the listener off guard, introducing a surprising and unexpected twist that amuses them. However, this incongruity alone does not entirely explain the mechanics of laughter. There also appears to be a component of hostility from both the comedian and the audience. What makes something funny often involves ridiculous features, such as a physical deformity or a slip-up. Therefore, whether through jokes, situations, or physical characteristics, while humor's laughter-inducing quality primarily stems from incongruity, aggression is also intertwined with it.

In the 17th century, Thomas Hobbes described superiority theory in two pieces, Human Nature (1650) and Leviathan (1651), which have very similar views. Hobbes describes laughter as the sudden glory one feels that one is better than the target of the humorous narrative. The sense of glory comes from the recognition of power. Hobbes also mentions the theory of passion in which laughter is not passion; however, laughter is how the body manifests a particular emphasis. Hobbes proposed there are several which typically evoke this feeling of glory:

1. Success in one's actions beyond one's expectations.
2. The perception of infirmities and defects in others.
3. The perception of infirmities and defects in one's past.
4. The conception of some absurdity is abstracted from individual persons.

According to Hobbes, laughter evoked by these circumstances always has connections with the feeling of superiority.

While Kant is not usually recognized as a superiority theorist, there are elements of superiority theory in his account. Kant thinks that there is a place for harmless teasing. In addition, philosopher of humor Noël Carroll observes that even the structure of a narrative joke, on Kant's view, requires the joke teller to "take in" or outdo the joke receiver, even if only momentarily. Because such joking is recognized as joking and it is carried out in a playful way, it does not imply that the joker feels or thinks they are actually superior.

=== Criticisms of superiority theory ===
Philosophers, beginning with James Beattie in response to Thomas Hobbes, have objected that there are many types of humor that do not, in themselves, have anything to do with feelings of superiority (Beattie, 1778/79). More recently and broadly, it is argued that even in humor directly accompanied by feelings of superiority, those feelings are in fact always distinct from the humor itself and they are never identical with it (Morreall 1983, Levinson 2006, Marra 2019).

=== Affective disposition theory ===
Feelings of superiority in humor are examined closely in Zillmann and Cantor's affective disposition theory, which states that in media and entertainment, audiences make moral judgments, and the attitude (disposition) towards a person can affect the audience's experience of humor. Audiences enjoy the attempts of humor more when good things happen to good people and bad things happen to bad people. Thus, for good characters, good fortune is hoped, or tragedy is feared—while characters who are disliked are the complete opposite. If what the audience hopes for is achieved, then they may feel a sense of enjoyment or, in this case, humor. Similarly, audiences may find a comedian's jokes more humorous if they like the person delivering jokes.

However, when good things happen to people who deserve it, very little amusement is experienced by the audience. Thus, it is more beneficial to mirth in situations of misfortune rather than instances of fortune.

Disposition toward victim

1. The more intense the negative affective disposition toward the disparaged agent or entity, the greater the magnitude of mirth.
2. The more intense the positive affective disposition toward the disparaged agent or entity, the smaller the magnitude of mirth.

Disposition toward the victor

1. The more intense the negative affective disposition toward the disparaging agent or entity, the smaller the magnitude of mirth.
2. The more intense the positive affective disposition toward the disparaging agent or entity, the greater the magnitude of mirth.

These guidelines examine how amusement is expected when an extremely liked individual disparages an extremely disliked individual. On the other hand, one may experience less amusement when a disliked individual disparages the desired individual.

However, it is not in every instance of disparagement that humans experience mirth and laughter. In some cases, the comment or act of disparagement can be too much of a tragedy for such a reaction. Aristotle mentioned the emotions that come with instances of death, serious harm, or tragedy overpower laughter and instead evoke pity.

Superiority theory and disposition theory also play into the idea of punching up or punching down in comedy. Making jokes about someone who is superior to us is considered "punching up," while making jokes about someone who is inferior to us is considered "punching down". Due to these power imbalances, punching up is seen as ethical whereas punching down is the opposite.

Humor is complex, and different theories attempt to explain its various aspects. The disposition theory adds a psychological perspective by suggesting that individual differences play a crucial role in determining what people find funny.

== Incongruity theory ==
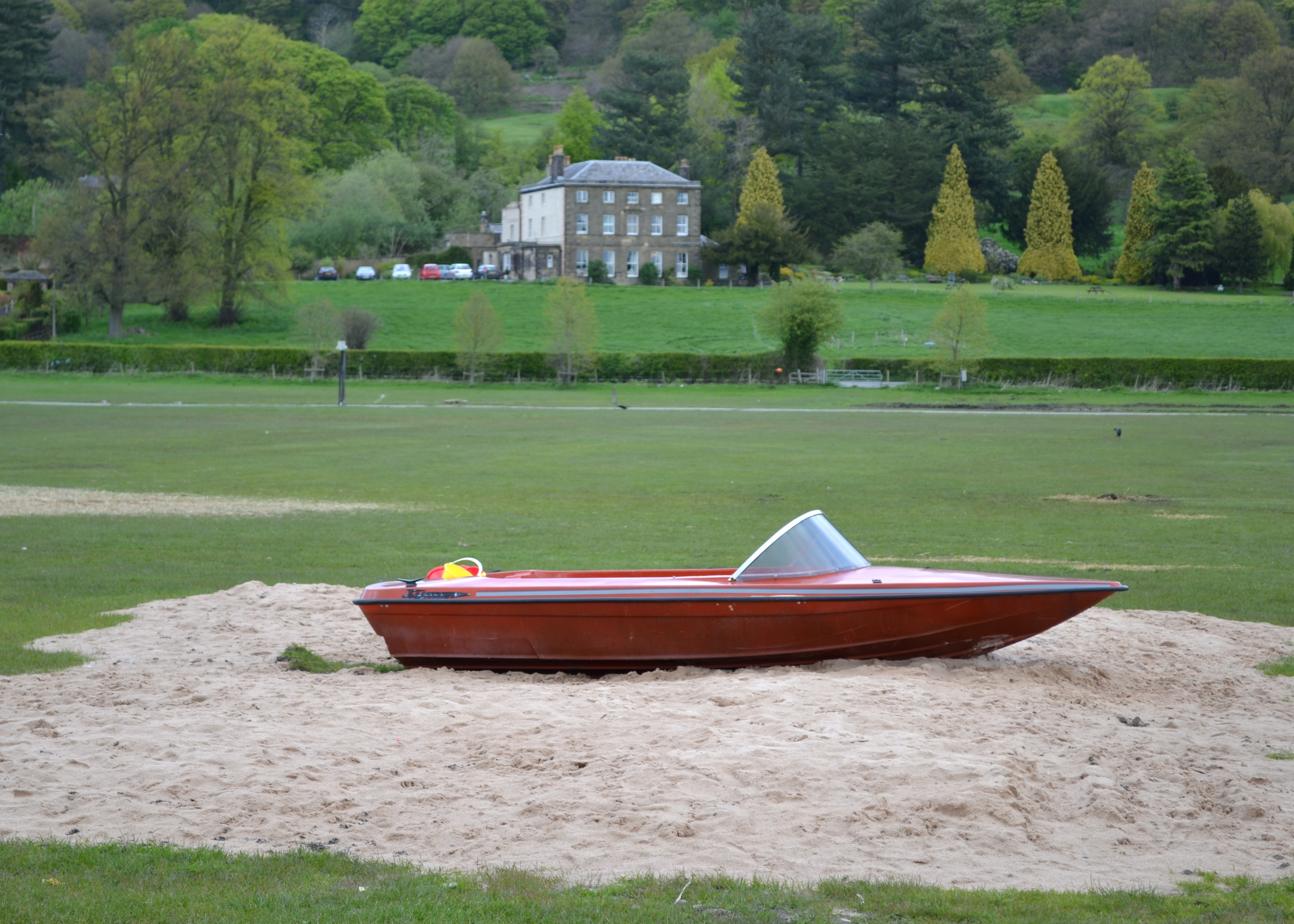
A boat placed incongruously in a field

Incongruity theory, otherwise known as incongruous juxtaposition theory, suggests that humor and laughter rely on incongruity, which denotes anything contrary to expectation according to some norm. One type of humor very often described by this theory is that of a play on words. Zillmann (2000) says that linguistic humor "requires the deciphering of ambiguities, a process that can be likened to problem-solving." For example, "What is black and white and re[a]d all over?" "A newspaper!" The part before the punchline can evoke puzzlement due to the cognitive dissonance of not anticipating the punchline. Subsequently, the punchline itself might puzzle the hearer until they see the resolution of incongruity, when humor is perceived.

Francis Hutcheson in Thoughts on Laughter (1725), used the term "contrast" rather than "incongruity." But he can be credited with the earliest modern form of the incongruity theory, less expansive than the contemporary yet a foundation of it. Hutcheson emphasized shifts and relationships between ideas of the grand or serious versus the lowly, sensual and so on, marking the transition away from the superiority theory to what is known as incongruity. In this early version, incongruity was mostly a singular clash between two opposing ideas. It can be compared to Aristotle's notion of ugliness, but is much broader. After Hutcheson thus initiated the incongruity theory, later thinkers developed it. Now a dominant version states that humor is perceived in the realization of incongruity between a concept involved in a certain situation and the real objects thought to be in some relation to the concept. In that explanation, which is from philosopher Arthur Schopenhauer, he meant by a "concept," in most cases, a word. Hence, he was referring to the type of joke cited above. It is primarily due to Schopenhauer's fame that his expression on this topic is granted such prominence.

Accordingly, such a version of this theory is not original to Schopenhauer, so much as to the Scottish poet James Beattie who wrote only fifty years after Hutcheson. Although not widely read today, historically, Beattie's presentation of the theory has, consequently, been very influential. He made the theory more universal, and instead of incongruity per se, emphasized its partial appropriateness by the idea of "assemblage." In turn, incongruity has been described as being resolved (i.e., by putting the objects in question into the real relation), and the incongruity theory is often called the incongruity-resolution theory (as well as incongruous juxtaposition).

A famous version of the incongruity theory is that of Immanuel Kant, who claimed that the comic is "the sudden transformation of a strained expectation into nothing." Kant explained laughter at humor as a response to an "absurdity." We first expect the world. Still, that expectation is then disappointed or "disappears into nothing." Our response to humor consists of a "play with thoughts." According to Kant, humor must involve the element of surprise. It creates a sense of cognitive dissonance and builds up tension, which is a pleasurable relief or laughter.

While Kant is an incongruity theorist, his account also has elements of release theory (emphasizing the physiological and physical aspects). It also evokes the superiority theory. He thought that teasing was acceptable as long as it occurred in the right setting and did not harm the person being teased.

Schopenhauer argued that humor results from the sudden recognition of an incongruity between the representation of an object and its actual nature. He also proposes the more unexpected incongruity, the more violent one's laughter will be. Georg Wilhelm Friedrich Hegel shared almost the same view but saw the concept as an "appearance" and believed that laughter negates that appearance.

Henri Bergson attempted to perfect incongruity by reducing it to the "living" and "mechanical." He proposed that comedy/humor lies in the portrayal of situations experiencing mechanical rigidity. Bergson emphasizes that humor involves an inappropriate relationship between habitual or mechanical behaviors and human intelligence. In Bergson's many types of combinations of the mechanical and the living, there is much similarity with the incongruity theory.

There has been some debate attempting to clarify the roles of juxtaposition and shifting in humor, hence, the discussion in the series Humor Research between John Morreall and Robert L. Latta (born 27 January 1945, not to be confused with Robert Latta). Though Morreall himself endorses a cognitive shift theory, in this particular dialogue he indicated examples of simultaneous contrast, while Latta emphasized the mental shift. Humor frequently contains an unexpected, often sudden, shift in perspective, which the incongruity theory assimilates. This has been defended by Latta (1998) and Brian Boyd (2004). Boyd views the shift from seriousness to play. Nearly anything can be the object of this perspective twist; it is, however, in the areas of human creativity (science and art being the varieties) that the shift results from "structure mapping" to create novel meanings. Arthur Koestler argues that humor results when two different frames of reference are set up and a collision is engineered between them.

== Benign violation theory ==
The benign violation theory (BVT) was developed by researchers Peter McGraw and Caleb Warren. Their ideas build on the work of Linguist Tom Veatch, who proposed that humor emerges when one's sense of how the world "ought to be" is threatened or violated. BVT claims that humor occurs when three conditions are satisfied:

1. Something threatens one's sense of how the world "ought to be."
2. The threatening situation seems benign.
3. A person sees both interpretations at the same time.

From an evolutionary perspective, humorous violations likely originated as apparent physical threats, like those present in play fighting and tickling. According to Benign violation, people often laugh when being tickled or play fighting because laughter signifies the situation is somehow threatening but safe. As humans evolved, the conditions that elicit humor likely expanded from physical threats to other violations, including violations of personal dignity (e.g., slapstick, teasing), linguistic norms (e.g., puns, malapropisms), social norms (e.g., strange behaviors, risqué jokes), and even moral norms (e.g., disrespectful behaviors).

There is also more than one way a violation can seem benign. McGraw and Warren tested three contexts in the domain of moral violations. A violation can seem benign if one norm suggests something is wrong, but another salient norm suggests it is acceptable. A violation can also seem benign when one is psychologically distant from the violation or is only weakly committed to the violated norm.

For example, McGraw and Warren find that most consumers were disgusted when they read about a church raffling off a Hummer SUV to recruit new members, but many were simultaneously amused. Consistent with BVT, people who attended church were less likely to be amused than people who did not. Churchgoers are more committed to the belief that churches are sacred and, consequently are less likely to consider the church's behavior benign.

One must have a slight connection to the norm that is being violated but, at the same time, cannot be too attached or committed. If a person is too attached, then there will be no humor. The violation will then not be considered benign. On the contrary, the violation will not be a moral norm if a person is not slightly attached. Thus, both of these must simultaneously be categorized as benign violations to emerge as humor.

The benign violation theory helps explain why some jokes or situations are funny to some people but not to others. It emphasizes the importance of context and individual differences in humor appreciation. A violation that one person finds amusing might be offensive or upsetting to another, and the perception of benignity plays a crucial role in determining the overall humor response.

== Other theories ==
=== Script-based semantic theory of humor ===
The script-based semantic theory of humor (SSTH) was introduced by Victor Raskin in "Semantic Mechanisms of Humor", published 1985. While being a variant on the more general concepts of the Incongruity theory of humor (see above), it is the first theory to identify its approach as exclusively linguistic. As such it concerns itself only with verbal humor: written and spoken words used in narrative or riddle jokes concluding with a punch line.

The linguistic scripts (a.k.a. frames) referenced in the title include, for any given word, a "large chunk of semantic information surrounding the word and evoked by it [...] a cognitive structure internalized by the native speaker". These scripts extend much further than the lexical definition of a word; they contain the speaker's complete knowledge of the concept as it exists in his world. Thus native speakers will have similar but not identical scripts for words they have in common.

To produce the humor of a verbal joke, Raskin posits, the following two conditions must be met:

- "(i) The text is compatible, fully or in part, with two different [semantic] scripts
- (ii) The two scripts with which the text is compatible are opposite [...]. The two scripts with which the text is compatible are said to overlap fully or in part on this text."

Humor is evoked when a trigger at the end of the joke, the punch line, causes the audience to abruptly shift its understanding from the primary (or more obvious) script to the secondary, opposing script.

As an example Raskin uses the following joke:

"Is the doctor at home?" the patient asked in his bronchial whisper. "No," the doctor's young and pretty wife whispered in reply. "Come right in."

For this example, the two scripts contained in the joke are DOCTOR and LOVER; the switch from one to the other is triggered by our understanding of the "whispered" reply of the "young and pretty wife". This reply only makes sense in the script of LOVER, but makes no sense in the script of a bronchial patient going to see the DOCTOR at his (home) office. Raskin expands further on his analysis with more jokes, examining in each how the scripts both overlap and oppose each other in the text.

In order to fulfill the second condition of a joke, Raskin introduces different categories of script opposition. A partial list includes: actual (non-actual), normal (abnormal), possible (impossible), good (bad), life (death), obscene (non-obscene), money (no money), high (low) stature. A complete list of possible script oppositions for jokes is finite and culturally dependent. For example, Soviet political humor does not use the same scripts to be found in Jewish humor. However, for all jokes, in order to generate the humor a connection between the two scripts contained in a given joke must be established. "...one cannot simply juxtapose two incongruous things and call it a joke, but rather one must find a clever way of making them make pseudo-sense together".

=== General theory of verbal humor ===
The general theory of verbal humor (GTVH) was proposed by Victor Raskin and Salvatore Attardo in the article "Script theory revis(it)ed: joke similarity and joke representation model". It integrated Raskin's ideas of Script Opposition (SO), developed in his Script-based Semantic Theory of Humor [SSTH], into the GTVH as one of six levels of independent Knowledge Resources (KRs). These KRs could be used to model individual verbal jokes as well as analyze the degree of similarity or difference between them. The Knowledge Resources proposed in this theory are:

1. Script opposition (SO) references the script opposition included in Raskin's SSTH. This includes, among others, themes such as real (unreal), actual (non-actual), normal (abnormal), possible (impossible).
2. Logical mechanism (LM) refers to the mechanism which connects the different scripts in the joke. These can range from a simple verbal technique like a pun to more complex LMs such as faulty logic or false analogies.
3. Situation (SI) can include objects, activities, instruments, props needed to tell the story.
4. Target (TA) identifies the actor(s) who become the "butt" of the joke. This labeling serves to develop and solidify stereotypes of ethnic groups, professions, etc. This is an optional KR.
5. Narrative strategy (NS) addresses the narrative format of the joke, as either a simple narrative, a dialogue, or a riddle. It attempts to classify the different genres and subgenres of verbal humor. In a subsequent study Attardo expands the NS to include oral and printed humorous narratives of any length, not just jokes.
6. Language (LA) "...contains all the information necessary for the verbalization of a text. It is responsible for the exact wording ...and for the placement of the functional elements."

To illustrate their theory, the authors use 7 examples of the light bulb joke, each variant shifted by a single Knowledge Resource. Each one of the KRs, ordered hierarchically above and starting with the Script Opposition, has the ability to "determine the parameters below themselves, and are determined [circumscribed] by those above themselves. 'Determination' is to be intended as limiting or reducing the options available for the instantiation of the parameter; for example, the choice of the SO [script opposition] DUMB/SMART will reduce the options available to the generation in the TA (in North America to Poles, etc.)"

One of the advantages of this theory (GTVH) over Raskin's script-based semantic theory (SSTH) is that through the inclusion of the Narrative Strategy (NS) any and all humorous texts can be categorized. Whereas Raskin's SSTH only deals with jokes, the GTVH considers all humorous text from spontaneous one-liners to funny stories and literature. This theory can also, by identifying how many of the Knowledge Resources are identical for any two humorous pieces, begin to define the degree of similarity between the two.

As to the ordering of the Knowledge Resources, there has been much discussion. Willibald Ruch, a distinguished German psychologist, and humor researcher, wanted to test empirically the ordering of the Knowledge Resources, with only partial success. Nevertheless, both the listed Knowledge Resources in the GTVH and their relationship to each other has proven to be fertile ground in the further investigation of what exactly makes humor funny.

=== Computer model of humor ===
The computer model of humor was suggested by Suslov in 1992. Investigation of the general scheme of information processing shows the possibility of a specific malfunction, conditioned by the need that a false version should be quickly deleted from consciousness. This specific malfunction can be identified with a humorous effect on psychological grounds: it exactly corresponds to incongruity-resolution theory. However, an essentially new ingredient, the role of timing, is added to the well-known role of ambiguity. In biological systems, a sense of humor inevitably develops in the course of evolution, because its biological function consists of quickening the transmission of the processed information into consciousness and in a more effective use of brain resources. A realization of this algorithm in neural networks justifies naturally Spencer's hypothesis on the mechanism of laughter: deletion of a false version corresponds to zeroing of some part of the neural network and excessive energy of neurons is thrown out to the motor cortex, arousing muscular contractions.

The theory treats on equal footing the humorous effect created by the linguistic means (verbal humor), as well as created visually (caricature, clown performance) or by tickling. The theory explains the natural differences in susceptibility of people to humor, the absence of humorous effect from a trite joke, the role of intonation in telling jokes, nervous laughter, etc. According to this theory, humor has a purely biological origin, while its social functions arose later. This conclusion corresponds to the known fact that monkeys (as pointed out by Charles Darwin) and even rats (as found recently) possess laughter like qualities when playing, drawing conclusions to some potential form of humor.

A practical realization of this algorithm needs extensive databases, whose creation in the automatic regime was suggested recently.

=== Misattribution theory ===
The misattribution theory of humor describes an audience's inability to identify precisely what is funny and why they find a joke humorous. The formal approach is attributed to Zillmann & Bryant (1980) in their article, "Misattribution Theory of Tendentious Humor." However, they derived ideas based on Sigmund Freud. Initially, Freud proposed that audiences do not understand what they find amusing. Freud suggested the tendentious elements paired with the jokes evoke people to experience laughter. It is the taboo and hostility that create such a reaction. Thus, the theory explains how individuals misattribute their responses and believe they laugh at the innocent elements; in reality, the hostility has individuals rolling on the floor.

=== Ontic-epistemic theory of humor ===
The ontic-epistemic theory of humor proposed by P. Marteinson (2006) asserts that laughter is a reaction to a cognitive impasse, a momentary epistemological difficulty, in which the subject perceives that Social Being itself suddenly appears no longer to be real in any factual or normative sense. When this occurs material reality, which is always factually true, is the only percept remaining in the mind at such a moment of comic perception. This theory posits, as in Bergson, that human beings accept as real both normative immaterial percepts, such as social identity, and neological factual percepts, but also that the individual subject normally blends the two together in perception in order to live by the assumption they are equally real. The comic results from the perception that they are not. This same result arises in a number of paradigmatic cases: factual reality can be seen to conflict with and disprove social reality, which Marteinson calls Deculturation; alternatively, social reality can appear to contradict other elements of social reality, which he calls "Relativisation". Laughter, according to Marteinson, serves to reset and re-boot the faculty of social perception, which has been rendered non-functional by the comic situation: it anesthetizes the mind with its euphoria, and permits the forgetting of the comic stimulus, as well as the well-known function of communicating the humorous reaction to other members of society.

=== Sexual selection ===
Evolutionary psychologist Geoffrey Miller contends that, from an evolutionary perspective, humour would have had no survival value to early humans living in the savannas of Africa. He proposes that human characteristics like humor evolved by sexual selection. He argues that humour emerged as an indicator of other traits that were of survival value, such as human intelligence.

=== Detection of mistaken reasoning ===
In 2011, three researchers, Hurley, Dennett and Adams, published a book that reviews previous theories of humor and many specific jokes. They propose the theory that humor evolved because it strengthens the ability of the brain to find mistakes in active belief structures, that is, to detect mistaken reasoning. This is somewhat consistent with the sexual selection theory, because, as stated above, humor would be a reliable indicator of an important survival trait: the ability to detect mistaken reasoning. However, the three researchers argue that humor is fundamentally important because it is the very mechanism that allows the human brain to excel at practical problem solving. Thus, according to them, humor did have survival value even for early humans, because it enhanced the neural circuitry needed to survive.

=== Humor as defense mechanism ===
According to George Eman Vaillant's (1977) categorization, humor is level 4 defense mechanism: overt expression of ideas and feelings (especially those that are unpleasant to focus on or too terrible to talk about) that gives pleasure to others. Humor, which explores the absurdity inherent in any event, enables someone to call a spade a spade, while wit is a form of displacement (level 3). Wit refers to the serious or distressing in a humorous way, rather than disarming it; the thoughts remain distressing, but they are "skirted round" by witticism.

=== Sense of humor, sense of seriousness ===
One must have a sense of humor and a sense of seriousness to distinguish what is supposed to be taken literally or not. An even more keen sense is needed when humor is used to make a serious point. Psychologists have studied how humor is intended to be taken as having seriousness, as when court jesters used humor to convey serious information. Conversely, when humor is not intended to be taken seriously, bad taste in humor may cross a line after which it is taken seriously, though not intended.

=== Metaphor, metonymy, and allegory ===
Tony Veale, who takes a more formalised computational approach than Koestler, has written on the role of metaphor and metonymy in humour, using inspiration from Koestler as well as from Dedre Gentner's theory of structure-mapping, George Lakoff and Mark Johnson's theory of conceptual metaphor, and Mark Turner and Gilles Fauconnier's theory of conceptual blending.

Mikhail Bakhtin's humor theory is one that is based on "poetic metaphor", or the allegory of the protagonist's logosphere.

=== O'Shannon model of humor ===
The O'Shannon model of humor was introduced by Dan O'Shannon in "What Are You Laughing At? A Comprehensive Guide to the Comedic Event", published in 2012. The model integrates all the general branches of comedy into a unified framework. This framework consists of four main sections: context, information, aspects of awareness, and enhancers/inhibitors. Elements of context are in play as reception factors prior to the encounter with comedic information. This information will require a level of cognitive process to interpret, and contain a degree of incongruity (based on predictive likelihood). That degree may be high, or go as low as to be negligible. The information will be seen simultaneously through several aspects of awareness (the comedy's internal reality, its external role as humor, its effect on its context, effect on other receivers, etc.). Any element from any of these sections may trigger enhancers / inhibitors (feelings of superiority, relief, aggression, identification, shock, etc.) which will affect the receiver's ultimate response. The various interactions of the model allow for a wide range of comedy; for example, a joke need not rely on high levels of incongruity if it triggers feelings of superiority, aggression, relief, or identification. Also, high incongruity humor may trigger a visceral response, while well-constructed word-play with low incongruity might trigger a more appreciative response. Also included in the book: evolutionary theories that account for visceral and social laughter, and the phenomenon of comedic entropy.

=== Unnoticed fall-back to former behavior patterns ===
This model defines laughter as an acoustic signal to make individuals aware of an unnoticed fall-back to former behaviour patterns. To some extent it unifies superiority and incongruity theory. Ticklishness is also considered to have a defined relation to humor via the development of human bipedalism.

=== Bergson ===
In Laughter: An Essay on the Meaning of the Comic, French philosopher Henri Bergson, renowned for his philosophical studies on materiality, memory, life and consciousness, tries to determine the laws of the comic and to understand the fundamental causes of comic situations. His method consists in determining the causes of comic instead of analyzing its effects. He also deals with laughter in relation to human life, collective imagination and art, to have a better knowledge of society. One of the theories of the essay is that laughter, as a collective activity, has a social and moral role, in forcing people to eliminate their vices. It is a factor of uniformity of behaviours, as it condemns ludicrous and eccentric behaviours.

In this essay, Bergson also asserts that there is a central cause that all comic situations are derived from: that of mechanism applied to life. The fundamental source of comic is the presence of inflexibility and rigidness in life. For Bergson, the essence of life is movement, elasticity and flexibility, and every comic situation is due to the presence of rigidity and inelasticity in life. Hence, for Bergson the source of the comic is not ugliness but rigidity. All the examples taken by Bergson (such as a man falling in the street, one person's imitation of another, the automatic application of conventions and rules, absent-mindedness, repetitive gestures of a speaker, the resemblance between two faces) are comic situations because they give the impression that life is subject to rigidity, automatism and mechanism.

Bergson closes by noting that most comic situations are not laughable because they are part of collective habits. He defines laughter as an intellectual activity that requires an immediate approach to a comic situation, detached from any form of emotion or sensibility. Bergson finds a situation to be laughable when the attention and the imagination are focused on the resistance and rigidity of the body. Bergson believes that a person is laughable when he or she gives the impression of being a thing or a machine.

=== Complex systems theory ===
A budding area of interest within humor studies is the application of complex dynamic systems theory. Also referred to as complexity or chaos theory, complex systems theory "aims to account for how the interacting parts of a complex system give rise to the system's collective behaviour and how such a system simultaneously interacts with its environment", with "change [being] central to theory and method" (Larsen-Freeman & Cameron, 2008).

In his 2020 book The linguistics of humor: An introduction Attardo calls for a pivot toward transdisciplinary research in humor studies, noting the potential that complex systems theory has in regard to this. Applications of this theory include Tschacher and Haken's (2023) study of incongruity and resolution using visual puns or verbal jokes, in which they connected the results of their research with dynamics seen in psychotherapy. Demjén (2018) also applied complex systems theory to conversational humor to better describe how jokes, puns, and memes originate in a discourse community using complexity based models of understanding language and language use.

== See also ==
- Humor research
- Humor styles – Distinct ways in which people use humor
