= Ram Kumar Panday =

Nepali geographer (born 1946)

Ram Kumar Panday (born 1946) is a Nepali geographer. He is regarded as the first proponent of the study of Nepalese geography. Separately, he was awarded the Humor Prize for lifetime achievement in creative humor literature and other promotional activities.

== Biography ==
At the beginning of his career as a geographer, Panday realised that classical geography did not satisfactorily explain the effects of altitude. In dealing with flat vision and views, the geography of height could not be properly explored or expounded. His fieldwork led to the study of the effects of altitude on Nepali geography. In the 1980s, he published a small preliminary study on the spatial distribution of settlements in the mountains of Nepal. He continued to confront the prospects and problems of altitude effects. Panday applied general aspects of geography to develop a model of the Earth along with its geographic features. In the 1970s, he visited remote reaches of the Himalayan districts and Nepali hill settlements, during the Panchayat system, and later traveled to Japan as a visiting professor at the Osaka City University. He studied a UN course of GIS and Remote Sensing in Sweden.

== Satirist ==
In the political field, he satirized political corruption as an expense in developing nations. He has openly criticized the government, but also proposed ways for the development of the country through his own personal expertise. He has published more than sixty books and several papers on dimensional subjects and topics, both fiction and non-fiction.

== Major Publication ==
Year	Title	Other Books
1987	Altitude Geography of Nepal (English)	Physical Geography of Nepal (Human Geography of Nepal in Nepali)
1989	A Case of Altitude in Geography (English)	Geography Education, Philosophy and Methodology (2049 B.S.) Environmental Education (2053 B.S.) in Nepali
1989	Nepal Studies (Nepali)	Social Studies (Theory and Teaching)
1992	101 Humor Prose (Nepali)	A dozen titles of humor books published since 1966 to 2065 B.S.
1994	101 Humor Poems (Nepali)	
1994	Shoe to the Birds (English and Nepali)	Children's Picture book
1995	Development Disorders in the Himalayan Heights (English)	
1997	Nepalese Cartoons (English)	
1999	Mountain Dimensions (English)	
2000	Nepalese Humor (English)	
2006	Nepal Japan Relations (English)	Japanese Expedition in the Nepal Himalaya (2003), Japanese Cooperation in Nepal (2006)
2008	Yeti Mystery (English)	Yeti Tells (1977), Yeti Accounts (1994) two more volumes in Snowman series
2009	Red Queen (Haiku in English)	Forthcoming Revival (Conversation) Literature)

Ram Kumar Panday is also a poet and writer. He has created Japanese Haiku and Korean Sijo, small sized poems in Nepal. He has written more than 5,000 Nepali and several hundred English Haiku in Nepal.

Panday has also contributed in other fields:

1. Environmental studies
2. Population studies
3. Education
4. Social Studies
5. Nepal Studies
6. Japan Studies
7. Humor and Satire (Essay, stories and Poems)
8. Art Critics
9. Painter
10. Wood-cut Print
11. Children's Literature (Poems and stories)
12. Folk Lore
13. Poet (short styled poems of Japan, Korea and Nepal)
14. Design (house, garden) etc.
