= Attardo =

Attardo is an Italian surname. Notable people with the surname include:

- Salvatore Attardo (born 1962), Belgian–Italian linguist and academic
- Tyler Attardo (born 2001), Canadian soccer player
