= Joseph Boskin =

American historian (1929–2025)

Joseph Boskin (August 10, 1929 – February 16, 2025) was professor of history and ethnic and urban studies at Boston University. His interests included American social history, popular culture, ethnicity, conflict and violence, and humor research.

== Education and work ==
- B.A., State University of New York at Oswego, 1947-1951
- M.A., New York University, 1951-1952
- Ph.D., University of Minnesota, 1954-1959

Previous to joining Boston University in 1969, Boskin taught at Minnesota, Iowa, and The University of Southern California.

Other professional associations included Director, Institute on Law and Urban Studies, Los Angeles, 1970-1971 and Editorial board of the International Journal of Humor Research.

== Personal life ==
Boskin was born in Brooklyn, New York. He died in Lincoln, Massachusetts on February 16, 2025, at the age of 95.

== April Fools Day history ==
Calling it his "Andy Warhol moment," in 1983, Boskin unwittingly fooled Fred Bayles, a reporter for the Associated Press by providing an "explanation" for the origins of April Fools' Day. After being pressed by Bayles during a phone interview, he invented the story that the practice originated in Emperor Constantine's period, when a group of court jesters jocularly told the emperor that jesters could do a better job of running the empire, and the amused emperor nominated a jester, Kugel, to be the king for a day. Boskin related how the jester passed an edict calling for absurdity on that day and the custom became an annual event. Boskin explained the jester's role as being able to put serious matters into perspective with humor. Bayles' story went out on the AP wire and was published up by newspapers across the United States on April 1, 1983.

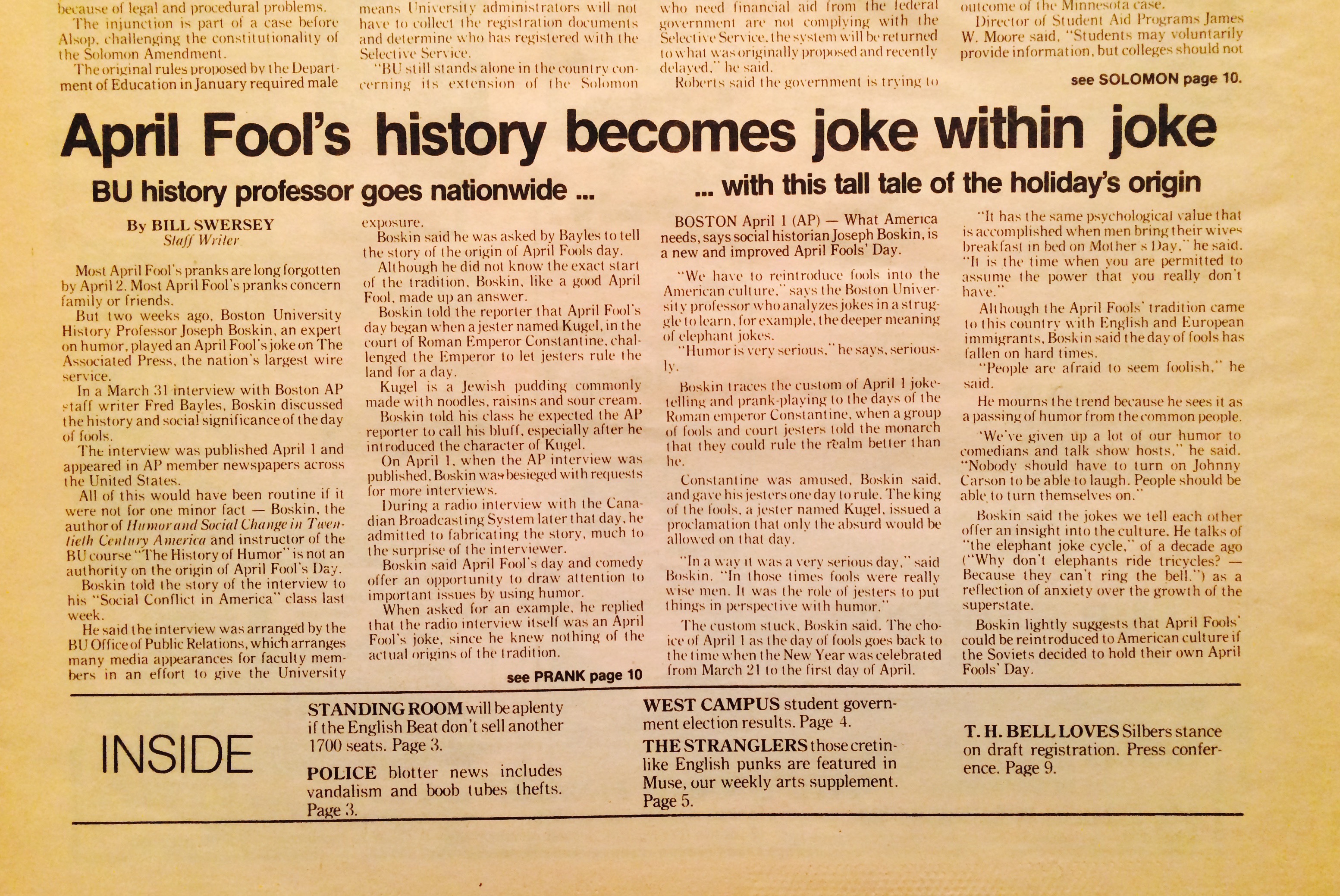
Cropped front page of the Boston University Daily Free Press newspaper, April 14, 1983, showing articles about an April Fools hoax.

The hoax came to light a few weeks later after Boskin recounted the story during a "Social Conflict in America" class, sharing that he was sure Bayles would realize he was joking when he told him the jester's name was Kugel, a kind of Jewish noodle pudding. Bill Swersey, a journalism student in the class, wrote the story for the university's student-run Daily Free Press newspaper, which published it on the front page on April 14, 1983. Ironically Bayles later joined the faculty at Boston University where Boskin was still teaching.

== Books ==
Author

- 2023: A Comedy of Pretzels
- 2011: Corporal Boskin's Cold Cold War: A Comical Journey
  - A historically accurate personal account of Boskin's stay at the American military base in Greenland where he was involved in a study to build a new base there in 1953. Boskin was involved with the Transportation Arctic Group (TRARG), a top-secret, scientific, expeditionary group stationed at Thule Air Force Base.
- 1997: Rebellious Laughter: People's Humor in American Culture
- 1986: Sambo: The Rise and Demise of an American Jester
  - The book was written when Boskin was professor of history and Afro-American studies at Boston University. A book review in The New York Times was mostly positive, with reviewer's major disagreement being with Boskin's argument that the mask of "Sambo the entertainer" contributed to marginalization of African American culture: "But it is Mr. Boskin's insistence on the old image of blacks as crushed victims to which I object most seriously".
- 1979: Humor and Social Change in Twentieth-Century America
- 1976: Into Slavery: Racial Decisions in the Virginia Colony
- 1969: The Oppenheimer Affair: A Political Play in Three Acts (with Fred Krinsky)

Editor

- 1968: (editor) Opposition Politics: the Anti-New Deal Tradition
- 1969: (co-editor, author) Protest in the Sixties, Co-editor and Author 1969
- 1972: (co-ed. with Robert A. Rosenstone, author) Seasons of Rebellion: Protest and Radicalism in Recent America
- 1976: (editor, author) Urban Racial Violence in the Twentieth Century
- 1978: (editor, author) Issues in American Society, Editor and Author
- 1997: (editor, author) The Humor Prism in 20th-century America
