= Paul Lewis (professor) =

Professor of English

Paul Lewis is Professor of English in Boston College, Massachusetts, United States, specializing in humor, American literature and Gothic fiction. He has an A.B. from the City College of New York, a M.A.: University of Manitoba, Ph.D.: University of New Hampshire.

Lewis was the chair of the Edgar Allan Poe Foundation of Boston and played a key role in the project that installed a statue of the Antebellum writer on Bolyston Street in 2014 titled Poe Returning to Boston. Also involving Poe, Lewis oversaw a team that installed an exhibit between December 2009 to March 2010 at the Boston Public Library called The Raven in the Frog Pond: Edgar Allan Poe and the City of Boston, which explored Poe's relationship with contemporary Bostonian writers.

He is also a freelance writer, who invented the neologism "frankenfood", critical of genetically modified food, in a letter he wrote to The New York Times in response to the decision of the US Food and Drug Administration to allow companies to market genetically modified food. The term "frankenfood" has become a battle cry of the European side in the US-EU agricultural trade war.

== Humor research ==
His 2006 book "Cracking Up" about the new heyday of politically charged humor in the United States received significant coverage in the media, for example on ABC Radio, in The Chronicle of Higher Education, and The Boston College Chronicle.

Lewis has served on the editorial board of Humor: The International Journal of Humor Research.

Drawing on Rod A. Martin's view of humor as a multi-dimensional concept and on empirical work in social psychology and sociology, Lewis has developed interdisciplinary approaches to the study of humor in literature, popular culture and politics. His recent work has focused on the Danish cartoon controversy and the impact of ridicule, parody, and joking in the 2008 presidential race.

== Bibliography ==
- Cracking Up: American Humor in a Time of Conflict, The University of Chicago Press, 2006. ISBN 0-226-47699-5
- Comic Effects: Interdisciplinary Approaches to Humor in Literature, State University of New York Press, 1989.
