= Fred Bayles =

American journalist and professor

Fred Bayles is an American professor emeritus of journalism and former journalist. After thirty years as a journalist, he joined the faculty at Boston University in 2004. He was a national correspondent for the Associated Press, where he worked for 20 years, before joining USA Today in 1997. During his career as a reporter, he covered the Gulf War, the Exxon Valdez oil spill, and the murder trial of O. J. Simpson. He is the author of Field Guide to Covering Local News: How to Report on Cops, Courts, Schools, Emergencies and Government.

While at the AP in 1983, Bayles unwittingly wrote a news hoax story about the Roman origins of April Fools' Day, after interviewing Joseph Boskin, a history professor at Boston University.
