= Elliott Oring =

Elliott Oring (born 20 April 1945) is an American author of academic books primarily relating to the topics of folklore, humor, and cultural symbolism. Oring is Professor Emeritus of Anthropology at California State University, Los Angeles, was editor of Western Folklore (1976-1978), and serves on the Editorial Boards of Humor: International Journal of Humor Research. and Journal of Folklore Research. In 2010-2011 he served as President of the International Society for Humor Studies.

== Bibliography ==
- Folk Groups And Folklore Genres: An Introduction (1986)
- Folk Groups And Folklore Genres Reader: A Reader (1989)
- Engaging Humor (2003)
- The Jokes of Sigmund Freud: A Study in Humor and Jewish Identity (1984)
- Israeli Humor: The Content and Structure of the Chizbat of the Palmah (1981)
- The First Book of Jewish Jokes: The Collection of L. M. Büschenthal (2018)
- Just Folklore: Analysis, Interpretation, Critique (2012)
- Jokes and Their Relations (1992)
- Joking Asides :The Theory, Analysis, and Aesthetics of Humor (2016)
- Humor and the Individual (1984)
- The Consolations of Humor and Other Folklore Essays (2023)
