= M. A. Cloudesley Brereton =

British feminist and sanitary reformer

Maud Adeline Cloudesley Brereton
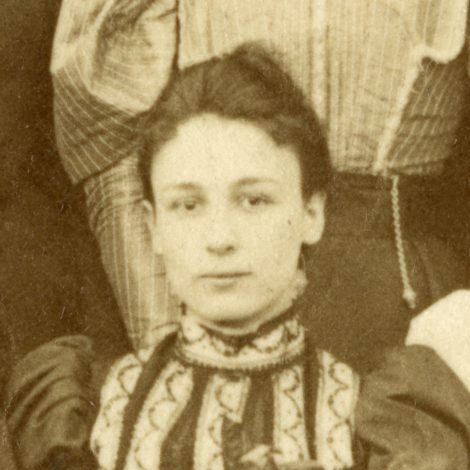
- Born: 19 May 1872; Marylebone
- Died: 16 April 1946 (aged 73); Briningham, Norfolk

Maud Adeline Cloudesley Brereton (19 May 1872 – 16 April 1946), formerly Horobin, née Ford, was a British feminist and sanitary reformer who worked first in education and then as a promotional writer for the gas industry.

== Personal life and education ==
Maud Adeline Ford was born on 19 May 1872 in Marylebone in London, the eldest child of Matthew Ford, a butler and house steward, and Ellen Catherine (née MacDonald). She was baptised in July 1872.

She trained as a teacher at Hockerill College in Bishop's Stortford, Essex, and worked as headmistress of St Andrews Girls School in Willesden in 1893, then from 1894 as headmistress of Baroness Burdett-Coutts School in Highgate, both girls' secondary schools. In 1897 she became resident tutor at Homerton College, Cambridge, marrying the principal, John Horobin, shortly thereafter.

By the time of Horobin's early death in 1902, they had two daughters and a son. One of their daughters, Norah Horobin, went on to become a teacher and ended her career as headmistress of Roedean School. Their son, Ian, became a Conservative Member of Parliament. Maud briefly served as acting principal at Homerton College until 1904, when she married Cloudesley Brereton, with whom she had two sons. She was supportive of the women's suffrage cause.

== Career ==
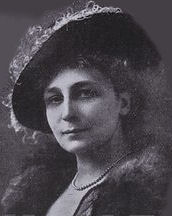
Mrs M. A. Cloudesley Brereton

It was as "Mrs M. A. Cloudesley Brereton" that she became known as a social and sanitary reformer, and the author of The Mother’s Companion (1909), a book of advice for modern wives which promoted equality within marriage. When the British Commercial Gas Association was founded in 1911, she became editor of their Gas Journal (1912–1932). Much of her work was based on the concept of using gas and its technology to alleviate drudgery in the home as a way to improve the health of women and children. She became a leading figure in the campaign for gas, rather than electricity, to be the main source of domestic power. Brereton pushed the gas company managers to use and listen to the feedback from their lady demonstrators, as she believed that this would improve two-way communication between the consumers and producers of gas, and ensure that the domestic difficulties of customers could be factored into provision. She also advised the gas companies to consult with "well-educated lady advisors".

In 1907 she was decorated as an Officier d'Academie by the French government for "services to International Public Health". She was Chairman of the Association for Education in Industry and Commerce in 1923-4 and latterly President of the organisation. She also became a member of the Royal Institute of Public Health and in 1926 became the first female Honorary Fellow of the Institution of Sanitary Engineers, as well as being a member of the Institute of Journalists, vice president of the Society of Women Journalists. She was an early member of the Women's Engineering Society and contributed articles and information to the journal The Woman Engineer in the 1920s. She was a member of the Efficiency Club and served as its president in 1931-2. She was also a member of the Soroptimists.

She retired in 1932 and died in Norfolk on 16 April 1946.

== Books ==
- The Mother's Companion (1909)
- The Future of Our Disabled Sailors and Soldiers (1917)
- Cooking by Gas (1930)
- Unemployed or Reserve? (1930)
