= Angela Boškin =

First professionally trained Slovenian nurse and social worker in Yugoslavia

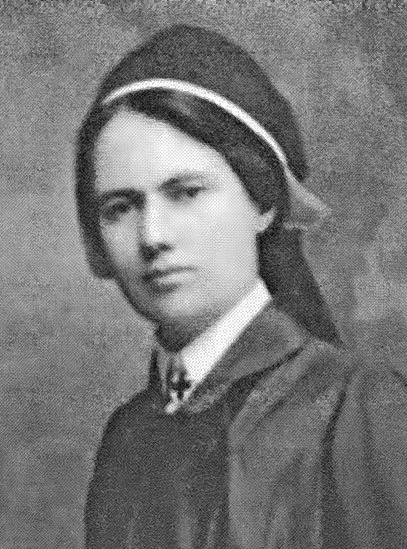
- ca. 1914 at her graduation
- Born: 21 May 1885; Piuma, Princely County of Gorizia and Gradisca, Austria-Hungary
- Died: 28 July 1977 (aged 92); Piuma, Gorizia
- Occupation: nurse
- Years active: 1914-1944
- Known for: first professionally trained Slovenian nurse

Angela Boškin (21 May 1885 – 28 July 1977) was the first professionally trained Slovenian nurse and social worker in Yugoslavia. After training in Austria, she worked as a military nurse during World War I. At the end of the conflict, with her housing and work permits made invalid, she was transported to the new Kingdom of Serbs, Croats and Slovenes, where she became the first public health nurse. Designing programs to teach basic courses in maternity and childcare, Boškin was able to reduce infant mortality rates. She founded and served as the head of the first nursing association of Slovenia.

== Early life ==
Angela Boškin was born on 21 May 1885 in Piuma, in the Princely County of Gorizia and Gradisca of Austria-Hungary. Her father was a blacksmith, but he was able to find little work to feed his nine children. After completing her primary education in Piuma, at age 20, Boškin was sent to Vienna to keep house for her older brother and help him in his store. After seven years, she decided she wanted her own career. Boškin enrolled in nursing school in 1912 and did her practical training at Ernst Wertheim's clinic, graduating in 1914.

== Career ==
After completing her training, Boškin became an assistant to Georg August Wagner, the senior gynecologist at Wertheim's clinic, and worked with maternal and infant care until the war broke out. She was initially assigned to a military reserve clinic and then was posted with a medical team from the Swedish International Red Cross. In 1917, she became the head nurse at the military reserve clinic. Continuing her studies, she completed a course in social and health work in Vienna, passing her examination and preparing to work in Trieste. However, with the dissolution of Austria-Hungary, Slovenes and Croatians who had been residing in Austria were transported to the new Kingdom of Serbs, Croats and Slovenes (Slovene: Kraljevina Slovenaca, Hrvata i Srba, SHS) because their housing and working permits were no longer valid. Initially she was unable to find work, but in 1919, she agreed to go to Jesenice. The area was very poor and initially she served primarily as a home-care nurse, advising mothers on childcare. Realizing how little education on hygiene her patrons had, Boškin began preparing lectures on basic sanitation, childcare, infection prevention, and nutrition.

Boškin began nursing at a workers' center as the first social welfare nurse in SHS and in 1921 founded the first Advisory Centre for Mothers and Babies. Focusing her work on maternal hygiene and infant care, she distributed baskets containing necessary hygienic aids and basic bed linens to new mothers. Her work gained the attention of the pioneering pediatrician Matija Ambrožič, who invited Boškin to move to Ljubljana in 1922 to help in an orphanage. The following year she began working at the Institute of Social Hygiene for the Protection of Girls, lecturing on home nursing services, which was the first training program for care nurses in SHS. In Ljubljana in 1927, Boškin founded the first professional organization of nurses, naming it the Organisation of Graduating Nursing School Students (Slovene: Organizacija absolventk šole za sestre). The organization was renamed the following the Ljubljana Organization of Graduate Nurses (Slovene: Organizacija diplomiranih zaščitnih sester Ljubljane), and Boškin was elected its president. When the country was reorganized into Yugoslavia in 1929, the organization became known as the Association of Yugoslav Nurses (Slovene: Društvo jugoslovanskih medicinskih sester).

Boškin was soon transferred to the mining town of Trbovlje, which had a high infant mortality rate, in which one-third of all babies born died within four days. The area was plagued by extreme poverty, illiteracy, many abandoned children, and juvenile prostitution. Working as she had before, she established an advisory centre, teaching basic care and sanitation, and began to reduce the mortality rate. In 1939, she returned to Ljubljana and began giving traveling exhibitions on hygiene for the Hygiene Institute. Simultaneously, she took a position in Škofja Loka working in the health centre for mothers and children and the anti-tuberculosis service. She retired in 1944 and returned to her home town to live with her sister.

In 1969, Boškin received the Order of Merits for the People with silver rays. Later, she was awarded the Gold Medal of the Nurses and Midwives Association of Slovenia. Boškin died on 28 July 1977 in Piuma.

She is honored by Angela Boškin Day, held annually in the town of Jesenice by the Jesenice General Hospital and the College of Nursing. A documentary film was made about Boškin and aired in 2008.
