= W. Horsfall Carter =

British journalist and European civil servant (1900–1976)

William Horsfall Carter, most commonly known in print as W. Horsfall Carter (25 March 1900 – 9 June 1976) was a British journalist and European civil servant. He wrote and lectured on international affairs, and translated into English from French, German and Spanish.

== Life ==
W. Horsfall Carter was educated at St John's College, Oxford, where he gained a first in modern languages in 1922. After a while as Laming Travelling Fellow at Queen's College, Oxford, Carter entered journalism. He was editorial assistant and assistant leader-writer at The Spectator from 1928 to 1930, and on the editorial staff of the Christian Science Monitor in 1931. From 1932 to 1933 he was Secretary of the New Commonwealth Society and was also editor of The New Commonwealth from 1932 to 1936. From 1937 to 1939 he edited The Fortnightly Review. He wrote leaders for the Manchester Guardian in 1940–42, and was European Publicity Officer for the BBC in 1942–43.

Becoming a civil servant, Carter worked for the Research Department of the Foreign Office from 1943 to 1951, rising to be Head of the Western Europe Section from 1947 to 1951. From 1951 until 1961 he was Head of the Publications Division of the Secretariat of the Council of Europe at Strasbourg.

== Works ==
- (tr. with Mrs Krassin) The Life of Leonid Krassin, 1928
- (tr.) War again to-morrow, London: Faber & Faber, Ltd, 1932
- he assisted R. Ashley Audra and Cloudesley Brereton) with the translation of The two sources of morality and religion by Henri Bergson. New York: H. Holt and Co., 1935.
- (tr.) The Law of Peace by Cornelis van Vollenhoven. London: Macmillan and Co., 1936.
- (tr.) Modern language teaching by television : A survey based on the principal experiments carried out in Western Europe by Raymond Hickel. Strasbourg., 1965.
- Speaking European: the Anglo-Continental cleavage, London: Allen & Unwin, 1966
