= Victor Raskin =

American linguist (born 1944)

Victor Raskin (born April 17, 1944) is a distinguished professor of linguistics at Purdue University. He is the author of Semantic Mechanisms of Humor (1985) and Ontological Semantics (2004) with Sergei Nirenburg and served as the founding editor of Humor, the journal for the International Society for Humor Studies.

== Biography ==
Victor Raskin was born in Irbit, USSR (now Russian Federation) in 1944. He obtained a doctorate in linguistics from Moscow State University in 1970. He has been married to Marina Bergelson since 1965; his daughter Sarah was born in 1982. He and his wife emigrated from the U.S.S.R. to Israel in 1973, and have been Israeli citizens since 1973. They moved to the United States in 1978, became permanent residents of the United States in 1979, and became U.S. citizens in 1984.

== Academic career ==
At Purdue University, Raskin was a professor in the Department of English and the Department of Linguistics. He is also a founding faculty member and associate director of the Center for Education and Research in Information Assurance and Security (CERIAS). He retired in 2023.

== Linguistic theories ==
=== Semantic scripts theory ===
This approach to linguistic meaning differs significantly from truth-conditional/model-theoretic semantics in that it is focused on the meaning of the lexical items as well as on their syntactic relations, rather than on whether the sentences are true or false. Meaning is characterized as a semantic graph (network) consisting of edges (labeled links, such as hyponym, hyperonym, part-of, agent, etc.) and of vertices or nodes (i.e., the scripts). Thus for example, the script for APPLE would be connected by a link labeled ISA (a.k.a, hyperonym) connecting to the script for FRUIT and by various part-of links to other scripts such as PEEL, SEEDS, CORE, FLESH, STEM, etc. Hence the meaning of the word apple is given by the set of links of the script APPLE.

The meaning of a sentence is determined through a process of disambiguation, in which for example the other meanings of “apple” are discarded by contextual pressure (so the sense of “apple” as the computer company is discarded if the sentence reads “the child ate an apple.” However, script-based semantics which many aspects of meaning that are usually seen as part of pragmatics (for example, implicatures, goals, etc.).

Semantic scripts theory is closely related to frame semantics and schema theory and in fact shares their origins in psychology (Bartlett's schemata) and in the work on Artificial Intelligence in the 1970s (what is now known as Good Old-Fashioned Artificial Intelligence). Script-based semantics evolved in a computational direction in the 1990s and became ontological semantics.

=== Ontological semantics ===
Raskin's work in ontological semantics takes place in the context of machine translation. Raskin was one of the early proponents of ontological semantics (Raskin 1990; Nirenburg et al. 1995; Nirenburg and Raskin 2004). In ontological semantics, the ontology, i.e., the hierarchical tree of the ISA links is taken to define the semantic domain. This language independent structure is then mapped onto each individual language. This allows translation from any language into any other language using two dictionaries (for example, in the case of English to Chinese translation all that is needed is an English to ontology mapping and a Chinese to ontology mapping). The advantage of this approach appears when translation is needed between more than two languages. If translating between English, Chinese, Russian and Arabic, one needs English-Chinese, English-Arabic, and English-Russian mappings, but also Chinese-Arabic, Chinese-Russian, and Arabic-Russian mappings (in other words, (n -1)! mappings) whereas one needs only n language to ontology mappings.

Ontological semantics inherits the foundations and all the complex theoretical apparatus of script-based semantics and advances a set of micro-theories (aspect, tense, adjectives, etc.) that cover specific sub-areas of interest in semantics. Given that it is dedicated to actual translation it also incorporates an onomasticon (list of proper names) and a fact database. Procedurally, ontological semantics translates a given text into a Text-Meaning Representation (TMR) which is language independent and consist of items in the ontology and specifies their relations (for example Mary is the AGENT and the “ball” is the PATIENT).

=== Script-based Semantic Theory of Humor (SSTH) ===
In his 1985 book Semantic Mechanisms of Humor, Victor Raskin introduced the Script-based Semantic Theory of Humor (SSTH), which offers a linguistic and cognitive explanation for verbal humor. The theory posits that humor arises when a text is compatible with two distinct and opposing semantic scripts. A script is defined as a cognitive structure that encodes stereotypical information about a particular situation, person, or behaviour, that Raskin defines as “a large chunk of semantic information surrounding a word or evoked by it”. These scripts represent stereotypical scenarios, including participants, actions, goals, and sequences (for example, the script "RESTAURANT" may include sub-scripts such as "SIT DOWN", "ORDER FOOD", "PAY BILL"...)

==== Script Opposition ====
According to SSTH, a text is humorous if it satisfies two specific conditions:

1. Script Overlap: The text is compatible with two different semantic scripts (sets of expectations or knowledge about a situation).
2. Script Opposition: These scripts are in a clear opposition (e.g., real/unreal, life/death, normal/abnormal).

The incongruity between these scripts is what generates humor. The joke typically leads the listener to interpret a scenario according to one script, only to reveal — often in the punchline — that a second, contradictory script is also plausible.

Raskin identifies several common types of oppositions in humor, including:

- Real vs. Unreal
- Normal vs. Abnormal
- Life vs. Death
- Good vs. Bad
- High vs. Low
- Literal vs. Non-literal

These oppositions cause the semantic clash in humorous texts.

==== Mechanism of humor ====
Most jokes, according to Raskin, follow a setup and punchline structure:

- The setup activates Script A, leading the listener to form a certain interpretation.
- The punchline introduces Script B, which forces a reinterpretation of the initial context in light of a conflicting scenario.

The punchline functions as a trigger for reinterpretation, revealing an alternative meaning. Raskin writes:

“The hearer... discovers that a second, conflicting script can be applied to the same text... [and] the realization of the conflict, its resolution, and the switching of scripts are the semantic mechanisms that lead to the humorous effect.” (Raskin 1985, p. 113)

==== "Is the Doctor at Home?" joke ====
This joke has been defined (Attardo 2020, p. 17) an “exemplar,” in the sense of Kuhn (1962), a textbook problem used to teach how to analyze jokes. It is taken from an American joke collection from the 1930s (Raskin 2017, p. 100), primarily because of its simplicity and averageness. As such it reflects the gender stereotypes of the original source.

“Is the doctor at home?” the patient asked in his bronchial whisper.

“No,” the doctor’s young wife replied. “Come right in.”

(Raskin 1985, p. 100)

Here, the setup activates a medical script (a sick patient seeking help), but the punchline triggers a conflicting adultery/affair script, based on the wife's unexpected invitation. The humor stems from the semantic opposition between these two interpretations.

- Setup suggests a medical script (a sick patient visiting a doctor).
- Punchline reveals a seduction/adultery script, incompatible with the first.
- The opposition: Professional (doctor visit) vs. Illicit (romantic affair).

==== "Non bona fide communication" ====
Raskin introduces the distinction between bona fide communication and non-bona fide communication as a key theoretical tool for understanding how humor operates at the pragmatic level.

- Bona fide communication refers to standard, sincere discourse where speakers and hearers cooperate under the assumptions of truthfulness, informativeness, relevance, and clarity—principles aligned with Grice's Cooperative Principle.
- Non-bona fide communication, in contrast, is characterized by a suspension or subversion of these principles. This mode includes joking, teasing, irony, metaphor, and other forms of language use where literal truth is not required, and cooperative maxims are intentionally violated or flouted.

Raskin emphasizes that humorous texts function within this non-bona fide mode:

“A joke... is a bona fide non-bona fide text. It is a text in which the rules of cooperative discourse are intentionally flouted and where a hearer is expected to recognize the deviation as purposeful” (Raskin 1985, p. 103).

Understanding humor thus requires the hearer to switch interpretive frames:

1. Initially processing the joke as if it were bona fide communication.
2. Recognizing cues (typically at or near the punchline) that reveal a non-bona fide reinterpretation is needed.
3. Reconstructing the meaning using an alternative script that violates normal conversational logic.

=== General Theory of Verbal Humor (GTVH) ===
In 1991, Raskin collaborated with Salvatore Attardo to develop the General Theory of Verbal Humor (GTVH), which expanded on SSTH and provided a more comprehensive framework for analyzing jokes. The GTVH identifies six Knowledge Resources (KRs) that structure and define the components of verbal humor:

1. Script Opposition (SO): The overlap of two opposing scripts.
2. Logical Mechanism (LM): The technique that connects the scripts, such as a pun or faulty logic.
3. Situation (SI): The setting or context of the joke.
4. Target (TA): The entity that is the focus of the humor.
5. Narrative Strategy (NS): The structure and delivery of the joke.
6. Language (LG): The linguistic form and style used.

These knowledge resources operate semi-independently and can be manipulated to create variations of the same joke. For instance, changing the Narrative Strategy or Target while maintaining the Script Opposition and Logical Mechanism results in different versions of a joke with similar underlying structures.

=== Education ===
- 1970: Ph.D. in Structural, Computational, and Mathematical Linguistics, Moscow State University, USSR
- 1966: M.A./M.S. summa cum laude in Structural and Computational Linguistics, Moscow State University, USSR
- 1964: B.A./B.S. in Structural and Computational Linguistics, Moscow State University, USSR

=== Experience ===
- 1999–present Editor-at-Large, HUMOR: International Journal of Humor Research
- 1998–present Charter Member, Internal Advisory Board, Center for Education and Research in Information Assurance and Security (CERIAS), Purdue University
- 1994–present PI- and VP-level consultant on natural language and information technology for research laboratories and businesses
- 1980–present Professor of English and Linguistics, Purdue University
- 2000 President, International Society of Humor Research
- 1995-99 Chair, Graduate Interdepartmental Program in Linguistics, Purdue University
- 1987-99 Editor-in-Chief, HUMOR: International Journal of Humor Research
- 1979-99 Chair, Interdepartmental Program in Linguistics, Purdue University
- 1979-80 Associate Professor of English and Linguistics, Purdue University
- 1978-79 Associate Professor of English, Purdue University
- 1978 Visiting Professor of Linguistics, University of Michigan
- 1973-78 Senior Associate Professor of Russian and Philosophy, Hebrew University of Jerusalem
- 1973-78 Senior Associate Professor of Linguistics (half-time), Tel Aviv University, Israel
- 1966-73 From Lecturer to Acting Associate Professor of Linguistics, Moscow State University
- 1962-73 From Junior Assistant to Group Leader, Computational Linguistics Lab, Moscow State University

== Major publications ==
=== Solely authored books ===
- К теории языковых подсистем /Towards a Theory of Linguistic Subsystems/ (420 pp.), Moscow University Press, 1971
- Semantic Mechanisms of Humor (302 pp.), Dordrecht - Boston - Lancaster: D. Reidel, 1985

=== Co-authored books ===
- Методы семантического исследования ограниченного подъязыка /Methods of Semantic Investigation of a Restricted Sublanguage/ (414 pp.), Moscow University Press, 1971 (with B. Gorodetsky)
- Словари словосочетаний и частотные словари слов ограниченного подъязыка /Dictionaries of Word Combinations and Dictionaries of Words with Frequencies of a Restricted Sublanguage/ (538 pp.), Moscow University Press, 1972 (with B. Y. Gorodetsky, A. E. Kibrik, L. S. Logakhina, G. V., Maksimova, and E. S. Prytkov)
- 200 задач по языковедению и математике /200 Problems in Linguistics and Mathematics/ (252 pp.), Moscow University Press, 1972 (with Boris Gorodetsky)
- Продуктивное словосложение в шугнанском, венгерском, саамском, хиналугском и лезгинском языках: Результаты полевой лингвистики /Productive Word Compounding in Shugnan, Hungarian, Saami, Hinalug, and Lezghin: Field Linguistics Results (678 pp.). Moscow: Moscow University Press, 1974 (with Boris Gorodetsky—the book was confiscated and the run, apparently, destroyed after and because of Raskin's emigration in 1973).
- Language and Writing: Applications of Linguistics to Rhetoric and Composition (279 pp.), Norwood, NJ: Ablex, 1987 (with I. H. Weiser)
- Ontological Semantics (350 pp.). Cambridge, MA: MIT Press, 2004 (with Sergei Nirenburg).

== Former students ==
- Christian F. Hempelmann
- Salvatore Attardo
- Sergei Nirenburg
- Dallin D. Oaks
