= International Review of Pragmatics =

- Discipline: Pragmatics
- Language: English
- Edited by: Piotr Cap

Publication details
- History: 2009-present
- Publisher: Brill Publishers
- Frequency: Biannual

Standard abbreviations
- ISO 4: Int. Rev. Pragmat.

Indexing
- ISSN: 1877-3095 (print); 1877-3109 (web)
- LCCN: 2011213412
- OCLC no.: 611945828

Links
- Journal homepage; Online access

The International Review of Pragmatics is a biannual peer-reviewed academic journal covering research in pragmatics and related disciplines. It was established in 2009 and is published by Brill Publishers. The editor-in-chief is Piotr Cap (University of Łódź).

== Abstracting and indexing ==
The journal is abstracted and indexed in:

- CSA Linguistics and Language Behavior Abstracts
- Emerging Sources Citation Index
- ERIH PLUS
- Linguistic Bibliography
- MLA International Bibliography
