= Cloudesley Sharpe =

English cricketer

Cloudesley Brereton Sharpe (5 February 1904 – 11 April 1993) was an English first-class cricketer active 1920–37 who played for Middlesex. He was born in Hampstead; died in Malton, North Yorkshire.
