= Lodz Papers in Pragmatics =

- Discipline: Pragmatics
- Language: Polish

Publication details
- History: 2012–present
- Publisher: De Gruyter (Poland)
- Frequency: Biannually
- Open access: Yes
- ISO 4: Find out here

Links
- Journal homepage

Lodz Papers in Pragmatics is a Polish peer-reviewed open-access academic journal covering pragmatics. It is owned by the University of Łódź and was previously published by Versita Open. The journal was launched in 2012. The founding editor-in-chief is Piotr Cap. It is published biannually by De Gruyter.
