= Cloudesley Brereton =

British educationalist and writer (1863–1937)

Cloudesley Brereton (21 November 1863 – 11 July 1937) was a British educationalist and writer with a particular interest in the teaching of modern languages. He was also a literary translator from French.

== Life ==
Brereton was born on 21 November 1863. He studied at Oundle School, St John's College, Cambridge and the University of Paris. After teaching at the London School of Economics for a short period he became inspector of modern-language teaching for the County of London. In 1904, he married a widow, Maud Adeline Horobin (née Ford), with whom he had two sons.

From 1906 to 1931, he was a member of the progressive association The Rainbow Circle, where he propounded educational reforms.

Taking an interest in the academic training of language teachers, he worked for closer intellectual exchange with both Germany and France. In 1927 he was awarded an honorary doctorate by the University of Lille.

Brereton died in Briningham, Norfolk, on 11 July 1937, aged 73.

== Publications ==
Apart from his contributions to educational journals and to the 14th edition of the Encyclopaedia Britannica (1929–1930), Brereton wrote poetry and non-fiction books, and translated French works into English.

=== Books ===
- Studies in Foreign Education (1913)
- Who is Responsible? (1914)
- The Norfolk Recruit's Farewell: A Ballad (1917)
- Mystica et Lyrica (1919)
- Modern Language Teaching in Day and Evening Schools (1930)
- France: A Handbook for Beginners in French (1936)

=== Translations ===
In 1905 he translated Gabriel Tarde's dystopian science fiction novel, Fragment d'histoire future (1904) as Underground Man.

With Fred Rothwell he translated Henri Bergson's Laughter. First published in 1911, their translation went through several editions to 2005.

Brereson and R. Ashley Audra, with the assistance of W. Horsfall Carter, translated Bergson's The Two Sources of Morality and Religion (1935).
