= Rod A. Martin =

Canadian psychologist

- Occupation: Professor
- Years active: 1984–2016
- Known for: Humor research
- Spouse: Myra
- Children: 3

Academic background
- Education: University of Waterloo

Academic work
- Discipline: Psychology
- Sub-discipline: Humor research

Rod A. Martin is a retired Canadian academic, specializing in clinical psychology and humor research. After obtaining a B.A (1979 ) in theology then an M.A (1981) and PhD (1984) in psychology from the University of Waterloo, in 1984 he became a Professor of Psychology at the University of Western Ontario specializing in clinical psychology. His research focused on the nature and functions of humor and laughter, as well as their relationship to psychological health and well-being.

Martin is often cited for his multi-dimensional concept of humor. His publication The Psychology of Humor: An Integrative Approach was published by Academic Press. He retired in July 2016 and a special issue of Europe's Journal of Psychology was dedicated to him. He has three children with his wife Myra.

== Selected bibliography ==
- — (2007). The Psychology of Humor: An Integrative Approach. Elsevier Academic Press. ISBN 978-0-12-372564-6.
