= Salvatore Attardo =

American humor researcher

Salvatore Attardo is a full professor at Texas A&M University–Commerce and was the editor-in-chief of Humor, the journal for the International Society for Humor Studies from 2002 to 2011. He studied at Purdue University under Victor Raskin and extended Raskin's script-based semantic theory of humor (SSTH) into the general theory of verbal humor (GTVH). He publishes in the field of humor in literature and is considered to be one of the top authorities in the area. He is also the author of Humor 2.0: How the Internet Changed Humor published by Anthem Press in 2023.

He was born March 14, 1962, in Anderlecht, Belgium, to an Italian State Railways employee and a Belgian mother, living thereafter in Como, Italy, until adulthood. He has been a permanent resident of the United States since 1991. He has one daughter, Gaia, born in 1994. Attardo is a native speaker of Italian and French. He has served on the thesis and dissertation committees for other humor scholars, including Christian F. Hempelmann and Katrina Triezenberg.

== Education ==
- Ph.D., 1991. Major: Linguistics/English. Purdue University, West Lafayette, IN. Dissertation: “From Linguistics to Humor Research and Back: Applications of Linguistics to Humor and Their Implications for Linguistic Theory and Methodology” supervised by Professor Victor Raskin. (Dissertations Abstracts International. 1992 July; 53(1): 136A. Purdue U. DA9215518).
- Doctorate, 1986. Major: French Language and Literature /Linguistics (Summa cum laude), Catholic University of Milan, Milan, Italy. Dissertation: “For a Synthesis of Linguistic Research on Humor” [in Italian] supervised by Professor Eddo Rigotti.

== Experience ==
- August 2008–Present: Professor, Department of Literature and Languages, Texas A&M University–Commerce.
- August 2000 – 2008: Professor, Department of English, Youngstown SU.
- September 1996 – 2000: Associate Professor, Department of English, Youngstown SU.
- September 1992 - Sept. 1996: Assistant Professor, Department of English, Youngstown SU.
- March 1994 - 1995: English as a Second Language Program, Coordinator, Youngstown SU.
- Fall 2003 Visiting Professor, Purdue University.
- August 1991 - May 1992: Visiting Lecturer, Department of English, Purdue University.
- January 1991 - May 1991: Visiting Lecturer, Department of English and Linguistics, Indiana University/Purdue University at Ft. Wayne.

== Major publications ==
- Humor 2.0: How the Internet Changed Humor, Anthem Press. 2023
- "Irony as relevant inappropriateness." Journal of Pragmatics 32, 793-826, 2000.
- Second edition of Understanding Language Structure, Interaction, and Variation. 2005. (464 p.)
- Workbook for Understanding Language Structure, Interaction, and Variation. Ann Arbor: University of Michigan Press. 2005. (83 p.)
- Humorous Texts: A semantic and pragmatic analysis. Berlin: Mouton De Gruyter. 2001. (238 p.)
- Quiz Booklet to accompany Understanding Language Structure, Interaction, and Variation. Ann Arbor: University of Michigan Press. 2001. (with Steve Brown) (62 p.)
- Understanding Language Structure, Interaction, and Variation. Ann Arbor: University of Michigan Press. 2000. (with Steve Brown) (411p.)
- Linguistic Theories of Humor, Berlin: Mouton de Gruyter, 1994. (426 p.)
- (Reviewed in Language 72:1, 1996; 132-136; Grazer Linguistische Studies 45,139-145, 1996; Pragmatics 5:3, 395-396, 1995; Discourse and Society 1, 151-153, 1996; Anthropological Linguistics 4:31, 1996; Germanistika 2, 368-369, 1995; HUMOR 8:4 1995, Le scienze 318, 91, 1995; Journal of Pragmatics 24, 606-610, 1996; Studies in Language 20:3, 667-679, 1996; Folia Linguistica 29:1-2, 181, 1995; Lingua e stile 31:4, 674-675, 1996; L’homme 37:142, 117-119, 1997; and others.)
- “Script Theory Revis(it)ed: Joke similarity and joke representation model.” HUMOR: International Journal of Humor Research, 4:3/4, 1991, pp. 347–411. (With Victor Raskin.)

== Trivia ==
As a teenager, Attardo attended a High School specializing in Humanities (Liceo Ginnasio Statale Alessando Volta, Como) where along with fellow students he published a satirical magazine on the school life, its teachers and principal, called "Giravolta." In these early days, he was known by the nickname of "Pidou."
