= Laughter (book) =

1900 collection of three essays by Henri Bergson

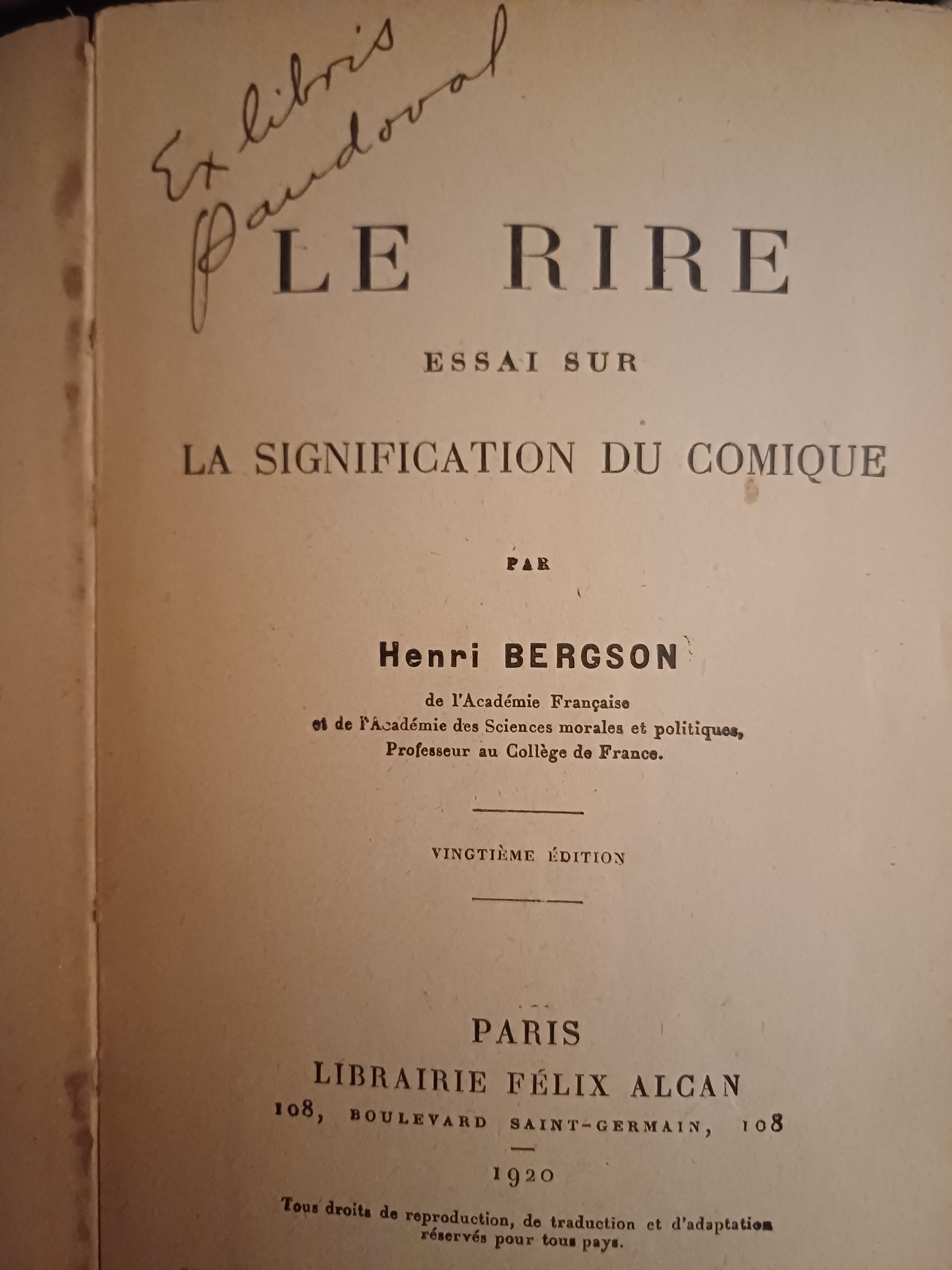
- Author: Henri Bergson
- Original title: Le Rire. Essai sur la signification du comique.
- Language: French
- Subject: Humor
- Genre: Non-fiction
- Published: 1900
- Publication place: France
- Media type: Print

Laughter: An Essay on the Meaning of the Comic is a collection of three essays by French philosopher Henri Bergson, first published in 1900. It was written in French, the original title is Le Rire. Essai sur la signification du comique. It is the first book by a notable philosopher on humor.

As Mark Sinclair comments in Bergson (2020), with this essay, 'Bergson belongs to the small number of major philosophers to have addressed in depth the topic of laughter and the comic as its source'. Furthermore, Sinclair says that the essay is 'a transitional, pivotal moment in Bergson's philosophy as a whole'.

== Publication ==
The three essays were first published in the French review Revue de Paris. A book was published in 1924 by the Alcan publishing house. It was reprinted in 1959 by the Presses Universitaires de France, on the occasion of the hundredth anniversary of the birth of Bergson.

In a foreword published in 1900, but suppressed in 1924, Bergson explains that through the three articles, he wanted to study laughter, especially the laughter caused by the comic, and to determine the principal categories of comic situations, to determine the laws of the comic. He also added a list of works and studies about laughter and the comic.

In the preface written in 1924 to replace the initial foreword, Bergson explains that his method is entirely new because it consists in determining the process of the comic instead of analyzing the effects of the comic. He specifies that his method does not contradict the results of the other one, but he assumes that it is more rigorous from a scientific point of view. He adds a larger bibliography.

The English translation by Cloudesley Brereton and Fred Rothwell, Laughter: An Essay on the Meaning of the Comic, was first published in 1911 and went through several editions to 2005.

== First essay ==
The first essay is made up of three parts:

1. Du comique en général (Of the comic in general)
2. Le comique des formes et le comique des mouvements (The comedy of forms and the comedy of movements)
3. Force d’expansion du comique (The expansive force of the comic)

In a short introduction, Bergson announces that he will try to define the comic, but he does not want to give a rigid definition of the word; he wants to deal with the comic as part of human life. His ambition is also to have a better knowledge of society, of the functioning of human imagination and of collective imagination, but also of art and life.

=== General facts on the comic ===
Bergson begins to note three facts on the comic:

- the comic is strictly a human phenomenon. A landscape cannot be a source of laughter, and when humans make fun of animals, it is often because they recognize some human behaviour in them. Man is not only a being that can laugh, but also a being that is a source of laughter.
- laughter requires an indifference, a detachment from sensibility and emotion: it is more difficult to laugh when one is fully aware of the seriousness of a situation.
- it is difficult to laugh alone, and it is easier to laugh collectively. One who is excluded from a group of people does not laugh with them; there is often a complicity in laughter. Thus, the comic is not a mere pleasure of the intellect, it is a human and social activity; it has a social meaning.

=== The social role of laughter ===
Bergson now assumes that the comic requires the use of intelligence instead of sensibility, and he tries to determine what the real role of intelligence is in a comic situation. He takes the example of a man falling down in the street in front of passers-by. Laughter is caused by an accidental situation, caused by a movement. The source of the comic is the presence of a rigidity in life. Life is defined by Bergson as a perpetual movement; it is characterized by flexibility and agility. Comic situations, such as that of a falling man, are situations where movement is not flexible.

However, the comic is not only based upon unusual situations, but also upon characters and individuals. Bergson takes the example of absent-minded people, a common source of comedy. People tend to associate individuals with a comic character, which increases the comic. In addition, when we make fun of somebody for one of his vices, it is because the individual is unaware of his own vice while we are aware of it. Thus laughter forces people to be better and to suppress their vices, because laughter makes them be conscious of them. This is why Bergson asserts that laughter has a moral role; it is a factor of uniformity of behaviors, and it eliminates ludicrous and eccentric attitudes: "Beyond actions and attitudes that are automatically punished by their natural consequences, there remains a certain inflexibility of the body, of the mind and of the character that society would like to eliminate to obtain a greater elasticity and a better sociability of its members. This inflexibility is the comic, laughter is the punishment".

=== Comic and forms of materiality ===
Laughter can be caused by ugliness, but ugliness is not always comic. To laugh about ugliness, we need to have a naive, immediate, original approach, not to think. We also have to focus on a specific feature of the person and to associate the person with this feature. It is the same with cartoonists, who exaggerate physical and natural features of people. Our imagination sees in everyone the efforts of the soul to dynamise materiality, the soul or the mind give flexibility, agility and animation to the rigid body and to materiality. However the body tends to rigidify itself, and it produces a comic effect: "When materiality succeeds in fixing the movement of the soul, in hindering its grace, it obtains a comic effect. To define comic in comparison to its contrary, we should oppose it to grace instead of beauty. It is stiffness rather than ugliness".

=== Comic of gesture and movements ===
Bergson concludes as an immediate consequence of the previous chapter that "attitudes, gestures and movements of the human body are subject to laughter precisely in the way that body makes us think to a simple machine". Humans tend to laugh when they see the effect of a machine within the human body. This is why when we concentrate our attention on a particular gesture made by a speaker to better express his thinking, we automatically find it comic whereas this movement in itself is not comic. We also laugh when someone imitates somebody else, because to imitate somebody, the imitator reproduces the most mechanical, the most unconscious movements and gestures of the person. This is also the case with the parody of an activity. For Bergson, this explains also why, as Pascal had noted, when we see two faces that look very much alike, we find it comic, while the faces alone are not comic. And finally: "This is because really lively life is not supposed to repeat itself. Where there is repetition, complete similarity, we suspect that there is mechanism behind life. That diversion of life towards mechanism is the real cause of laughter".

=== The comic and human imagination ===
At the beginning of chapter five, Bergson thinks again about his method of analysis. He recalls that to look for a unique method of the comic does not make sense. However, there is a central cause of the comic, and all comic situations are derived from it. This central cause is mechanism applied to life, and all comic effects are articulated around this cause by our imagination. There are three main directions in which our imagination is oriented to produce comic effects, three general laws:

- a lot of things are comic en droit (de jure) whereas they are not comic en fait (de facto), because common use and collective habits generalize these comic situations. Hence the mind needs to break with fashion to revive and to note the comedy of the situation, not to create it, Bergson insists. He takes the example of clothes: fashionable clothes do not make us laugh, because we are used to seeing them, while we automatically make fun of someone who wears old-fashioned clothes. Also the application of social conventions and rules are comic situation because these regulations and applied automatically, mechanically. "A mechanism inserted into nature, an automatic regulation of society, these are the two kinds of funny effects at which we are ending up".
- contrary to the body, the soul is perfectly flexible, always in activity. However, we tend to attribute these qualities to the body, we consider it as flexible and ignore its resistance, its materiality. But when we are fully aware that the body is a weight, a burden for the soul, the situation is comic. Hence, "is comic any incident which attracts our attention on the physique of a person while the mind is active". There is a comic effect when our attention is diverted from the mind to the physique.
- we laugh every time somebody looks like a material thing, every time we are under the impression that someone is a thing.
