= Humor (journal) =

- Discipline: inter- and multidisciplinary
- Language: English
- Edited by: Christian F. Hempelmann

Publication details
- History: 1988–present
- Publisher: Walter de Gruyter
- Frequency: Quarterly
- Impact factor: 0.857 (2011)

Standard abbreviations
- ISO 4: Humor

Indexing
- 0933-1719
- ISSN: 1613-3722

Links
- Journal homepage

Humor: International Journal of Humor Research is a peer-reviewed academic journal published by Walter de Gruyter on behalf of the International Society for Humor Studies. As of 2021, its editor-in-chief is Christian F. Hempelmann (Texas A&M University-Commerce).

== Overview ==
The journal publishes articles from a wide range of disciplines (e.g. psychology, literature, linguistics, sociology, theater, communication, philosophy, anthropology, computer science, history) as well as interdisciplinary articles related to humor research. The journal publishes mainly original research articles, but also theoretical papers, book reviews, scholarly debates, notes, and letters to editors. According to the Journal Citation Reports, its 2011 impact factor is 0.857.

== History ==
The journal was established in 1988 with founding editor-in-chief Victor Raskin. The full list of editors-in-chief is:

- Victor Raskin (1988–1999)
- Lawrence E. Mintz (2000–2002)
- Salvatore Attardo (2003–2012)
- Giselinde Kuipers (2012–2015)
- Thomas E. Ford (2016–2020)
- Christian F. Hempelmann (2021–present)
