= Humor research =

Study of the effects of humor

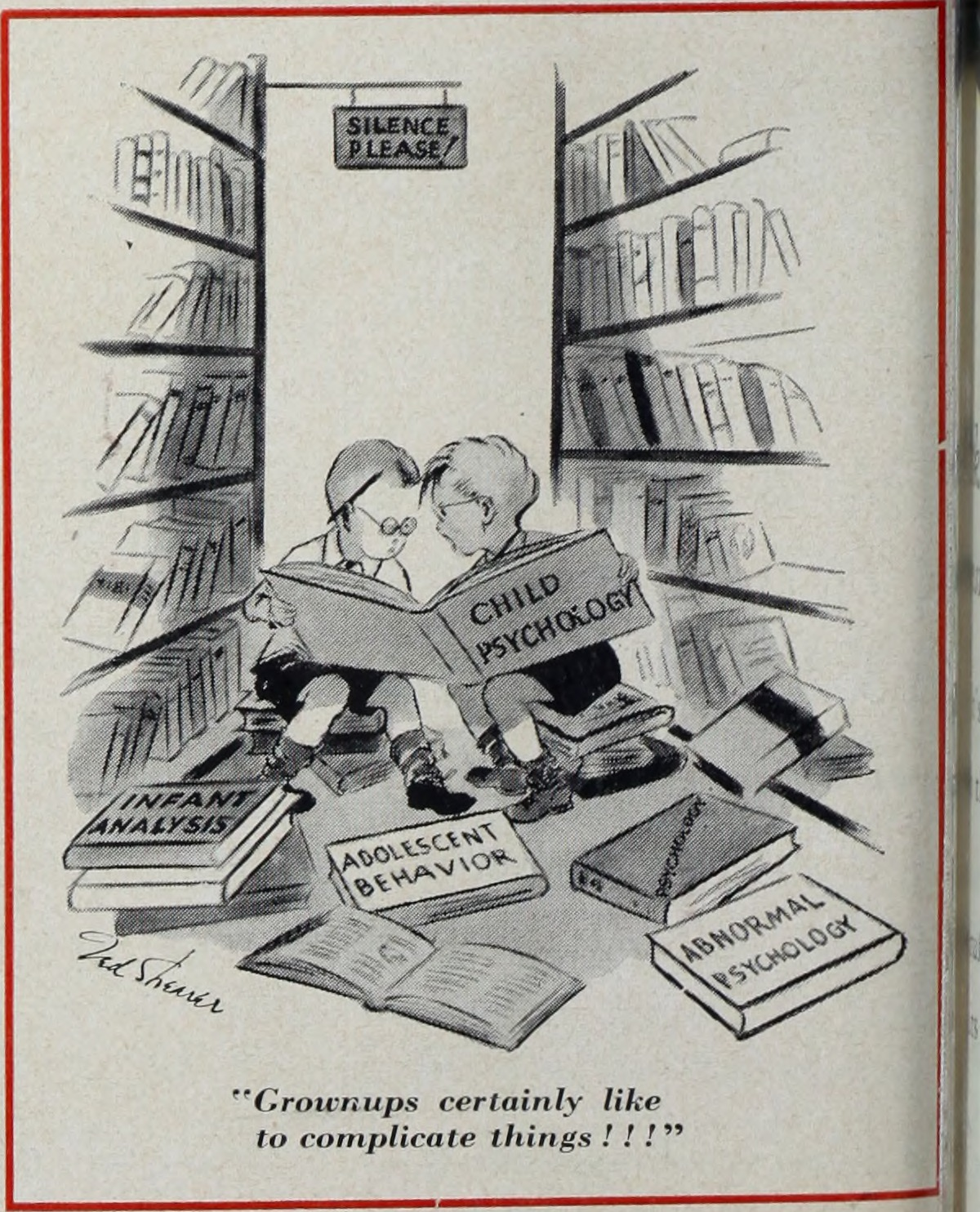
Comic from The Ladies' Home Journal (1948) showing two children reading from a book titled Child Psychology and remarking "Grownups certainly like to complicate things!"

Humor research (also humor studies) is a multifaceted field which enters the domains of linguistics, history, and literature. Research in humor has been done to understand the psychological and physiological effects, both positive and negative, on a person or groups of people. Research in humor has revealed many different theories of humor and many different kinds of humor including their functions and effects personally, in relationships, and in society.

== Areas ==
Humor research deals with a wide variety of issues, which can be categorized according to several theories of humor. Because of its interdisciplinary nature, humor research has many areas of study which aim to explain the phenomenon of humor.

=== Neuroanatomy of humor ===
Cognitive neuroscience has provided insight into how humor is neurologically realized. Brain imaging techniques such as fMRI and PET scans have been implemented in this subfield of humor research.

There are a few main regions of the human brain associated with humor and laughter. The production of laughter involves two primary brain pathways, one for involuntary and one for voluntary laughter (i.e., Duchenne and non-Duchenne laughter). Involuntary laughter is usually emotionally driven and includes key emotional brain areas such as the amygdala, thalamic areas, and the brainstem. Voluntary laughter, however, begins in the premotor opercular area in the temporal lobe and moves to the motor cortex and pyramidal tract before moving to the brainstem. Wild et al. (2003) propose that the generation of laughter is mostly influenced by neural pathways that go from the premotor and motor cortex to the ventral side of the brainstem through the cerebral peduncles. It is also suggested that real laughter is not produced from the motor cortex, but that the normal inhibition of cortical frontal areas stops during laughter.

When the electrical activity of the brain is measured during and after hearing a joke, a prominent response can be seen approximately 300ms after the punchline, followed by a depolarization about 100ms later. The fact that humor response occurs in two separate waves of activity supports the idea that humor processing occurs in two stages.

Functional MRI and PET studies further illuminate which parts of the brain are participating in the experience of humor. A study by Ozawa et al. (2000) found that when participants heard sentences that they rated as humorous, the Broca's area and the middle frontal gyrus were activated. Additionally, Wernicke's area and the transverse temporal gyri were activated, but these areas were also found to be active in control (non-humorous) conditions.

Another study using fMRI showed that the linguistic basis of jokes participants found to be humorous impacted which parts of the brain were activated. In response to puns, the left posterior middle temporal gyrus and the left inferior frontal gyrus were activated. When listening to semantic jokes, the left posterior middle temporal gyrus was again activated, as were the left posterior inferior temporal gyrus, the right posterior middle temporal gyrus, and the cerebellum. Brain activity in the medial ventral prefrontal cortex was associated with ratings of funniness that the participants gave after the brain scan and initial humor response. This response may stem from the mood or emotional change that occurs after hearing humor.

Induction of laughter through direct brain stimulation has been reported in a number of studies, and includes areas such as anterior cingulate cortex (ACC), globus pallidus, floor of the third ventricle, and most recently left superior frontal gyrus – though these results are hard to draw inferences from (may be inhibitory, may be artefacts, etc.) Because the nature of laughter is so complex—involving facial muscles, respiratory actions, etc.--a control center has been hypothesized in the upper pons.

=== Play research ===
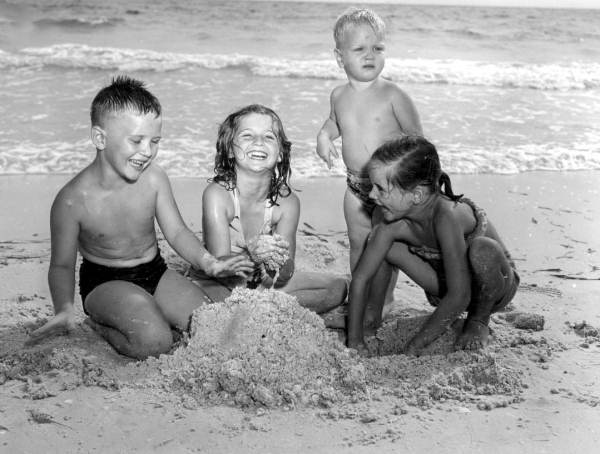
Children playing in the sand in Florida, United States

Studies within play research have provided correlates to the study of humor, as play often takes on a humorous demeanor. A child's social play often invokes the use of jokes, non-serious social incongruity, physical slapstick humor. Studies on how play "promot[es] social cohesion, cooperation, and even altruism," have been used to describe humor's function. Laughter is often a byproduct of playful social interactions, and can therefore be viewed as serving a similar function as play. It can be said that the perception and appreciation of humor decreases aggression and stress while promoting cooperation and fairness. Play research can provide a functional look at humor in its relation to social interactions.

=== Evolutionary psychology ===
Evolutionary theorists have attempted to study and explain the phenomena of laughter and humor in terms of survival benefit. Laughter-like behavior is not unique to humans, but humans do display a much more consistent and complex use of humor and laughter than other animals. The evolution and functions of laughter and humor have been explored in an attempt to understand how and why humor and laughter have become part of human existence. Research by Scott et al. (2014) states that social functions of laughter strengthens bonds within groups and help coordinate social interactions. They argue that laughter is also heavily shaped by social context, that laughter goes beyond just responding to something they think is "humorous," but also to communicate in other ways.

Duchenne laughter refers to laughter that is stimulus-driven and linked to some positive experience. This is usually the result of a perceived social incongruity. Non-Duchenne laughter refers to laughter that is unconnected to any emotional experience, but rather laughter that is originated voluntarily. Duchenne laughter evolved before non-Duchenne laughter with the function of making play and playful emotions contagious. In these situations, laughter serves as an in-group designator. Early evolutionary laughter is also theorized to serve the function of dissolving social tension. During moments of displays of social superiority, laughter could be used to dissolve tensions that otherwise could lead to fighting or exclusion from a group, by designating those situations as play rather than as a real challenge. Duchenne laughter, which should be thought of as emotionally-valenced rather than simply spontaneous, can increase positive affect and mood of an individual as well as a group. So, early laughter most likely provided survival benefits through effects of emotional contagion that served to strengthen within-group ties. Non-duchenne laughter developed later than Duchenne laughter. Non-duchenne laughter was co-opted for a variety of other social situations as laughter and humor already existed. Voluntarily accessing the laughter system that was already in place would serve to strengthen in-group fitness just as genuine, emotional laughter did before it, but now it could be done at will. Thus, non-Duchenne laughter developed to express things like aggression, nervousness, hierarchy positions, and to do things such as manipulate, appease, and make fun of others. Even when non-Duchenne laughter is unconscious, that does not mean it is necessarily emotional or using the same brain pathways as genuine Duchenne laughter. As social situations became more complex in later hominid stages of evolution, so did the functions and usefulness of laughter. As linguistics developed, proto-laughter and proto-humor were both co-opted for assistance in the production of and response to effective communication.

==== Humor as a mental fitness indicator ====
It has been hypothesized that intentional humor evolved as indicator of intelligence. Humor is often rated as important in mate selection, and it may be that partners are selecting for genetic fitness. General intelligence predicted higher ratings on humor tasks, even after controlling for Big Five personality factors.

Greengross & Miller propose that humor plays into sexual selection. Rather than being sexually attractive for its own sake, humor is attractive because it is an indicator of other things which humor is correlated with, such as intelligence, [creativity], and other desirable traits. Intelligence has been shown to be a mental fitness indicator and is highly sexually desirable for both traits Intelligence and humor ability are positively correlated and the ability to produce humor on the spot predicts mating success.

A large proportion of humor is produced during informal conversation and involves the derision of a specific person (either oneself or another). The adaptiveness of deprecating humor in social interactions is a point of interest among researchers. Drawing attention to one's own faults seems counter-intuitive when considering humor's function of strengthening within-group fitness and sexual desirability. Other-deprecating humor has functions which are implicated in establishing same-sex rivalries. This sort of humor usually targets fitness indicators of rivals, which can be risky if an opponent perceives the humor as a threat worthy of retaliation. Self-deprecating humor is proposed to fit within cost signaling theory. Greengross and Miller found that self-deprecating humor had predictive value for long-term sexual attractiveness. However, this occurred as an interaction effect, and only was predictive for high-status individuals. Self-deprecating humor may only work for high-status individuals because it ironically points out the desirable traits by way of discrepancy. In low-status individuals, this approach is unproductive, as the humor is pointing to actual weak fitness traits rather than a discrepancy as with high-status individuals.

== Benefits of humor ==
=== Psychological benefits ===
==== Humor style and psychological outcomes ====
There are two adaptive styles of humor and two maladaptive styles of humor. Affiliative and self-enhancing humor are the two adaptive styles. The defining feature of affiliative humor is humor that is used to strengthen interpersonal relationships or ease tensions within those relationships. Self-enhancing humor involves the use of a humorous outlook on situations in life as a coping tool. In this instance, humor is used to mitigate stress without targeting others or the self in a hurtful way. The two maladaptive humor styles are aggressive humor, which uses sarcasm and other humor styles to target or put down others and self-defeating humor, which uses self-deprecating tactics for the enjoyment of others. Martin et al. (2003) found that higher levels of adaptive humor are related to psychological well-being in terms of lower levels of depression and higher self-esteem. Self-defeating humor contrasts with the adaptive types, and is associated with poorer psychological health. Building on maladaptive and adaptive styles, a study by Doingi et al. (2023-11-30) also distinguishes between two humor styles, known as light and dark. Light humor attempts to ease tension and is light-hearted and fun. Dark humor is cynical and attains to more aggressive themes, similar to maladaptive humor. In the study, light humor styles were associated with positive mental health and lower reports of depression, anxiety, and stress. On the other hand, dark humor tended to have higher links to psychological distress. These findings pointed to the fact that not all humor can function the same way for mental health. Kuiper and McHale (2009) found support for humor styles being mediators between self-evaluation and psychological well-being. Simply put, rather than humor styles directly affecting psychological well-being, they are involved with how people self-evaluate, which results in different amounts of psychological well-being. Psychological school adjustment is also associated with humor style use, with a positive correlation of affiliative humor and school adjustment and a negative correlation of self-defeating humor and school adjustment.

In a study examining humor as an intervention, random assignment to a humor group, a social group, and a non-intervention control group was used. A standardized manual and booklet were used in the intervention group, and results showed that the humor group demonstrated significant increases in emotional well-being. Importantly, self-efficacy, positive affect, optimism, and perceptions of control were found to go up while other negative measures decreased. Crawford & Caltabiano (2011) found support for humor as an intervention which may increase positive aspects of emotional well-being. Humor skills of the intervention group were targeted through the use of a manual. Humor increased several measures of well-being including self-efficacy, positive affect, optimism, and perception of control, even more than a "social group" control or a non-intervention control group. The exposure to humor and humor skills training was also found to decrease certain negative aspects of emotional well-being, including perceived stress, certain depressive symptoms, and anxiety.

==== Benefit vs. detriment of humor ====
Adaptive components of humor show facilitative effects on psychological well-being. Maladaptive styles that were self-focused showed detrimental effects, while maladaptive styles that did not focus on self were unrelated to personal well-being. Self-deprecating humor is the specific component of maladaptive humor that results in decreased psychological well-being, while both of the adaptive styles of humor (affiliative and self-enhancing) are associated with positive psychological outcomes, such as greater self-esteem, lower depression and anxiety levels, and greater endorsement of self-efficacy. The relevant psychological states may have preceded the humor style rather than vice versa.

=== Physical health benefits ===
Humor research includes investigations into the positive benefits of humor, sense of humor, and laughter on physical health. In recent decades, humor research has seen a surge in publications in part because of Norman Cousins and his claims that he became cured from ankylosing spondilitis due to a daily regimen which included humor and laughter.

According to the U.S. Department of Veteran Affairs, laughter can produce physiological changes such as reduces hormone levels, activation of rewards pathways in the brain, and increased circulation. These effects often lead to relaxation and improved mood. Regular engagement with humor may also support physical and psychological well being in the long run.

==== Mental Health Benefits ====
Humor research has positive benefits on mental health. Similarly, humor research helps people to ease their suffering from pains like anxiety and depression. Furthermore, It will add joy, ease anxiety and stress. One thing that guaranteed laughing can help ease their suffering is to laugh every day or find anything that can keep your brain from any negative contact. For instance, those negative contact can be physical, and emotional abuse. Laughter is an approach to strengthen your immune system as well as alleviate stress hormones and raise your immune cells. This includes making your brain and blood flow to be stress-free, making your mental state at ease and allowing to be more yourself. In recent years, study has demonstrated that humor is a way to help boost moods from stress and anxiety to happiness due to the fact that laughing helps to alleviate blood pressure that triggers the release of hormones and also to relieve anxiety. In addition, this is why humor plays a huge part for patient who has either depression or anxiety because it provide your physical body to be healthy and improves your mental state as well.

==== Humor and immune response ====
Positive affect is theorized to influence physical health by means of the immune system. The immune system could be influenced positively by humor in a number of ways. The possibilities include simple immunoenhancement, stress moderation, or both. The pleasant experience of humor is thought to positively influence affect so that stress is moderated. The antibody secretory immunoglobin A (S-IgA) is associated with both positive and negative affect states, with negative states decreasing effectiveness and positive states increasing effects of the antibody. Levels of immune response can be predicted by the number of desirable events (and presumably mood) which occur in preceding days to the immune assessment. However, there is also evidence that significant mood changes in either direction can induce an increase in immune response. Laughter as an overt behavior is also associated with immune response, specifically NK cell activity, which are part of the body's immune response. Glucocorticoids are lower in subjects who laughed while watching a humorous video, and glucocorticoids decrease NK cell activity, so humor theory posits this pathway as a possible mechanism for humor as a benefit to immune responses. However, it is unclear whether these effects on this specific immune response measurement have long-term effects with clinical significance. Using humor as a coping style is a way which these long-term effects on the immune system may be enacted. In one study, levels of S-IgA and the use of humor as a coping style were positively correlated, although the saliva sampling procedure of this study was subsequently called into question.

==== Humor and stress ====
Humor is thought to play a role in the levels of stress that people experience, both in the short-term and long-term. Watching a humorous video for 20 minutes can significantly lower stress levels, on a level comparable to 20 minutes of exercise. Since watching a video is more widely feasible than exercising for 20 minutes for large portions of the population, humor researchers hope that the acute anxiety-alleviating effects of humor can be used in a therapeutic setting. Although acute benefits of humor may be obtained, this does not guarantee any long term benefits.

Humor and pain

Humor's effect on pain tolerance is another point of interest within humor research. Hypotheses for this research include the idea that the positive feelings of humor will increase the threshold of pain that a person can endure. These ideas are implicit in some folk wisdom as well as in anecdotes such as Norman Cousins' recovery story. Though not all studies have shown support for the pain-reducing effect of humor, humor and comedy stimuli do have effects on pain tolerance and perception, particularly when pain is assessed after the humor stimuli is completed. Based on the measures of most studies examining pain, it is difficult to tell if simply consuming humorous material is sufficient for pain reduction, or if actual laughter is a necessary component. Further, some studies that used negative affect control groups found that pain thresholds also increased for people experiencing unsettling stimuli, such as a clip from a horror movie. So, humor does have an effect on pain, but it is unclear what exact behavioral requirements are necessary as well as if humor has an effect greater than other emotionally salient experiences.

==== Issues in humor research and physical health ====
Even though the positive benefits of humor have been lauded by popular media and have found support among scientific research, the field of humor research also has received criticism. The scientific support for the physical benefits of humor are somewhat sparse, and the findings from the existing research have been called into question in some cases. Humor is assessed differently based on the theories which underpin the research, such as whether humor is a stable personality trait or not. Because of the non-standard measurements of humor in research, it is difficult to tell whether researchers are measuring the same thing across studies. Sense of humor, internal humor response, and laughter can all be targeted to measure humor, but are not necessarily interchangeable. Martin (2001) critiques several studies for not measuring laughter along with their self-report humor measures.

Aside from theoretical issues, the methods of some key humor research was also called into question by Martin. For example, the immune response sampling techniques of some humor research may have not been reliable because of how baseline immune levels were set. According to Martin (2001), within the nine studies assessing S-IgA levels in response to humor, three did not have control groups, five had control groups which involved a documentary viewing where interest was not assessed, and only one study had a negative affect control. Proper use of control groups is among the major issues within humor research. Some experimental findings are encouraging, but no firm conclusions involving humor and physical health where controls were not used correctly can be drawn. Thus, there is only partial support of immune effects of humor.this is it.

=== Humor in marriage ===
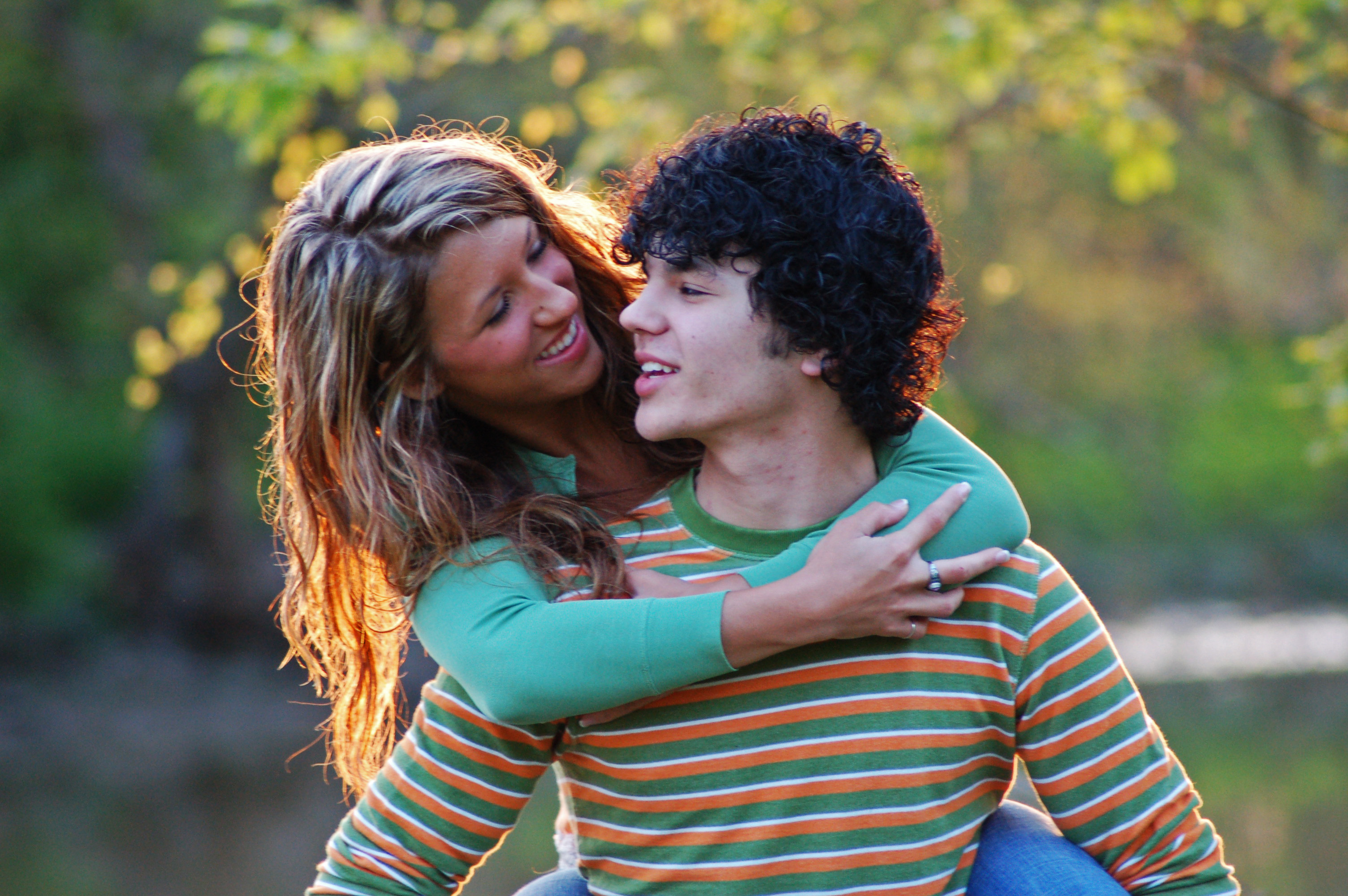
A couple laughing together

In 2002, a study was conducted on the functions of humor in close relationships. The study examined three types of humor:

- positive humor, describing positive aspects of humor, such as humor appreciation, attractiveness, and closeness
- negative humor, describing humor used to express aggression, or humor used in a manipulative manner
- instrumental humor, measuring the extent to which the person uses humor to avoid tension or tries to smooth over negative feelings

Positive humor is expected to be related to intimacy and marital satisfaction. This relation was true for the wives, but not for the husbands. This suggests that whether or not husbands use positive humor, it has nothing to do with how closely they feel to their partner or their marital satisfaction. Research suggests that instrumental humor is negatively related to marital satisfaction and is an indicator of potential future marital deterioration. Results showed that husbands acknowledged using instrumental humor in their relationship in relation to demand-withdrawal, in which the wife demands and the husband withdraws. Wives, on the other hand, did not acknowledge the use of instrumental humor in this communication pattern. This seems to indicate that men more often withdraw than women, in this case, with the use of humor. Negative humor was not related to any of the other humor measure in the study. This makes sense considering that put-downs or hurtful humor does not tend to lead to laughter or humor appreciation. Negative humor items in the questionnaire given to the participants described expressing negative emotion. Negative humor somewhat correlated with demand-withdrawal for husbands and wives. This humor can be a form of passive aggressiveness where the one using the humor is not taking responsibility for the put-down or hurtful joke, and in doing so, avoiding, or withdrawing from, conflict.

== Measuring responses to humor ==
When someone finds something funny, there are different ways of expressing it. Common responses of humor include laughing and smiling. In 2008, a study was conducted using 155 undergraduate students at North London University in order to measure responses to humor using a British comedy. The participants were divided into one of three categories: watched a video of the comedy, listened to an audiotape of the comedy, or read a script of the comedy. Approximately half of the participants were observed by an overt video camera and half were observed by a covert video camera. Results showed that participants laughed and smiled much more frequently when watching a video of the comedy and listening to the audiotape of the comedy than when reading a script. The difference in the frequency of smiling and laughing between the video and the audiotape was not significant. Participants laughed and smiled more frequently when observed by a covert video camera than an overt video camera. Aspects of the video and audiotape such as visualization of the acting, auditory representation, and also the presence of audience laughter significantly increase the frequency of laughter and smiling.

== See also ==
- List of publications in humor research
- Theories of humor
