= Rinat Matatov =

Israeli actress

- רינת מטטוב
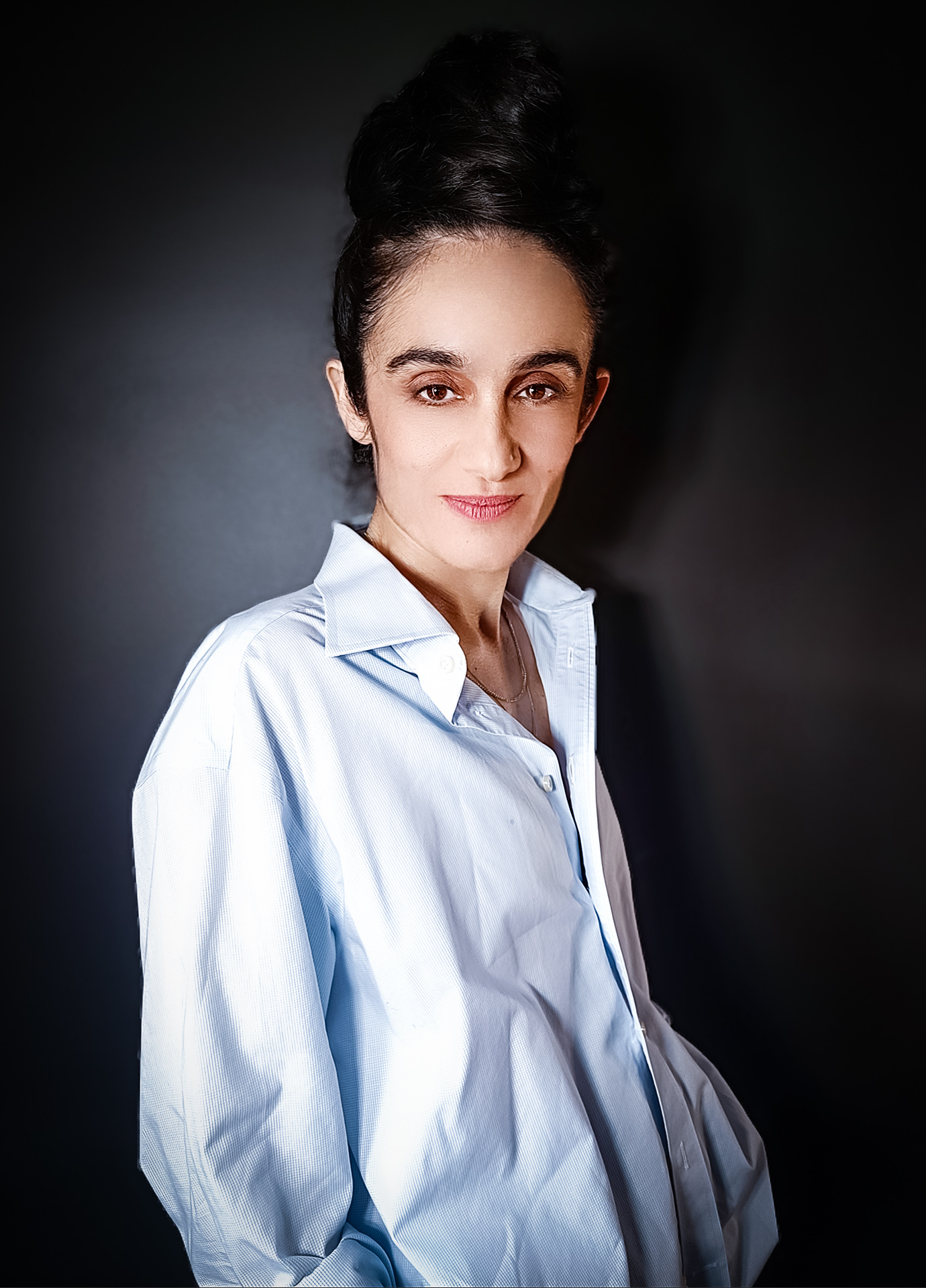
- Born: 6 August 1981 (age 44); Kokand, Uzbek SSR, Soviet Union
- Occupations: film actress, theatre actress
- Years active: 2005–present

Rinat Matatov (Hebrew: רינת מטטוב; born 6 August 1981) is an Israeli film and stage actress. She is the winner of the Outstanding Actress Award at the Haifa Festival for Children's Plays in 2013, for her role in the play "Listen to My Voice", and in 2017 for her role in the play "Aunt Leah by Shumish", and the Actress Award at the Israel Theater Prize for her role in the play "Crazy" in 2009.

== Biography ==
Matatov was born in Kokand, Uzbek SSR (today in Uzbekistan), to a Bukharian Jewish family. In 1990, the Matatov family (her parents, she, and her younger brother) immigrated to Israel and settled in the Tel Giborim neighborhood in Holon. Matatov first studied acting as a theatre major at the Chaim Herzog High School for Science, Arts and the Humanities, Holon. After graduating, she joined the military service as a member of Nahal.

Following her release from Nahal, she started her professional acting studies at the Performing Arts Studio of Yoram Loewenstein, graduating in 2004. Right after graduating, Matatov received her first role in the film Someone to Run With based on David Grossman’s book.

At the same time, Matatov also began her career at the Habima National Theater in a leading role in the play "The Dispute," adapted and directed by director Sigal Avin. Immediately afterward, she continued in the critically acclaimed play "Crazy" by and directed by Yaeli Ronen.

Over the years at Habima, Matatov made her debut at the Globe Theatre in The Merchant of Venice as Nerissa, and a performance in "To the End of the Land", based on the book by David Grossman, directed by Hanan Snir, at Lincoln Center in New York, starring Efrat Ben-Tzur and Dror Cohen.

Matatov won the 2009 Israel Theatre Award for her role in the play Crazy at Habima Theater..

Matatov won the 2011 Children and Youth Stage Award as Supporting Actress of the Year for her role in the play "Good Girl" at The Hour Theatre.

== Theater ==
Year	Play	Role	Theater	Director
2025	Who Do You Think You Are	May	Habima	Gamma Fried
2024	Mary Stewart	Hannah Kennedy	Habima	Eldar Gohar Groisman
2022	Minyan Women	Adina	Habima	Lilach Segal
2022	Talk About the Place of Finding	Whistle	Habima	Aya Kaplan
2022	And What Is a Trip		Habima	Lahav Timor
2022	Masada 1942	Nora	Habima	Moshe Captain
2019	Cause of Death Unknown	Deliah	Habima	Hanan Snir
2018	King Lear	Cordelia	Habima	Gadi Roll
2016	Alone in Berlin	Eva Kluge the Postman	Habima	Ilan Ronen
2015	The Abduction from the Monastery	Goethe	The Hour	Roei Segev
2015	To the End of the Land	Ibtisam	Cameri Theatre/Habima	Hanan Snir
2014	The Miser	Elise	Habima	Ilan Ronen
2013	Mother of the House	Eti	Habima	Alon Ophir
2013	Hear My Voice	Anna	Israeli Time Theater	Gadi Tsedaka
2012	The Merchant of Venice	Nerissa	Habima	Ilan Ronen
2011	Good Girl	Tami	Israeli Time Theater	Tom Schwartzberg
2010	Dance and Fly	Ella	Habima	Alon Ophir
2009	August Osage County	Jonah	Habima	Ilan Ronen
2008	Crazy	Yana	Habima	Yaeli Ronen
2008	The Dispute	Agela	Habima	Sigal Avin
2007	To Myself	Batya	The Kibbutz	Nir Erez
2007	Romeo and Juliet	Juliet	Tmu-na Theater	Dafna Rubinstein, Tal Brenner, Ido Shaked
2006	Witchcraft	Anonymous	The Camry	Yaeli Ronen
2005	Happy New Year to Farmers in the North	Marina	American Zionist House	Yaeli Ronen

== Filmography ==
=== Films ===
Year	Film	Role	Director	Screenplay
2006	Someone to Run With	Mine	Oded Davidoff	Noah Stallman
2007	The Band's Visit	Yola	Eran Kolirin	
2010	The Wanderer	The Matchmaking	Avishai Sivan	
2011	Testimony	The Bride	Shlomi Elkabetz	
2026	Unfortunately I Love You	Anna	Shahar Rosen	

=== TV shows ===
Series	Role	Director	Script	Year
All mothers lie	Ziva	Atara Frish	Noam Nevo, Natalie Michaelashvili, Dror Yael Katz	2026
Cramel	Emilia	Roy Segev	Roy Segev Shirili Deshe	2025
Mother's Day	Ofer	Eitan Tzur	Daniela London Dekel	2014
Blue Natalie	Dana	Oded Lotan	Guy Sidis, Avner Bernheimer	2010
Pillars of Smoke	Maayan	Oded Davidoff	Noah Stollman	2008
Screenz	Ozi	Eitan Aner	Eldad Ziv	2007
The Champion	Inbal	Shai Kapon	Sigal Avin, Dror Nobleman	2006

== Awards and nominations ==
- 2013 - "Best Actress" award at the Haifa International Children's Theatre Festival for her role in the play Sorrowful Song at The Hour Theatre.
- 2011/2012 - "Best Supporting Actress" award at the Children and Youth Stage Award for her role in the play Good Girl at The Hour Theatre.
- 2009 - "Promising Actress" award at the Israel Theatre Award for her role in the play Crazy at the Habima Theatre.
- 2008 - Nominee for the Ophir Award as a supporting actress in the film The Band’s Visit
- 2007 – Nominee for the Ophir Award as a supporting actress in the film Someone to Run With
