= Bar Belfer =

Israeli journalist and actress (1989–2026)

- בר בלפר
- Born: January 26, 1989
- Died: November 8, 2026 (aged 37)
- Occupations: Actress, musician, radio announcer
- Notable work: Someone to Run With
- Awards: Israeli Television Academy Award

Bar Belfer (Hebrew: בר בלפר; January 26, 1989 – November 8, 2026) was an Israeli actress, musician, and radio announcer.

Belfer made her film debut in the 2006 thriller Someone to Run With, directed by Oded Davidoff and based on the novel by David grossman. She was nominated for an Ophir Award for her performance in the film, which was later adapted into a television miniseries that earned her an Israeli Television Academy Award. Also, her performance won her the Special Grand Jury Mention in Miami International Film Festival.

In 2007, she joined the IDF as a radio reporter and editor. In 2010, while working roadside on her disabled car, she was struck and severely injured by another; her ability to walk and speak was impaired, and she also suffered from amnesia. After her months-long recovery and rehabilitation, she returned to her acting career.

Belfer married Shahar Cohen in 2018, and they have one daughter.

Belfer died from an epileptic seizure on November 8, 2026, at the age of 37.
