= Atlantica (disambiguation) =

Atlantica may refer to:

- Atlantica, an ancient continent
- Atlantica (gastropod), genus of land snails in the family Discidae
- Atlantica-1, a submarine telecommunications cable system linking the US, Bermuda, Venezuela and Brazil
- Atlántica (magazine), a magazine about art published in the Canary Islands
- Atlantica Online, an online game
- Atlantica, the eleventh stage in Gaiapolis.
- Atlantica, a Need for Speed III: Hot Pursuit track.
- Wingco Atlantica, a prototype aircraft
- Atlantica, a fictional undersea kingdom in the 1989 Disney animated film The Little Mermaid
- Atlantica Sustainable Infrastructure, a British company
- Atlantica, 2015 Israel comedy-drama TV series by screenwriter Noah Stollman.
