= Settler (disambiguation) =

A settler is a person who has migrated, who takes up residence on land and cultivates it, as opposed to a nomad.

Settler or settlers may also refer to:

== Books ==
- The Settlers (novel), a Swedish novel by Vilhelm Moberg
- The Settlers, Canadian novel, published in 1844 by Frederick Marryat
- The Settlers, an American novel set in Palestine, by Meyer Levin in 1972
- Settlers: The Mythology of the White Proletariat, 1983 book by J. Sakai

== Film and TV ==
- The Settlers (2016 film), an Israeli documentary film directed by Shimon Dotan
- The Settlers (2023 film), an internationally co-produced Western drama film directed by Felipe Gálvez Haberle
- Settlers (film), a 2021 film by Wyatt Rockefeller
- Louis Theroux: The Settlers, a 2025 documentary by British-American documentarian Louis Theroux

== Games ==
- The Settlers of Catan, a German board game also known as simply Settlers
- The Settlers (video game series), a video game series
  - The Settlers (1993 video game), the first game in the series
  - The Settlers DS, a Nintendo DS video game
  - The Settlers HD, a portable video game
  - The Settlers (2020 video game)

== Music ==
- The Settlers (band), a British folk band of the 1960s and early 70s

== Other ==
- Israeli settlers, civilians who moved to lands occupied by Israel in the 1967 Six-Day War

== See also ==
- The Settlers (disambiguation)
- Settler Swahili, a Swahili pidgin
- Charles Carroll the Settler (1661–1720), lawyer and planter in colonial Maryland
- Settling, the process where particulates settle to the bottom of a liquid
