= The Settlers (disambiguation) =

The Settlers is a video game series.

There are three games in the series with the same title:

- The Settlers (1993 video game), the first game in the series
- The Settlers DS, a 2007 port of The Settlers II
- The Settlers HD, a 2009 port of The Settlers IV

The Settlers may also refer to:

- The Settlers (2016 film), an Israeli documentary
- The Settlers (2023 film), a revisionist Western
- Louis Theroux: The Settlers, a 2025 British television documentary film
- The Settlers (band), an English folk/pop band
- The Settlers (novel), a 1956 Emigrants novel by Vilhelm Mobe
- The Settlers, a 1972 novel by Meyer Levin

== See also ==
- Settler (disambiguation)
