= Yaakov Rosner =

Israeli photographer (1902–1950)

Yaakov Rosner יעקב רוזנר
- Born: 1902; Munich, Germany
- Died: 1950 (aged 47–48)
- Known for: Photography
- Movement: Israeli art
- Spouse(s): Margot Klausner, m. 1926

Yaakov "Jack" Rosner (Hebrew: יעקב רוזנר; 1902 in Munich – 1950) was an Israeli photographer.

== Biography ==
Born in Munich, Rosner became aware of his Jewish background following antisemitic incidents at his school, leading him to become an active Zionist. He became a leader of the Zionist youth group Blau-Weiss (Blue and White) in Munich. He achieved a degree in economics at the University of Frankfurt, and briefly worked for the newspaper Frankfurter Zeitung. In 1926, he married Margot Klausner in Berlin, and they spent six months on honeymoon in Eretz Israel.

In 1926-27 he traveled to the United States to study advertising, where he met Alfred Stieglitz, who would become a great influence on his work. In 1928, Klausner and Rosner took part in the moving of Habima Theatre from Moscow to Tel Aviv. After moving to Israel, an affair developed between Klausner and Joshua Brandstetter, and she and Rosner divorced in the 1930s.

Rosner made aliyah in 1936, and started a new family in Tel Aviv. He served as a photographer for the Jewish National Fund.

== Style ==
Yaakov Rosner was a pioneering Israeli photographer who documented early Land of Israel events. Rosner developed a style which was a cross of sorts between documentary and staged photography. The subjects in these photographs were always handsome, strong, happy, and hard-working. When reality was incongruent with the expectations, it was staged in a pseudo-documentary fashion.

== Gallery ==
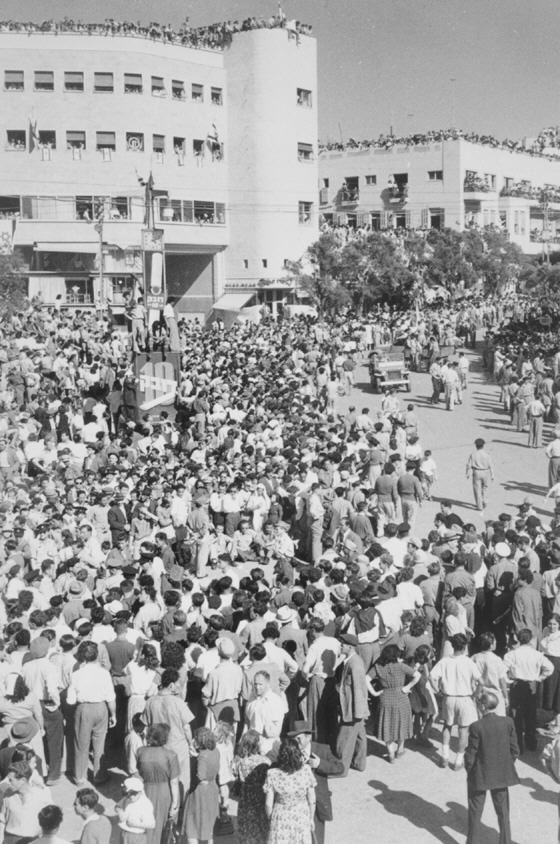
30 November 1947: Mugrabi Square in Tel Aviv, crowds celebrate the announcement on 29 November United Nations General Assembly decision to end the British Mandate in the Land of Israel

== Education ==
- 1926–27 US, with photographer Alfred Stieglitz

== Exhibitions ==
- 1991 "Yaakov Rosner 1930–1950", Israel Museum, Jerusalem
- 2006 Haifa in the Eye of the Camera – The First Half of the 20th Century, Haifa City Museum
