= Bar joke =

Jokes about someone walking into a tavern

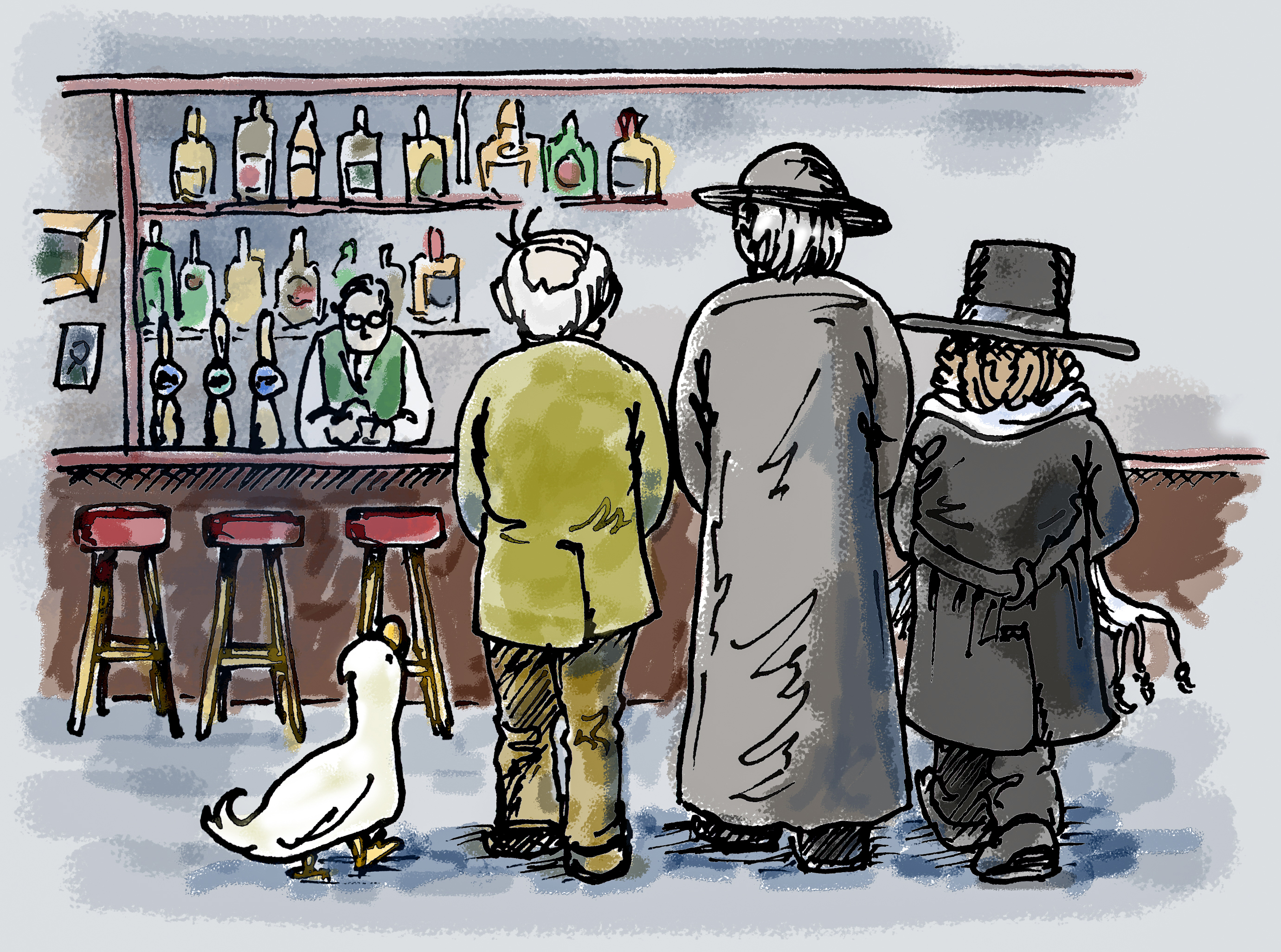
A priest, a rabbi, a minister and a duck walk into a bar...

A bar joke is a type of joke cycle that usually begins with some variant of the line "A man walks into a bar..."

== First recorded example ==
The earliest known example of a bar joke is Sumerian, appearing in the form of two slightly different versions of a proverb inscribed alongside many others on two clay tablets excavated at Nippur at the end of the 19th century. The tablets were etched around 1700 BCE, during the Old Babylonian Empire, although Edmund I. Gordon, who published the first translation of most of the proverbs inscribed on these tablets, argued that the proverbs themselves probably date from a considerably earlier period.

Scholars differ on how best to translate the proverb from Sumerian. According to Gordon's translation, the proverb reads: "A dog, having entered an inn, did not see anything, (and so he said): 'Shall I open this (door)?'" The Assyriologist Seraina Nett provides a slightly different translation, suggesting that the proverb be read as "A dog entered into a tavern and said, 'I cannot see anything. I shall open this', or 'this one'".

The meaning behind the proverb is also subject to debate among scholars. Gordon suggested that the inn also apparently served as a brothel (he notes that the word used in the proverb for inn or tavern, "éš-dam", can also be translated as "brothel", and it was common in ancient Mesopotamia for prostitution to take place in these establishments), and thus "the dog wanted to see what was 'going on behind closed doors'". Nett suggests that the punchline could be a pun that is incomprehensible to modern readers, or a reference to some figure who was well known at the time but similarly unfamiliar to modern readers. Gonzalo Rubio, another Assyriologist, cautions that this ambiguity ultimately means it is simply not possible to definitely categorize the proverb as a joke, though he and other scholars like Nett do point to the recurring use of innuendo in such proverbs as indicating that many were indeed intended to be humorous.

== Examples ==
An iconic version of the joke begins "A horse walks into a bar", with a punchline where the horse's arrival is not regarded as unusual (e.g., "The bartender asks, 'Why the long face?'"). This form of the bar joke may have roots in humorous accounts of real events from the Old West. Moreover, this variation is highly recognizable as a staple of traditional comedy sketches. For example, it is used as the title of A Horse Walks into a Bar by David Grossman, a dark novel about a comedian's failing mental state.

Another version involves several men walking into the bar together, often with related professions, such as a priest, a minister and a rabbi. In effect, this is a merger between the "bar joke" and trio jokes involving priests, ministers and rabbis (or Englishmen, Irishmen and Scotsmen) in other settings. This form has become so well known that it is the subject of at least one joke about the popularity of the joke itself: "A priest, a minister, and a rabbi walk into a bar. The bartender looks at them and says, 'What is this, a joke?'".

According to Scott McNeely in the Ultimate Book of Jokes, the first bar joke was published in 1952 in The New York Times.

== Variants ==
Variations on the bar joke include puns or wordplay (e.g., "A panda walks into a bar; it eats, shoots and leaves"), or inanimate objects (e.g. "a sandwich walks into a bar, orders a beer, and is told by the bartender, we don't serve food here").

A variant about a duck asking for grapes became the inspiration for viral hit "The Duck Song" by Bryant Oden.

A variant involves a literal interpretation of the joke's setup, wherein the punchline is that the person says "ouch" (i.e. they walked into a horizontal pole).

== See also ==
- Bellman joke
