= A Horse Walks into a Bar =

Novel by Israeli author David Grossman

- First edition
- Author: David Grossman
- Original title: סוס אחד נכנס לבר Sus echad nichnas lebar
- Translator: Jessica Cohen
- Genre: Fiction
- Set in: Netanya, Israel
- Published: 2014 (Tel Aviv: Ha'kibbutz Ha'meuchad), Hebrew; 10 November 2016 (London: Jonathan Cape), English
- Media type: Print, digital
- Pages: 194 (first English edition)
- Awards: 2017 Man Booker International Prize
- ISBN: 978-1-910-70293-2 (first English edition)
- OCLC: 961902309
- Preceded by: Falling Out of Time
- Website: A Horse Walks into a Bar, penguin.co.uk

A Horse Walks into a Bar (Hebrew: סוס אחד נכנס לבר, romanized: Sus Echad Nechnas LeBar) is a novel by Israeli author David Grossman. First published in Hebrew in 2014 by Ha'kibbutz Ha'meuchad as Sus echad nichnas lebar, the book was translated into English by Jessica Cohen, and published in the UK by Jonathan Cape in November 2016 and in the US by Alfred A. Knopf in February 2017. The title is derived from a common bar joke. (Note: A horse walks into a bar. The bartender says, 'Why the long face?')

Set in a stand-up comedy show in Israel that takes place over just two hours, the novel recounts the tale of a comic who faces a personal crisis while performing his routine, leading to a series of candid and chilling revelations about his past.

The novel won the 2017 Man Booker International Prize. The judges said they had been "bowled over by Grossman's willingness to take emotional as well as stylistic risks".

== Plot ==
A Horse Walks into a Bar is narrated by a retired district court judge, Avishai Lazar, who is invited out of the blue by a local comedian to attend his show, a stand-up routine in a bar in the Israeli coastal town of Netanya. The judge and the comedian, 57-year-old Dovaleh Greenstein, who trades on divisive and offensive jokes, knew each other as boys, but have had no contact for over 40 years.

Lazar asks Greenstein what the point is of the invitation. "I want you to look at me," Greenstein tells him. "I want you to see me, really see me, and then afterward tell me." "Tell you what?" asks Lazar. "What you saw," Greenstein replies.

Greenstein is haunted by past decisions that detrimentally affected his close personal relationships, and he is in a state of deterioration while performing.

== Critical reception ==
Michael Schaub noted how the novel saw Grossman taking many risks, with "every one of them pay[ing] off spectacularly well", and praised the author's timing in the novel, which transpires over only two hours. The Guardian described the work as an "unexpected delight", declaring that Grossman had written "a novel for our new Age of Offence", given the propensity of people to easily take offence. Meanwhile, the New York Times stated that Grossman "has left a trail of blood and sweat on the page that only a true master – a Lenny Bruce, a Franz Kafka – could dream of replicating". NPR described the novel as "unsettling and mesmerizing", noting the novel's candid elocution as "not as much about comedy as it is about witness".

The translation won the 2017 Man Booker International Prize, with Grossman and Cohen sharing the £50,000 (US$68,493) prize winnings. The award was shared in accordance with the altered rules of the prize, which grant equal credit to the author and the translator.

== Adaptations ==
In August 2019, Village Roadshow Pictures optioned the rights to the novel to adapt into a feature film, to be co-produced with Veritas Entertainment. In May 2020, Mark Duplass was announced to direct the film.

The novel has been adapted for stage. In March 2023, a production starring Bulgarian-German actor Samuel Finzi was presented at the national theatre in Sofia, Bulgaria.
