= The Book of Intimate Grammar =

1991 novel by David Grossman

- Author: David Grossman
- Original title: ספר הדקדוק הפנימי
- Language: Hebrew
- Genre: Bildungsroman
- Publication date: 1991
- Publication place: Israel

The Book of Intimate Grammar (Hebrew: ספר הדקדוק הפנימי, romanized: Sefer HaDikduk HaPenimi) by David Grossman was released in 1991. This book is a Bildungsroman that recounts the story of Aron Kleinfeld's life from ages eleven to fifteen in a poor area of Jerusalem.

== Plot ==
The story takes place in the neighborhood of Beit HaKerem, Jerusalem in the 1960s. It explores Aron's internal struggles as well as his convoluted relationships. Aron is introduced as a dreamer and a leader to his friends in make-believe games. However, as time goes on, his parents and his friends begin to shame him for his lack of physical and mental maturity. His parents are ashamed of his physical shortcomings and his school friends grew tired of his childish imagination.

Aron's relationship with his parents only becomes more strained as he approaches his Bar-Mitzva (a Jewish coming of age ritual for boys). His mother, in an attempt to convince herself that Aron has grown more than he really has, makes Aron wear thick socks to create an illusion that his feet have grown. Initially, Aron glorifies his physical condition and scorns adults for losing their individuality, but he shortly becomes depressed due to his inability to live up to his mother's expectations. In Aron's point of view, the world of adults is disloyal, full of troubles and dull. He refuses to grow up, maintains his integrity and avoids acting like an adult in order to escape puberty.
