= M. J. Kang =

Canadian playwright and actress

- Born: Seoul, South Korea
- Occupations: Playwright, actress

M.J. Kang is a Canadian and American playwright and actress.

== Early life and education ==
Born in Seoul, South Korea, Kang immigrated to Toronto, Ontario with her family at the age of two. She studied with the Playwrights Unit at Toronto's Tarragon Theatre. She is the first Korean-Canadian playwright to be professionally produced on Canadian stages.

== Career ==
Kang's plays include Noran Bang: The Yellow Room, Blessings dreams of blonde & blue. and Questioning Condoms, She received a Dora Mavor Moore Award nomination for Outstanding New Play, Independent Theatre Division in 1998 for Noran Bang: The Yellow Room.

As an actress, Kang had a regular role in the 1997 television series Riverdale, recurring guest starring roles on Star Wars: Skeleton Crew, Gangnam Project, Seal Team, and made guest appearances in E.N.G., Earth: Final Conflict, The City, Doc, Strong Medicine and Medium. On stage, she has performed in productions of Jean Yoon's The Yoko Ono Project, Laurie Fyffe's The Malaysia Hotel and Oren Safdie's Private Jokes, Public Places. She has performed in productions of Private Jokes, Public Places in Toronto, New York City, London, Los Angeles and Berkeley, California.

== Filmography ==
=== Film ===
Year	Title	Role	Notes
1993	TC 2000	Sumai's Daughter	
1994	PCU	Physics Major	
2002	The Book of Eve	Student	
2003	Owning Mahowny	Secretary	

=== Television ===
Year	Title	Role	Notes
1992	E.N.G.	Kid #1	Episode: "To Kill with Kindness"
1997	Riverdale	Becky Snow	24 episodes
1998	Earth: Final Conflict	Bartender	Episode: "The Joining"
1999	The City	Lisa	Episode: "Joy Ride: Part II"
2000	D.C.	Young Lawyer	Episode: "Pilot"
2001	The Wandering Soul Murders	Girl in diner	Television film
2001	Nero Wolfe	Cherry Quon	Episode: "Christmas Party"
2001	Doc	Receptionist	2 episodes
2005	Strong Medicine	Huan Yuen	Episode: "Dying Inside"
2006	Medium	Technician	Episode: "A Changed Man"
2020–2021	Extreme Improv: Revenge	Various roles	4 episodes
2021	SEAL Team	Kwan Jon-Wi	2 episodes
2023-25	Gangnam Project	Sandra Yim	8 episodes
2024–2025	Star Wars: Skeleton Crew	Garree	4 episodes
