= Luke Whisnant =

American poet

- Born: 1957 (age 68–69)
- Education: East Carolina University (BA); Washington University in St. Louis (MFA)
- Occupations: Novelist; short story writer; poet

Luke Whisnant (born 1957) is an American novelist, short story writer and poet. His first novel, Watching TV with the Red Chinese, was published in 1992 and was made into a feature film in 2010. Street, a poetry chapbook, was published in 1990; Down in the Flood, a collection of short stories, appeared in 2006; and Above Floodstage, an 800-line narrative poem, was published in 2014. Whisnant earned his B.A. in English from East Carolina University and his M.F.A. in creative writing from Washington University in St. Louis. He is Professor of English at East Carolina University, where he also edits Tar River Poetry.

== Works ==
- Street. Portlandville NY: MAF Press, 1990. ISBN 978-1477490204
- Watching TV with the Red Chinese. Chapel Hill: Algonquin, 1992. ISBN 978-0-945575-83-2
- Down in the Flood. Knoxville: Iris, 2006. ISBN 978-0-916078-70-6
- Above Floodstage: A Narrative Poem. Georgetown KY: Finishing Line, 2014. ISBN 978-1-62229-635-4
