= Herzliya Studios =

Israeli media company

- Formerly: Israeli Film Studios Ltd. (1933–1942); Herzliya (1942–1957); Carmel-Herzliya (1957–1978)
- Type: Public
- Traded as: TASE: TAYA
- ISIN: IL0007960110
- Industry: Audiovisual; Broadcasting
- Incorporated: 1933
- Founded: 9 February 1933 (93 years ago)
- Founder: Margot Klausner
- Headquarters: Herzliya, Israel
- Services: Film production; Television production; Television distribution; Television broadcasting; Global sales
- Revenue: ▲ ₪4,825M (2019)
- Net income: ▲ ₪110,568M (2023)
- Total equity: ▼ ₪4,874M (29%) (2026)
- Parent: Taya Communications
- Divisions: International Department
- Subsidiaries: Givatayim Studios
- Website: Official website

Herzliya Studios Ltd. (Hebrew: אולפני הרצליה), officially known as the United Studios of Israel, is an Israeli television production company based in Herzliya, Israel. It is a full-service production company offering services in development, production, post-production, and broadcasting. The company also develops and supplies content for international television markets and provides multi-camera crew services, film production studios, control rooms, and broadcast trucks.

== History ==
Herzliya Studios Ltd. was founded by Margot Klausner, a pioneer of Hebrew and Israeli theater and film, under the name "Israeli Film Studios Ltd." In 1933, she established the production company "Ohrim" with her husband, Yehoshua Brandstatter. The company's first film, To a New Life, was filmed in Israel. Klausner aimed to establish production studios in Israel to build a strong, independent film industry.

In 1949, Klausner and her husband leased a 72-acre plot in Herzliya, owned by the Jewish National Fund. The cornerstone-laying ceremony for the studios took place on July 3, 1949. The founding document was supported by Brandstatter and Herzliya council head Ben-Zion Michaeli and was signed by General Yitzhak Sadeh and actress Hanna Rovina. Congratulatory telegrams were sent by Italian director Roberto Rossellini, author Thomas Mann, and executives from Metro-Goldwyn-Mayer and Paramount Pictures. With an initial investment of $5,000 from Klausner's inheritance and funds raised from investors, the company imported expensive film equipment into Israel.

During the construction of the studios, Klausner accumulated substantial debts and later admitted that she would have abandoned the project had she foreseen the difficulties. Furthermore, her partners eventually lost faith in the company and urged her to buy their shares or dissolve the partnership. She chose to purchase her partners' shares and stabilize the company.

In 1951, the first phase of the studios' construction was completed, costing one hundred thousand Israeli shekels for the building and $150,000 for purchasing equipment from abroad. Even before the completion of the facilities, the company produced two documentary films: The First Pioneers, which was shown at the Cannes Film Festival, and The Tent City, which was shown at the Venice Film Festival. Both films also screened in cinemas across Europe and the United States. Additionally, they began work on their first feature film, Two Thousand Years and Three More, written and directed by Baruch Diner. Brandstatter left the company and relinquished all his rights in the studios. Klausner remained the primary shareholder and manager.

In 1952, the company produced two short films: a musical, Harvest in Galilee, for the United Jewish Appeal, and a short feature film, Full Moon.

1954, they produced their first feature-length films: Stone on Every Mill directed by Arieh Laholah and Hill 24 Doesn't Answer directed by Thorold Dickinson.

In 1957, the "Carmel-Herzliya" partnership was formed to produce film newsreels. This merger combined Carmel Newsreel and Israeli Film Studios. Carmel Newsreels, owned by Nathan Axelrod, was operating at a loss, with each newsreel costing 3,000 Israeli shekels but earning only 1,000 shekels in revenue. Axelrod sought a partner to reduce production costs.

In 1963, Herzliya Studios produced Sallah Shabati. A film set recreating a refugee camp was constructed in a eucalyptus grove in Herzliya.

In 1967, Itzik Kol was appointed CEO of the studios by Klausner following the successful production of King Solomon and Solomon the Cobbler at the Habima Theatre, where Kol served as administrative manager. Klausner, who owned the rights to the play, was impressed by his abilities. Kol convinced Klausner to invest in television broadcasting equipment. During the Yom Kippur War, their broadcasting equipment became a hub for satellite broadcasts for television networks around the world.

In 1971, Herzliya Studios produced Johnny Cash's film The Way of Salvation: The Story of Jesus. In the 1970s, they produced several films, including Tzelet Blaumilch, Konilmel, Hole in the White Stone, The Azulai Policeman, I Love You Rosa, Hill 24 Doesn't Answer, Peeping Toms, and The Band.

During the 1970s, the studios increasingly focused on television program production while continuing to produce films. In 1973, the studios underwent an upgrade, adding color filming and broadcasting capabilities.

In 1978, Kol merged Herzliya Studios with Givatayim Studios to form "United Studios," where he served as CEO. Under his leadership, United Studios became Israel's largest production company for television programs and films.

In 1983, the company transitioned to PAL broadcasting standards due to some of the studios' equipment being refurbished from Canada, which uses NTSC. In the late 1980s, United Studios faced financial difficulties due to investments in equipment for Channel 2 (whose launch was delayed) and shareholder disputes. The company was sold to a group of investors, and subsequently, Menachem Golan signed a contract to purchase them, but the deal ultimately fell through at the last minute.

In 1994, the Channel 2 licensee "Reshet" established its central broadcast studio in the studio building. In 2006, "Reshet" left the studio building. In 1995, the studios were equipped with Sony digital cameras and routing systems. In 2000, the studios launched Israel's first digital broadcast truck, which was later upgraded to HD a decade later.

In 2002, United Studios Herzliya established additional studio and office facilities in the Te'el Center in Ra'anana. The Ra'anana studio operated for about ten years before closing.

In the 2010s, the studios, where some productions for Keshet 12, Reshet 13, and Kan 11 are filmed, upgraded their broadcasting equipment to HD.

=== Moving to Kfar Saba ===
In 2007, the owners of Herzliya Studios decided to sell the Herzliya complex as a residential neighborhood wanted to develop the area. They made a combination deal with developers who would build the complex in exchange for ownership of some of the residential apartments. In February 2008, "Africa Israel Housing" won the tender, offering to pay 43.5% of the sale price of the apartments in the complex. Later, "Tdahar" and businessman Amos Luzon joined the deal. However, the implementation of the tender was delayed for many years due to delays in approving the construction plan and finding an alternative location for the studios.

In 2016, Herzliya Studios acquired an 8.5-acre plot near Highway 4 and Kfar Saba's Green Neighborhood through a tender issued by the Kfar Saba municipality. In January 2019, the Central Planning and Construction Committee in the Central District approved a plan to construct a new media city for Herzliya Studios on this land. In November 2019, the plan was finally approved. The new facility was approved for 25,000 square meters of space for television studios, production offices, and a media-related vocational school, with a total investment of approximately 150 million shekels.

In July 2020, the deal for a residential neighborhood with 326 housing units on the Herzliya Studios site was finalized after receiving approval from the Israel Lands Authority. In August 2020, permission to excavate and lay foundations for the media city was granted, and construction commenced.

== Studio structure and layout ==
The studios are located in central Herzliya, spanning approximately 47 acres. They are characterized by low-rise, spacious architecture. The complex includes nine film studios, editing rooms, and sound stages. Within the studio grounds is Margot Klausner's home, formerly used by Keshet Broadcasting, which is now a visitor attraction called "The Magic Studio."

Herzliya Studios now operates the studio facilities of its former competitor, G.G. Israel Studios, in Neve Ilan, after G.G. Israel Studios was sold. Herzliya Studios operates three studios for Keshet Broadcasting.

== Departments and Services ==
- Content Development Department: Initiates, develops, and produces content in various formats, including talk shows, news programs, cooking shows, reality shows, children's and youth programming, drama series, game shows, animation, and commercials.
- Studios: The studio complex covers 44,000 square meters and houses nine television studios used for both recordings and live broadcasts. It also includes production offices, sets, and props for filming.
- Post-Production: The broadcast and post-production center comprises 30 advanced digital editing suites for standard or high-definition television, sound rooms, audio services, broadcast trucks, and crew support staff.
- New Media Department: Develops and produces content for online and mobile platforms.
- International Department: Promotes the studios internationally through distribution and sales of original productions, equipment rentals, and services to global companies. It also focuses on fostering development initiatives, foreign investment opportunities, collaborations, and adapting foreign formats for local production.
- Television Archive: Maintains an archive of recordings from Israel's early decades.
- Translation Services (Subtitling): Provides translation and subtitling services.

== Productions ==
=== Documentary Films ===
- Tears of the Sea (Director: Ron Kahlili, 1996)
- One Widow, Twice Bereaved (Director: Orna Ben-Dor, 2003)
- Mom, Tell Me (Director: Orna Ben-Dor, 2009)
- The Hebrew Sex Dictionary (Director: Elad Zaki, 2010)

=== Current Affairs Programs ===
- Orly and Guy (2011–2019)
- Keshet's Morning (2013–present)
- Five Original (2017)
- Six Economic (2017)
- Seven Current Affairs (2017)
- Morning News (2017–present)
- Sunrise (2016–2019)
- Oprah and Bar Kovitz (2017–2024)
- Oprah and Levinson (2024–present)

=== Variety/Entertainment Programs ===
- Mistakes (1994–2008)
- Night Butterfly (1997–2000)
- Dangerous Relationships (1999–unknown)
- Wonderful Country (2004–present)
- Seeking Love (2007–2008)
- Tinopeht (2008–2009)
- Schulz (2008–2010)
- See You (2010–2015)
- Who Wants to Be a Millionaire? (1999–2007)
- Flashback (2010–unknown)
- The Golden Cage (2013–2014)
- Shi on Friday (2013)
- Ambush (2013)
- Love Over Fire (2014)
- See Who's Asking (2015–present)
- The Back of the Nation (2015–2020)
- Din and Angel (2020–present)
- That's It! (Unified seasons, 2020–present)
- Back to Mistakes (2022)

=== Series ===
- Love Around the Corner (2003–2005)
- Love Hurts (2004)
- Pick Up (2005)
- Grass Legend (2006–2007)
- Maybe This Time (2007–2008)
- Everything is Honey (2007–2010)
- Loving Anna (2008–2010)
- Pillars of Smoke (2009–2011)
- PoliShuk (2009–2015)
- The Pilots' Wives (2009–2010)
- We Live Here Happily (2010–2012)
- Lights and Shadows (2011)
- Golden Girls (2011–2016)
- Israel (2013)
- Empire's Threads (2014–2015)
- Atlantica (2015)
- Stage Animals (2015–2016)
- La Familia (2015–2019)
- TAAGD (2016–present)
- The Exchange Principle (2016–present)
- Juda (2017–present)
- A Good Lesson for Life (2020–present)

=== Children's/Youth Programs ===
- Musikh (1993–1994)
- Half a Family (1998–2001)
- Iptsi and Diptsi (2001–2002)
- Big Head (2004–2017)
- Galileo (2010–present)
- School for Wizards (2010–2013)
- Yoni and the Gifted Ones (2011)
- Sstah! (2012–2013)
- Max and Moza (2012)
- The Diggers (2014–present)
- Stage Animals (2015–2016)
- Grains (2016–present)
- Under the Skin (2018–present)
- Lost in the Square (2018–present)

=== Formats Sold to Foreign Countries ===
- Share or Dare
- Who's Asking?
- Push Up
- Can You Face It
- House Call
- Shuttle Battle
- Dress Up
- The Hitchhiker
