= Shimon Dotan =

- שמעון דותן
- Born: 23 December 1949 (age 75); Periș, Ilfov County, Romania

Shimon Dotan (Hebrew: שמעון דותן; born 23 December 1949) is an Israeli film director, screenwriter, and producer.

== Biography ==
=== Early life ===
Shimon Dotan was born in Romania in 1949 and moved to Israel in 1959. He grew up in Moshav Arugot, an agricultural cooperative. He then served five years in the Israeli military as a Navy Seal and went on to get his BFA at Tel Aviv University, where his student films won Israel’s Best Short Film and Best Director Awards twice.

=== Career ===
Dotan is the recipient of numerous awards including, the Special Jury Prize for Best World Documentary Feature at Sundance Film Festival (Hot House), Silver Bear for Best Actor at Berlin Film Festival (Smile of the Lamb), Best Film Award at Newport Beach Film Festival (You Can Thank Me Later), two times winner of Israeli Academy Award for Best Film and Best Director (Repeat Dive, Smile Of The Lamb) and others.

Dotan’s feature films have received both critical acclaim and commercial success. His debut writing/directing/producing effort, Repeat Dive (1982), which chronicles Dotan’s own experiences as a member of Israel’s elite Navy Commando unit, won three Israeli Academy Awards, including Best Picture and Best Director, and was selected for the official competition at the Berlin and Chicago Film Festivals. He followed that effort with two quasi-documentaries, Souvenirs from Tel Aviv and Souvenirs from Hebron (1982).

His 1986 feature film The Smile of the Lamb, written and directed by Dotan and co-produced with Yonatan Aroch, won numerous awards including the Silver Bear for Best Actor at Berlin and six Israeli Academy Awards, including those for Best Director and Best Picture. In 1991, Dotan wrote and directed The Finest Hour starring Rob Lowe, Tracy Griffith and Gale Hanson.

After moving to Montreal, Canada in 1991 Dotan co-founded Cinequest Films Inc. together with partner Netaya Anbar. In 1994 Dotan directed and produced Warriors, starring Macha Grenon, Gary Busey and Michael Pare. In 1996 Dotan directed and produced Coyote Run, starring Peter Greene, Macha Grenon and Michael Pare. The critically acclaimed You Can Thank Me Later (1999), was produced together with Anbar and directed by Dotan in 1999 and starred Ellen Burstyn, Genevieve Boujold, Amanda Plummer and Mary McDonnell. It was awarded Best Film at Newport Beach Film Festival, selected for the closing night at the Palm Springs Film Festival and had its opening gala at the Montreal World Film Festival. In 1999–2000 Dotan produced The List (1999) with Ryan O’Neal, Rock Lafortune and Ben Gazara, Cause of Death (2000) with Maxim Roy, Patrick Bergin and Michael Ironside and Wilder (2000) with Pam Grier, Romano Orzari and Rutger Hauer. In 2001 Dotan produced Hidden Agenda with Dolph Lundgren and Maxim Roy. In 2003 Dotan co-wrote the script for Watching TV with the Red Chinese together with Netaya Anbar and in 2005 he wrote Frenzy based on a novel by David Grossman. In 2006 Dotan wrote, directed and co-produced the documentary/feature Hot House. It won the Special Jury Award for Best World Documentary at Sundance. In 2007 Dotan produced and co-directed the Canadian-Chinese coproduction Diamond Dogs with Dolph Lundgren.

In 2012, together with Netaya Anbar, Dotan wrote, directed, and produced Watching TV with the Red Chinese based on the novel by Luke Whisnant.

In 2016 Dotan wrote and directed The Settlers, produced by Estelle Fialon, Jonatan Aroch, Paul Cadieux, and Dotan.

Dotan has taught political cinema at the Arthur L. Carter Journalism Institute of New York University since 2003. He also teaches at The New School in New York City. He has previously taught at Tel Aviv University and at Concordia University in Montreal. He is a Fellow of the New York Institute for the Humanities.

== Selected filmography ==
- Repeat Dive (Tzlila Chozeret), Writer/Director/Producer (1982)
- The Smile of the Lamb, Writer/Director/Producer (1986)
- The Finest Hour, Writer/Director (1992)
- Warriors, Director/Producer (1994)
- Coyote Run, Director/Producer (1996)
- You Can Thank Me Later, Director/Producer (1998)
- Hot House, Writer/Director/Producer (2006)
- Diamond Dogs, Co-director/Producer (2007)
- Watching TV with the Red Chinese, Writer/Director/Producer (2012)
- The Settlers, Writer/Director/Producer (2016)

== Awards and honors ==
- New York Film Festival, Official Selection, The Settlers (2016)
- Sundance Film Festival, Official Selection, The Settlers (2016)
- DocAviv Film Festival, Special Mention, The Settlers (2016)
- Sheffield International Documentary Festival, Special Mention, The Settlers (2016)
- Cullman Fellowship Award for Scholars and Writers at the NY Public Library (2013)
- Guggenheim Fellowship Award (2012)
- President of the Jury at the Jerusalem Film Festival (2010)
- President of the Jury at the Bucharest International Film Festival (2009)
- Sundance Film Festival Special Jury Prize for Hot House (2007)
- Lincoln Center, Israeli Cinema Retrospective, The Smile of the Lamb & Repeat Dive, (2000)
- Montreal World Film Festival, Special Gala Screening, You Can Thank Me Later (1999)
- Newport Beach Film Festival, Best Feature Film, You Can Thank Me Later (1999)
- Palm Springs Film Festival, Closing Night, You Can Thank Me Later (1999)
- Berlin Film Festival, Silver Bear, The Smile of the Lamb (1986)
- Six Israeli Academy Awards (including Best Film, Best Director), The Smile of the Lamb (1986)
- Berlin Film Festival, Official Selection, Repeat Dive (1982)
- Chicago International Film Festival, Official Selection, Repeat Dive (1982)
- Three Israeli Academy Awards (including Best Film, Best Director), Repeat Dive (1982)
