= Pillars of Smoke =

Israeli television series

- תמרות עשן; Timrot Ashan
- Genre: Mystery; Horror; Surrealism
- Created by: Oded Davidoff; Noah Stollman
- Screenplay by: Noah Stollman
- Starring: Efrat Ben-Zur; Yoram Toledano; Tzachi Grad; Shai Avivi; Eliana Shechter; Yair Lehman; Matan Andeiger; Raida Adon; Gera Sandler; Yonatan Hashiloni; Neta Porat; Marina Maximilian Blumin; Erez Driges; Rinat Matatov; Tzachi Hanan
- Music by: Avi Belleli
- Opening theme: Avi Belleli's guitar cover of "Sdot Goldberg" by Meir Ariel
- Country of origin: Israel
- Original language: Hebrew
- No. of seasons: 2
- No. of episodes: 18

Production
- Production locations: Golan Heights, Merom Golan
- Production company: Herzliya Studios

Original release
- Network: HOT
- Release: 4 January 2009 – 23 December 2011

Pillars of Smoke (Hebrew: תמרות עשן, Timrot Ashan) is an Israeli mystery/drama/thriller TV series aired on HOT 3 TV channel during 2009–2011. It was created by Oded Davidoff and Noah Stollman and produced by Herzliya Studios.

The members of a (fictional) kibbutz Timrot Ashan in Golan Heights mysteriously disappear overnight. A young police investigator specializing in cults, is sent to join the Northern Golan Command to investigate the case.

In 2011 NBC acquired rights of production, but their remake was cancelled.

== Plot ==
The plot is set in the northern Golan Heights, where all the members of the fictional kibbutz, Timrot Ashan, vanish mysteriously overnight right under the noses of the local police and the regional military command. This disappearance, however, does not come as a complete surprise to the authorities, who were well aware of the reclusive lifestyle of the kibbutz members. The 36 members were followers of a spiritual leader named Avraham Orion, known as "Tzelem Enosh" (Human Form), who recruited them from yoga seminars and convinced them to abandon their daily lives to establish an innovative kibbutz. Initially, the members limited the entry of outsiders, eventually banning all guests from the kibbutz grounds entirely.

The series opens when a mail carrier in the northern Golan Heights arrives at the kibbutz gates only to find the community deserted. Various theories regarding the disappearance begin to circulate among the residents of the Golan. Leah Kafka, a young police investigator specializing in cults, is sent north to join the local command in investigating the case.

As the investigation unfolds, the secrets of both the kibbutz members and the local authorities bubble to the surface, accompanied by a sequence of mysterious occurrences. It is revealed that Assa Mokad, the local police commander, knows the settlement's secret and has acted to prevent its exposure through illegal and even violent means.

While Kafka and Naftali Shemesh (a local detective) uncover the settlement's secret, the Major General of the Northern Command discovers the nature of "Operation Shamir Worm." Kafka and Shemesh pursue Asa Mokad, whom they realize is responsible for the affair. Mokad outwits them repeatedly, betraying Shemesh's trust and leading them into an active military firing zone during a training exercise.

The first season ends with lingering mysteries and unanswered questions: Kafka is carried away in a body bag from the firing zone to the secret hiding place of the Timrot Ashan members, while the Major General is ordered to leave the Golan Heights due to his persistence in investigating the Geological Institute's connection to the case.

In the second season, the plot thickens into a large-scale conspiracy thriller where the lines between science, mysticism, and national security blur completely.

The season opens with the revelation that the members of the Timrot Ashan kibbutz were not kidnapped or vanished against their will; instead, they moved to a secret, isolated underground facility in the heart of the Golan Heights. It is revealed that their leader, Avraham Orion, is not just a spiritual guide but part of a complex military-scientific experiment involving the Geological Institute.

The season's big secret is that the cult members serve as "human detectors." Orion developed a theory that the human body can sense earthquakes and tectonic shifts before they occur. The cult members undergo a process of purification and consciousness alteration to become a living early-warning system for the state.

Leah Kafka, who was held captive by the cult, manages to escape and continues her pursuit alongside Naftali Shemesh. Shemesh, facing a profound crisis of trust following the betrayal of his former commander Asa Mokad, becomes even more determined to uncover the truth. The two realize that the disappearance was merely the tip of the iceberg of a government conspiracy.

Assa Mokad continues to manipulate both sides. No longer just a local police commander, he is revealed as the operative for "higher powers" intent on keeping the experiment secret at any cost. His relationship with Shemesh turns into a cat-and-mouse game, with Mokad consistently claiming that his terrible actions were meant to protect "something bigger" that the people of Israel are not ready to know.

As the investigation progresses, it is revealed that Operation Shamir Worm is related to an attempt to control the natural forces of the Golan Heights (volcanic activity and earthquakes) as a strategic weapon. The Geological Institute, backed by the military, established Timrot Ashan as a human laboratory.

The season reaches its climax when it becomes clear that the experiment has spiraled out of control. Avraham Orion begins to believe in his own divine power beyond science, and the cult members undergo extreme psychological shifts. The series ends on an apocalyptic note:A significant earthquake occurs, confirming some of the experiment's underlying premises, and The connection between mysticism (the cult) and state mechanisms (the army and the Institute) remains open and unresolved, hinting that the establishment will do anything to cover up the events, even at the cost of sacrificing human lives.

The second season deepens the series' central question: Does the state have the right to use its citizens as subjects in the name of "national security," and where is the line between religious faith and clinical insanity?

== Awards ==
- 2009: Israeli Television Academy Awards:
  - Best Cinematography in a Drama Series (Yaron Sharaf)
  - Best Direction in a Drama Series (Oded Davidoff)
  - Special Effects and Video Art Award: Boaz Tamir, Avshalom Margolin, Benny Afer and Itai Bachar
