= The Smile of the Lamb =

1986 Israeli drama film by Shimon Dotan

- Directed by: Shimon Dotan
- Written by: Shimon Dotan; David Grossman
- Produced by: Jonathan Aroch
- Starring: Rami Danon
- Cinematography: Daniel Schneor
- Edited by: Netaya Anbar
- Music by: Ilan Virtzberg
- Release date: 1986
- Running time: 95 minutes
- Country: Israel
- Language: Hebrew

The Smile of the Lamb (Hebrew: חיוך הגדי, translit. Hiuch HaGdi) is a 1986 Israeli drama film directed by Shimon Dotan and based on a novel by David Grossman.

The film was entered into the 36th Berlin International Film Festival where Tuncel Kurtiz won the Silver Bear for Best Actor. Following its success at the festival, the film was picked up for international distribution across Europe and the United States.

== Plot ==
Israeli Defense Forces (IDF) soldiers enter the Palestinian village of Andal, led by the military governor, Lieutenant Colonel Katzman (Makram Khoury), his deputy, Major Shaffer (Danny Mugia), and the military doctor, Captain Uri Laniado (Rami Danon). They are greeted by the village elder and the villagers, and Uri delivers a speech expressing hope for cooperation. His speech is interrupted by shouts from an old man, Hilmi (Tuncel Kurtiz), who is considered insane. Uri approaches Hilmi, and the two exchange a long gaze, eventually becoming friends.

Hilmi lives in a cave outside the village. He tells Uri about his adopted son, Yazdi (Mohammad Dib). Yazdi's mother became pregnant out of wedlock, and Hilmi agreed to marry her and raise Yazdi to protect her from being killed. Yazdi participates in operations against the army, believing in violent resistance to the occupying forces. Hilmi's wife has died, and a mute girl, Najat, brings him food to the cave daily.

An IDF patrol is attacked on the outskirts of the village. The attackers escape, leaving behind a dead donkey. Katzman imposes a curfew on the village and places the donkey's carcass in the village center, demanding the attackers be handed over. Uri opposes this action and confronts Katzman and Shaffer. He attacks Shaffer, leading Katzman to place him under arrest.

Uri and Katzman were once close friends, having met when Uri was studying medicine in Italy. Uri's wife, Shosh (Iris Hoffman), is a guide at the Tel Aviv Museum of Art. Their relationship is strained; Shosh feels Uri is oblivious to this and constantly smiles a foolish smile she calls "the goat's smile." She begins an affair with Katzman, which Uri is aware of, further intensifying tensions between them.

In a clash with militants, three attackers are killed, including Yazdi. Uri is released from custody and visits the grieving Hilmi. Hilmi takes Uri hostage and demands that Katzman withdraw IDF forces from the occupied lands in exchange for Uri's release.

Katzman organizes a force to take control of the cave but ultimately decides to go alone with Hilmi's consent. A struggle ensues between Katzman and the armed Hilmi in the cave, during which a bullet accidentally fired from Hilmi's gun kills Uri.

== Cast ==
- Rami Danon as Laniado
- Iris Hoffman as Shosh
- Makram Khoury as Katzman
- Tuncel Kurtiz as Hilmi
- Dan Muggia as Sheffer
