= The Human Resources Manager =

2010 film

- Film poster
- Directed by: Eran Riklis
- Written by: A. B. Yehoshua (novel); Noah Stollman (script)
- Starring: Mark Ivanir
- Cinematography: Rainer Klausmann
- Edited by: Tova Asher
- Release date: 10 August 2010
- Running time: 103 minutes
- Country: Israel
- Languages: Hebrew, Romanian, English

The Human Resources Manager (Hebrew: שליחותו של הממונה על משאבי אנוש, translit. Shliḥuto shel Ha'Memuneh al Mash'abey Enosh) is a 2010 Israeli drama film directed by Eran Riklis. Its script was written by Noah Stollman, based on the 2006 novel A Woman in Jerusalem by A. B. Yehoshua. The film tells the story of a bakery's human-resources manager (unnamed, like most of the film's characters) who reluctantly travels to Eastern Europe to take the body of a deceased former employee, a recent immigrant to Israel, back to her family, in order to prevent a public-relations disaster for his company. The first half of the film is set in, and was filmed in, Jerusalem, while the second half was filmed in Romania, although the name of the country is never specified in the film.

== Plot ==
Yulia, a foreign worker from Eastern Europe who came to work in Israel, is murdered in a terrorist attack in Jerusalem. Her body remains unclaimed in the morgue. Based on her belongings, it becomes clear that she worked at a Jerusalem bakery (Berman's Bakery), and a journalist from a local Jerusalem newspaper (played by Guri Alfi) accuses the bakery of being indifferent to Yulia's fate. The owner of the bakery (Gila Almagor), known as "The Widow," instructs the human resources manager (Mark Ivanir) to take Yulia's body to her homeland for burial.

The film follows the journey of the human resources manager from Jerusalem to the deceased's hometown, until she is laid to rest. He is accompanied by the journalist, and in the destination country in Romania, they are joined by the deputy Israeli consul (Julian Negulesco), who is married to the consul (Rozina Cambos), and Yulia's young son (Noah Silver).

The film's plot faithfully mirrors that of the book. The main significant difference between the two is that in the book, the owner of the bakery is a man, "The Old Man," whereas in the film, it is a woman, "The Widow."

== Cast ==
- Mark Ivanir as The Human Resources Manager
- Reymond Amsalem as The Divorcee
- Gila Almagor as The Widow
- Noah Silver as The Boy
- Guri Alfi as The Weasel
- Irina Petrescu as The Grandmother
- Julian Negulesco as The Vice Consul
- Rozina Cambos as The Consul
- Bogdan E. Stanoevitch as The Ex-Husband
- Ofir Weil as The Morgue Worker
- Roni Koren as The Daughter
- Papil Panduru as The Driver
- Danna Semo as The Secretary
- Sylwia Drori as The Nun

== Awards ==
The film debuted at the Locarno International Film Festival, where it won the Audience Award.

It also won five Ophir Awards, for Best Film, Director, Screenplay, Supporting Actress (Rozina Cambos) and Soundtrack.

The film was also selected as the Israeli entry for the Best Foreign Language Film at the 83rd Academy Awards, but it did not make the final shortlist.
