= Jessica Cohen =

British-Israeli-American translator

Jessica Cohen (Hebrew: ג'סיקה כהן; born 1973) is a British-Israeli-American literary translator. Her translation of David Grossman's 2014 novel A Horse Walks Into a Bar was awarded the 2017 Man Booker International Prize.

== Biography ==
Cohen was born in Colchester, England to Stanley Cohen and Ruth Kretzmer in 1973. She moved with her family to Israel at the age of seven and went on to study English literature at the Hebrew University of Jerusalem. After moving to the United States with her husband in 1997, she studied Middle Eastern literature and languages at Indiana University.

Cohen has translated a number of Hebrew language books into English, including those by Nir Baram, David Grossman, Amir Gutfreund, Yael Hedaya, Ronit Matalon, Rutu Modan, Dorit Rabinyan, Tom Segev, Etgar Keret, and Nava Semel. She currently resides in Denver, Colorado.

At the awards ceremony for the 2017 Man Booker International Prize, Cohen announced that she would donate half of her share of the winnings to B’Tselem.

== Translations ==
- To the End of the Land, David Grossman (2010)
- Falling Out of Time, David Grossman (2014)
- A Horse Walks into a Bar, David Grossman (2017)
- All the Rivers, Dorit Rabinyan (2017)
- At Night's End, Nir Baram (2018)
- Dear Zealots: Letters from a Divided Land, Amos Oz (2018)
- And the Bride Closed the Door, Ronit Matalon (2019)
- Further Up the Path, Daniel Oz (2019)
- The Drive, Yair Assulin (2020)
- Selected Plays, I, II, III, Hanoch Levin (2020)
- Three, Dror Mishani (2020)
- More Than I Love My Life, David Grossman (2021)
- At Night's End, Nir Baram (2021)
- What Makes an Apple?, Amos Oz & Shira Hadad (2022)
- Conviction, Dror Mishani (2022)
- World Shadow, Nir Baram (2022)
- Professor Schiff's Guilt, Agur Schiff (2023)
- Stockholm, Noa Yedlin (2023)
- Every Wrinkle Has a Story, David Grossman (2024)
- The Hebrew Teacher, Maya Arad (2024)
- The Thinking Heart: On Israel and Palestine, David Grossman (2024)
