= Julius Klausner =

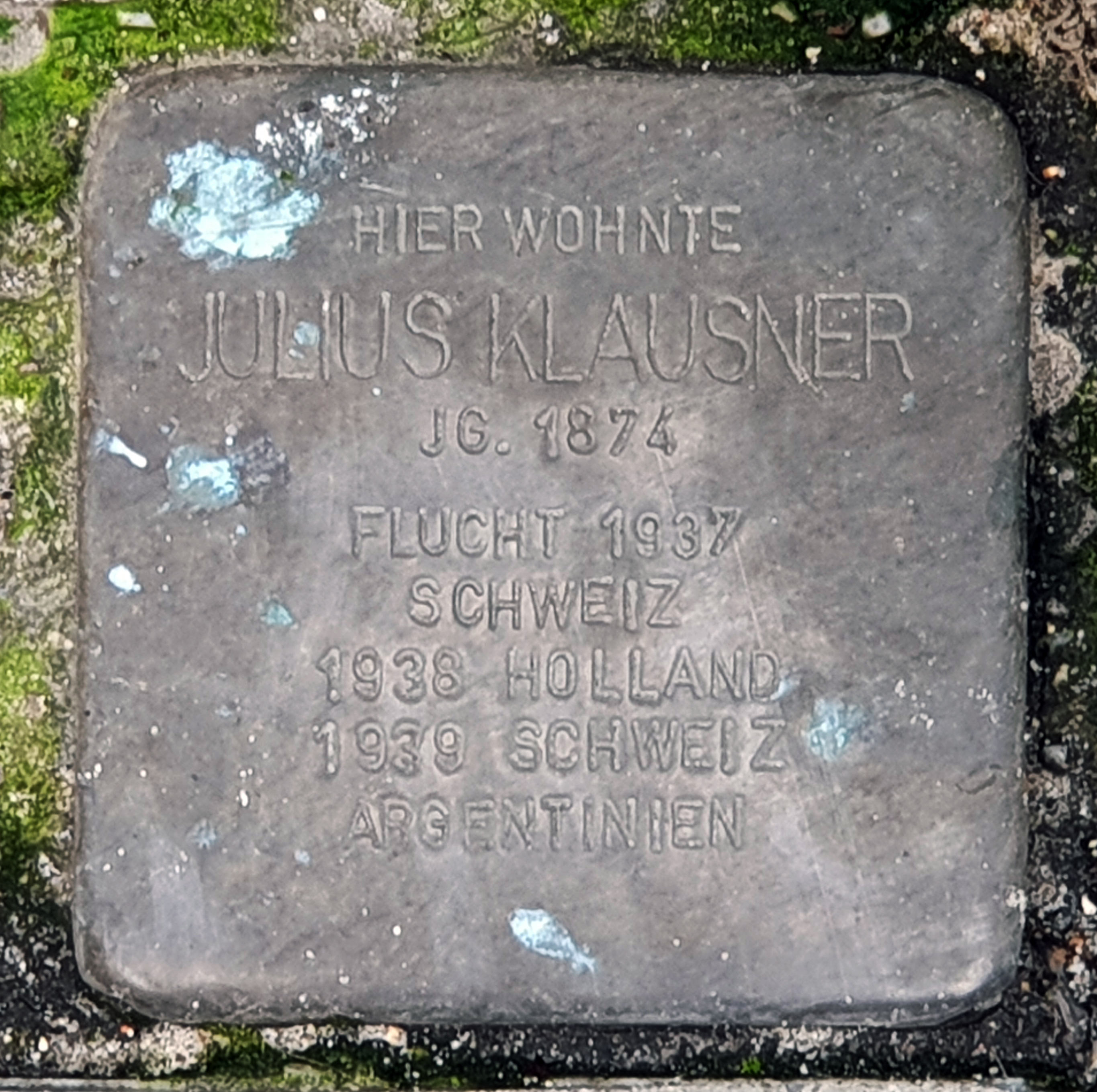
Commemorative stumbling stone at Fasanenstraße 83 in Berlin-Charlottenburg

Julius Klausner (born as Jehuda Klausner on March 10, 1874 in Tarnów, Galicia, Austria-Hungary; died on September 8, 1950 in Buenos Aires, Argentina) was the founder of the Leiser shoe company.

== Life ==
Klausner was born into a Jewish family in Galicia (Lesser Poland). His father was Jakob Klausner. Julius (Jehuda) had six siblings, and several were involved in the textile trade and departments stores in Germany. His brother Otto Klausner also became a shoe merchant (Bottina). He grew up in Tarnów, lived briefly in Vienna and came to Berlin in 1889.

In 1891, he founded a shoe store in Oranienstraße in Berlin-Kreuzberg with his uncle Hermann Leiser. From 1898, he was the sole owner after marrying Leiser's daughter Dora. They had three daughters. Margot became a film producer in Israel. Klausner opened further stores and soon became the largest shoe entrepreneur in Berlin. His basic business principles were low prices, flexibility and customer friendliness.

== Nazi era ==
From 1933, Julius Klausner was persecuted by the Nazis because of his Jewish heritage. Due to antti-Jewish laws, he was forced to sell 75 percent of his business to the German entrepreneur Bahner. In 1938, he fled first to Switzerland, then to Buenos Aires.

== Postwar ==
In 1945, in postwar restitution proceedings Klausner recovered fifty percent of his former business in Germany, but he remained in Argentina. He died there in 1950 and was buried at the Jewish cemetery on Heerstrasse in Berlin in accordance with his wishes.

The heirs sold their share of the Leiser shoe store to the Bahner family in 1970.

== Legacy and honors ==
Schuhhaus Leiser

In the company history of Schuhhaus Leiser, Julius Klausner is acknowledged as the founder.

Stolperstein (Commemorative "stumbling stone")

In Fasanenstraße in Berlin-Charlottenburg there is a Stolperstein in front of his last home, which no longer exists.

Bezirksmuseum Kreuzberg-Friedrichshain

An exhibition panel in the Friedrichshain-Kreuzberg district museum tells the story of Julius Klausner and his first shoe store in Oranienstraße.

== Literature ==
- Joseph Walk: Kurzbiographien zur Geschichte der Juden 1918–1945. K. G. Saur, München 1988. S. 195

== See also ==
Aryanization

The Holocaust
