= Watching TV with the Red Chinese =

2012 film by Shimon Dotan

- Theatrical release poster
- Directed by: Shimon Dotan
- Screenplay by: Netaya Anbar; Shimon Dotan
- Based on: Watching TV with the Red Chinese by Luke Whisnant
- Produced by: Shimon Dotan; Netaya Anbar; Sameer Butt
- Starring: Ryan O'Nan; Gillian Jacobs; Leonardo Nam; James Chen; Keong Sim; Michael Esper; Peter Scanavino
- Cinematography: Mike Rossetti
- Edited by: Netaya Anbar
- Music by: Nat Osborn
- Production company: Moonstone Entertainment
- Distributed by: Roam Films
- Release dates: January 20, 2012 (United States; limited)
- Running time: 105 minutes
- Country: United States
- Languages: English; Chinese

Watching TV with the Red Chinese is a 2012 American comedy-drama film directed by Shimon Dotan, based on the 1992 novel of the same name by Luke Whisnant. The film follows a trio of Chinese exchange students who arrive in New York City in 1980, eager for what America has to offer. They make friends including a literature teacher named Dexter and his girlfriend Suzanne. As they try to adjust to the New York city atmosphere, they become disillusioned with America, eventually buying a firearm for self-defense.

== Cast ==
- James Chen as Tzu
- Keong Sim as Wa
- Leonardo Nam as Chen
- Gillian Jacobs as Suzanne
- Ryan O'Nan as Dexter Mitchell
- Michael Esper as Billy
- Peter Scanavino as Czapinczyk
- Idara Victor as Antigone

== Reception ==
The film received positive reviews, with critics mostly praising the leads' performances and including minor critiques of the script. Variety, for example, called the acting "solid, particularly by O'Nan, Nam and Jacobs. But the conversations feel artificial, overly concerned with re-creating period detail." Daniel Gold of The New York Times adds that the film "nicely captures the grad-student vibe: beer-fueled bull sessions ... fragile, self-absorbed egos preening even as confidence wavers." Paste Magazine states that "overall, the film rises above the usual trappings of low-budget productions and succeeds with a smart script and able performances from the cast of (mostly) unknowns, whether you're looking for sociopolitical commentary or just a small tale well told."
