= Repeat Dive =

1982 film

- Directed by: Shimon Dotan
- Written by: Shimon Dotan; Judith Hendel
- Produced by: Shimon Dotan; Amos Mokadi
- Starring: Doron Nesher
- Cinematography: Daniel Schneor
- Edited by: Danny Shick
- Release date: 1982
- Running time: 87 minutes
- Country: Israel
- Language: Hebrew

Repeat Dive (Hebrew: צלילה חוזרת, Tzlila Chozeret) is a 1982 Israeli drama film directed by Shimon Dotan. It was entered into the 32nd Berlin International Film Festival.

== Cast ==
- Mosko Alkalai
- Zaharira Harifai
- Dan Muggia
- Doron Nesher as Yoav
- Liron Nirgad
- Batia Rosenthal as Rachel
- Yair Rubin
- Dalia Shimko
- Ze'ev Shimshoni
- Ami Traub
