= Rozina Cambos =

Israeli actress (1951–2012)

- רוזינה קמבוס
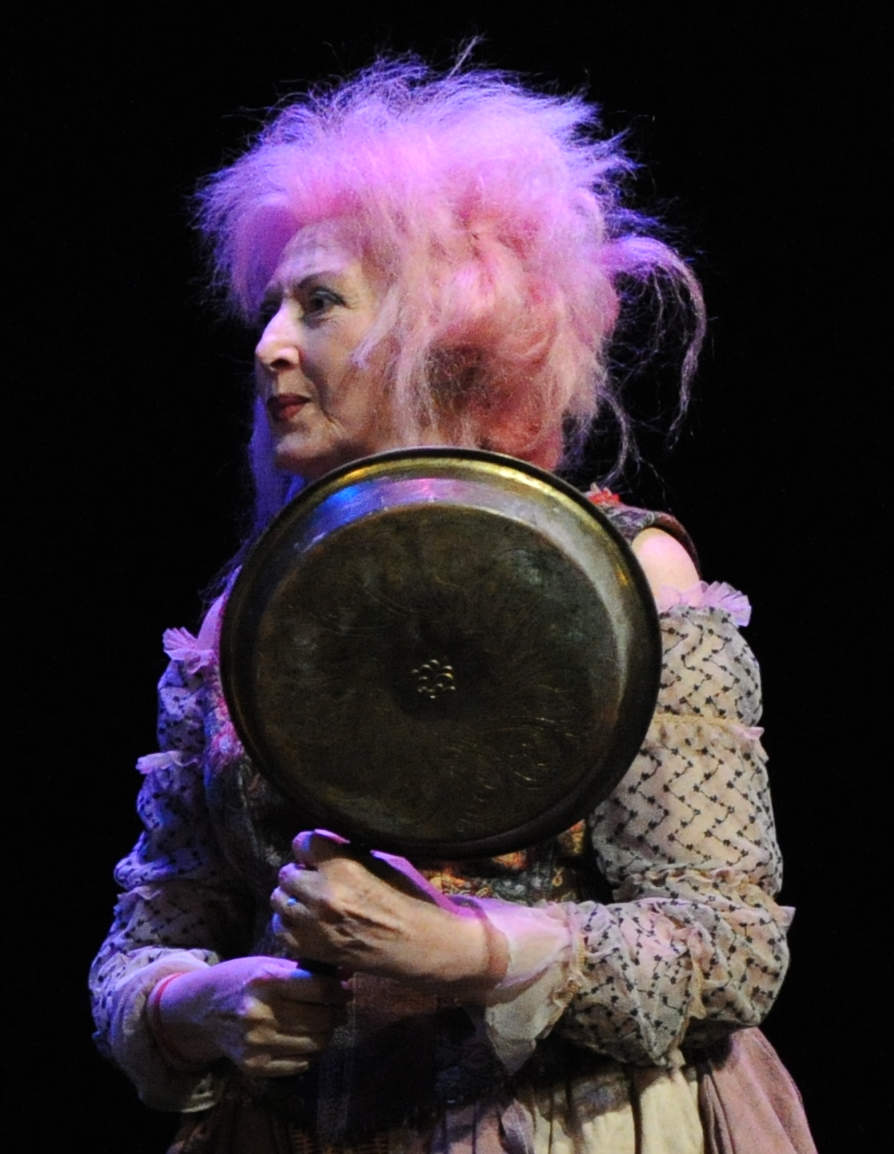
- Cambos performing at the Cameri Theatre in 2012
- Born: 17 December 1951; Bacău, Romania
- Died: 4 December 2012 (aged 60); Beit Dagan, Israel
- Other name: Rosina Kambus
- Occupation: Actress
- Years active: 1975–2012
- Children: 2

Rozina Cambos (Hebrew: רוזינה קמבוס; 17 December 1951 – 4 December 2012) was an Israeli actress who distinguished herself as a performer in both Israel and her native Romania.

== Biography ==
Cambos was born in Bacău to a Romanian-Jewish family. Her father was a stage and artistic director and her mother was an actress. After completing high school, Cambos studied medicine at the request of her parents but she left after a year to pursue acting. She completed her acting lessons at the Caragiale Academy of Theatrical Arts and Cinematography in 1975 and she first worked as an actress at a Piatra Neamț local theatre, then at the Odeon Theatre in Bucharest.

In 1983, Cambos and her son emigrated to Israel where they took up residence at an absorption centre for the first four months. She immediately integrated herself into the acting industry afterwards and over the years, she began acting at the Beersheba Theatre, the Habima Theatre and the Cameri Theatre and starred in adaptations of The Barber of Seville, Don Juan Comes Back From The War, Blood Wedding, The Italian Straw Hat and more. Her television appearances include A Matter of Time, Yellow Peppers and Zehu Ze!. On films, she was known for her appearance in Operation Grandma and she received the Ophir Award for her performance in The Human Resources Manager.

In 1993, Cambos was diagnosed with uterine cancer. After undergoing a hysterectomy, she was given the all-clear and returned to acting. She was later diagnosed with breast cancer (which caused the deaths of her mother and grandmother) in 2005. She underwent treatment for this and recovered.

=== Personal life ===
Cambos had two sons from different marriages. Her first husband moved to Switzerland following the divorce. She met her second husband after moving to Israel and they were together until her death.

== Death ==
In 2010, Cambos contracted leukemia. This time, she did not recover and she succumbed to the cancer on December 4, 2012 in Beit Dagan nearly two weeks before her 61st birthday. Cambos was given a funeral service at the Cameri Theatre and was laid to rest at Yarkon Cemetery.
