= Oren Safdie =

Canadian-American-Israeli playwright and screenwriter

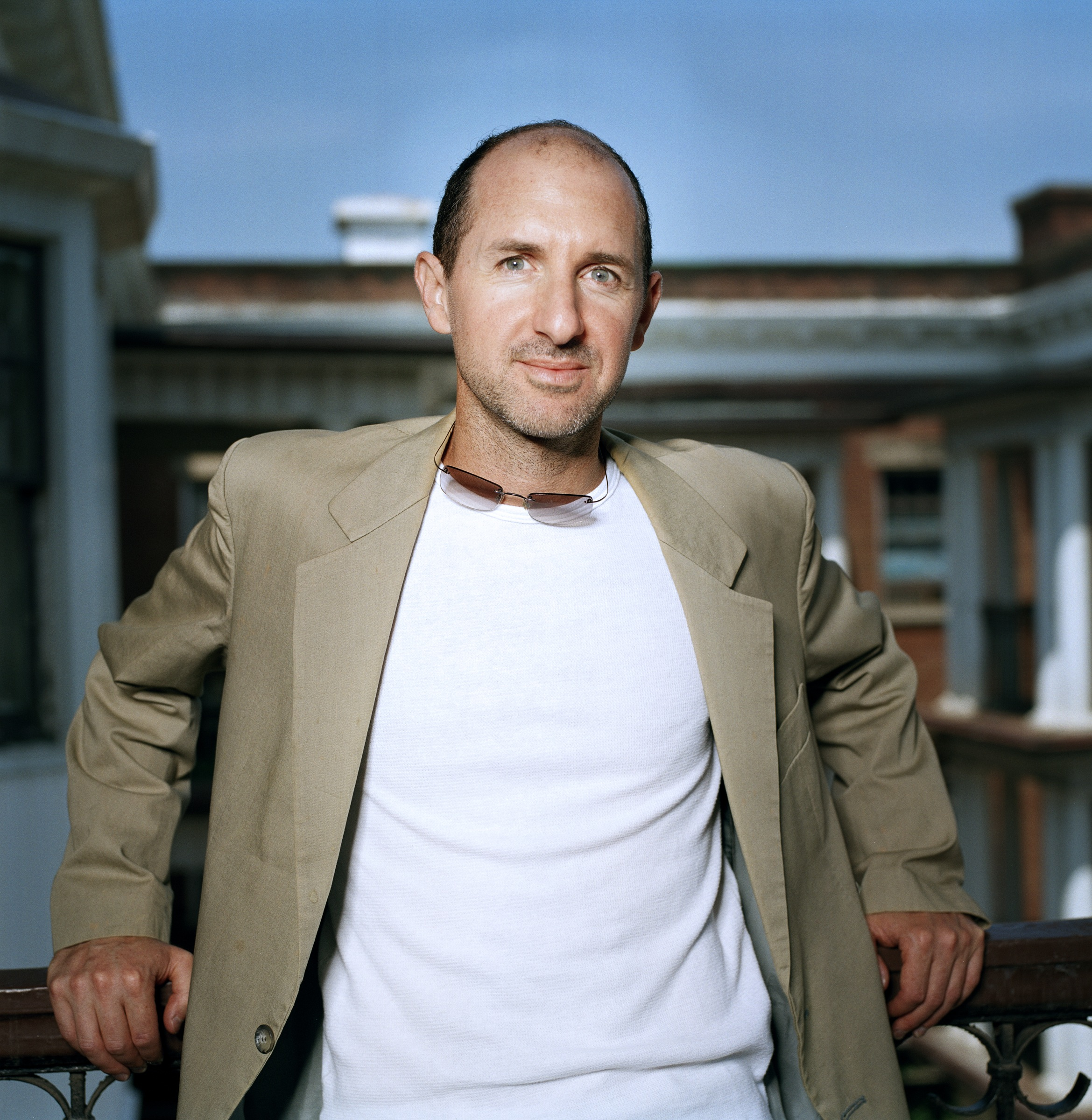
- Safdie in 2013
- Born: April 20, 1965 (age 61); Montreal, Quebec, Canada
- Occupation: Playwright
- Spouse: M. J. Kang
- Parent: Moshe Safdie (father)
- Relatives: Dov Charney (cousin); Benny Safdie (first cousin once removed); Josh Safdie (first cousin once removed)
- Writing career
- Period: 1990-present

Oren Safdie (Hebrew: אורן ספדיה; born April 20, 1965) is a Canadian-American-Israeli playwright and screenwriter, and the son of architect Moshe Safdie.

== Early life ==
Safdie was born in Montreal, Quebec, to Canadian-Israeli architect Moshe Safdie. His father's family is Israeli of Sephardic Jewish, Syrian-Jewish descent. They are related to the Safdie brothers.

== Education ==
Oren Safdie originally planned to become an architect like his father Moshe Safdie. He obtained a master of architecture degree, attending the Graduate School of Architecture at Columbia University in New York. This was an attempt, he explained, "to get closer to my dad." During his final semester there, he took an elective playwriting course and was hooked on it after winning a competition run by the Columbia Dramatists. He wrote a 10-minute scene, drawing on his experience at Columbia presenting a design to a jury of critics, which involved three ego-driven architects and one student. This eventually became Private Jokes. He stayed another four years at Columbia and completed an MFA in Fiction Writing. Safdie was awarded a Woolrich Fellowship, and founded The West End Gate Theatre, a student theater company that included actors like Oscar nominee Ethan Hawke and The Whole Nine Yards actress Amanda Peet. He became a playwright-in-residence at La MaMa back in 1996, and he produced the first ever Canadian Theatre Festival in New York.

He also spent a year at Iowa State University where he taught architecture and studied with Jane Smiley.

Beginning in 2007, he held the position of Interim Artistic Director of the Malibu Stage Company (now the Malibu Playhouse).

Safdie teaches playwriting and play analysis at the University of Miami and also advises the Astonishing Idiots, a new student-run theater company, housed under the Department of Theatre Arts.

He resides in Los Angeles with his wife, actress and playwright M. J. Kang, and their daughter born in 2008. He commutes to Miami every week and returns home for the weekends.

== Works ==
Safdie wrote the 1998 film You Can Thank Me Later, based on his play Hyper-Allergenic. It stars Ellen Burstyn, Amanda Plummer, Ted Levine, Mark Blum, Mary McDonnell and Geneviève Bujold. It won the Grand Jury Prize at the Newport Film Festival. It subsequently premiered on Showtime in the United States.

Broken Places, a dark comedy about the effects that parents can have on their children's future relationships, was first produced at the Tribeca Lab in New York in 1995.

La Compagnie, a character driven comedy, set in the garment district of Montreal, includes characters of different classes and ethnic backgrounds working at a small, family run, towel manufacturer that supplies stores across Canada. In an environment of minimum wage workers, slimy salesman, and penny-pinching bosses, everyone is dependent on each other. The link between these worlds is Frank Casselli, a hard working company foreman who has to keep everything running smoothly. La Compagnie was first produced at the Alma Shapiro Center in New York in 1996 and performed by La MaMa E.T.C. The play was optioned by Castle Rock and CBS and a half-hour comedy pilot script Fashion Avenue was written.

Jews & Jesus, a musical, satirizes the naiveté of young Jews, half-Jews, Christians who date Jews and vice versa, while questioning the place of religion in this unfettered age. The story follows two young couples, of secular upbringing, from North America to Jerusalem as they come to grips with their religion. Ronnie Cohen wrote the music and lyrics. The musical was first produced by La MaMa E.T.C. in 1998. Anita Gates described the play as "lovable" and "a terrific original work" in a New York Times review.

Fiddler Sub-Terrain, another musical collaboration with Ronnie Cohen, is a contemporary satire of Fiddler on the Roof set in the backdrop of politics in Quebec, Canada. It was produced in 2001 by La MaMa E.T.C. but was greeted with mixed reviews: "[T]he play is often not funny and sometimes hard to follow. Some of the humor nears gross-out status and gets to be too much; a lot of it is just sophomoric and barely generates a smile."; or: "There is so much wrong with Fiddler Sub-Terrain that it is hard to know where to start. The acting is amateurish, the music tuneless and the lyrics insipid."; and: "You don't have to know Fiddler on the Roof to be bored by Fiddler Sub-terrain, the leaden new satire playing at La MaMa. But exposure to the earlier piece will most likely make it even more dismaying."

Private Jokes, Public Places debuted at the Malibu Stage Company in 2003 and went on to play in New York at La MaMa E.T.C. before transferring to the Center of Architecture for a 5-month run. It was also productioned at the Tarragon Theatre in Toronto, Wellfleet Harbor Actor's Theatre in Wellfeet, Massachusetts, the Aurora Theatre in Berkeley, California, The New End Theatre in London, England, and the National Theatre of Romania in Timișoara and was translated into Japanese. Private Jokes, Public Places was a critical off-Broadway hit and was singled out in 2010 by Terry Teachout of the Wall Street Journal as one of the best half-dozen new plays he had seen since he started reviewing. It offers a disturbing, humorous glimpse inside the contemporary world of architecture as Margaret, a young Korean-American student, presents her thesis for a public swimming pool to an all-male jury of famous architects. This premise is a starting point for an examination of academia, intellectual pretension, the failure of postmodernist culture and the state of the male-female power struggle. The play is performed regularly by students at architecture schools to mark the beginning of the year.

The Last Word..., debuted Off-Broadway in 2007 in New York City, starring Daniel J. Travanti in the title role. Ed Asner did the first reading of the play at The Malibu Stage Co when it was titled Frank Barth. The plot: Henry Grunwald, a Viennese Jew who fled the Nazis and became a successful New York advertising executive, is now retired and nearly blind. He is determined to fulfill his lifelong dream of being a playwright. When aspiring playwright Len Artz applies for a job as Henry's assistant, the job interview quickly becomes a heated intellectual debate; Henry advocates Eurocentrism, Len defends experimentalism in a thought-provoking comedy about loyalty, dreams and the fear of failure.

West Bank, UK, a musical comedy collaboration with Ronnie Cohen, about a Palestinian and Israeli forced to share a rundown rent-controlled apartment in London, England, debuted at La MaMa E.T.C. in November 2007. It was a co-production with the Malibu Stage Company.

"The Bilbao Effect" became a popular term after Frank Gehry built the Guggenheim Museum in Bilbao, Spain, transforming the industrial port city into a must-see tourist destination. Its success led other cities to attempt to repeat the formula. In Safdie's play The Bilbao Effect, the second of a planned trilogy on contemporary architecture, a world-famous architect faces censure by the American Institute of Architects following accusations that his redevelopment project for Staten Island has led to a woman's suicide. The play tackles controversial urban design issues and explores whether architecture has become more of an art than a profession, and at what point the ethics of one field violate the principles of the other. It premiered at New York's Center for Architecture in May 2010.

Checks & Balances made its world premiere at the Rogers Little Theater's Victory Theater in Rogers, Arkansas, on November 2, 2012. Safdie selected the Arkansas venue because of a positive experience he had at the theater the previous year. Safdie attended the grand opening of the Crystal Bridges Museum of American Art, which was designed by his father, architect Moshe Safdie. While in the area he staged a reading of Private Jokes, Public Places at the Rogers Little Theater. He was impressed with how the audience in Rogers got jokes that New Yorkers missed. Safdie noted that: "There was a lot of excitement at the theater. The audience was sophisticated, and they got my jokes. I felt there was something happening." Checks & Balances explores the issues of legal and illegal immigration, class, privilege, the definition of family, as well as how society deals with the aged. Renamed Arkansas Public Theatre, they also debuted Safdie's play Things To Do In Munich in 2018.

False Solution, the third play about contemporary architecture, opened at La MaMa E.T.C. in 2013. The play also ran at the Santa Monica Playhouse in 2014 and starred Daniel J. Travanti. The plot involves a world-famous architect contracted by the post-communist Polish government to design a Holocaust museum. His intern feels his design is not a worthy memorial to the millions who died. In an attempt to come up with a better design, they argue art theory in a battle of wits infused with ever-growing sexual tension.

Boycott This! spans conflicts from 1930s Poland to a future state of Palestine, as a Jewish tourist in present-day Oaxaca, Mexico, spirals out of control after seeing a ‘Boycott Israel’ poster. It is based on an incident Safdie experienced while on vacation in Oaxaca, Mexico. Safdie held a reading of the play at the Blank Theater in Santa Monica, CA in 2013.

Unseamly opened to critical acclaim at the Infinitheatre in Montreal on February 13, 2014, inviting much controversy as the story closely paralleled a sexual harassment case that was brought against Safdie's cousin and CEO of American Apparel, Dov Charney. The controversy grew after Buzzfeed.com wrote a story and published a threatening greeting card Safdie had received during the production. Aside from making veiled threats against his family, it also revealed his social security number, which was later implicated in credit card fraud. Unseamly was Safdie's first play to debut in his hometown. The play was subsequently produced Off-Broadway in New York by Urban Stages in 2015, earning critical accolades including a New York Times Critics' Pick. The Wall Street Journal called it, "Smart, fast, filthy and funny." In 2014 he was working on developing a television series based on the play.

In December 2014, Safdie staged a reading of his play Mr. Goldberg Goes to Tel Aviv which explores the relationship between left-leaning Diaspora Jews and Israelis in the context of Mideast politics at the Rialto Theatre in Montreal, Quebec. The play won second prize in the Write-On-Q Playwriting Contest. It was subsequently produced at the St. James Theatre by Infinitheatre in February, 2017.

His other plays include: Hyper-Allergenic, Laughing Dogs, and Gratitude, which opened at MainLine Theatre in Montreal and winning at META (Montreal English Language Theatre Award), before playing off-Broadway at Urban Stages to critical acclaim. TheaterScene.Org listed the play on its top 10 list for New York's Best Theatre for 2022.

Safdie also co-wrote the 2007 Israeli film Bittersweet, directed by Doron Benvenisti, which played at the Jerusalem and Montreal World Film Festivals, nominated for a Wolgin Award for Best Israeli Feature and a Golden Zenith Award.

Private Jokes, Public Places, The Last Word... and The Bilbao Effect are published by Dramatists Play Service. False Solution is published by Original Works Publishing. Unseamly and Checks & Balances are published by Broadway Play Publishing Inc.

He has been a contributor to Metropolis Magazine, and has also written for Dwell, The Forward, The New Republic, The Jerusalem Post, Israel National News, The Algemeiner, The Times of Israel, the National Post, the Canadian Jewish News, and the Israeli radio network Arutz Sheva.

== Awards ==
Safdie is the recipient of numerous grants and fellowships including the Canada Council for the Arts, the Conseil des arts et des lettres du Québec, the Graham Foundation for Advanced Studies in the Fine Arts, the John Golden Fund and the Société de développement des entreprises culturelles.

Three of his plays, Boycott This, Mr. Goldberg Goes To Tel Aviv and "Lunch Hour" were second Prize winners in the Quebec-wide playwriting contest, Write-On-Q! In 2019, his play Color Blind won first place and the Kevin Tierney Prize.
