= Oded Davidoff =

Israeli film director

- עודד דוידוף
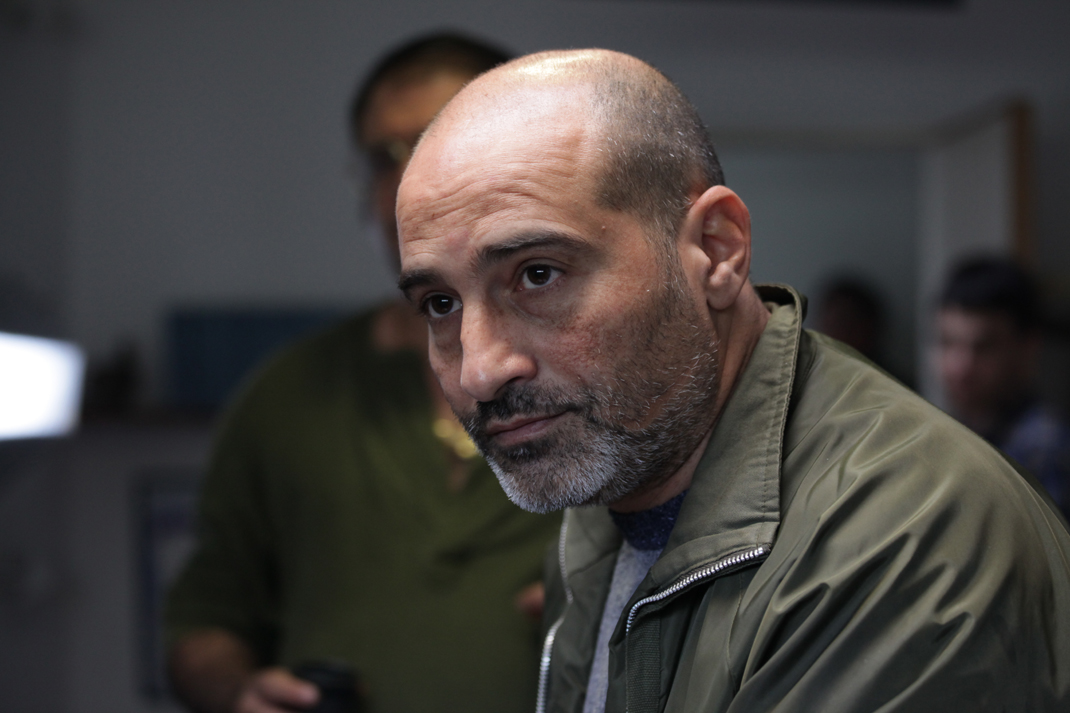
- Born: 21 February 1967 (age 59); Jerusalem, Israel
- Education: Sam Spiegel Film and Television School
- Occupation: Film director

Oded Davidoff (Hebrew: עודד דוידוף; born 1967) is an Israeli film and TV director.

== Biography ==
Davidoff was born in Jerusalem, and lived in the Bukharan Quarter as a child, before moving to Ramot.

He graduated (with honors) from the Sam Spiegel School of Film and Television. His final graduation film, “In Good Hands” (1994), was selected as one of the best films by the school.

In 2001, Davidoff directed the film “Turkish March”, a comedy thriller loosely based on Limor Nachmias' 1996 bestseller, “Pinch Me”. Its success led to a cult following. In 2005, Davidoff directed the film “Someone to Run With”, based on David Grossman's novel of the same title.

== Filmography ==
- 1994: In Good Hands (בידיים טובות; graduation film, 18 min)
- 2001: Turkish March, comedy thriller
- 2006: Someone to Run With, drama/thriller film
- 2007, 2010: Hakol Dvash, TV series
- 2011: Pillars of Smoke, mystery/drama/thriller TV series
- 2021-2023: The Beauty Queen of Jerusalem TV melodrama series
- 2016: series Ikaron HaHachlafa (The Exchange Principle, co-creator, with Noah Stollman)
- 2023: The Malevolent Bride (The Angel of Destruction), horror drama series
- 2024: One Day in October, TV series based on the personal stories from the October 7 attacks in 2023.

== Awards ==
- In Good Hands won several awards
- 2008: Hakol Dvash: at the Awards of the Israeli Television Academy the series won all awards in the comedy category: best series, best actor (Yisrael Poliakov), best actress (Yael Polyakov), best directing (Oded Davidoff), and best screenwriting (Yael Polyakov, Omer Tadmor).
- 2009: Pillars of Smoke, three awards at the Awards of the Israeli Television Academy, including best directing
