= Someone to Run With (film) =

- Directed by: Oded Davidoff
- Written by: David Grossman (novel); Noah Stollman (script)
- Produced by: Alon Shtruzman
- Starring: Bar Belfer; Yonatan Bar-Or; Yuval Mendelson; Tzahi Grad; Rinat Matatov
- Music by: Ran Shem-Tov
- Release date: 13 July 2006
- Running time: 118 minutes
- Country: Israel
- Language: Hebrew

Someone to Run With (Hebrew: מישהו לרוץ איתו, romanized: Mishehu Larutz Ito) is a 2006 Israeli drama thriller film directed by Oded Davidoff based on David Grossman's novel of the same name. The film is about two individuals who are on different missions and how their paths cross. Bar Belfer's performance won her the Special Grand Jury Award in the World Cinema Competition at the 31st Miami International Film Festival.

== Synopsis ==
The film is about two unrelated individuals named Tamar and Assaf. Tamar is an amazingly talented singer but very quiet and insecure girl who came to Jerusalem in search of her brother. She has left everyone behind including her family and got a makeover by buzzing her hair to become unrecognizable in the process. Tamar makes her ends meet by playing guitar and singing in the streets. Her impromptu performances attract the attention of Pesach, who claims to look after the city's sidewalk performers. The truth is Pesach is a criminal who charges buskers for the right to perform in the best spots in town and all but holds them hostage in a rundown hostel he's set up from them. On the other hand, Assaf is a 17-year-old boy who is working on a boring summer job at the City Hall. Assaf is a clumsy, naive, and very shy boy. One day he was given a job to find the owners of a stray dog. Unsure where to start, Asif decides to follow the lead of the dog. The dog leads to him various people and parts of the city and combining the various clues he gets from them, Assaf learns that the dog belongs to Tamar. The rest of the movie deals with how Assaf reunites the dog with Tamar and how Tamar saves herself from the clutches of Pesach.

== Cast ==
- Bar Belfer as Tamar
- Yonatan Bar-Or as Assaf
- Yuval Mendelson as Shai
- Rinat Matatov as Shelly
- Tzahi Grad as Pesach
- Danny Steg as Tzahi
- Neomi Polani as Theodora
- Rami Davidoff as Yonatan
- Smadar Jaaron as Lea

== Reception ==
Christopher Farah on Salon.com described the book as one "that may make the cynics out there snicker, the literary purists smirk, and the sentimentalists weep with joy or smug, self-fulfilled sadness." The book's film adaptation has been met with positive reviews. Variety magazine Ronnie Scheib praised the performances of Bar-Or and Belfer, saying "[they] manage to inject their characters with enough wistfulness, sweetness and compassion to prevent their strength from reading as self-righteousness.".

== Awards and nominations ==
The film received nominations in 12 categories at the 2006 Israeli Film Academy Awards, including Best Picture. Tzahi Grad won the Ophir Award in the Best Supporting Actor category.

Bar Belfer also received a Special Grand Jury Mention in the Dramatic Features - World Cinema Competition category at the 31st Miami International Film Festival in 2007
