= You Can Thank Me Later =

- DVD cover
- Directed by: Shimon Dotan
- Written by: Oren Safdie (play)
- Produced by: Netaya Anbar, Shimon Dotan
- Starring: Ellen Burstyn
- Cinematography: Amnon Salomon
- Edited by: Netaya Anbar
- Music by: Walter Christian Rothe
- Distributed by: Cinequest Films
- Release date: 1998
- Running time: 110 minutes
- Country: Canada
- Language: English

You Can Thank Me Later is a 1998 Canadian comedy-drama film directed by Shimon Dotan and starring Ellen Burstyn. The film is based on a play titled Hyper-Allergenic written and adapted for the screen by Oren Safdie.

== Cast ==
- Ellen Burstyn as Shirley Cooperberg
- Amanda Plummer as Susan Cooperberg
- Ted Levine as Eli Cooperberg
- Mark Blum as Edward Cooperberg
- Mary McDonnell as Diane
- Geneviève Bujold as Joelle
- Jacob Tierney as Simon Cooperberg
- Roc LaFortune as TV Repairman
- Macha Grenon as Linda
- Geneviève Brouillette as Nurse
- Dorothée Berryman as Art Patron
