= Margot Klausner =

- מרגו קלוסנר
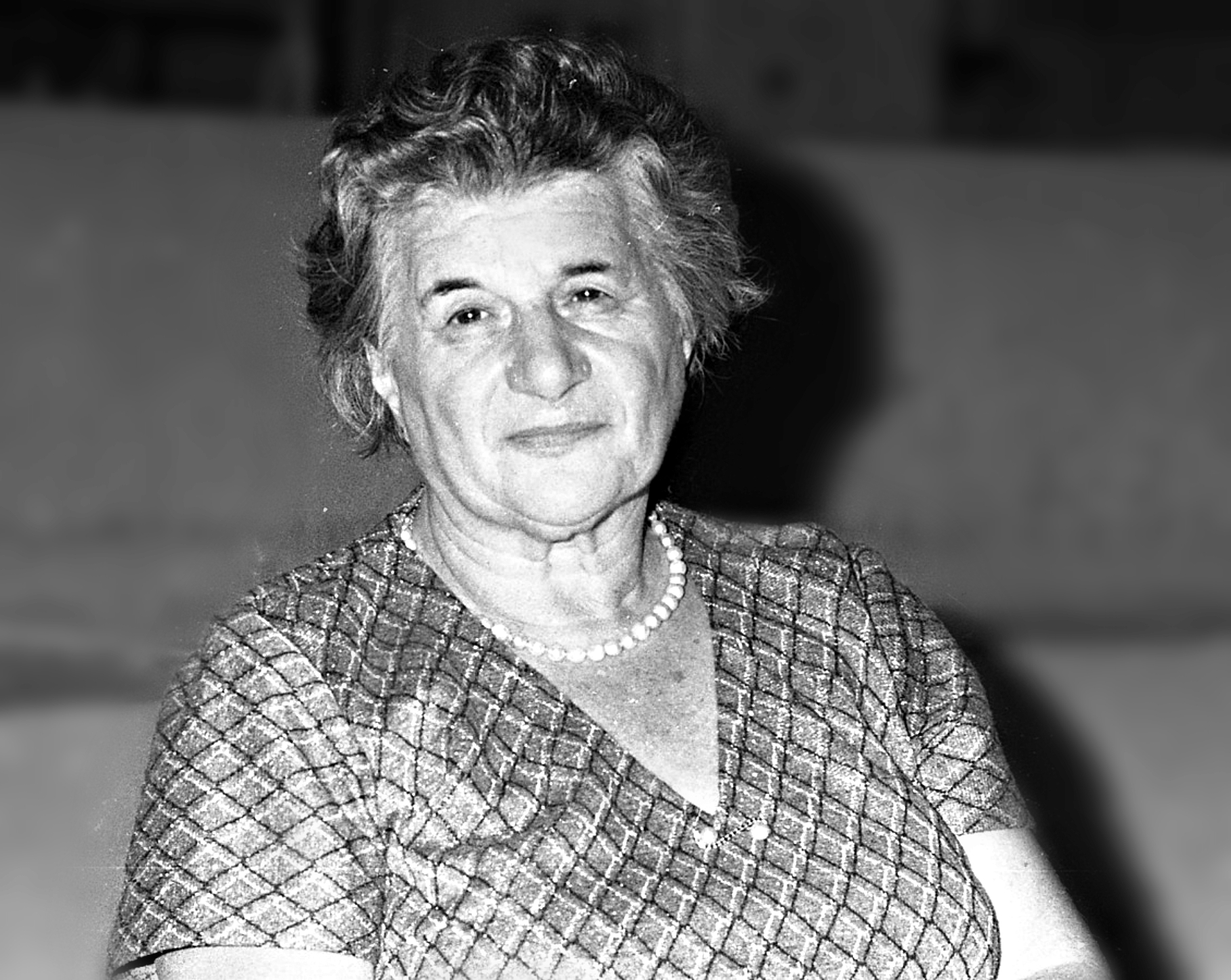
- Klausner in 1969
- Born: November 2, 1905; Berlin, Germany
- Died: November 12, 1975 (aged 70); Tel Aviv, Israel
- Other name: Margot Klausner-Brandstaetter
- Occupations: Writer; filmmaker; producer; publisher; chairman
- Spouse: Yehoshua Brandstatter
- Children: 2
- Parent(s): Dora and Julius Klausner

Margot Klausner (also: Margot Klausner-Brandstaetter) (Hebrew: מרגו קלוסנר; November 2, 1905 – November 12, 1975) was a German-Israeli writer and filmmaker. Regarded as a pioneer of Israeli filmmaking, Klausner co-founded the first Israeli film studio, Israel Motion Picture Studios Herzliyyah Ltd (more widely known as Herzliya Studios or United Studios), with her husband Yehoshua Brandstaetter in 1949. Klausner served as chairman and president of the company until her death in 1975. Klausner was instrumental in the development of the Israeli film industry, and by 1974 Herzliya Studios (which operated under different names over the years) had produced 100 feature films, and thousands of advertisements, newsreels, documentaries, and satellite transmissions.

From the 1920s until her death in 1975, Klausner published numerous works on a variety of subjects in German, Hebrew, and English. Klausner founded the Israeli Parapsychological Society and published the monthly magazine Mysterious Worlds: A Journal of Parapsychology from 1968 to 1971.

== Early life and career ==
Margot Klausner was born and raised in Berlin, Germany, to Dora and Julius Klausner. As a young woman, Klausner studied theatre and art history in Berlin, before moving to Mandatory Palestine in 1931 with her 2nd husband Yehoshua Brandstaetter. It was after meeting Klausner was instrumental in the decision to bring the Moscow-based Habimah Theatre troupe to Palestine on a tour of the country in 1927.

In 1933, Klausner and Brandstaetter started Urim, a film production company and produced Land of Promise, their first documentary film. Land of Promise won an award at the Venice Film Festival in 1935, and Urim produced several other films shortly after including; Avodah (1935), Tomorrow is a Wonderful Day (1947), and Out of Evil (1950). In 1936, Klausner acquired 50% of Carmel newsreels, and acquired the other half in 1938. Carmel-Herzliya was a major producer of Israeli newsreels until 1968, eventually being supplanted by the advent of television. In 1949, Klausner and Brandstaetter founded Israel Motion Picture Studios Herzliyyah Ltd, the first film studio in Israel, with their personal funds. Israel Motion Picture Studios Herzliyyah Ltd housed the first film laboratory in Israel, and over the next 25 years the company produced over 100 feature films, 1,000 documentaries, 390 newsreels, 850 advertisements, 1,100 video productions and 850 color satellite transmissions.

== Later life and career ==
In her later life, Klausner continued to produce films in the Israeli film industry. Klausner also became active in the Israeli parapsychological community, although this aspect of her legacy did not garner much attention outside of Israel. Klausner founded the Parapsychology Society in Israel, and served as chairman. From 1968 to 1971, Klausner published Mysterious Worlds: A Journal of Parapsychology. Klausner's two children both entered the film industry. Her daughter Miriam Spielmann - her husband Zvi Spielmann ran Herzliya Studios after her death, and her son Amos Mokadi became an actor and producer. In 1975, Klausner died in Tel Aviv, Israel.

== Selected works ==
- The Dream Industry, Memories and Facts—Twenty-Five Years of the Israel Motion Picture Studios (autobiography, 1975)

== Selected filmography ==
- Land of Promise (1933)
- Avodah (Helmar Lerski, 1935)
- Tomorrow Is a Wonderful Day (Helmar Lerski, 1947)
- Hill 24 Doesn’t Answer (Thorold Dickinson, 1955)
- Ha-shoter' Azulai/The Policeman (Ephraim Kishon, 1971)
- Metsitsim/Peeping Toms (Uri Zohar, 1973)

== Works about Klausner ==
- Saga of a Photo, 2013 (directed by Mooli Landesman)
