= Wingco Atlantica =

American blended wing body aircraft

General information
- Type: Personal aircraft
- National origin: United States
- Manufacturer: Wingco
- Designer: Alan Shaw
- Number built: prototypes only

History
- First flight: 2002

Atlantica is a blended wing body aircraft being developed by Wingco, an aircraft manufacturer. Wingco's website states that the aircraft is based on technology developed before World War II. The aircraft features five seats and a top speed of 240 knots (440 km/h). The aircraft is unique in that it is made from five different sections welded together.

== Accident ==
During testing at Melbourne Orlando International Airport in Florida in January 2003, a prototype aircraft was involved in an accident. The pilot told authorities that he had been carrying out a high speed taxi to test the aircraft, and had not intended to become airborne, however the plane lifted off the tarmac and impacted with it again seconds later. The pilot suffered minor injuries in the accident. A report by the NTSB (National Transportation Safety Board) found that:

During the high speed taxi, the pilot raised the nose of the airplane and it became airborne. The airplane climbed with a high angle of attack to approximately 100 feet [30 m]. The pilot then reduced the power to idle and lowered the airplane nose. The airplane collided with the ground as the pilot attempted to recover from the inadvertent flight. During the collision with the ground the ballistic recovery parachute was deployed, and the airplane was dragged 200 feet [61 m] off the runway.

The investigators concluded that pilot error was to blame, specifically "the National Transportation Safety Board determines the probable cause of this accident [to be] the pilot's inadvertent liftoff and his failure to maintain airspeed which resulted in a stall."
