= To the End of the Land =

2008 novel by David Grossman

- Author: David Grossman
- Original title: אשה בורחת מבשורה
- Translator: Jessica Cohen
- Language: Hebrew
- Genre: anti-war novel, literary fiction
- Publisher: HaKibbutz HaMeuchad Publishing House, Ltd (1st edition)
- Publication date: 2008 (1st edition)
- Publication place: Israel
- English publication date: 21 September 2010 (1st American edition)
- Media type: Print (Hardcover)
- Pages: 592 (Hardcover, 1st American edition)
- ISBN: 978-0-307-59297-2
- OCLC: 495781119

To the End of the Land (Hebrew: אשה בורחת מבשורה, romanized: Isha Borachat Mibsora, lit. 'A Woman Flees a Message') is a 2008 novel by Israeli writer David Grossman depicting the emotional strains that family members of soldiers experience when their loved ones are deployed into combat. Grossman began writing the novel in May 2003 when his oldest son Yonatan was serving in the Israel Defense Forces and the book was largely completed by August 2006 when his younger son Uri was killed in the Second Lebanon War.

Originally written in Hebrew, an English translation by Jessica Cohen was published in September 2010 to widespread critical acclaim. Translation of this work presented a considerable challenge to the translator, as the original includes numerous Hebrew puns as well as quotations from and allusions to the Hebrew Bible as well as works of modern Hebrew literature.

== Plot synopsis ==
Ora, a recently divorced Jerusalemite physiotherapist in her early fifties, had anxiously waited for her son Ofer to get through his three years' term of military service – spent mainly in confronting and skirmishing with the rebellious Palestinians of the Second Intifada. However, just as she prepares to mark Ofer's safe return by going off with him to a long-planned week of backpacking in the Galilee, the West Bank situation sharply escalates and the Israeli Army launches an all-out invasion ("Operation Defensive Shield" of April 2002). To Ora's great dismay, Ofer volunteers to rejoin his unit. Taking him in a taxi to the base camp, Ora is filled with apprehension that Ofer is going to get killed, and compares herself to the Biblical Abraham who took his son off to be slaughtered. Back in her empty home, she is haunted by unbearable visions of army officers knocking on her door and bringing the message of Ofer's death in action, and at a moment's notice she runs off "To the End of the Land".

Ora's wanderings and trekking through the Israeli countryside make up the bulk of the book's plot. She refuses to listen to news broadcasts or read papers, but cannot help noticing monuments of old battles and the inscribed names of dead soldiers. Interspersed with Ora's various experiences – surrealistic, nightmarish and sometimes humorous – are memories of previous events in her life, love relationships and motherhood, and the way it was impacted by earlier wars and conflicts in Israel's history.

The story moves back and forth in time with extensive flashbacks, going back to the 1967 Six Day War – when the teenager Ora was confined to a hospital isolation ward where she met two boys, Avram and Ilan, fell in love with both of them and entered into a very complicated, lifelong love triangle. It would be Avram who would eventually father Ofer, while Ilan would become Ora's husband, lovingly raising this son. Avram would become terribly traumatized after undergoing torture as a prisoner of war in the 1973 Yom Kippur War, and cut himself off from her and from his son – despite, or precisely because of, caring greatly. But at the ultimate crisis in the story's present moment, Avram would reappear to share Ora's desperate quest.

== Reception ==
To the End of the Land was nominated for the 2010 National Book Critics Circle Award for Fiction and won the 2011 JQ Wingate Prize. The novel's French translation, Une femme fuyant l'annonce, won the 2011 Prix Médicis étranger award for the best book published that year in translation. In August 2011 it was among the books which U.S. President Barack Obama took with him on vacation.
