= The Settlers (2016 film) =

- Directed by: Shimon Dotan
- Release date: 22 January 2016 (SFF)
- Running time: 95 minutes
- Country: Israel

The Settlers is a 2016 Israeli documentary film directed by Shimon Dotan. The film takes a critical look at the Israeli settlements in the West Bank.

== Plot ==
"The Settlers" traces the history of Israeli settlements in the West Bank and their growth through both individual action and, in this telling, the sometimes tacit encouragement of Israeli politicians. Dotan doesn't do much to disguise his pessimistic perspective on one of the most fought-over areas on the globe, where he encounters a range of rationales for living on contested land as well as some surprisingly unguarded interview subjects.

== Critical reception ==
Rotten Tomatoes gives the film at 95% approval rating and an average rating of 7.5/10 based on 298 reviews. Variety Magazine noted it as one of the Films Of The Year, it was also nominated in Sundance for Best Documentary.
