= Noah Stollman =

Israeli screenwriter & producer (born 1966)

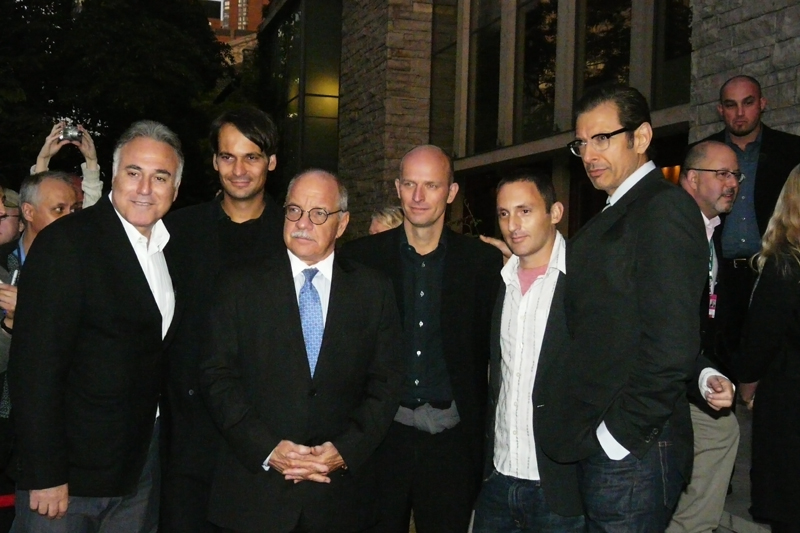
Noah Stollman is the second from the right in the first row

Noah Stollman (Hebrew: נח סטולמן; born September 29, 1966) is an Israeli screenwriter and TV producer.

Stallman was born in the United States. His family emigrated to Israel when he was three and he grew up in Jerusalem. After he graduated from Sam Spiegel Film and Television School, he and his wife moved to New York in 1995, where they lived for 14 years and had two children. Having a number of colleagues in Israel, during this time he wrote several scripts for Israeli TV and cinema. In 2009 he returned to Israel.

== Filmography ==
- 2006: Someone to Run With
  - The film was nominated for Ophir Prize in 12 categories, including screenwriting, but won only Best Supporting Actor (Tzahi Grad)
- 2006: Lemarit Ain
  A blind girl comes from the United States, where she studied, back to Israel after learning about the suicide of her cousin and she tries to investigate this.
  2010:American remake under the title Lies in Plain Sight
- 2008: Adam Resurrected
- 2009-2011: thriller series, 2 episodes, Pillars of Smoke (Timrot Ashan) In 2011 NBC acquired rights of production, but cancelled.)
- 2010: The Human Resources Manager
- 2015: Atlantica
  comedy-drama TV series; about the real Israeli band, Atlantica
- 2016: series Ikaron HaHachlafa (The Exchange Principle, screenwriting)
- 2019, "Chapter 2: I Love Toto" episode of Our Boys, American-Israeli TV miniseries
- 2019, 2022: head screenwriter for 3rd and 4th seasons of Fauda
- 2023: The Malevolent Bride (The Angel of Destruction), horror drama series (producer, with others)

== Awards ==
- 2010: Ophir Prize for the screenplay for the film The Human Resources Manager.
