= David Grossman =

Israeli novelist (born 1954)

- דויד גרוסמן
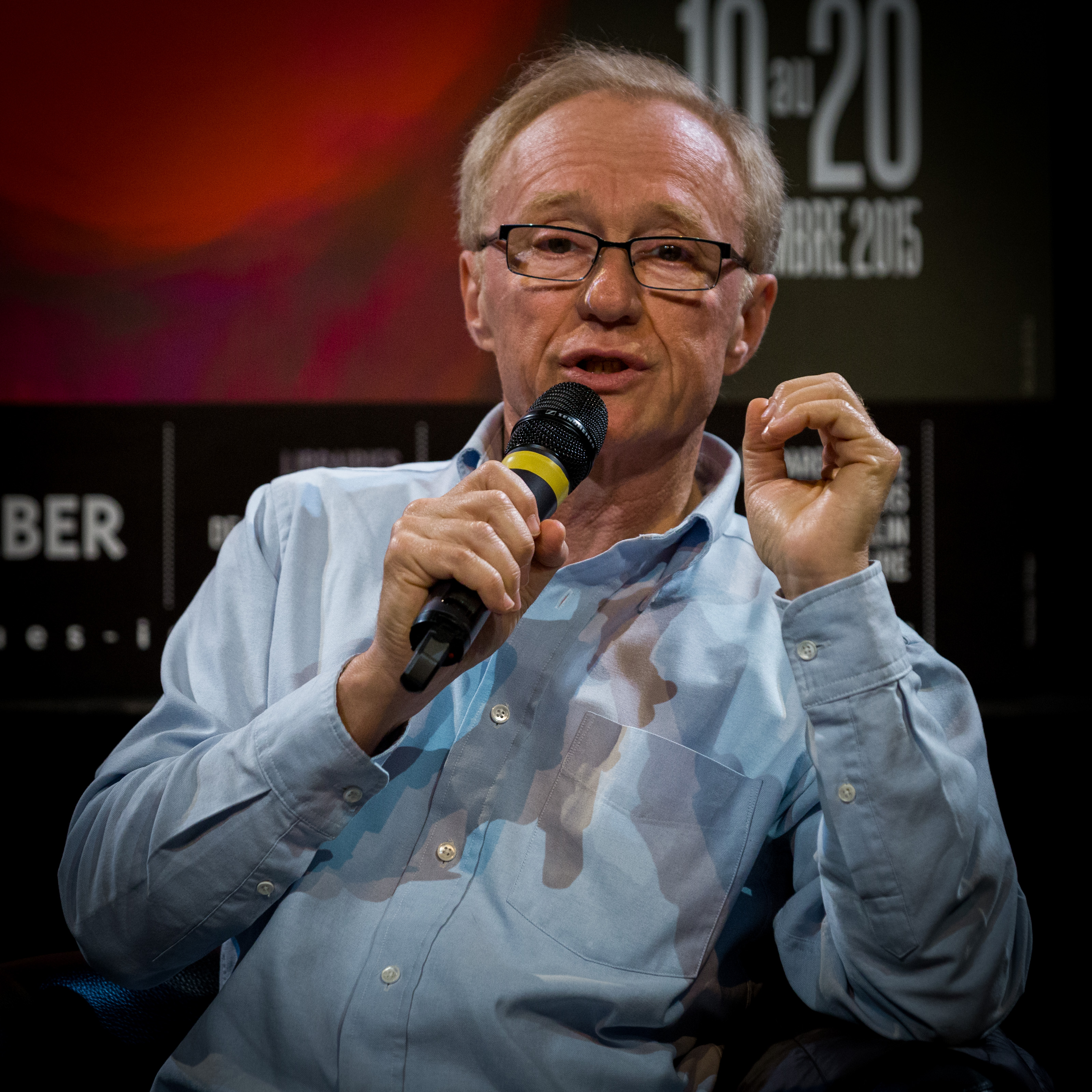
- Born: January 25, 1954 (age 72); Jerusalem, Israel
- Citizenship: Israeli
- Education: The Hebrew University of Jerusalem
- Occupation: Writer
- Spouse: Michal Grossman
- Children: 3
- Writing career
- Notable awards: 1985 Bernstein Prize; 1993 Bernstein Prize; 2001 Sapir Prize; 2004 JQ Wingate Prize; 2004 Bialik Prize; 2007 Emet Prize; 2007 Ischia International Journalism Award; 2008 Geschwister-Scholl-Preis; 2010 Peace Prize of the German Book Trade; 2011 JQ Wingate Prize; 2015 St. Louis Literary Award; 2017 Man Booker International; Prize: 2018 Israel Prize; 2022 Erasmus Prize

David Grossman (Hebrew: דויד גרוסמן; born January 25, 1954) is an Israeli author. His books have been translated into more than 30 languages.

In 2018, he was awarded the Israel Prize for literature.

== Biography ==
David Grossman was born in Jerusalem. He is the elder of two brothers. His mother, Michaella, was born in Mandatory Palestine; his father, Yitzhak, emigrated from Dynów in Poland with his widowed mother at the age of nine. His mother's family was Labor Zionist and poor. His grandfather paved roads in the Galilee and supplemented his income by buying and selling rugs. His maternal grandmother, a manicurist, left Poland after police harassment. Accompanied by her son and daughter, she immigrated to Palestine and worked as a maid in wealthy neighborhoods.

Grossman's father was a bus driver, then a librarian. Among the literature he brought home for his son to read were the stories of Sholem Aleichem. At age 9, Grossman won a national competition on knowledge of Sholem Aleichem. He worked as a child actor for the national radio and continued working for the Israel Broadcasting Authority for nearly 25 years.

In 1971, Grossman served in the IDF military intelligence corps. He was in the army when the Yom Kippur War broke out in 1973, but saw no action.

Grossman studied philosophy and theater at the Hebrew University of Jerusalem.

Grossman lives in Mevaseret Zion on the outskirts of Jerusalem. He is married to Michal Grossman, a child psychologist. They had three children, Yonatan, Ruthi, and Uri. Uri was a tank-commander in the Israel Defense Forces, and was killed in action on the last day of the 2006 Lebanon War. Uri's life was later celebrated in Grossman's book Falling Out of Time.

== Radio career ==
After university, Grossman became an anchor on Kol Yisrael, Israel's national broadcasting service. In 1988 he was sacked for refusing to bury the news that the Palestinian leadership had declared its own state and conceded Israel's right to exist.

== Literary career ==
He addressed the Israeli–Palestinian conflict in his 2008 novel, To the End of the Land. Since that book's publication he has written a children's book, an opera for children and several poems. His 2014 book, Falling Out of Time, deals with the grief of parents in the aftermath of their children's death. In 2017, he was awarded the Man Booker International Prize in conjunction with his frequent collaborator and translator, Jessica Cohen, for his novel A Horse Walks into a Bar.

== Political activism ==
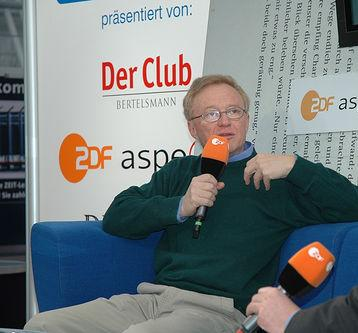
David Grossman, Leipzig

Grossman is an outspoken left-wing peace activist. He has been described by The Economist as epitomising Israel's left-leaning cultural elite.

Initially supportive of Israel's action during the 2006 Lebanon War on the grounds of self-defense, on August 10, 2006, he and fellow authors Amos Oz and A.B. Yehoshua held a press conference at which they strongly urged the government to agree to a ceasefire that would create the basis for a negotiated solution, saying: "We had a right to go to war. But things got complicated. ... I believe that there is more than one course of action available."

Two days later, Grossman's 20-year-old son Uri, a staff sergeant in the 401st Armored Brigade, was killed in southern Lebanon when his tank was hit by an anti-tank missile shortly before the ceasefire came into effect. Grossman explained that the death of his son did not change his opposition to Israel's policy towards the Palestinians. Although Grossman had carefully avoided writing about politics, in his stories, if not his journalism, the death of his son prompted him to deal with the Israeli-Palestinian conflict in greater detail. This appeared in his 2008 book To The End of the Land.

Two months after his son's death, Grossman addressed a crowd of 100,000 Israelis who had gathered to mark the anniversary of the assassination of Yitzhak Rabin in 1995. He denounced Ehud Olmert's government for a failure of leadership and he argued that reaching out to the Palestinians was the best hope for progress in the region: "Of course I am grieving, but my pain is greater than my anger. I am in pain for this country and for what you [Olmert] and your friends are doing to it."

About his personal link to the war, Grossman said: "There were people who stereotyped me, who considered me this naive leftist who would never send his own children into the army, who didn't know what life was made of. I think those people were forced to realise that you can be very critical of Israel and yet still be an integral part of it; I speak as a reservist in the Israeli army myself.

In 2010 Grossman, his wife, and her family attended demonstrations against the spread of Israeli settlements. While attending weekly demonstrations in Sheikh Jarrah in East Jerusalem against Jewish settlers taking over houses in Palestinian neighbourhoods, he was assaulted by police. When asked by a reporter for The Guardian about how a renowned writer could be beaten, he replied: "I don't know if they know me at all."

In an interview with la Repubblica in 2025, Grossman said he believed Israel was committing genocide in Gaza. Grossman also said he remains convinced that "the curse of Israel began with the occupation of the Palestinian territories in 1967". A few days later, Member of Knesset Ofer Cassif was forcibly removed from the podium of the Israeli parliament for quoting Grossman's statements.

== Awards and recognition ==
In 2015, Grossman withdrew his candidacy for the Israel Prize for Literature after Prime Minister Binyamin Netanyahu tried to remove two of the judging panel who he claimed were "anti-Zionist". He was awarded the prize in 2018.

- 1984: Prime Minister's Prize for Hebrew Literary Works
- 1985: Bernstein Prize (original Hebrew novel category)
- 1991: Nelly Sachs Prize
- 1993: Bernstein Prize (original Hebrew novel category)
- 2001: Sapir Prize for Someone to Run With
- 2004: JQ Wingate Prize (fiction) for Someone to Run With
- 2004: Italian prize Premio Flaiano;
- 2004: Bialik Prize for literature (with Haya Shenhav and Ephraim Sidon)
- 2007: Emet Prize
- 2007: Ischia International Journalism Award
- 2007: honorary Doctor Honoris Causa by the Katholieke Universiteit Leuven, Belgium
- 2008: Geschwister-Scholl-Preis
- 2010: Albatros Literaturpreis for To the End of the Land, with German translator Anne Birch Hauer
- 2010: Peace Prize of the German Book Trade
- 2010: National Jewish Book Award for To the End of the Land
- 2011: JQ Wingate Prize for To the End of the Land
- 2015: St. Louis Literary Award from the Saint Louis University Library Associates
- 2017: Man Booker International Prize for A Horse Walks into a Bar (with translator Jessica Cohen)
- 2018: Israel Prize
- 2021: Elected a Royal Society of Literature International Writer
- 2022: Winner of the Erasmus Prize.
- 2024: Marion Dönhoff Prize for International Understanding and Reconciliation
- 2024: Heinrich Heine prize for promoting human rights
- 2026: Thomas Mann Prize

== Works translated into English ==
=== Fiction ===
- Duel [דו קרב / Du-krav, 1982]. London: Bloomsbury, 1998, ISBN 0-7475-4092-6
- The Smile of the Lamb [חיוך הגדי / Hiyukh ha-gedi: roman, 1983]. New York: Farrar, Straus and Giroux, 1990, ISBN 0-374-26639-5
- See Under: Love [עיין ערך: אהבה / Ayen erekh—-ahavah: roman, 1986]. New York: Farrar, Straus, and Giroux, 1989, ISBN 0-374-25731-0
- The Book of Intimate Grammar [ספר הדקדוק הפנימי / Sefer ha-dikduk ha-penimi: roman, 1991]. New York: Farrar, Straus, and Giroux, 1994, ISBN 0-374-11547-8
- The Zigzag Kid [יש ילדים זיג זג / Yesh yeladim zigzag, 1994]. New York: Farrar, Straus, and Giroux, 1997, ISBN 0-374-52563-3 – won two prizes in Italy: the Premio Mondello in 1996, and the Premio Grinzane Cavour in 1997.
- Be My Knife [שתהיי לי הסכין / She-tihyi li ha-sakin, 1998]. New York: Farrar, Straus, and Giroux, 2001, ISBN 0-374-29977-3
- Someone to Run With [מישהו לרוץ איתו / Mishehu laruts ito, 2000]. London: Bloomsbury, 2003, ISBN 0-7475-6207-5
- Her Body Knows: two novellas [בגוף אני מבינה / Ba-guf ani mevinah: tsemed novelot, 2003]. New York: Farrar, Straus, and Giroux, 2005, ISBN 0-374-17557-8
- To the End of the Land [אישה בורחת מבשורה / Isha Borahat MiBesora, 2008]. Jessica Cohen, trans. Knopf, 2010, ISBN 0-307-59297-9
- Falling Out of Time. Jessica Cohen, trans. Knopf, 2014, ISBN 0-385-35013-9
- A Horse Walks Into a Bar: A Novel. [סוס אחד נכנס לְבָּר / Soos Echad Nechnas L'bar]. Jessica Cohen, trans. Knopf, 2017, ISBN 0-451-49397-4
- More Than I Love My Life, 2019, אתי החיים משחק הרבה

=== Nonfiction ===
- The Yellow Wind [הזמן הצהוב / Ha-Zeman ha-tsahov, 1987]. New York: Farrar, Straus, and Giroux, 1988, ISBN 0-374-29345-7
- Sleeping on a Wire: Conversations with Palestinians in Israel [נוכחים נפקדים / Nokhehim Nifkadim, 1992]. New York: Farrar, Straus, and Giroux, 1993, ISBN 0-374-17788-0
- Death as a Way of Life: Israel Ten Years after Oslo [מוות כדרך חיים / Mavet ke-derech khayyim, 2003]. New York: Farrar, Straus, and Giroux, 2003, ISBN 0-374-10211-2
- Lion’s honey: the myth of Samson [דבש אריות / Dvash arayiot, 2005]. Edinburgh; New York: Canongate, 2006, ISBN 1-84195-656-2
- Writing in the Dark: Essays on Literature and Politics New York: Farrar, Straus, and Giroux, 2008, ISBN 978-0-312-42860-0
- The Thinking Heart: Essays on Israel and Palestine Jonathan Cape (Penguin Random House), 2024, ISBN 9781787335509

== Films ==
- The Smile of the Lamb, award-winning film written and directed by Shimon Dotan, based on the Grossman novel by the same name.
- Someone to Run With, directed by Oded Davidoff, based on the Grossman novel by the same name.
- The Book of Intimate Grammar was the basis for an award-winning film by Nir Bergman.
- The Zigzag Kid, directed by Vincent Bal, based on the Grossman novel by the same name.

== See also ==
- Israeli literature

== Relevant literature ==
- Ben-Dov, Nitza. "My Imaginary Offspring: "Reality and Fantasy in Days of Ziklag" by S. Yizhar and in "If There is a Heaven" by Ron Leshem." Hebrew Studies 50, no. 1 (2009): 185-194.
- Morahg, Gilead. "Israel's New Literature of the Holocaust: The Case of David Grossman's See Under: Love." 'MFS Modern Fiction Studies 45, no. 2 (1999): 457-479.
