= Someone to Run With =

2000 novel by David Grossman

- Author: David Grossman
- Original title: מישהו לרוץ איתו
- Language: Hebrew
- Genre: Thriller
- Publisher: Bloomsbury (English edition)
- Publication date: 2000 (Hebrew), 2003 (English)
- Publication place: Israel
- Media type: Print (Hardcover, Paperback)
- ISBN: 0-7475-6207-5

Someone to Run With (Hebrew: מישהו לרוץ איתו, romanized: Mishehu Larutz Ito) is a 2000 thriller novel by Israeli writer David Grossman. Bloomsbury published The English edition in London in 2003 ISBN 0-7475-6207-5. Almog Vered and Maya Gurantz have translated the book.

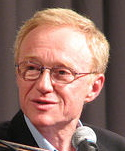
David Grossman, author

== Plot ==
=== Assaf ===
Assaf is a 16-years-old boy from Jerusalem, working during the summer vacation in City Hall as his parents are abroad. Assaf is requested to locate the owners of a lost dog without a license. During his search Assaf comes to learn about Tamar and her life, the owner of the dog named Dinka, and the two form a connection.

In his search for her, Assaf is lead to Lifta, where he finds two drug-addicted teenagers that tell him Tamar is looking for a guitarist named Shai, and Assaf believes, to his dismay, this is her boyfriend. Later, Assaf discovers Tamar had encountered the Mafia, involved in drugs and crime, and debates whether to continue to look for her. While she is a stranger to him, finding her journals gives him a window to her innermost secrets, and he feels like he had known her for his entire life.

Through his search, Assaf comes across Leah's restaurant. Leah recognizes Dinka, and trusts Assaf enough to drive him to Tamar's hiding place, a cave in the Jerusalem mountains. There, finally united, Assaf volunteers to help Tamar on her mission, withdrawing Shai, who is revealed to be her brother, from heroin.

=== Tamar ===
Tamar's storyline begins a month before Assaf and Dinka's.

Tamar, 16 years-old girl, brave, smart and realistic, she is depicted as mature and observant for her age. She sings in a choir, and plans to go to Italy to perform there with her best friends. However, her life changes when a phone call from her older brother, Shai, reaches her. Shai has disappeared some time before, ran from home and got addicted to Heroin. Shai has found refuge in Mafioso shelter named Pesach. Pesach runs a shelter for street-performing children, and takes their money to support them, while also providing some of them with drugs and alcohol. Pesach has cultivated Shai, a gifted guitar-player, and got him addicted to heroin to bind Shai to him.

Months after the phone call, Tamar prepares to save Shai and withdraw him from his drug addiction. She arranges a cave to bring Shai to after escaping the shelter, and care for him during his withdrawal period. Cutting her hair to change her appearance, Tamar sings in the street and catches Pesach's eyes, who takes her in, there she is finally reunited with Shai. Along in the shelter, Tamar befriends a street-comedian named Sheli, who later dies from overdose.

Using help from a stranger in the street, Tamar contacts Leah and tells her where and when to meet them. In a joint show, Tamar manages to create a distraction and flee in Leah's car, but abandoning Dinka in the process. This is how Dinka arrives to Assaf, mere days after Tamar and Shai's escape.

=== The reunion ===
At first Tamar thinks Assaf is one of Pesach's henchmen and tries to attack him, but Dinka's trust in Assaf dissuades her. They come to know each other and trust one another. Assaf tells her about his journey with Dinka, and the places he has been, while Tamar tells Assaf that Shai is her brother, not boyfriend. Assaf decides to help Tamar through the withdrawal. After some very labourous days, Pesach and his henchmen discover the cave, and try to tempt Shai with another doze of heroin to come with them. In a moment of lucidity Shai refuses, and Pesach promises him to break his fingers so he may never play again. It is then that Assaf's friend, Rhino (Ztahi) shows with the police, arrest Pesach and his men. It is revealed that Rhino tipped Pesach anonymously about the cave, then called the police to catch the mafioso in a trap.

Shai would return to his parents' home, while Assaf, Tamar and Dinka return to the cave.

== Main characters ==
- Assaf – 16 years old boy, amateur photographer. He is described as a tall and large-bodied boy, although harmless and quite timid. During his journey in Jerusalem he discovers his inner strength, courage and power. Assaf's parents are absent throughout the book, travelling to United States to visit Assaf's sister, recently engaged to an American.
- Tamar – 16 years old girl, opera singer. She is an observant, realistic girl who is not afraid to speak truthfully, even if the truth is harsh and ugly. Living in a very cold house, Tamar writes in a journal about her philosophy of life. She plans ahead her retrieval of Shai from Pesach's shelter, and even risks and buys him heroin so he might cooperate during the first days of his withdrawal.
- Dinka – A yellow-labrador mix, Dinka is Tamar and Shai's dog. Dinka is the link between Assaf and Tamar. Dinka leads Assaf throughout Jerusalem and guides him to her. While she is a dog, Dinka is an extremely important character in the book. Dinka is named after Alice's cat.
- Shai – Tamar's brother, Shai is an 18 years old boy, a gifted guitar player. His own philosophy of life is harsher and darker than his younger sister. Throughout the book it is only Tamar who can understand him and help him. It is indicated Shai ran from home because of their parents, who are cold and distant. He is addicted to heroin, and one of Pesach's stars.
- Theodora – A Greek nun who arrives to Jerusalem many years before the book takes place. Theodora is from a fictional island in the Aegean Sea, and sent to Jerusalem to host the pilgrims, with a vow she will never leave the monastery. Her island, however, sinks to the bottom of the sea after a violent earthquake, leaving Theodora imprisoned in her monastery. Her monastery has a garden which attracts the attention of a nearby school, in which Tamar is a student. Theodora and Tamar becomes fast friends, and to distract Assaf's chasers, she leaves the monastery after fifty years of enclosure.
- Leah – a restaurant manager and chef, Leah is another one of Tamar's friends. According to the book she is a tall, frightening woman with scars on her cheek, a former member of the crime scene. Tamar worked in her restaurant to earn some money. Leah adopts an East-Asian girl named Noa, to whom Tamar is very attached to.
- Pesach – a mafioso and runs a shelter for street-performers, Pesach is the main antagonist of the book. He manages the street performers across Israel, and takes their earnings in payment. He supplies Shai with heroin, and others with LSD, cigarettes and alcohol. His shelter is in an abandoned hospital, with his parents as hunters for other street-performers. It is hinted that he is a target for the police but never caught with incriminating evidence.

=== Secondary characters ===
- Roi – Formerly an unpopular kid and Assaf's best friend, Roi grows popular in high school and bullies Assaf psychologically. Through the book Assaf comes to realize he and Roi had grown apart, and breaks their friendship apart. Near the end of the book Roi tries to convince Assaf to talk to him, but Assaf refuses.
- Matzliah – one of Tamar's friends Assaf encounters in his journey. Matzliah is burned across his face, and Tamar connects with him by lying to him she is blind. Matzliah is home-schooled and loves astronomy.
- Relli (Israela) – Assaf's older sister. Had been with Rhino for a long time, but eventually breaks up with him and goes abroad to marry a successful electrician. She is absent throughout the book.
- Rhino (Ztahi) – Assaf's friend and his sister's ex-boyfriend. While he and Relli are no longer in relationship, Assaf and Karnaf remained friends and Assaf sees him as an older brother and mentor.
- Sheli – a street-performer in Pesach's shelter, she is a comedian and impressionist. Energetic and funny, Sheli and Tamar become roommates shortly after Tamar enters Pesach's shelter. Later in the book she dies from overdose or alcohol poisoning.
- Moshe Honigmann – a stranger, Tamar asks his help before her and Shai's escape. He is hinted, later in the book, to have a romantic relationship with Leah. Harmless-looking and slightly pathetic, Moshe helps Tamar and Shai escape.

== Themes in the book ==
One of the main themes in the book is relationship and friendships. Tamar and Shai are close siblings, but while Shai is older, Tamar is the one making the shots throughout the book. While Karnaf and Assaf are not related, Assaf sees Karnaf as an older brother and mentor, a tough man he wants to become. Tamar's best friends slowly grow distant from her as she plans her rescue mission, and she discovers they don't understand the depths of darkness in the city, preferring to remain in sarcastic, ignorant bliss. Assaf breaks up with his best friend, Roi, understanding Roi is using him and bullies him.

Courage is another recurring theme in the book. Assaf, at first a timid and shy person, discovers he can be brave in situations he finds himself. Tamar must be brave to enter the dark side of the city, involved in drugs and crime.

The plot of the book is not linear, and jumps between Tamar and Assaf's plotlines. Occasionally the narrative goes back to provide background for certain characters, like Theodora's backstory or Tamar's distancing from her friends.

The book is full with references to real places in Jerusalem: Zion Square, Lifta, Ben Yehuda street and Na'halat Shiva. Other places, like Theodora's monastery and Pesach's shelter, are inspired by real places but fictional. The book also mentions several Israeli songs and poems, like "how does one little star dares", "marionettes", "the flute" and more. In the original edition in Hebrew, a short list of the songs mentioned is provided.

== The book in art ==
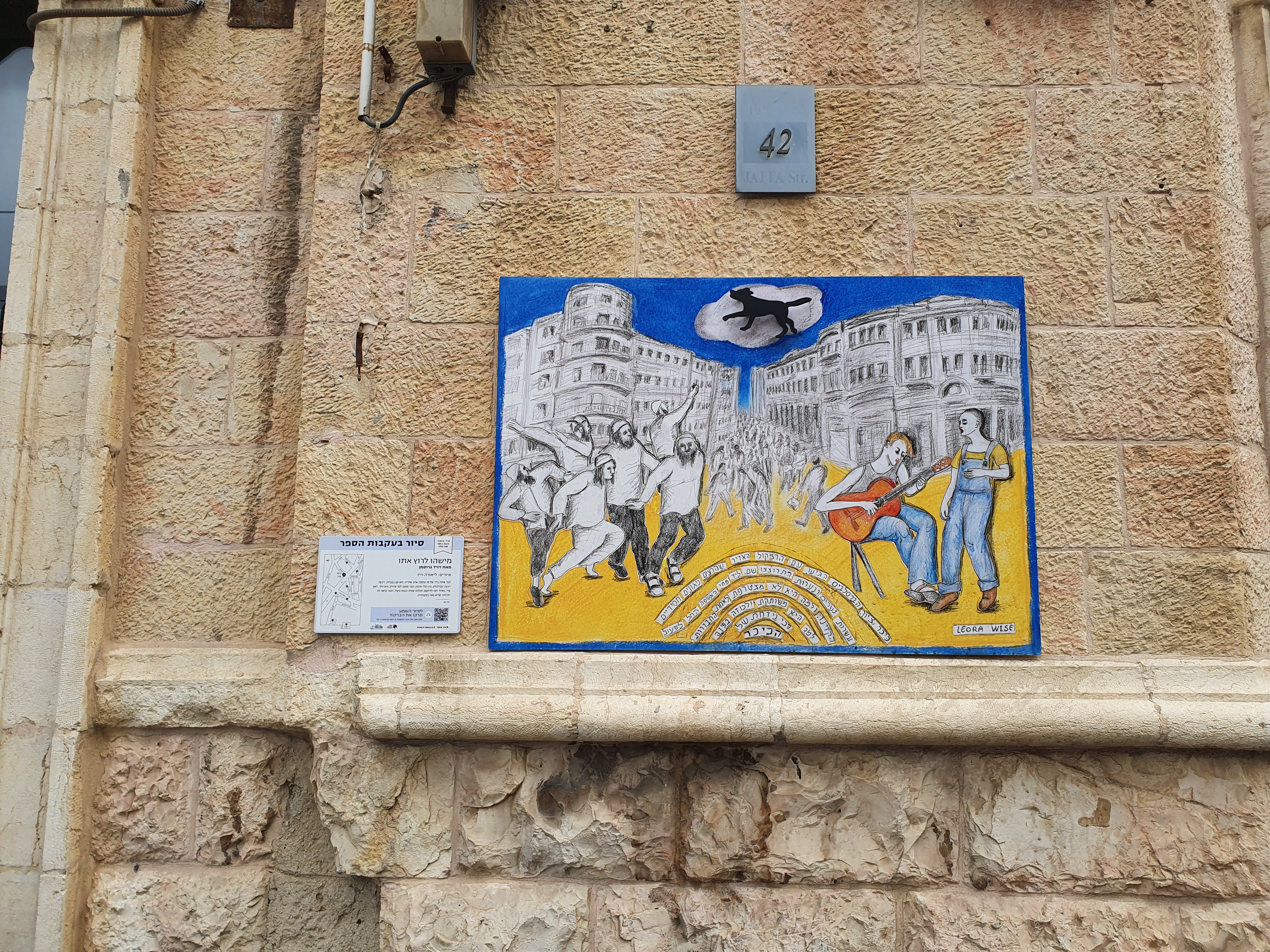
One of the street painting by Leora Wise, near Zion Square

Spread in a number of landmarks there are street-painting of the book's occurrences, as imagined by the artist Leora Weiss, in cooperation with the book's author, David Grossman.

== Reception ==
The book has received several reviews in international press.

The book was adapted into a film in 2006 of the same name.

In 2019, the media reported that the book was banned in Russia. However, the book has since been reprinted several times by major Russian publishers, most recently in 2025.
