= André Wilms =

French actor (1947–2022)

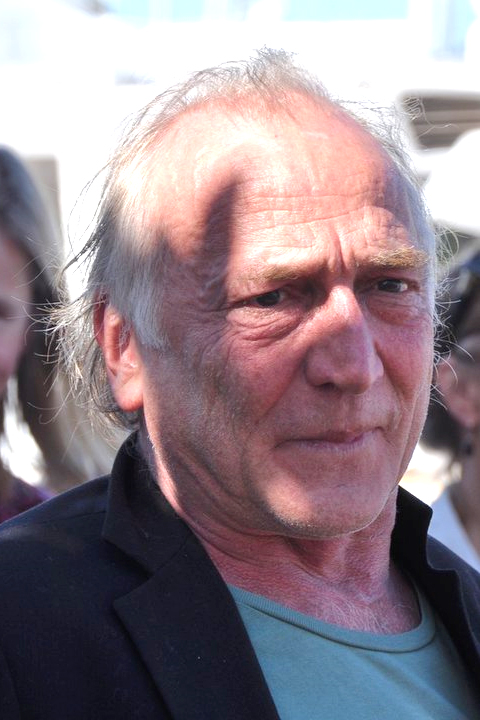
- Wilms in 2011
- Born: 29 April 1947; Strasbourg, France
- Died: 9 February 2022 (aged 74); Paris, France
- Occupations: Actor, theater director
- Years active: 1967–2022

André Wilms (29 April 1947 – 9 February 2022) was a French film, television actor and theater director who also appeared in German and Finnish films. Wilms was the winner of the Best Supporting European Actor award at the 1992 European Film Awards for his work in Aki Kaurismäki's La Vie de bohème. He died on 9 February 2022, at the age of 74.

== Theater ==
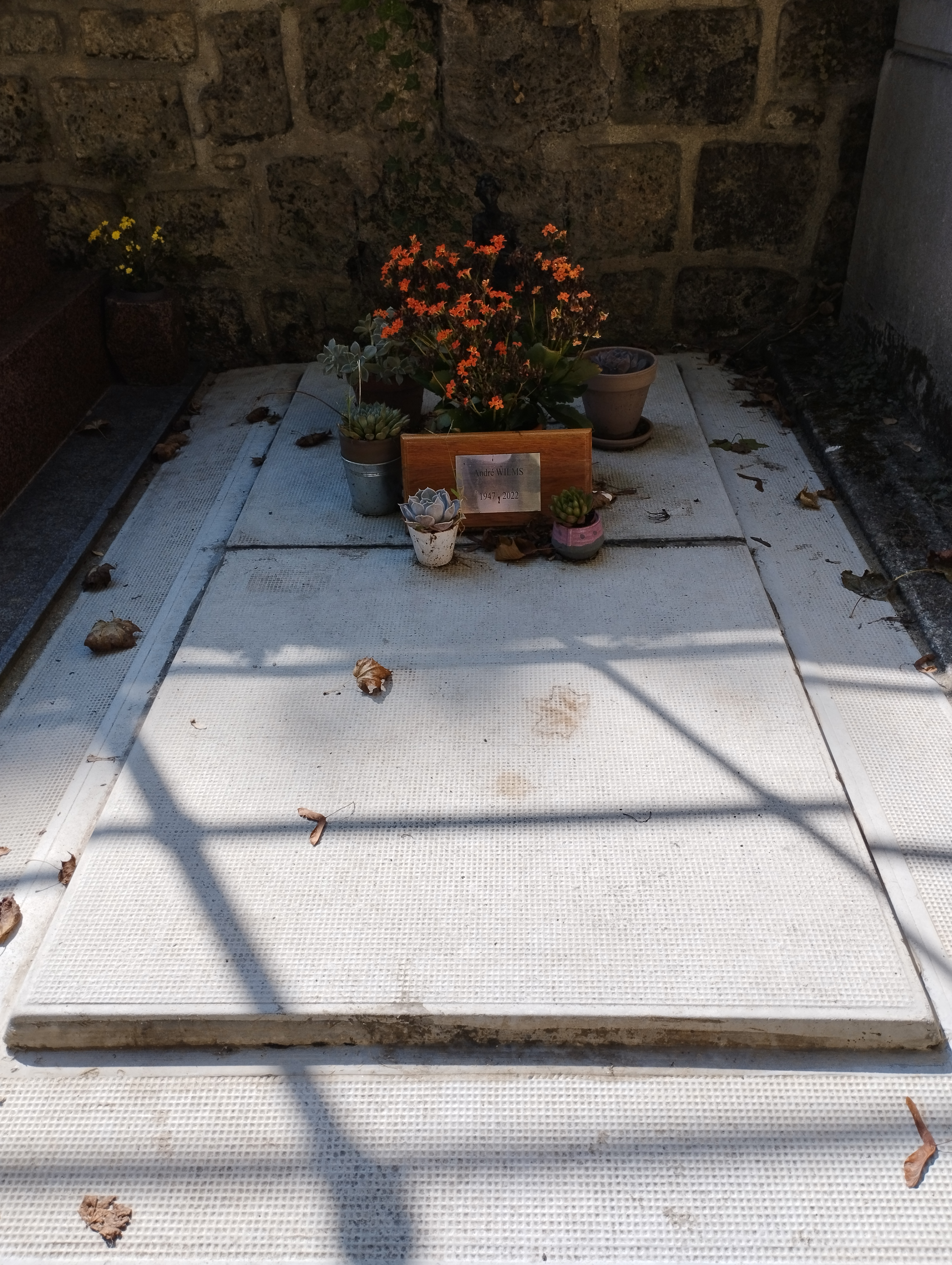
Tomb of André Wilms

Year	Title	Author	Director
1967	V comme Vietnam	Armand Gatti	Armand Gatti
1967	Chroniques d’une planète provisoire	Armand Gatti	Armand Gatti
1973	La Grotte d’Ali	Richard Demarcy	Richard Demarcy
1975	Faust-Salpétrière	Johann Wolfgang von Goethe	Klaus Michael Grüber
1975	Souvenir d’Alsace	Bruno Bayen & Yves Reynaud	Bruno Bayen & Yves Reynaud
1976	Baal	Bertolt Brecht	André Engel
1977	Franziska	Frank Wedekind	Agnès Laurent & Hélène Vincent
1977	Un week-end à Yaïck	Sergueï Essénine	André Engel
1977	Le Cheval qui se suicide par le feu	Armand Gatti	Armand Gatti
1977-78	Hölderlin : l’Antigone de Sophocle	Sophocles	Michel Deutsch & Philippe Lacoue-Labarthe
1979	Kafka théâtre complet	André Engel & Bernard Pautrat	André Engel
1979	Ils allaient obscurs sous la nuit solitaire	Samuel Beckett	André Engel
1980	Ruines	Michel Deutsch	Jean-Pierre Vincent
1980	Vichy-Fictions	Michel Deutsch	Jean-Pierre Vincent
1981-82	Le Palais de justice	Bernard Chartreux, Dominique Muller, Sylvie Muller & Jean-Pierre Vincent	Jean-Pierre Vincent
1982	The Phoenician Women	Euripides	Michel Deutsch & Philippe Lacoue-Labarthe
1983	Dernières nouvelles de la peste	Bernard Chartreux	Jean-Pierre Vincent
1984	Tartuffe	Molière	Jacques Lassalle
1984-85	Othello	William Shakespeare	Christian Colin
1985	Oedipus Rex	Sophocles	Alain Milianti
1986	Cyclops	Euripides	Bernard Sobel
1987	Faust et Rangda	Vincent Colin	Alain Milianti
1987	Paysage sous surveillance	Heiner Müller	Jean Jourdheuil & Jean-François Peyret
1988	La Route des chars	Heiner Müller	Jean Jourdheuil & Jean-François Peyret
1988	Happy Birthday to You	Olivier Cadiot	Georg Maria Pauen
1988	La Nuit des chasseurs	Georg Büchner	André Engel
1988	La Conférence des oiseaux	Jean-Claude Carrière	André Wilms
1989	Danton's Death	Georg Büchner	Klaus Michael Grüber
1989	Bluebeard's Castle	Béla Balázs	André Wilms
1989-90	Shakespeare's sonnets	William Shakespeare	Jean Jourdheuil & Jean-François Peyret
1990-91	De rerum natura	Lucretius	Jean Jourdheuil & Jean-François Peyret
1991	Aujourd’hui	Michel Deutsch	Michel Deutsch
1993-94	Le Château des Carpathes	Jorge Silva Melo & Philippe Hersant	André Wilms
1993-94	Ou bien le débarquement désastreux	Joseph Conrad, Heiner Müller & Francis Ponge	Heiner Goebbels
1996	Le Pôle	Vladimir Nabokov	Klaus Michael Grüber
1996	Imprécation IV	Michel Deutsch	Michel Deutsch
1996	La Cour des comédiens	Antoine Vitez	Georges Lavaudant
1997	A Doll's House	Henrik Ibsen	Deborah Warner
1997	Lettres à Franca	Louis Althusser	Olivier Corpet & Alain Trutat
1997	Des histoires vraies et autres histoires	Sophie Calle	Lucien Attoun & Jean-Louis Martinelli
1998-2000	Max Black	Max Black	Heiner Goebbels
1999	Imprécation 36	Michel Deutsch	Michel Deutsch
1999-2000	Pulsion	Franz Xaver Kroetz	André Wilms
2000	Medeamaterial	Heiner Müller	André Wilms
2001	The Book of Disquiet	Fernando Pessoa	Antonio Tabucchi
2002	Histoires de famille	Biljana Srbljanović	André Wilms
2003	Momo	Leigh Sauerwein	André Wilms
2003	Jeanne d'Arc au bûcher	Paul Claudel	Daniele Abbado
2004-06	Eraritjaritjaka	Elias Canetti	Heiner Goebbels
2005	The Bacchae	Euripides	André Wilms
2005-09	Max Black	Max Black	Heiner Goebbels
2006-07	The Cenci	Antonin Artaud	Georges Lavaudant
2007	Symposium	Plato	Juliette Deschamps
2007	The Threepenny Opera	Bertolt Brecht	André Wilms
2007	De Jarry à Jarry en passant par les îles	Alfred Jarry	Patrick Besnier & Hélène Delavault
2007-08	La Mort d’Hercule	Daniel Loayza	Georges Lavaudant
2008	Momo	Leigh Sauerwein	André Wilms
2008-09	Dieu comme patient	Matthias Langhoff	Matthias Langhoff
2009	The Bacchae	Euripides	André Wilms
2009	Eraritjaritjaka	Elias Canetti	Heiner Goebbels
2009	Roberto Zucco	Bernard-Marie Koltès	Georges Lavaudant
2009-10	L’Amante anglaise	Marguerite Duras	Marie-Louise Bischofberger
2010	Le Père	Heiner Müller	André Wilms
2010-14	Comment ai-je pu tenir là-dedans ?	Stéphane Blanquet & Jean Lambert-wild	Jean Lambert-wild
2011	Mille orphelins	Laurent Gaudé	Roland Auzet
2011	Macbeth Horror Suite	Carmelo Bene	Georges Lavaudant
2011-12	Momo	Leigh Sauerwein	André Wilms
2011-14	Qu’on me donne un ennemi	Heiner Müller	Mathieu Bauer
2012	Eraritjaritjaka	Elias Canetti	Heiner Goebbels
2012	La Poussière du temps	Theo Angelopoulos, Tonino Guerra & Petros Markaris	
2012-14	Max Black	Max Black	Heiner Goebbels
2013	Paroles d’acteurs	Ödön von Horváth	André Wilms
2013	Une vie minuscule	Pierre Michon	Andreas Schett
2014	Momo	Leigh Sauerwein	André Wilms
2015	Eraritjaritjaka	Elias Canetti	Heiner Goebbels
2016	Preparadise Sorry Now	Rainer Werner Fassbinder	André Wilms
2017	L’Homme au fond	Olivier de Solminihac	André Wilms
2017	Mort de Judas; Le point de vue de Ponce Pilate	Paul Claudel	André Wilms
2019-20	Secondhand Time: The Last of the Soviets	Svetlana Alexievich	Emmanuel Meirieu
2021	Pas dans le cul aujourd’hui	Jana Černá	André Wilms

== Filmography ==
=== Cinema ===
Year	Title	Role	Director	Notes
1981	Birgitt Haas Must Be Killed	Volker	Laurent Heynemann	
1981	Départ	The man	Dominique Loreau & Philippe Simon	Short
1983	Stella	Brosseau	Laurent Heynemann	
1984	Le tartuffe	Damis	Gérard Depardieu	
1985	Les poings fermés	Henri	Jean-Louis Benoît	
1987	I Photographia	Kristian	Nikos Papatakis	
1987	Field of Honor	The peddler	Jean-Pierre Denis	
1987	Une femme perdue de vue	The man	Manuela Gourary	Short
1988	The Reader	The man of the Saint-Landry street	Michel Deville	
1988	A Strange Place to Meet	Georges	François Dupeyron	
1988	Life Is a Long Quiet River	Jean Le Quesnoy	Étienne Chatiliez	
1989	Monsieur Hire	Inspector	Patrice Leconte	
1990	Tatie Danielle	Dr. Wilms	Étienne Chatiliez	
1990	Europa Europa	Robert Kellerman	Agnieszka Holland	
1990	Aventure de Catherine C.	André Leuwen	Pierre Beuchot	
1991	Isimeria	Archaeologist	Nikos Kornilios	
1992	Sexes faibles !	Gilles La Chesnay	Serge Meynard	
1992	La Vie de bohème	Marcel Marx	Aki Kaurismäki	
1992	La révolte des enfants	M. Alexis	Gérard Poitou-Weber	
1992	Coupable d'innocence ou quand la raison dort	Henri Bicken	Marcin Ziebinski	
1994	Hell	Doctor Arnoux	Claude Chabrol	
1994	Leningrad Cowboys Meet Moses	Lazar/Johnson/Elijah	Aki Kaurismäki	
1995	Iron Horsemen	André	Gilles Charmant	
1995	The Great White Man of Lambaréné	Albert Schweitzer	Bassek Ba Kobhio	
1996	Les derniers jours d'Emmanuel Kant	Wasianski	Philippe Collin	
1999	Juha	Shemeikka	Aki Kaurismäki	
2000	Scardanelli	Friedrich Hölderlin / Scardanelli	Harald Bergmann	
2001	Tanguy	The psychiatrist	Étienne Chatiliez	
2002	A Piece of Sky	Warden	Bénédicte Liénard	
2003	Brocéliande	Professor Vernet	Doug Headline	
2003	Welcome to the Roses	Daniel	Francis Palluau	
2004	La confiance règne	Chrystèle's father	Étienne Chatiliez	
2005	La bourde	The chief	Mathieu Demy	Short
2007	Le temps d'un regard	M. Jules	Ilan Flammer	
2009	Ricky	The doctor	François Ozon	
2009	La véritable histoire du Chat Botté	The ogre	Jérôme Deschamps, Pascal Hérold & Macha Makeïeff	Voice
2010	Pauline et François	Maurice	Renaud Fély	
2010	Sans laisser de traces	François Michelet	Grégoire Vigneron	
2011	Le Havre	Marcel Marx	Aki Kaurismäki	
2011	Americano	The German	Mathieu Demy	
2011	Roses à crédit	Monsieur Donelle	Amos Gitai	
2011	Robert Mitchum est mort	The Texan / Ströller	Olivier Babinet & Fred Kihn	
2011	La traversée	André	Bruno Deville	Short
2013	A Castle in Italy	André	Valeria Bruni Tedeschi	
2014	Pause	Fernand	Mathieu Urfer	
2014	Superegos	Curt Ledig	Benjamin Heisenberg	
2014	The Missionaries	Michel Chabrier	Tonie Marshall	
2015	Le combat ordinaire	Hubert Moret	Laurent Tuel	
2015	The Forbidden Room	Surgeon	Guy Maddin & Evan Johnson	
2015	Journey Through China	Richard Rousseau	Zoltan Mayer	
2015	Des millions de larmes	The man	Natalie Beder	Short
2015	Seul l'avenir nous le dira	André	Gilles Charmant	Short
2016	Marie et les naufragés	Cosmo	Sébastien Betbeder	
2016	Marie Curie: The Courage of Knowledge	Eugène Curie	Marie Noëlle	
2016	Cérémonie	The man	Patrick Guedj	Short
2016	T'es con Simon	Alain	Claire Barrault	Short
2016	Ce qui nous éloigne	Benoît	Hu Wei	Short
2017	Hannah	Hannah's Husband	Andrea Pallaoro	
2017	Just to Be Sure	Joseph Levkine	Carine Tardieu	
2017	Le fils de quelqu'un	Roger	Grégory Robin	Short
2018	Un juif pour l'exemple	Jacques Chessex	Jacob Berger	
2018	The Most Assassinated Woman in the World	Eugène	Franck Ribière	
2019	Lune de miel	Gilbert Breit	Élise Otzenberger	
2019	Debout sur la montagne	The priest	Sébastien Betbeder	
2019	Wie ich lernte, bei mir selbst Kind zu sein	Uncle Louis	Rupert Henning	
2019	Mémorable	Louis	Bruno Collet	Short
2020	Une belle équipe	Grandpa	Mohamed Hamidi	
2020	The Salt of Tears	Luc's father	Philippe Garrel	
2020	Personne ne manque	The father	Franck Guérin	Short
2022	Maigret	Kaplan	Patrice Leconte	

=== Television ===
Year	Title	Role	Director	Notes
1970	Der Übergang über den Ebro	Luis	Armand Gatti	TV movie
1980	Gueule d'atmosphère	Siurg	Maurice Chateau	TV movie
1982	Flucht aus Pommern	Armand	Eberhard Schubert	TV movie
1987	La tricheuse	Marvier	Joyce Buñuel	TV movie
1989	Liberté, Libertés	Malseigne	Jean-Dominique de La Rochefoucauld	TV movie
1989	David Lansky	Brunoy	Hervé Palud	TV mini-series
1989	Opération Mozart	Guillot	Jean-Louis Bertuccelli	TV series (1 episode)
1997	Compagnons secrets	Crabe	Pierre Beuchot	TV movie
2009	L'école du pouvoir	Uncle Jean	Raoul Peck	TV movie
2011	Petite fille	The father	Laetitia Masson	TV movie
2012	Yann Piat, chronique d'un assassinat	Maurice Arreckx	Antoine de Caunes	TV movie
2017	Aurore	Maya's father	Laetitia Masson	TV mini-series
2021	La bonne conduite	Serge	Arnaud Bedouët	TV movie

== Awards and nominations ==
Year	Award	Nominated work	Result
1992	European Film Award for Best Supporting Actor	La Vie de bohème	Won
2011	European Film Award for Best Actor	Le Havre	Nominated
2012	Lumière Award for Best Actor	Le Havre	Nominated
2015	Trophees Francophones du Cinema for Best Supporting Actor	Pause	Nominated
2021	International Cinephile Society Award for Best Supporting Actor	The Salt of Tears	Nominated
