= Sick joke =

Sick joke may refer to:

- Sick comedy
- Black comedy
- "Sick Joke", 1988 song by Doom from War Crimes (Inhuman Beings)
- "Sick Joke", 2020 song by Neck Deep from All Distortions Are Intentional
