= DBJ =

DBJ or dbj may refer to:

- Development Bank of Japan, a Japanese development bank
- Darcy Byrne-Jones, an Australian footballer
- dbj, the ISO 639-3 code for Ida'an language, Sabah, Malaysia

Abbreviation for Dead baby jokes, frequently used in the Dead baby joke community
