= Marc Goldberg (playwright) =

French theatre director

- Born: 1968 (age 57–58); Paris, France
- Occupations: Theatre director; playwright; translator

Marc Goldberg is a French theatre director, playwright, actor, and translator.

== Biography ==
Goldberg studied Philosophy before joining the Compagnie des Théâtrophages and his first play, Les Rendez-vous, was staged in 1993.

As a theatre director, Goldberg has staged around 25 shows, including Le Bébé by Marie Darrieussecq with pop icon Lio, A Woman of Mystery by John Cassavetes with Myriam Boyer which he translated from English to French, and Anthology of Black Humor by André Breton with Bernard Menez and Patrick d'Asumçao.

His play Frickstein's Pillar was selected by the Comédie-Française reading committee.

Goldberg has been an assistant professor at ENSATT and Sciences Po before moving to Singapore in 2013, where he has been part-time Lecturer at Nanyang Academy of Fine Arts and Lasalle College of the Arts.

He was the first to translate and stage Singapore plays in French, for the Singapore Festival in France 2015: Emily of Emerald Hill by Stella Kon and The Coffin Is Too Big For The Hole by Kuo Pao Kun. Both translations were published in France by Editions Les Cygnes.

Since moving to Singapore, he has been working closely with Jean Lambert-wild, creating Swamps Clown at 72-13 (TheatreWorks' venue) in 2016 and a poetical karaoke during the 2017 Voilah! festival.

His play Scents of Josephine was staged by Samzy Jo at the Drama Center Black Box in 2017.

In 2019, he wrote the dialogues and co-wrote the script of The Brook's Clown, a graphic-photo-novel designed by Koh Hong Teng and published by Achates 360. The album was nominated for Book of the Year and Best Book Cover Design at the 2020 Singapore Book Awards. It won the Publication Gold Medal and the Illustration And Type Gold Medal at the 2020 Hong Kong Design Awards.

He has staged The Veil of Happiness by Georges Clemenceau, with incidental music Gabriel Fauré, at the Ngee Ann Kongsi Theatre in Singapore, with Lim Yu-Beng, Janice Koh, Hossan Leong and Remesh Panicker in the main roles, for the opening of the 2020 Voilah! Festival.

== Main shows ==
- 1998 : Bastien und Bastienne by W. A. Mozart
- 1999 : Delphine et Noémie
- 2000 : Toute seule by Delphine Lacouque
- 2001 : Carmen et Luis by Marc Goldberg
- 2001 : Douce Violence by Raphaël Scheer
- 2001 : Trans-Atlantique by Witold Gombrowicz
- 2002 : Dieu me pardonne ! adapted from medieval Muslim poets
- 2002 : Le Jeu d'Adam and La Farce du cuvier
- 2003 : Un caprice de Bonaparte by Stefan Zweig
- 2003 : Le Café des roses by Carine Lacroix
- 2004 : Le Bébé by Marie Darrieussecq
- 2006 : Le Roux dans la bergerie by Raphaël Scheer
- 2006 : A Woman of Mystery by John Cassavetes
- 2007 : Hors forfait by Delphine Lacouque et Noémie and Lattre
- 2008 : Anthologie de l'humour noir d'André Breton
- 2014 : Le fils de mon père est le père de mon fils, ou Mais que faisais-tu ? by Bertrand Marie Flourez
- 2015 : Emilie d'Emerald Hill by Stella Kon and Le cercueil est trop grand pour la fosse by Kuo Pao Kun
- 2015 : Lower Depths by Maxim Gorky
- 2016 : Le Clown des Marais by Jean Lambert-wild (co-created with Jean Lambert-wild)
- 2016 : In the Company of Women by Verena Tay
- 2017 : Chalk Circle[s], adapted from Chalk Circle by Li Qianfu and The Caucasian Chalk Circle by Bertold Brecht, in Mandarin and English
- 2017 : Further North, Deepest South by Chong Tze Chien
- 2020 : The Veil of Happiness by Georges Clemenceau
- 2020 : La Chanson de Roland, with Jean Lambert-wild and Lorenzo Malaguerra

== Main texts ==
- 1992 : Les Rendez-vous staged by Fabrice de la Patellière and Alexandre de la Patellière
- 2003 : Avec douleur, s'il vous plaît ! staged by Marc Goldberg
- 2009 : La Colonne de Frickstein, published by Éditions Les Cygnes
- 2017 : Scents of Josephine staged by Samzy Jo
- 2019 : The Brook's Clown, with Koh Hong Teng and Jean Lambert-wild, published by Achates 360
- 2019 : Les Cocottes en Sucettes, staged by Lorenzo Malaguerra

== Main translations ==
- 1996 : Cahier Bleu and Cahier Brun by Ludwig Wittgenstein, with Jérôme Sackur, published by Gallimard
- 2006 : A Woman of Mystery by John Cassavetes, with Louise Vincent
- 2014 : Les Troyennes by Mark Ravenhill, published by Les Solitaires Intempestifs
- 2015 : Deux Monologues Singapouriens, Emilie d'Emerald Hill by Stella Kon and Le cercueil est trop grand pour la fosse by Kuo Pao Kun, published by Éditions Les Cygnes
- 2017 : Aegri Somnia by Jean Lambert-wild
- 2017 : Hors du Sommeil et de l'Ombre and La Nuit de Simhat Torah by Peter Barnes, with Gisèle Joly, public reading at Théâtre Nouvelle Génération in Lyon
- 2017 : The Reunification of the two Koreas by Joël Pommerat, staged reading by Jacques Vincey at 72-13 for the 2017 Voilah! festival
- 2020 : La Chanson de Roland, with Jean Lambert-wild, published by Les Solitaires Intempestifs

== Main roles ==
- 2012 : The Professor in Un destin résolument moderne by David Ajchenbaum (theatre)
- 2014 : William Farquhar in Lines Divide by Kent Chan (art video)
- 2014 : D^{r} Barak Al Hadad in Firasat, season 1 et 2, on Mediacorp Suria (TV series)
- 2015: William in Selfie de Mikael Teo (feature movie)
- 2016 : Smusse in Swamps Clown (theatre)
- 2016 : Mr Boyce in Crimewatch, episode 3 on Mediacorp (TV series)
- 2017 : Emilio in Menantu International, season 2, episode 8 and 9, on Mediacorp Suria (TV series)
- 2019 : Doktor Graff in Les Cocottes en Sucettes, Théâtre du Crochetan in Switzerland
