= Marc Goldberg =

Marc or Mark Goldberg may refer to:

- Marc Wallice (Marc Stephen Goldberg, born 1959), American porn actor
- Mark Goldberg (football manager), English football club chairman and manager
- Mark Goldberg (politician), American lawyer and politician from New York.
- Marc Goldberg, American bassoonist with the New York Woodwind Quintet
- Marc Goldberg (playwright) (born 1968), French playwright and theatre director
