= Patrick d'Assumçao =

French actor (born 1959)

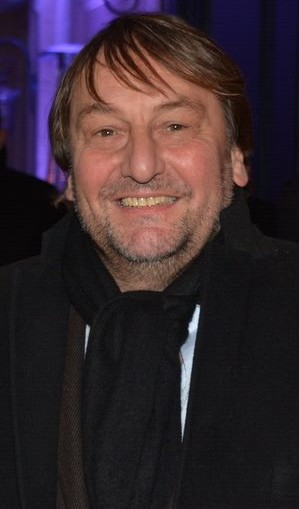
- d'Assumçao in 2016
- Born: 1 June 1959 (age 67); Nantes, Loire-Atlantique, France
- Occupation: Actor
- Years active: 1991–present

Patrick d'Assumçao (born 1 June 1959) is a French actor.

== Theatre ==
Year	Title	Author	Director
1991	Le Métro fantôme	Leroy Jones	Pierre Barayre
1992	Dernier Hôtel avant la Pentecôte	Gilles Tourman	Marc Lesage
1993	Ten Little Niggers	Agatha Christie	Marc Lesage
1993	The Moods of Marianne	Alfred de Musset	Marc Lesage
1993–95	Thomas More ou l'Homme libre	Jean Anouilh	Jean-Luc Jeener
1994	Strange Case of Dr Jekyll and Mr Hyde	Robert Louis Stevenson	Marc Lesage
1995	No Exit	Jean-Paul Sartre	Pascal Parsat
1995	La Fortune de Gaspard	Countess of Ségur	Marc Lesage
1995	Les Trente Millions de Gladiator	Eugène Labiche	Marc Lesage
1996	Sniping Zone	Benoît Marbot	Benoît Marbot
1997	Voix off	Marc Lesage	Marc Lesage
1997	Comédie	Samuel Beckett	Pierre Clémenti
1997	Ultime Instance	Benoît Marbot	Benoît Marbot
1998	Antigone	Jean Anouilh	Jean Menaud
1998	The Imaginary Invalid	Molière	Marc Lesage
1999	Voulez-vous jouer avec moâ ?	Marcel Achard	Gérard Coeurdevey
1999	Letter from an Unknown Woman	Stefan Zweig	Didier Weill
2000	Lethal Romance	Jocelyne Sauvard	Kazem Shahryari
2001	L'Imprésario de Smyrne	Carlo Goldoni	Didier Weill
2001	La nuit est mère du jour	Lars Norén	Vincent Ecrepont
2002	Tartuffe	Molière	Didier Weill
2002	Torquemada	Victor Hugo	Christian Fregnet
2003	La Ronde	Arthur Schnitzler	Didier Weill
2003	La Putain respectueuse	Jean-Paul Sartre	Didier Weill
2003–04	Una estrella	Paloma Pedrero	Panchika Velez
2005	Boudard Song	Stéphane Grisard	Stéphane Grisard
2005–06	Commentariolum Petitionis	Quintus Tullius Cicero	Christian Fregnet
2005–09	The Seven Days of Simon Labrosse	Carole Fréchette	Charlotte Blanchard
2006	Le Roux dans la bergerie	Raphael Scheer	Marc Goldberg
2006–08	Histoire de vivre	Nathalie Saugeon	Catherine Hauseux
2008	Anthology of Black Humor	André Breton	Marc Goldberg
2009–10	Donogoo	Jules Romains	Jean-Paul Tribout
2010–14	Caligula	Albert Camus	Stéphane Olivié-Bisson
2010–15	One Flew Over the Cuckoo's Nest	Dale Wasserman	Stéphane Daurat
2013–14	Rhinoceros	Eugène Ionesco	Stéphane Daurat
2014	L’Univers démasqué... ou presque	Bénédicte Mayer	Stéphanie Lanier
2014–15	Zone rouge	Thierry Jahn	Thierry Jahn
2014–15	Le fils de mon père est le père de mon fils	Bertrand Marie Flourez	Marc Goldberg
2015	En roue libre	Penelope Skinner	Claudia Stavisky
2022–24	Le Syndrome de l’oiseau	Pierre Tré-Hardy	Sara Giraudeau & Renaud Meyer

== Filmography ==
Year	Title	Role	Director	Notes
2000	L'alexandrophagie	Crémieux	Sylvain Gillet	Short
2007	Paris Criminal Investigations	The locksmith	Bertrand Van Effenterre	TV series (1 episode)
2010	Coursier	The barman	Hervé Renoh	
2010	Tant que tu respires	Oscar	Fara Sene	Short
2013	Stranger by the Lake	Henri	Alain Guiraudie	Nominated - César Award for Best Supporting Actor
2014	Mathieu	Pierre	Massimiliano Camaiti	Short
2014	La loi	Lucien Neuwirth	Christian Faure	TV movie
2015	Floride	Man in pavilion	Philippe Le Guay	
2015	Les Ogres	Marion's lover	Léa Fehner	
2015	Land Legs	Dom's Boss	Samuel Collardey	
2015	A Childhood	The teacher	Philippe Claudel	
2015	All About Them	William	Jérôme Bonnell	
2015	My Golden Days	The Monk	Arnaud Desplechin	
2015	Diary of a Chambermaid	Captain Mauger	Benoît Jacquot	
2015	The Very Private Life of Mister Sim	The neighbor	Michel Leclerc	
2015	Punk à chien	Michel	Rémi Mazet	Short
2015	So Let Them Be	Father Chalumeau	Rodolphe Tissot	TV series (6 episodes)
2016	Arctic Heart	Philippe	Marie Madinier	
2016	Le chant du merle	M. Verlhac	Frédéric Pelle	
2016	The Death of Louis XIV	Fagon	Albert Serra	
2016	Iceberg	M. Elys	Mathieu Z'Graggen	Short
2016	Après Suzanne	The doctor	Félix Moati	Short
2016	Les âmes en peine	The monk	Eric Rouquette	Short
2017	Primaire	M. Sabatier	Hélène Angel	
2017	Nos patriotes	Pierre Lagrange	Gabriel Le Bomin	
2017	Je n'ai pas tué Jesse James	Jesse James	Sophie Beaulieu	Short
2017	Guyane	Merlot	Kim Chapiron	TV series (1 episode)
2018	Fortuna	Mr. Blanchet	Germinal Roaux	
2018	Deux fils	Alfred	Félix Moati	
2018	The Apparition	Father Borrodine	Xavier Giannoli	
2018	Daniel fait face	The baker	Marine Atlan	
2018	Naked Normandy	Maurice	Philippe Le Guay	
2018	Le pont du diable	Philippe Charras	Sylvie Ayme	TV movie
2018	Nox	Ferrara	Mabrouk El Mechri	TV series (3 episodes)
2019	Back Home	Michel	Jessica Palud	
2019	I Lost My Body	Gigi	Jérémy Clapin	
2019	Someone, Somewhere	Monsieur Pelletier	Cédric Klapisch	
2019	Plot	Raymond	Sébastien Auger	Short
2019	Yasmina	Jeannot	Claire Helene Cahen & Ali Esmili	Short
2019	Le président et le garde-barrière	M. Radeau	Jean-Marc Peyrefitte	Short
2019	Twice Upon a Time	André	Guillaume Nicloux	TV mini-series
2019	Marianne	Father Xavier	Samuel Bodin	TV series (8 episodes)
2020	Papa Rapido	Gustave	Enya Baroux	Short
2020–21	Cheyenne & Lola	Yannick	Eshref Reybrouck	TV series (8 episodes)
2021	Les héroïques	Jean-Pierre	Maxime Roy	
2021	Coeurs vaillants	The monk	Mona Achache	
2021	The Man in the Basement	Monsieur Leroux	Philippe Le Guay	
2021	L'inspection	Inspector	Frédéric Bas & Caroline Brami	Short
2021	Les aventures du jeune Voltaire	Lieutenant General	Alain Tasma	TV mini-series
2021	Paris Police 1900	Inspector Puybaraud	Julien Despaux, Frédéric Balekdjian, ...	TV series (8 episodes)
2022	Selon la police	Serge Laborderie	Frédéric Videau	
2022	Le tigre et le président	Etienne Radeau	Jean-Marc Peyrefitte	
2022	Loulou	Jean-Luc	Émilie Noblet	TV movie
2022	Qu'est-ce qu'elle a ma famille?	Eric	Hélène Angel	TV movie
2023	Magnificat	Dr. Grammel	Virginie Sauveur	
2023	À la belle étoile	Pascal	Sébastien Tulard	
2023	Jeanne du Barry	Choiseul	Maïwenn	
2023	The Taste of Things	Grimaud	Tran Anh Hung	
2023	La fille qu'on appelle	Franck Bellec	Charlène Favier	TV movie
2023	Class Act	Jean-Baptiste Tapie	Tristan Séguéla	TV mini-series
2023	Sous contrôle	The driver	Erwan Le Duc	TV mini-series
TBA	Une amitié dangereuse	Ornano	Alain Tasma	TV mini-series Post-Production
TBA	Le domaine		Giovanni Aloi	Filming
