= Little Willie rhymes =

Joke cycle

Little Willie rhymes are light verses including an indifferent or cheerfully inappropriate response to a gruesome act of violence in a quatrain form attributed to Harry Graham (1874-1936). The earliest was included among the Ruthless Rhymes for Heartless Homes published in 1898 under Graham's pen name Col. D. Streamer while he was serving in the Coldstream Guards.

Billy, in one of his nice new sashes,
Fell in the fire and was burnt to ashes;
Now, although the room grows chilly,
I haven’t the heart to poke poor Billy.

The above meter and line length, often with rhyme scheme AABB., was subsequently relaxed with alternative rhyming scheme ABAB as illustrated by the following verse from a 1904 collection of Willie Ballads:

Willie walking on the track,
The engine gave the worst of squeals,
And then they turned the engine back
And scraped off Willie from the wheels.

This genre of poetic black humor remained popular into the 21st century. The Washington Post ran a contest in 2011 encouraging readers to compose examples.

== See also ==
- Cruel jokes
