= A Childhood =

- Film poster
- Directed by: Philippe Claudel
- Written by: Philippe Claudel
- Produced by: Margaret Ménégoz
- Starring: Alexi Mathieu; Angélica Sarre; Pierre Deladonchamps; Jules Gauzelin; Patrick d'Assumçao
- Cinematography: Denis Lenoir
- Edited by: Isabelle Devinck
- Production companies: Les Films du Losange; France 3 Cinéma
- Distributed by: Les Films du Losange
- Release date: 23 September 2015
- Running time: 100 minutes
- Country: France
- Language: French
- Budget: $4 million
- Box office: $961.273

A Childhood (French: Une Enfance) is a 2015 French drama film written and directed by Philippe Claudel.

== Plot ==
Jimmy is 13 years old and lives in a small dilapidated town in eastern France. At a young age, he has to stand on his own feet and assume the primary care role for his younger brother Kévin. During the summer, Jimmy is forced to grow up quickly as he hovers between his errant mother and his domineering criminal stepfather.

== Cast ==
- Alexi Mathieu as Jimmy
- Angélica Sarre as Pris
- Pierre Deladonchamps as Duke
- Jules Gauzelin as Kévin
- Patrick d'Assumçao as The teacher
- Fayssal Benbahmed as Mouss
- Catherine Matisse as Lila
- Lola Dubois as Lison
- Philippe Claudel as The tennis coach

== Production ==
Filming took place from 9 June 2014 til 1 August.

== Reception ==
It received the Best Film Award at the Chicago International Film Festival.
