= Pause (2014 film) =

2014 film

- Film poster
- Directed by: Mathieu Urfer
- Written by: Mathieu Urfer
- Produced by: Elodie Brunner; Thierry Spicher; Elena Tatti
- Starring: Baptiste Gilliéron
- Cinematography: Timo Salminen
- Edited by: Yannick Leroy
- Music by: Mathieu Urfer; John Woolloff; Marcin de Morsier; Ariel Garcia
- Production companies: Box Productions sàrl RSI Radiotelevisione svizzera
- Release date: 14 August 2014 (Locarno)
- Running time: 82 minutes
- Country: Switzerland
- Language: French

Pause is a 2014 Swiss comedy film written and directed by Mathieu Urfer. It follows a young singer-songwriter whose relationship is thrown into crisis. The film was one of seven shortlisted as the Swiss candidate for the Best Foreign Language Film at the 88th Academy Awards, and won awards at Swiss and international film festivals.

== Synopsis ==
Sami, a young Swiss singer-songwriter, is content with a life of few ambitions until his partner asks for a break in their relationship. With the help of a friend, an older musician living in a retirement home, he tries to win her back with a newly composed love song.

== Cast ==
The cast includes:

- Baptiste Gilliéron as Sami
- Julia Faure as Julia
- André Wilms as Fernand
- Nils Althaus as Lionel
- Roland Vouilloz as Marc Rivette
- Nicole Letuppe as Sarah

== Production ==
Pause was Urfer’s first feature film. Urfer said the film was an opportunity to depict a musician’s fantasy in which music could help bring a desperate situation to a happy conclusion.

== Reception ==
=== Awards and nominations ===
In 2014, Pause received awards including a special mention at the Festival International du Film d'Arras. At the 2015 Swiss Film Awards, it won Best Film Score and was nominated for Best Fiction Film, Best Actor, and Best Performance in a Supporting Role.

The film was one of seven shortlisted as the Swiss candidate for the Best Foreign Language Film at the 88th Academy Awards, but Iraqi Odyssey was selected as Switzerland’s submission.

=== Critical response ===
Filmdienst described the film as a gentle tragicomedy with enjoyable music and likeable performances that, while not probing very deeply, was nevertheless entertaining. Variety described it as an “otherwise flavorless feel-good pic”, while suggesting that Urfer’s directorial abilities exceeded what the screenplay allowed. Filmbulletin described the film as a very charming, featherlight relationship comedy of quiet tones. Cineuropa described the film as a “refreshing comedy” and wrote that its retro setting gave it a modern feel.

== Festival screenings ==
The film was screened at festivals including the 67th Locarno International Film Festival, the 29th Festival international du film francophone de Namur, and the 2014 Quebec City Film Festival in 2014, and the 50th Solothurner Filmtage and the 33rd Filmfest München in 2015.
