= Dead baby jokes =

Series of dark comedy jokes

Dead baby jokes are a joke cycle reflecting dark comedy. The joke is presented in riddle form, beginning with a what question and concluded with a grotesque punch line answer.

== History ==
According to the folklorist scholar Alan Dundes, the dead baby joke cycle likely began in the early 1960s. Dundes theorizes that the origin of the dead baby joke lies in the rise of second-wave feminism in the U.S. during that decade and its rejection of the traditional societal role for women, which included support for legalized abortion and contraceptives. It has also been suggested that the jokes emerged in response to images of graphic violence, often involving infants, from the Vietnam War.

== Examples ==
What's the difference between a truckload of dead babies and a truckload of bowling balls?
You can’t unload bowling balls with a pitchfork.

What's more fun than nailing a baby to a post?
Ripping it off again.

What's bright blue, pink, and sizzles?
A baby breastfeeding on an electrical outlet.

How do you get 100 dead babies into a box?
With a blender!

How do you get them out of the box?
With nacho chips!

How many babies does it take to paint a house?
Depends on how hard you throw them.

Why did the dead baby cross the road?
Because it was stapled to the chicken.

What is sadder than a dead baby nailed to a tree?
A dead baby nailed to a puppy.

== See also ==
- The Aristocrats
- Black comedy
- Infanticide
- Sick comedy
- Cruel jokes
