= Stéphane Blanquet =

French contemporary artist (born 1973)

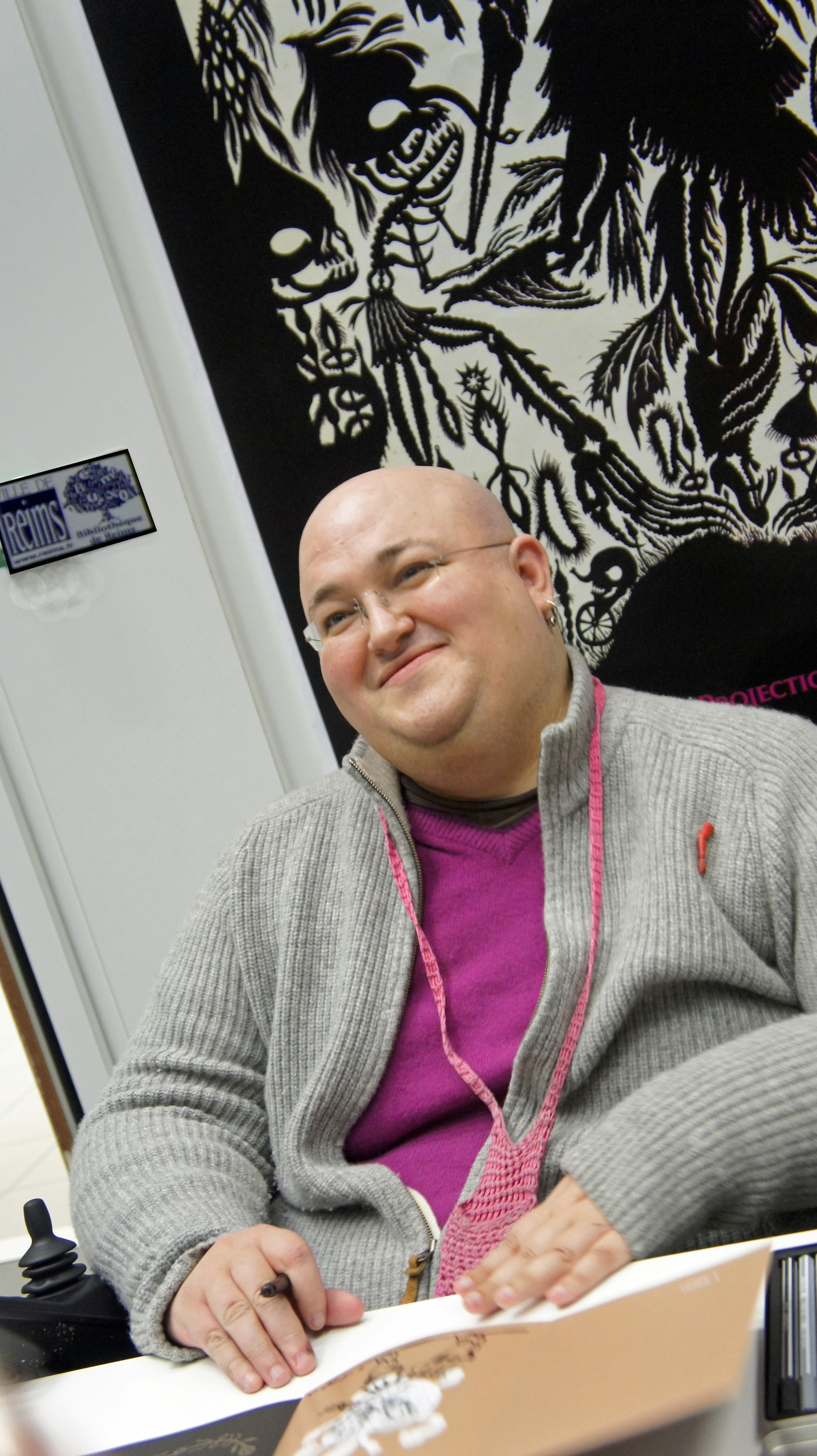

Stéphane Blanquet (born 1973, near Paris, France) is a French multimedia artist. He has been a prolific figure in the contemporary art scene since the late 1980s.

== Biography ==
=== Contemporary art ===
Stéphane Blanquet's works include graphzines, art installations, urban art and animation movies. He has also been involved in theater, books, publishing and art direction.

As a child, he watched the movie Creature from the Black Lagoon and this had a strong impact on him, stimulating an interest in popular culture, including illustrated magazines, joke shops, magic tricks, optical illusions and fairground art.

In the 1990s, Blanquet was very active both as an artist and a publisher and became one of the leaders of the underground art scene. His art was exhibited at the Regard Moderne gallery in Paris in 1993, and in 1996 in the USA and in Canada. It has been published in Blab! (USA), AX (Japan) and in Europe. In 1996, he received the prestigious Alph Art du Fanzine prize at the Angoulême International Comics Festival for his work as a publisher.

In 2001, a major retrospective of his work was displayed at the Maison de la culture de Tournai (Belgium). It was followed by solo and group shows throughout the decade: Blab! Exhibition in San Diego (US) and at the Luzerne Museum (Switzerland), the Cult Fiction exhibition at the Hayward Gallery in London and other UK venues, and solo shows in Fumetto (Luzerne, Switzerland) and Aix-en-Provence (France).

In 2008, he created an outdoor mural for the Kabinett Passage in the Museumsquartier in Vienna, Austria. It was his first foray into urban art.

In 2009, he presented an installation at the "Quintet" exhibition at the Musée d'Art Contemporain of Lyon.

In 2010, he spent 3 weeks in Japan, where he had a solo show at the Span Art Gallery in Tokyo and participated in various events.

He also presented installations in Singapore: in 2012, Distorted forest at the Night Lights festival; and, in 2013, the Glossy Dreams in Depths installation at the Singapore Art Museum, which was seen by 100,000 visitors.

=== Animation movies ===
In 1997, he went into animation movies and made Le mélange des couleurs for the French broadcasting company Canal +. In 2005, the Les réanimations DVD, which contained all his animation movies to date, was released. In 2012, he was invited by the university Sup Info Com Arles to create a movie, Cornea, with a team of students. The movie was later shown at numerous festivals and exhibitions (in 2014, at the Museum of Fine Arts of Boston - US).

=== Graphic novels ===
In 2001, his first graphic novel La nouvelle aux pis was published by Cornélius. It was followed by numerous other publications: Le Noir Seigneur, Bouquet Bonheur, Chochottes ...

In 2007, a second graphic novel La Vénéneuse aux deux éperons was published, again by Cornélius. It was chosen as one of the 10 most aesthetically outstanding books published in France that year (Concours des plus beaux livres français). Various titles have been published in Japan, the USA, Spain, Italy, Brazil, etc.

=== Art for a younger audience ===
From 2002 onward, he started creating works aimed at a younger audience. He illustrated demanding texts for important French publishing companies, for example: La vieille Chéchette by Louise Michel (2006 - Albin Michel), The Snow Queen by Hans Christian Andersen (2010 - Gallimard). He also created installations and artworks: in 2013, in Singapore, he exhibited an installation at the Art Garden festival for children and families, organized by the Singapore Art Museum.

=== Theater ===
In 2005, he met Jean Lambert-wild. It was the beginning of a long and fruitful collaboration in theater. At the Comédie de Caen, a French national theater, he worked on stage and costume design, play writing and direction. In 2008, the play he co-authored and co-designed Comment ai-je pu tenir là-dedans was very successful at the Festival d'Avignon and has been shown 200 times including in Japan and Korea. He is now working on a new play adapted from Shakespeare's Richard III.

=== Art direction ===
In 2007, he was appointed "Ocular Director", a sort of art director, responsible for the image and the visual branding for the Comédie de Caen. He created a strong image and his work has helped increase the number of visitors (x3 in 5 years). Today, he is the art director in charge of the Théâtre de l'Union, Limoges, where he has followed Jean Lambert-Wild.

=== Publishing ===
Since 2007, with the publishing house United Dead Artists, he published monographs (Roland Topor, Gary Panter, Tanaami Keiichi…), magazines (Tendon Revolver, Muscle Carabine, Tranchée Racine…) and art objects under the brand United Dead Toys. He published the work of about 200 artists in some 100 publications. The magazine Tranchée Racine has a print-run of 4,000. He also created a newsstand to present the publications which is regularly shown in museums and cultural centres.

=== Collaboration ===
Recently, he started working with commercial companies. In 2014, he created for Paramount Pictures an artwork that was used to promote the new Teenage Mutant Ninja Turtle movie. He also set a foot in fashion: he worked with the Belgium fashion brand KRJST.

== Achievements ==
=== Main exhibitions and installations ===
- Singapore Art Museum (Singapore), Glossy Dreams in Depths, large scale installation, 2013
- Night Lights Singapore (Singapore), Distorted forest, large scale night time installation, 2012
- Museum of Narrative Arts (San Diego, US), Survey Select: A Narrative Art Exhibition, 2010
- Musée d'Art Contemporain MAC Lyon (Lyon, France), Quintet, large-scale installation, 2009
- Marianna Kistler Beach Museum of Art (Manhattan, Kansas, US), Blab! Retrospective, 2008
- Musée des Arts Décoratifs (Paris, France), Toy Comics, 2007
- Hayward Gallery (London, UK), Cult Fiction, travelling group show, 2007
- Périscopages (Rennes, France), Exposition Blanquet aux Ateliers du Vent, 2005
- Festival international de BD de Sierre (Sierre, Switzerland), Chambre avec vue sur mes cauchemars (1^{st} version), 2004

=== Solo shows ===
- MAD 2015, Multiple Art Days at La Maison Rouge, Paris, France, 2015
- Galerie Arts Factory (Paris, France), Vide Point . Rose Trou, 2014
- Maison des Arts (Evreux, France), 2014
- Musée de l'Erotisme (Paris, France), Rendez-vous moi en toi, 2013
- Médiathèque Jean Falala + 3 other venues (Reims, France), Mâchoires Noires, 2012
- WHARF, Center for Contemporary Art (Caen, France), Le boyau noir, 2012
- Span Art Gallery (Tokyo, Japan), Blanquet plagues Tokyo, 1^{st} round, 2012
- Galerie Arts Factory (Paris, France), Blanquet s'ouvre la panse, 2007
- Chapelle des Pénitents Blancs (Aix en Provence, France), Labyrinthique intestinale, 2006
- Les Caniches Modernes (Troyes, France), 2006
- Médiathèque Hermeland (Saint-Herblain, France), 2006
- Maison de la Culture et des Loisirs (Gérardmer, France), 2005
- Kapelica Gallery (Ljubljana, Slovenia), Črvivo jabolko, 2004
- La mauvaise réputation (Bordeaux, France), Exposition Blanquet, 2004
- La Marque Jaune & le cinéma Churchill (Liège, Belgium), Rétrographie, 2002
- Galerie Arts Factory (Paris, France), Le Roi des Crabes, 2002
- Maison de la culture (Tournai, Belgium), Rétrographie, 2001
- Librairie-galerie Un regard moderne (Paris, France), 1996
- ??? (Montréal, Canada), A l'intérieur des têtes, 1995
- Librairie-galerie Un regard moderne (Paris, France), Exposition posthume,1993

=== Group shows ===
- United Dead Artists pop-up store (Paris, France), "Chapelle", 2015
- Médiathèque Hermeland (Saint-Herblain, France), "Exposer / s'exposer : 20 ans d'arts graphiques", 2014
- Maison des Arts Georges Pompidou, centre d'art contemporain, (Carjac, France), "Alternatives", 2013
- Gallery 7 (New York, USA), "Anxiety", 2013
- Zentralinstitut für Kunstgeschichte (Munich, Germany), "Graphzines 1975–2013: publications by French underground artists", 2013
- Arts factory X Galerie Lavigne (Paris, France), "United Dead artists: 400 dessins à vif", 2012
- Université de Caen (Caen, France), "Kiosque United Dead artists", 2012
- Halle Saint Pierre (Paris, France), "Hey! Modern art et pop culture", 2011
- Museum of Narrative Arts (San Diego, US), "Survey Select: A Narrative Art Exhibition", 2010
- Musée de l'Abbaye Sainte-Croix (Les Sables d'Olonne, France), "Alternatives grafikes", 2010
- Dirty Deal Gallery (Riga, Latvia), "Mental Discharge", 2010
- Musée d'Art Contemporain MAC Lyon (Lyon, France), "Quintet", large-scale installation, 2009
- Théâtre Forum Meyrin (Meyrin, Switzerland), "Même pas peur", 2009
- Toppan Museum, (Tokyo, Japan), "World Book Design 2007–2008", 2008
- Galerie Anatome (Paris, France), "Les Plus Beaux Livres Français 2007", 2008
- Bongoût (Berlin, Germany), "Mollusk Kollektiv", 2008
- Marianna Kistler Beach Museum of Art (Manhattan, Kansas, USA), Blab! Retrospective, 2008
- Musée des Arts Décoratifs (Paris, France), "Toy Comics", 2007
- Hayward Gallery (London, UK), "Cult Fiction", travelling group show, 2007
- Tri Postal (Lille, France), "Skate", 2006
- Centre culturel Una Volta (Bastia, France), "13èmes Rencontres de la BD et de l'illustration", 2005
- Museum of Art Lucerne (Lucerne, Switzerland), "Blab! Exhibition", 2005
- Track 16 gallery (Santa Monica, CA, USA), "The Blab! show", 2005
- Arts Factory (Paris, France), "Vertige Vision: 200 dessins non conformes", 2005
- Babel Festival (Athens, Greece), "Athens International Comics Festival", 2005
- Galerie Yaralt (Rouen, France), "Eyeslide", 2005
- Meeting space for visual culture (Leuven, Belgium), "In Between", 2005
- Foster Art (London, UK), "The postcard project", 2004
- Galerie Haus Schwarzenberg (Berlin, Germany), "Bilder & Bücher", 2003
- Gallery Copro/Nason (Culver City, California, USA), "The Haunted Doll House", 2003
- Gallery Extrapool (Nijmegen, the Netherlands), 2003

=== Events ===
- Comédie de Caen (Caen, France), "Festival des boréales", 2012
- Night Lights Singapore (Singapore), "Distorted forest", large scale night time installation, 2012
- Rock en Seine (Paris, France), "Rock Art", 2009
- 24ème salon du livre et de la presse jeunesse (Montreuil, France), "ClacClac", 2008
- Festival international BD-FIL (Lausanne, Switzerland), "Sur l'épiderme", 2006
- Quinzaine de la BD 2005 (Bruxelles, Belgium), 2005
- 10ème festival de bande dessinée de Haute Normandie (Darténal, France), 2005
- 19ème festival de la BD de Colomiers (Colomiers, France), "mi-steak / mi-raisin", 2005
- Festival international de BD de Sierre (Sierre, Switzerland), "cubix rooms", 2004
- Berliner Comicfestival (Berlin, Germany), "Kinderkids in Wonderland", 2003
- 4ème rencontre autour des illustrateurs et éditeurs bd indépendants (Livry-Gargan, France), 2002

=== Animation movies ===
- Cornée (2012)
- Mauvaise graine (2004, 4 min), pilote for a feature-long animation movie
- La Peau de chagrin (2003, 10 min)
- L'Épine de succession (2001)26
- Histoire muette (2000, 26x1 min)
- Mon placard (1999, 8 min)
- Vivement l'an 2000 (1998, 4x25 s)
- Le Mélange des couleurs (1997, 2 min)

=== Publishing ===
- Chacal Puant
- La Monstrueuse
- United Dead Artists
- United Dead Toys

=== Theatre and contemporary dance ===
- Ubu Roi, 2017
- Richard III - Loyaulté me lie, 2016
- Mon amoureux noueux pommier, 2012
- War Sweet War, 2012
- Comment ai-je pu tenir là dedans, 2010
- Sade Songs, 2006
- En sourdine, 2006

== Publications (selection) ==
=== Monographs ===
- Monographie lacrymale, l'An 02, 2005 (preface by Gaspar Noé)
- Rétrographie, Maison de la culture de Tournai + United Dead Artists, 2001

=== Exhibition catalogs ===
- Rendez vous Moi en Toi, 100 pages, United Dead Artists, 2013
- Le Boyau Noir, Wharf, Centre d'art contemporain de Basse-Normandie (France), 2012
- Quintet, Musée d'Art Contemporain with Editions Glénat (France), 2009
- Toy Comics, L'Association (France), 2007
- Cult Fiction: art and comics, by Paul Gravett and Emma Mahony, Cornerhouse Publications (UK), 2006

=== Art books ===
- Vide point . Rose trou, Re:Surgo (Germany), 2014
- Rendez vous Moi en Toi, United Dead Artists (France), 2013
- Miel de fond, Bongout (Germany), 2010
- Town of tiny loops, with Mami Chan, L'armada production (France), 2010
- La chair nue s'articule, Alain Beaulet éditeur (France), 2008
- Ratures N°1 & Ratures N°2, Alain Beaulet éditeur (France), 2006
- Le fond du jardin, B.ü.L.b comix (Switzerland), 2005
- Troubles sur l'oreiller, Alain Beaulet éditeur (France), 2004
- Sur l'épiderme, Alain Beaulet éditeur (France), 2003
- Le Fantôme des autres, Drozophile (Switzerland), 2000
- Mon méchant moi, Chacal Puant (France), 1996
- Badadaboum, Istvan Vamos Agudo Apdo (Spain), 1996
- À l'intérieur... des têtes, Mille Putois (Canada) 1995
- Canned monster, Chacal Puant (France), 1995
- Le petit livre, Chacal Puant (France), 1994
- Ça va mal, Chacal Puant (France), 1994
- Ultimatum gangster poche, Chacal Puant (France), 1994

=== Graphic novels ===
- A pior Noticia (La nouvelle aux pis), A Bolha Editora (Brazil), 2014
- De zwarte heer / druk 1 (Le Noir Seigneur), Luitingh Sijthoff (The Netherland), 2011
- Donjon Monster 6 - Der schwarze Fürst (Le Noir Seigneur), Reprodukt (Germany), 2008
- La mazmorra monstruos 4. El señor negro (Le Noir Seigneur), Norma Editorial S.a. (Spain), 2008
- La Vénéneuse à deux éperons, Cornélius (France), 2005
- 幸福の花束 (Bouquet Bonheur), Parol-Sha (Japan), 2005
- Chocottes au sous-sol, La joie de lire, 2005
- Donjon Monster Tome 4, Le Noir Seigneur, Delcourt, 2003
- Les Gens des Bois, United Dead Artists (France), 2003
- Bouquet Bonheur, 60 pages, Editions Cornélius, 2002
- Bourrelet Comics, Les Loups Sont Fâchés (France), 2002
- La nouvelle aux pis, Edition Cornélius, 2002, (ISBN 2-909990-61-3)
- Morphologie Variable, L'association, 2001
- La nouvelle aux pis, Cornélius, 2001
- Le Lombric, Cornélius, 1999
- Mi Yo Malo, (Mon Méchant Moi), Tabasco Carrasco, 1998
- Mon placard, Schokoriegel, 1997

=== Books for younger audience ===
- La Reine des Neiges by Hans Christian Andersen, illustrated by Stéphane Blanquet, Gallimard jeunesse, Giboulées (France), 2011
- 怪物ーーわたしたちのべつの顔？ by Pierre Péju, illustrated by Stéphane Blanquet, 岩崎書店 (Japan), 2011
- Les Fables de Jean de La Fontaine, illustrated by Stéphane Blanquet, Gallimard jeunesse, Giboulées (France), 2010
- Les Bêtes d'Ombre by Anne Sibran, illustrated by Stéphane Blanquet, Gallimard jeunesse, Giboulées (France), 2010
- Toys in the Basement, Stéphane Blanquet, Fantagraphics (USA), 2010
- La vieille Chéchette, by Louise Michel, illustrated by Stéphane Blanquet, Albin Michel Jeunesse (France), 2008
- Sapiencia y artimanas de Socrates, el filosofo de la calle by Jean-Jacques Barrère & Christian Roche, illustrated by Stéphane Blanquet, Ediciones Tecolote (Mexico), 2007
- Le monstrueux, by Pierre Péju, illustrated by Stéphane Blanquet, Gallimard jeunesse, Giboulées (France), 2007
- Sagesses et malices de Socrate, le philosophe de la rue, by Jean-Jacques Barrère & Christian Roche, illustrated by Stéphane Blanquet, Albin Michel (France), 2005
- Chocottes au sous-sol! by Blanquet, La Joie de lire (Switzerland), 2005
- Le roi des crabes, by Blanquet and Olive, Le Seuil (France), 2002

=== Collective books ===
- Catalogue WHARF (2000–2012), Edition Wharf, Centre d'art contemporain de Basse-Normandie (France), 2012
- Coffret Eprouvette, l'Association (France), 2012
- Black Eye: Graphic Transmissions to Cause Ocular Hypertension, Rotland Press (USA), 2011
- XX/MMX, l'association (France), 2010
- Vues sur la ville, par Alain Lachartre, Edition Michel Lagarde (France), 2010
- Tales of Woe, MTV Book (USA), 2010
- Illustration Now! 3, Taschen (Germany), 2009
- Hotwire Comics Vol. 3, edited by Glenn Head, Fantagraphics (USA), 2009
- Nous sommes Motörhead, Dargaud (France), 2009
- Beasts! Book 2, edited by Jacob Covey, Fantagraphics (USA), 2008
- Le muscle Carabine, United Dead Artists (France), 2007
- Cornélius ou l'art de la mouscaille et du pinaillage, Cornélius (France), 2007
- Mollusk #03, Bongoût (Germany), 2006
- Mattt Konture, Archives N°2, L'association (France), 2006
- Fabuleux Furieux! Hommage en Freak Style, Les Requins Marteaux (France), 2004
- Color Star, Editions Un sourire de toi et j'quitte ma mère (France), 2004
- Reiser Forever, Edition Denoël (France), 2003
- 5, Het Besloten Land, (Netherland), 2001
- Comix 2000, by Jean-Christophe Menu, L'Association (France), 1999

=== Periodicals ===
- "Popper Vol 3 & Vol 9" (Latvia), artworks, 2013
- "Pull de cheval N°1, N°2 & N°3" (France), 2011
- "Hi Fructose N°17" (USA), 2010
- "Illustration Japan N°182" (Japan), 2010
- "Encore N°2" (Japan), 2010
- "Kramer Ergot Vol 7" (USA), edited by Sammy Harkham, 2008
- "Psikopat N°200" (France), May 2008
- "Muscle Carabine" (France), 2008
- "L'Horreur est Humaine Vol 2" (France), 2008
- "L'Horreur est Humaine Vol 1" (France), 2008
- "George N°10" (Belgium), 2008
- "L'Eprouvette N°3" (France), artworks, 2007
- "Vertige N°1", 2002
- "L'Horreur est Humaine N°7", 2002
- "Lapin N°31" (France), 2002
- "Ax N°19" (Japan), 2001
- Blab #9, #10, #11, #13, #14, #15, published by Monte Beauchamp, Fantagraphics Books (USA), 1998

== Collections ==
His artwork is in private collections in the USA, France, Europe, Malaysia, Japan, the Philippines,… and in public collections, for example:

- Zentralinstitut für Kunstgeschichte, (Munich, Germany)
- Bibliothèque Nationale de France, (Paris, France)
- Centre de ressources et de documentation sur les fanzines et revues amateurs, (Poitiers, France)
