= List of British dark comedies =

British dark comedy refers to a British comedy containing gloomy or disturbing elements. Two of the most successful British dark comedies are The League of Gentlemen and One Foot in the Grave, coming in at number 41 and number 10 respectively in the BBC Britain's Best Sitcom poll.

== TV shows ==
=== 1990s ===
- Brass Eye
- If You See God, Tell Him
- One Foot in the Grave
- Murder Most Horrid

=== 2000s ===
- Fun at the Funeral Parlour
- Catterick
- Garth Marenghi's Darkplace
- Human Remains
- Ideal
- Jam
- The League of Gentlemen
- Monkey Dust
- Nighty Night
- Psychoville
- Snuff Box
- The Life and Times of Vivienne Vyle

=== 2010s ===
- A Touch of Cloth
- Getting On
- Black Mirror
- Hunderby
- Misfits
- Inside No. 9
- The End of the F***ing World

== Movies ==
- Monty Python's Life of Brian
- Monty Python's The Meaning of Life
- The Death of Stalin

== See also ==
- Black humour
- British comedy
