= Cruel jokes =

Series of sick humor jokes

Cruel jokes is a joke cycle dealing with cruelty and macabre topics. They belong to the category of sick humor. Typical examples:

– Mommy, why is daddy still sleeping?
– Shut up and keep digging.

– Mommy, why is daddy swimming so fast?
– Shut up and reload.

== History ==
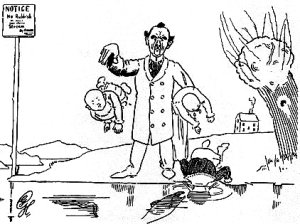
"Father heard his children scream / So he threw them in the stream" – illustration to the 1899 Ruthless Rhymes

In American culture, jokes of this kind were recorded as early as in the 1930s as the Little Audrey jokes, with a larger cycle reported during the 1950s, many with the "Shut up..." punch line. Sutton-Smith remarks that the macabre nature of these jokes may also be compared with even earlier 19th-century Little Willie rhymes: "Little Willie with his thirst for gore / Nailed his mommy's baby to the door". The origin of Little Willie poetry and other sick humour is attributed to the 1899 book Ruthless Rhymes for Heartless Homes by minor poet Harry Graham.

A significant part of them was focused on in-family antagonism, stressing lovelessness and violence. Joseph Boskin attributes them to increased anxiety within families due to severe societal changes: two working parents, frequent relocations, increase in marital separation and divorce.

In 1960, Brian Sutton-Smith classified 155 collected "cruel" jokes into categories of murder of friend or relative, mutilation, cannibalism, corpses, beasts, excrement, degenerate parents, indifference to young, afflictions/disease/mutilation, religion, and famous people. He noted that at this time there was no established name for these jokes and they were variously called Cruel Jokes, Bloody Marys, Hate Jokes, Ivy League Jokes, Sadist Jokes, Gruesomes, Grimsels, Sick Jokes, Freddie Jokes, Depression Jokes, Meanie Jokes, and Comedy of Horror. The collected jokes appear to have originated during the 1950s and come both from American and British sources.

Sutton-Smith notices the major novelty: all mishaps with Little Audrey (being cooked, crushed, broken, etc.) were due to accidents, while in cruel jokes the macabre acts are intentional.

Roger Abrahams pointed out the terse "vignette" form of the joke, akin to a caption to a cartoon, and noticed that some of them have already been known in a more narrative form. "Son, will you quit kicking your sister" – "Oh, that's all right. She's already dead". Compare with: "The boy was walking down the street kicking a baby. A policeman walked up to him and said. 'What are you doing here?' – 'I am kicking the baby down the street'. – 'You are what?' – 'Oh, that's all right, he's dead.'"

Abrahams noted that this kind of anti-taboo jokes is a society-level check against the excessive repressiveness of societal norms.

== See also ==
- Dead baby jokes
- Black comedy
