= Pierre Beuchot =

French filmmaker

- Born: June 30, 1938 (age 88); Les Pavillons-sous-Bois, Seine-Saint-Denis, France
- Occupation: Filmmaker

Pierre Beuchot (French: [pjɛʁ bøʃo]; born 1938) is a French filmmaker.

== Early life ==
Pierre Beuchot was born in 1938 in Les Pavillons-sous-Bois, near Paris, France.

== Career ==
He is a filmmaker.
