= Olivier Corpet =

French writer and author (1949–2020)

- Born: 4 September 1949; Paris, France
- Died: 6 October 2020 (aged 71); Paris, France
- Occupations: Writer; Author

Olivier Corpet (4 September 1949 – 6 October 2020) was a French author and writer. He was co-founder, then director of the Institute for Contemporary Publishing Archives for 24 years.

== Biography ==
Corpet was born in Paris on 4 September 1949. He was the grandson of the musical critic Robert Brussel, and the great-grandson of Lucien Corpet, founder of Corpet-Louvet. Olivier studied economics and sociology at the School for Advanced Studies in the Social Sciences, where he defended a thesis on social sciences, devoted to the scientific journal titled Arguments published by Les Éditions de Minuit from 1956 to 1962.

Corpet began working as an engineer for the French National Centre for Scientific Research. He then began his professional career as a writer in the early 1970s for Autogestion, which discussed historical and theoretical research on self-management. In 1980, he changed the name of the magazine, adding an "s" to the end to make it Autogestions. Corpet succeeded Yvon Bourdet as director of the journal until his retirement from Autogestions in 1986.

In 1985, Corpet created a research group on scientific journals at the Maison des Sciences de l'homme Paris-Nord. In 1986, he helped co-found Ent'revues, an association based on the research group. He also helped create the Revue des revues alongside Jean Gattégno.

Supported by Jack Lang, Christian Bourgois, Antoine Gallimard, and Claude Durand, Corpet founded the Institute for Contemporary Publishing Archives with Pascal Fouché and Jean-Pierre Dauphin in 1988. He served as Director until 2013, when he resigned for health-related reasons. He entrusted management of the Institute to Nathalie Léger, Albert Dichy, and André Derval.

Olivier Corpet died in Paris on 6 October 2020 at the age of 71.

== Publications ==
=== Novel ===
- Alain Robbe-Grillet le voyageur du nouveau roman : Chronologie illustrée, 1922-2002 (2002)

=== Scientific Editions ===
- Les revues d'avant-garde (1990)
- L'avenir dure longtemps; suivi de Les faits (1992)
- Stalag XA, 1940-1945 : carnets, correspondances, textes (1992)
- Écrits sur la psychanalyse : Freud et Lacan (1993)
- Éclats de mémoire (1994)
- e catalogue des revues culturelles (1995)
- Psychanalyse et sciences humaines : deux conférences (1963-1964) (1996)
- L'espace de la langue : Beyrouth-Paris : colloque (2000)
- Le voyageur : textes, causeries et entretiens : 1947-2001 (2004)
- Christian Dotremont : 1922-1979 (2005)
- L'avenir dure longtemps; suivi de Les faits (2007)
- Archives de la vie littéraire sous l'Occupation : à travers le désastre (2009)
- Lettres à Hélène [Texte imprimé] : 1947-1980 (2011)
- Des rêves d'angoisse sans fin: récits de rêves : 1941-1967; suivi de Un meurtre à deux : 1985 (2015)

=== Prefaces ===
- Le Pavillon des fantômes : souvenirs (2003)
- Mes scandales (2013)
- Bernard-Henri Lévy (2014)

== Distinctions ==
- Officer of the Ordre des Arts et des Lettres (2013)
- Knight of the Legion of Honour (2016)
