= Dark humor =

Comedic work based on taboo subject matter

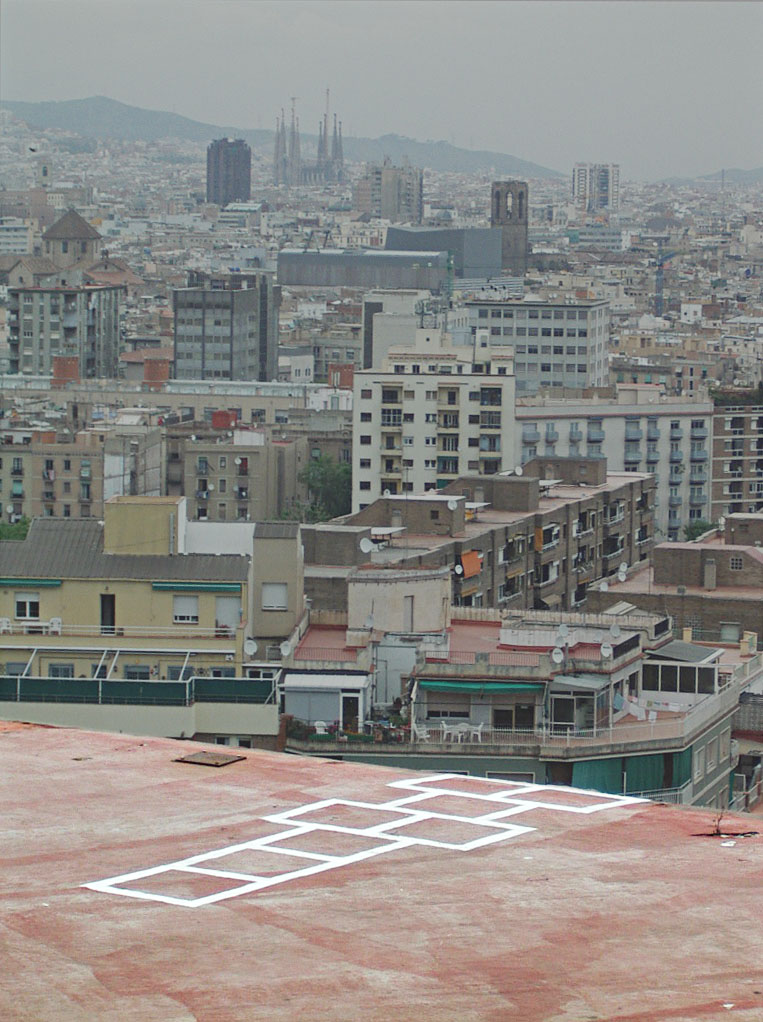
"Hopscotch to oblivion" in Barcelona, Spain, alluding to suicide

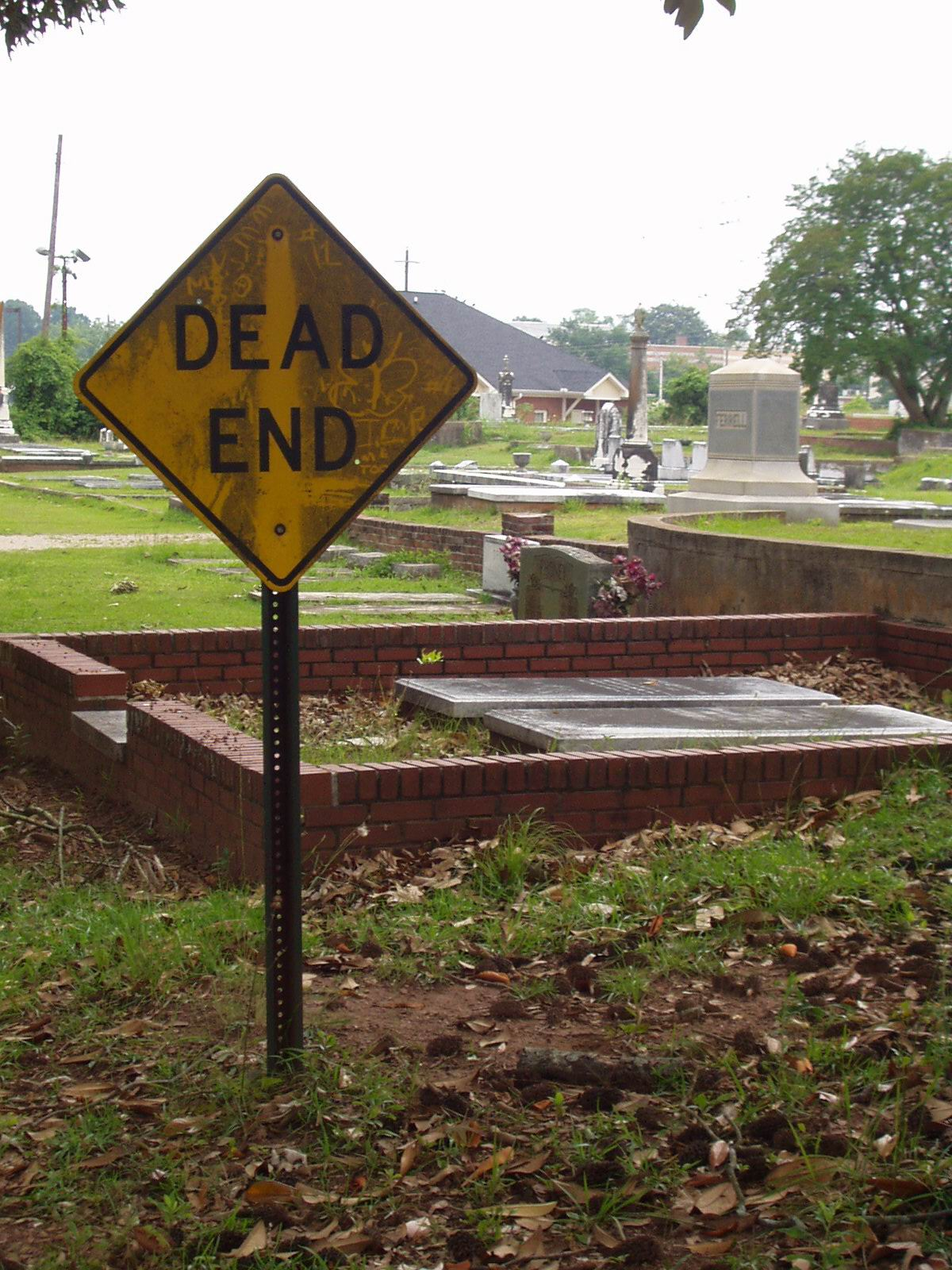
A cemetery with a "Dead End" sign, creating a play on words

Dark humor, also known as black comedy, black humor, bleak comedy, dark comedy, gallows humor or morbid humor is a style of comedy that makes light of subject matter that is generally considered taboo as a topic for humor or laughter, particularly subjects that are normally considered serious or painful to discuss. Thus dark humor aims to provoke discomfort, serious thought, and uncomfortable amusement for its audience.

Dark humor differs from blue comedy—which focuses more on topics such as nudity, sex, and body fluids—and from obscenity. Additionally, whereas the term dark humor is a relatively broad term covering humor relating to many serious subjects, gallows humor tends to be used more specifically in relation to death, or situations that are reminiscent of dying. Dark humor can occasionally be related to the grotesque genre. Literary critics have associated black comedy and black humor with authors as early as the ancient Greeks with Aristophanes.

== Etymology ==
The term black humor (from the French humour noir) was coined by the Surrealist theorist André Breton in 1935 while interpreting the writings of Jonathan Swift. Breton's preference was to identify some of Swift's writings as a subgenre of comedy and satire in which laughter arises from cynicism and skepticism, often relying on topics such as death.

Breton coined the term for his 1940 book Anthology of Black Humor (Anthologie de l'humour noir), in which he credited Jonathan Swift as the originator of black humor and gallows humor (particularly in his pieces Directions to Servants (1731), A Modest Proposal (1729), Meditation Upon a Broomstick (1710), and in a few aphorisms). In his book, Breton included excerpts from 45 other writers, including both examples in which the wit arises from a victim with which the audience empathizes, as is more typical in the tradition of gallows humor, and examples in which the comedy is used to mock the victim. In the last cases, the victim's suffering is trivialized, which leads to sympathizing with the victimizer, as analogously found in the social commentary and social criticism of the writings of, for instance, the Marquis de Sade.

== History ==
Christian martyr Saint Lawrence became the patron saint of comedians because he made a dark joke during his own execution. He was sentenced to death via being burned alive on a rotisserie, during which he is said to have quipped, "Turn me over. I'm done on this side." He is also the patron saint of chefs because of this.

=== Great Britain and the United States ===
Among the first American writers who employed black comedy in their works were Nathanael West and Vladimir Nabokov. The concept of black humor first came to nationwide attention after the publication of a 1965 mass-market paperback titled Black Humor, edited by Bruce Jay Friedman. The paperback was one of the first American anthologies devoted to the concept of black humor as a literary genre. With the paperback, Friedman labeled as "black humorists" a variety of authors, such as J. P. Donleavy, Edward Albee, Joseph Heller, Thomas Pynchon, John Barth, Vladimir Nabokov, Bruce Jay Friedman himself, and Louis-Ferdinand Céline.

Among the recent writers suggested as black humorists by journalists and literary critics are Roald Dahl, Kurt Vonnegut, Warren Zevon, Christopher Durang, Philip Roth, and Veikko Huovinen. Evelyn Waugh has been called "the first contemporary writer to produce the sustained black comic novel." The motive for applying the label black humorist to the writers cited above is that they have written novels, poems, stories, plays, and songs in which profound or horrific events were portrayed in a comic manner. Lenny Bruce, who since the late 1950s has been labeled as using "sick comedy" by mainstream journalists, has also been labeled with "black comedy".

== Nature and functions ==
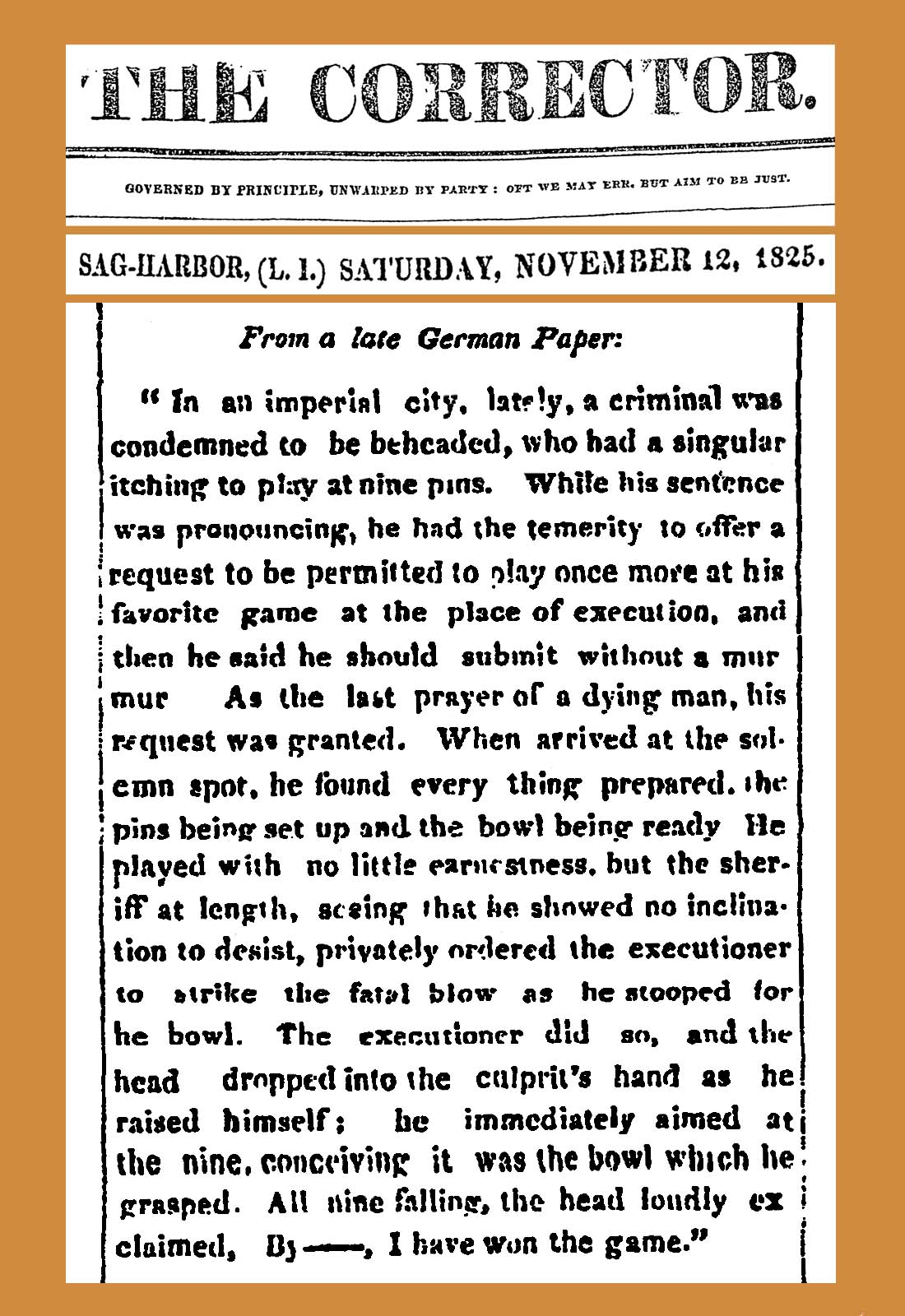
An 1825 New York newspaper used a gallows humor "story" of a criminal whose last wish before being beheaded was to go nine-pin bowling, using his own severed head on his final roll, and taking delight in having achieved a strike.

Sigmund Freud, in his 1927 essay Humor (Der Humor), although not mentioning 'black humor' specifically, cites a literal instance of gallows humor before writing: "The ego refuses to be distressed by the provocations of reality, to let itself be compelled to suffer. It insists that it cannot be affected by the traumas of the external world; it shows, in fact, that such traumas are no more than occasions for it to gain pleasure." Some other sociologists elaborated this concept further. Paul Lewis warns that this "relieving" aspect of gallows jokes depends on the context of the joke: whether the joke is being told by the threatened person themselves or by someone else.

Black comedy has the social effect of strengthening the morale of the oppressed and undermines the morale of the oppressors. According to Wylie Sypher, "to be able to laugh at evil and error means we have surmounted them."

Black comedy is a natural human instinct and examples of it can be found in stories from antiquity. Its use was widespread in Central Europe, from where it was imported to the United States. It is rendered with the German expression Galgenhumor (cynical last words before getting hanged). The concept of gallows humor is comparable to the French expression rire jaune (lit. yellow laughing), which also has a Germanic equivalent in the Belgian Dutch expression groen lachen (lit. green laughing).

Italian comedian Daniele Luttazzi discussed gallows humor focusing on the particular type of laughter that it arouses (risata verde or groen lachen), and said that grotesque satire, as opposed to ironic satire, is the one that most often arouses this kind of laughter. In the Weimar era Kabaretts, this genre was particularly common, and according to Luttazzi, Karl Valentin and Karl Kraus were the major masters of it.

Black comedy is common in professions and environments where workers routinely have to deal with dark subject matter. This includes police officers, firefighters, ambulance crews, military personnel, journalists, lawyers, and funeral directors, where it is an acknowledged coping mechanism. It has been encouraged within these professions to make note of the context in which these jokes are told, as outsiders may not react the way that those with mutual knowledge do.

A 2017 study published in the journal Cognitive Processing concludes that people who appreciate dark humor "may have higher IQs, show lower aggression, and resist negative feelings more effectively than people who don't."

== See also ==
- Blue comedy
- Comedy horror
- Cringe comedy
- Cruel jokes
- Dead baby jokes
- Doomer
- Holocaust humor
- List of British dark comedies
- Macabre
- Satire (film and television)
- Surreal humour
