= Anthology of Black Humor =

Short story collection by André Breton

- First edition
- Editor: André Breton
- Original title: Anthologie de l'humour noir
- Translator: Mark Polizzotti (1997)
- Language: French
- Genre: Anthology
- Published: 1940, 1947,1966 (Éditions du Sagittaire) January 1, 2001 (City Lights Publishers)
- Publication place: France
- Media type: Print (paperback)
- Pages: 356 pp (English edition)
- ISBN: 978-0-872-86321-7
- LC Class: AC

The Anthology of Black Humor (French: Anthologie de l'humour noir) is an anthology of 45 writers edited by André Breton. It was first published in 1940 in Paris by Éditions du Sagittaire and its distribution was immediately banned by the Vichy government. It was reprinted in 1947 after Breton's return from exile, with a few additions. In 1966, Breton, "having resisted the temptation to add more names", published the book again and called this edition "the definitive".

The anthology not only introduced some until then almost unknown or forgotten writers but also coined the term "black humor" (as Breton said, until then the term had meant nothing, unless someone imagined jokes about black people). The term became globally used since then. The choice of authors was done entirely by Breton and according to his taste which he explains in the Foreword (called The Lightning Rod, a term suggested by Lichtenberg), a work of great depth (Breton was the main theoretician of the Surrealist movement) that starts with contemplating Rimbaud´s words "Emanations, explosions." from Rimbaud's last poem The barrack-room of night : Dream. The authors, each introduced by a preface by Breton and represented by a few pages from their writings, are sorted chronologically. The book is still in print. It was translated into several languages; into English by Mark Polizzotti in 1997.

== Contents of the 1966 "definitive" edition ==
The anthology contains the following excerpts, each introduced by a commentary by Breton:

- Jonathan Swift: Directions to Servants, A Modest Proposal, Meditation Upon a Broomstick; a few aphorisms;
- D.-A.-F.de Sade: Juliette
- Georg Christoph Lichtenberg: selected aphorisms.
- Charles Fourier: L'éléphant, le chien...
- Thomas De Quincey: On Murder Considered as one of the Fine Arts
- Pierre François Lacenaire
- Petrus Borel: Marchand et voleur est synonyme
- Christian Dietrich Grabbe
- Edgar Allan Poe: The Angel of the Odd
- Xavier Forneret
- Charles Baudelaire
- Lewis Carroll: Lobster Quadrille
- Villiers de l'Isle-Adam: Le Tueur de cygnes (from Tribulat Bonhomet)
- Charles Cros
- Friedrich Nietzsche: Letter to Jacob Burckhardt (also published in The Portable Nietzsche)
- Isidore Ducasse (Comte de Lautréamont): excerpts from Maldor and Letters (Also published in Maldor and the Complete Works of the Comte de Lautreamont)
- Joris-Karl Huysmans
- Tristan Corbière: The Litany of Sleep (also published in the Centenary Corbiere)
- Germain Nouveau
- Arthur Rimbaud: excerpt from A Heart under a Cassok (also published in Completed Works, Selected Letters)
- Alphonse Allais
- Jean-Pierre Brisset
- O. Henry
- André Gide: Prometheus' Lecture (also published in Marshlands and Prometheus Misbound)
- John Millington Synge
- Alfred Jarry: The Debraining Song; and excerpts from Ubu Enchained, Act I, Scene II Le Champ de Mars (also published in The Ubu Plays)
- Raymond Roussel: excerpt from Impressions of Africa
- Francis Picabia
- Guillaume Apollinaire: Dramaturgy and Meetings (from The Poet Assassinated and Other Stories)
- Pablo Picasso
- Arthur Cravan
- Franz Kafka: excerpt from The Metamorphosis
- Jakob van Hoddis
- Marcel Duchamp: aphorisms (also found in The Writings of Marchel Duchamp
- Hans Arp: Bestiary with no First Name
- Alberto Savinio: Introduction to a Life of Mercury (from Le lives of the Gods)
- Jacques Vaché
- Benjamin Péret: Death to the Pigs and other writings
- Jacques Rigaut
- Jacques Prévert
- Salvador Dalí
- Jean Ferry
- Leonora Carrington: The Debutante
- Gisèle Prassinos
- Jean-Pierre Duprey

Others works excerpted include: Louis Aragon's 1928 Treatise on Style. Freud's 1928 Humor from International Journal of Psychoanalysis 9 1-6 (republished in Collected papers of Sigmund Freud vol.5).
