= Sick comedy =

Form of comedy characterized by cynicism, social criticism, and political satire

Sick comedy was a term originally used by mainstream news weeklies Time and Life to distinguish a style of comedy/satire that was becoming popular in the United States in the late 1950s. Mainstream comic taste in the United States had favored more innocuous forms, such as the topical but (for the time) inoffensive one-liners in Bob Hope's routines. In contrast, the new comedy favored observational monologues, often with elements of cynicism, social criticism and political satire.

The kind of sickness I wish Time had written about, is that school teachers in Oklahoma get a top annual salary of $4000, while Sammy Davis Jr. gets $10,000 for a week in Vegas.

— Lenny Bruce, "The Tribunal". I am not a nut, elect me! (LP). Fantasy. 7007

As a guest at the first airing of the Playboy's Penthouse show in 1959, Lenny Bruce objected to a Time article indiscriminately grouping seven new comedians, labeling them as "sick comics". (These were Lenny Bruce, political satirist Mort Sahl, Shelley Berman, Jonathan Winters, Mike Nichols and Elaine May, and Tom Lehrer.)

Stand-up comedian Daniele Luttazzi says: "the term sick comedy then ended up being used to encompass a bit of everything: the humor of the Mad magazine as Jules Feiffer, the cartoons by Charles Addams as the monologues by Mike Nichols and Elaine May, the traditional comedy by Shelley Berman and the hipster comedy of Dick Gregory." The first published (1958) collection of Feiffer cartoons was entitled 'Sick, Sick, Sick..'

== See also ==
- Beat Generation
- Black comedy
