= Directions to Servants =

1745 satirical essay by Jonathan Swift

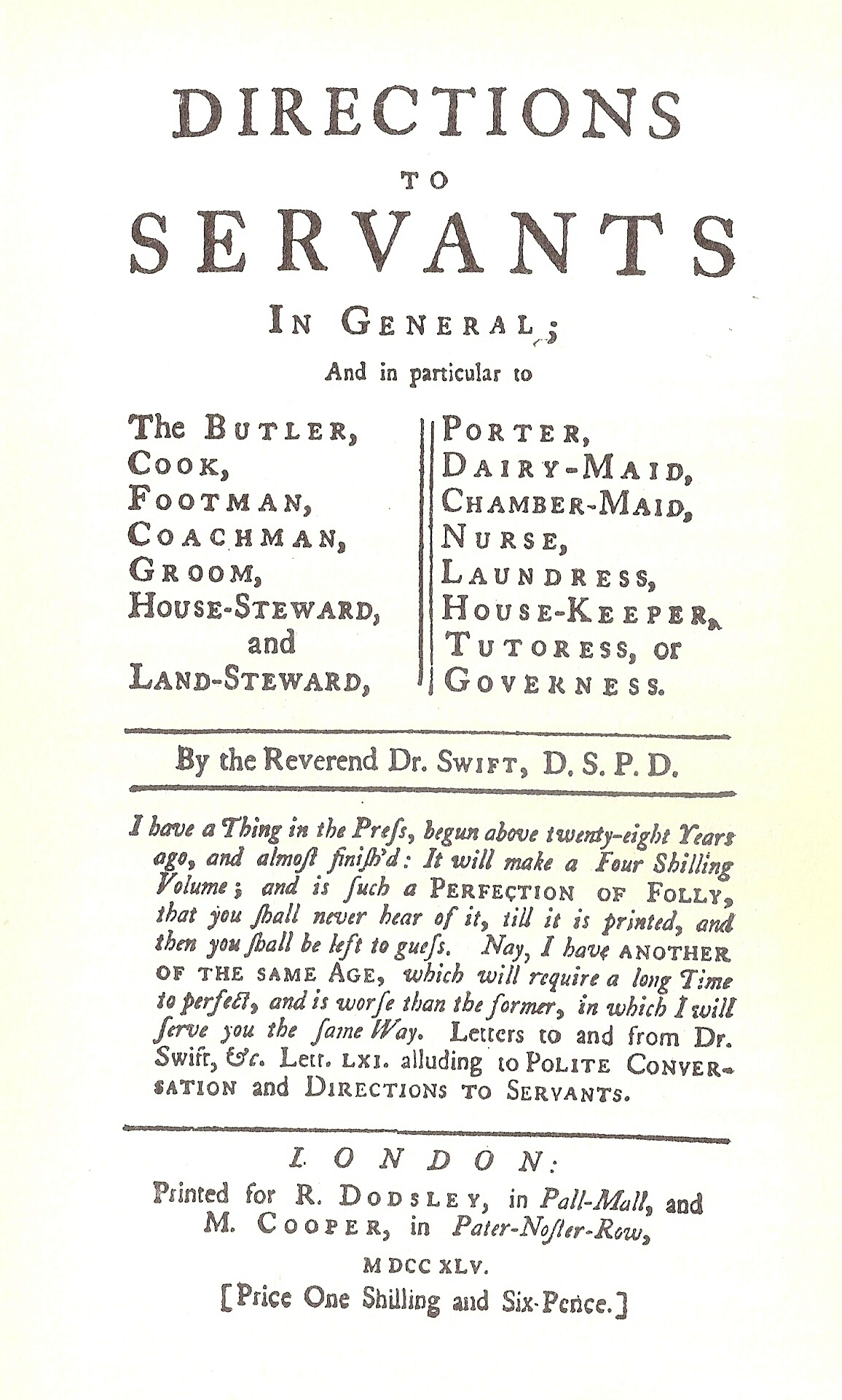
- Author: Jonathan Swift
- Original title: Directions to Servants in General; and in particular to [...]
- Language: English
- Genre: Essay; satire
- Published: 1745 (London)
- Publisher: R. Dodsley & M. Cooper
- Media type: Print, pamphlet
- Pages: 92
- Text: Directions to Servants at Wikisource

Directions to Servants is a satirical and humorous essay by Jonathan Swift. Swift is known to have been working on it in 1731, though it was not published until after his death in 1745. The first few chapters are much more developed than the later ones, and it appears that the work was unfinished and uncorrected at Swift's death.

After the introductory "Rules that Concern All Servants in General", the work is in 16 chapters:

- "Directions to the Butler"
- "Directions to the Cook"
- "Directions to the Footman"
- "Directions to the Coachman"
- "Directions to the Groom"
- "Directions to the House Steward and Land Steward"
- "Directions to the Porter"
- "Directions to the Chambermaid"
- "Directions to the Waitingmaid"
- "Directions to the Housemaid"
- "Directions to the Dairymaid"
- "Directions to the Children's Maid"
- "Directions to the Nurse"
- "Directions to the Laundress"
- "Directions to the Housekeeper"
- "Directions to the Tutoress, or Governess"

== Critical review ==
A 2015 review of Les Editions de Londres suggests that the light-hearted Directions to Servants is more of a Horatian than Juvenalian satire. Swift goes beyond simple parody or satire: by providing the servants with advice that verges on the absurd he deconstructs and amusingly reveals the absurdities of the Eighteenth-century English social system. But Swift is not concerned with the reform of society, and he does not have Beaumarchais’s pre-revolutionary stress on the injustice of an aristocratic system. Rather, his intent is to mock and denounce the travails of human nature as did Ben Jonson over a century earlier.

Although the essay is generally little-known in Britain, in France it is (after Gulliver’s Travels) one of his most famous works.
