= Jean Lambert-wild =

French theatre-maker

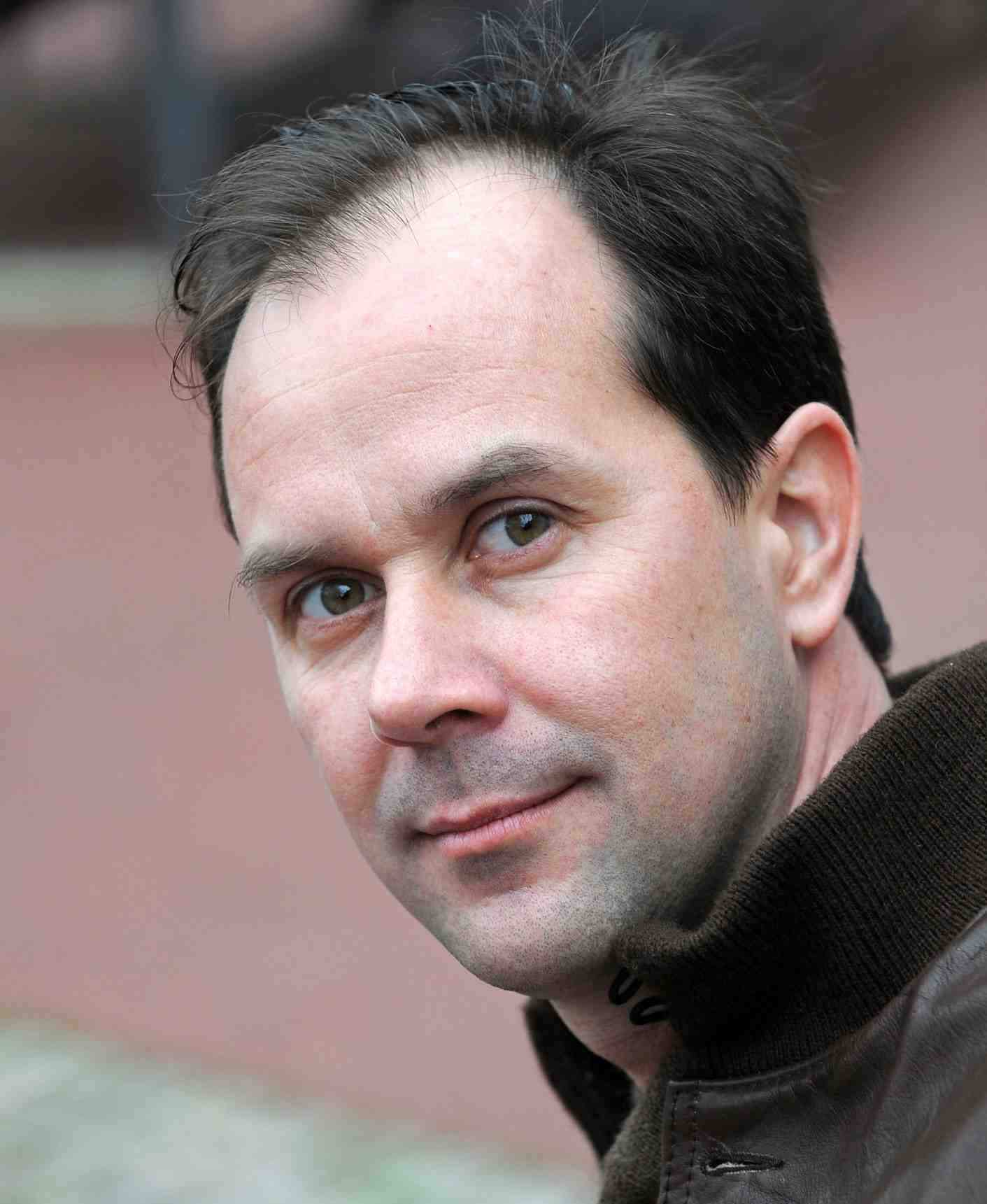
- Born: 1972 (age 53–54); Réunion
- Occupations: Theatre-maker, playwright, White Clown, scenographer
- Writing career
- Notable awards: 2014: Appointed Knight of the Ordre des Arts et des Lettres by the French Ministry of Culture and Communication

Jean Lambert-wild is a white clown and theatre-maker born in 1972 in Réunion. Since January 2021, he is the artistic director of the Coopérative 326.

== Biography ==
=== Early life ===
In 1979, his father, who was a livestock farmer, created the farming cooperative Sica Révia. In 2012, the cooperative was composed of 323 livestock farmers. As a child, Jean Lambert-wild experienced the creation of this cooperative as an initiatory event, which mythology continues to influence several of his projects. He moved Lyon in 1990 and started a BA in Philosophy at Lyon III University. It is there that André Arcellaschi, his Latin lecturer, incited him to direct plays by Plautus, Seneca the Younger and Gombrowicz. He considered joining the Merchant Navy, but shortly before saw a production of Chekhov's Three Sisters by German director Matthias Langhoff. This production had a strong impact on Lambert-wild, who realised that theatre was the medium that would give him the freedom he had been looking for.

=== Positions in French public institutions ===
In 2007, he was appointed director of Comédie de Caen – Centre Dramatique National de Normandie by the French Ministry of Culture, a role he retained until 31 December 2014.

The Comédie de Caen's mission involves enabling the creation and production of new work, and several of the shows it produces go on to tour nationally and internationally. As part of its mission, the institution also supports independent French and foreign theatre companies. The location of the Comédie de Caen, in the Normandy region, allowed Lambert-wild to further his efforts in developing non-Parisian audiences, in an attempt to make culture more accessible. In 2015, he was appointed by the Ministry of Culture to the direction of the Théâtre de l'Union, National Dramatic Center of Limousin, and of L'Académie - Higher Professional Theater School of Limousin, a position he held until December 31, 2020.

In 2020, following a social conflict with the employees of the Théâtre de l'Union, Despite numerous letters of support he resigned from the Théâtre de l'Union.

== As a director and scenographer ==
=== Ecmnesia ===
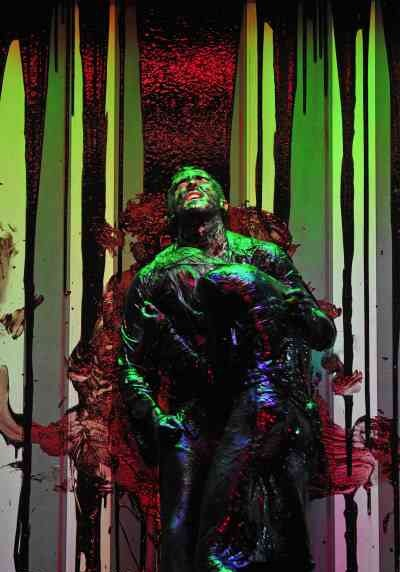
2012 - War sweet war

- 1990 : Grande lessive de printemps - Première Confession de l'Hypogée (Great Spring Clean – First Confession of the Hypogeum), a show by Jean Lambert-wild, Espace 44 in Lyon.
- 1992 : La Naissance de la paix (The Birth of Peace) by René Descartes, a show by Jean Lambert-wild and Groupe 3, Lyon 3 University.
- 1992 : Yvonne, princesse de Bourgogne (Ivonia, Princess of Burgundia) by Witold Gombrowicz, a show by Jean Lambert-wild and Groupe 3 Lyon 3 University.
- 1993 : Les Bacchides (Bacchides) by Plautus, a show by Jean Lambert-wild and Groupe 3, Lyon 3 University.
- 1994 : Les Troyennes (Trojan Women) by Seneca the Young, a show by Jean Lambert-wild and Groupe 3, Lyon 3 University.
- 1997 : Aquarium (Fish Tank), based on Olly's Prison (Maison d'arrêt) by Edward Bond, a show by Jean Lambert-wild, Café de l'Harmonie, Lyon.
- 1997 : V versus w, a show by Jean Lambert-wild, Café de l'Harmonie, Lyon.
- 1998 : Paradis (Paradise), a show by Jean Lambert-wild, Café de l'Harmonie, Lyon.
- 1999 : Splendeur et lassitude du Capitaine Marion Déperrier, Épopée en deux Époques et une Rupture (Splendor and Lassitude of Captain Marion Deperrier, Epic in two periods and a break), written by Jean Lambert-wild, Le Granit - Scène Nationale de Belfort.
- 2001 : Orgia by Pier Paolo Pasolini, a show by Jean Lambert-wild and Jean-Luc Therminarias, Théâtre National de la Colline, Paris.
- 2001 : Le Terrier (Der Bau), by Franz Kafka, a show by Jean Lambert-wild, Le Granit, scène Nationale de Belfort.
- 2002 : Spaghetti's Club, a show by Jean Lambert-wild and Jean-Luc Therminarias, created at La Filature, Scène Nationale de Mulhouse. Performed at MC93 in Bobigny, following work in progress showings in Bulgaria and Berlin.
- 2003 : Crise de nerfs - Parlez-moi d'amour, Deuxième Confession de l'Hypogée (Fits of Hysterics – Tell Me About Love, Second Confession of the Hypogeum), a show by Jean Lambert-wild and Jean-Luc Therminarias, Avignon Festival, 2003.
- 2005 : Mue, Un discours de Sereburã, accompagné d'un rêve de Waëhipo Junior et des mythes de la communauté Xavante d'Etênhiritipa, Première Mélopée de l'Hypogée, (Sloughing, A Speech by Sereburã with a dream by Waëhipo Junior and the myths of the Xavante community from Etênhiritipa, First Threnody of the Hypogeum), a show by Jean Lambert-wild and Jean-Luc Therminarias, created at the Castle of Saumane, as part of the Avignon Festival 2005.
- 2005 : Nous verrons bien (We'll See), a show by Jean Lambert-wild, Contre-Courant Festival, Avignon.
- 2006 : Sade Songs, A tale by Jean-Rémy Guédon, Stéphane Blanquet and Jean Lambert-wild, Allan, Scène Nationale de Montbéliard.
- 2007 : A corps perdu (Heart and Soul), and Arrêt sur Image (Freeze Frame), two shows by Jean Lambert-wild, Petit-Colombier, Comédie Française, followed by a tour in West Africa.
- 2008 : Le Malheur de Job (Job's Misfortune), a show by Jean Lambert-wild, Jean-Luc Therminarias, Dgiz, Jérôme Thomas and Martin Schwietzkze, Comédie de Caen - Centre Dramatique National de Normandie.
- 2009 : Ro-Oua ou le peuple des rois (Ro-oua, or The People of the Kings), a show by Jean Lambert-wild, Contre-Courant Festival, Avignon.
- 2009 : Le Recours aux forêts (The Retreat to the Forests), a show by Jean Lambert-wild, Jean-Luc Therminarias, Michel Onfray, Carolyn Carlson and François Royet, Comédie de Caen - Centre Dramatique National de Normandie as part of Les Boréales Festival, * 2009.
- 2010 : Comment ai-je pu tenir là-dedans ? (How Was I Ever Able To Live In there?), based on La Chèvre de Monsieur Seguin (The Goat of Monsieur Seguin) by Alphonse Daudet, a tale by Stéphane Blanquet and Jean Lambert-wild, Comédie de Caen - Centre Dramatique National de Normandie. Nominated for the Molière Awards 2010, in the category "Jeune Public" (Family Entertainment).
- 2010 : La Mort d'Adam - Deuxième Mélopée de l'Hypogée, (The Death of Adam – Second Threnody of the Hypogeum), a show by Jean Lambert-wild, Jean-Luc Therminarias, François Royet and Thierry Collet, Avignon Festival, 2010.
- 2011 : L'Ombelle du Trépassé (The Deceased's Umbel), a show by Jean Lambert-wild and Yann-Fañch Kemener, Maison de la Poésie, Paris.
- 2011 : Nazarov le Trimardeur - Le miel, (Nazarov le Trimardeur – Honey) a show by Jean Lambert-wild and Stéphane Pelliccia, Comédie de Caen - Centre Dramatique National de Normandie.
- 2012 : War Sweet War, a show by Jean Lambert-wild, Jean-Luc Therminarias, Stéphane Blanquet and Juha Marsalo, Comédie de Caen - Centre Dramatique National de Normandie.
- 2012 : La Sagesse des abeilles, Première leçon de Démocrite, (The Wisdom of Bees, The First Lesson of Democritus ), a show by Jean Lambert-wild, Jean-Luc Therminarias, Michel Onfray, Lorenzo Malaguerra and François Royet, Comédie de Caen - Centre Dramatique National de Normandie.
- 2012 : Mon amoureux noueux pommier, (My Lover Gnarled Apple Tree), a tale by Jean Lambert-wild and Stéphane Blanquet, Théâtre national de Chaillot.
- 2013 : L'armoire du Diable (The Devil's Wardrobe), a show by Jean Lambert-wild, created with the permanent company of the National Theatre of Hungary in Budapest (Hungary).
- 2013 : Nazarov le trimardeur - Mon œuf, (Nazarov le Trimardeur – My Egg) a show by Jean Lambert-wild and Stéphane Pelliccia, Comédie de Caen - Centre Dramatique National de Normandie.
- 2014 : En attendant Godot, (Waiting for Godot) by Samuel Beckett, directed by Jean Lambert-wild, Marcel Bozonnet and Lorenzo Malaguerra, Comédie de Caen.
- 2014 : Splendeur et Lassitude du Capitaine Iwatani Izumi, (Splendor and Lassitude of Captain Iwatani Izumi), a show by Jean Lambert-wild, Keita Mishima and Akihito Hirano, Shizuoka Performing Arts Center, Shizuoka (Japan).
- 2015 : Richard III - Loyaulté me Lie, based on Richard III by William Shakespeare, a show by Jean Lambert-wild, Lorenzo Malaguerra, Stéphane Blanquet, Élodie Bordas and Jean-Luc Therminarias, co-production Autumn 2015, in France / Switzerland / Belgium / USA / Quebec .
- 2016 : Roberto Zucco, de Bernard-Marie Koltès, a show by Jean Lambert-wild and Lorenzo Malaguerra, Myeongdong Theater, Séoul (Korea), September 2016, Théâtre de l'Union - Centre Dramatique du Limousin
- 2018 : Yotaro au pays des Yôkais, a show by Jean Lambert-wild & Lorenzo Malaguerra, Shizuoka Performing Arts Center à Shizuoka (Japon).
- 2019 : Dom juan ou le Festin de Pierre by Molière, a show by Jean Lambert-wild & Lorenzo Malaguerra, Théâtre de l'Union - Centre Dramatique du Limousin
- 2021 : La Chanson de Roland, a show by Jean Lambert-wild, Lorenzo Malaguerra et Marc Goldberg, Festival Poésie en arrosoir - La Chaux de Fonds
- 2022 : UBU Cabaret, a show by Jean Lambert-wild & associés, Le Granit - Scène nationale de Belfort
- 2022 : L'Avare by Molière, a show by Jean Lambert-wild & associés, Shizuoka Performing Arts Center à Shizuoka (Japan)

=== Calentures ===
The calentures are the sometimes burlesque, sometimes tragic poetic fury that his clown in striped pyjamas goes through.

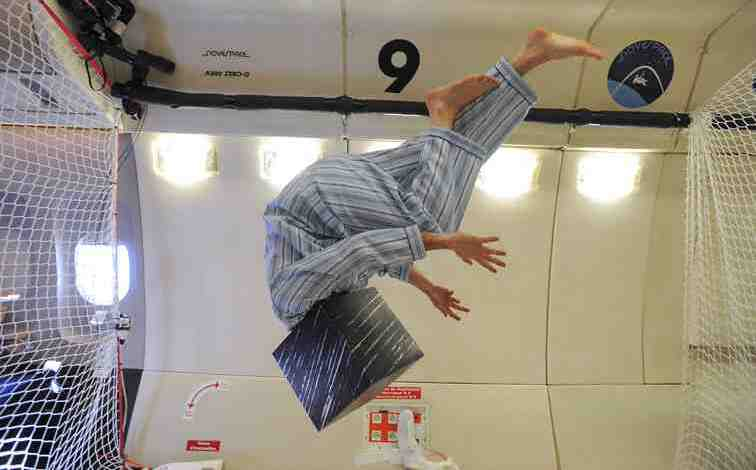
2013 - Space out Space

- 1998 : In Memoriam in spem, Calenture N°18 de l'Hypogée, created at la Chartreuse de Villeneuve-les-Avignon.
- 2000 : Aphtes, Calenture N°4 de l'Hypogée, created at l'Espace Gantner de Bourognes (Territoire de Belfort).
- 2002 : Ægri Somnia, Calenture N°2 of the Hypogeum, created for the Georges Rigal public swimming-pool, Paris. Collaboration with Théâtre National de la Colline, 2002.
- 2002 : Le Mur, Calenture N°27 de l'Hypogée, created at l'IRCAM - Paris.
- 2002 : Dédicace, Calenture N°29 de l'Hypogée, created at la Chartreuse, Festival d'Avignon.
- 2003 : Migraine, Calenture N°92 de l'Hypogée, created at le Granit-Scène Nationale de Belfort.
- 2003 : Tête à tête, Calenture N°88 de l'Hypogée, created at le Granit-Scène Nationale de Belfort, en collaboration avec l'UTBM.
- 2003 : Sourions au vent, Calenture N°36 de l'Hypogée, récitation à Etênhiritipa
- 2004 : Mon corps à la patrie, tes cendres au Panthéon, Calenture N°3 de l'Hypogée, created at Festival d'Avignon.
- 2004 : Éjaculation, Calenture N°54 de l'Hypogée, created at le Granit-Scène Nationale de Belfort.
- 2005 : My story is not a loft, Calenture N°17 de l'Hypogée, created at Festival d'Avignon.
- 2006 : Chantons sous la mort, Calenture N°325 de l'Hypogée, created at Festival des Escales Improbables à Montréal.
- 2006 : Remember and don't forget to play, Calenture N°145 de l'Hypogée created at Festival des Escales Improbables à Montréal.
- 2006 : Noyade, Calenture N°201 de l'Hypogée, created at Festival des Escales Improbables à Montréal.
- 2006 : Mon Savoureux, Calenture N°20 de l'Hypogée, created at le Granit, Scène Nationale de Belfort.
- 2006 : Faites-le taire! Calenture N°41 de l'Hypogée, created at Festival des Escales Improbables à Montréal.
- 2009 : Comme disait mon père, Calenture N°65 de l'Hypogée, édited by les Solitaires Intempestifs
- 2009 : Ma mère ne disait rien, Calenture N°66 de l'Hypogée, édited by les Solitaires Intempestifs
- 2010 : In Blood we trust, Calenture N°97 de l'Hypogée, created at Festival d'Avignon
- 2012 : Le labyrinthe du Cicérone, Calenture N°59 de l'Hypogée created at l'Hôtel de Soubise à Paris avec la plasticienne Milène Guermont
- 2012 : Petites peaux de confiture, Calenture N°47 de l'Hypogée created at l'Usine C à Montréal.
- 2012 : L'arbre à pyjamas, Calenture N°76 de l'Hypogée, created at Domaine d'Ô à Montpellier.2012 : Climat Calenture no 26 de l'Hypogée, création au Domaine d'O à Montpellier.
- 2012 : Le temps perdu, Calenture N°256 de l'Hypogée, created at la Comédie de Caen.
- 2013 : Space out space, vol en apesanteur, Calenture N°113 de l'Hypogée, created at le CNES à l'aéroport de Bordeaux-Mérignac.
- 2014 : Déclaration de Guerre, Calenture N°14 de l'Hypogée, created at L'Open Studio – Atelier de Paris CDNC, Paris.
- 2015 : J'ai oublié le code, Calenture N°99 de l'Hypogée, created at Lasalle College of the arts, Singapour.
- 2016 : Le clown des Marais, Calenture N°225 de l'Hypogée, created at Voilah ! Festival à Singapour.
- 2017 : Le clown du ruisseau, Calenture N°226 de l'Hypogée, created at Lycée français de Singapour.
- 2017 : Le clown du rocher, Calenture N°227 de l'Hypogée, created at festival La route du Sirque à Nexon.
- 2017 : Car cœur sur la bouche, Calenture N°69 de l'Hypogée, created at Lasalle College of the arts, Singapour
- 2017 : Spectres de Printemps, Calenture N°111 de l'Hypogée, created at Lycée français de Singapour58
- 2017 : Pour la Saint-Valentin, Calenture N°56 de l'Hypogée, created at Théâtre de l'Union – Centre Dramatique du Limousin.
- 2017 : Car Je de Je, Calenture N°11 de l'Hypogée, created at Lycée Français de Singapour, Singapour.
- 2018 : Coloris vitalis, Calenture N°1 de l'Hypogée, created at Théâtre de l'Union - Centre Dramatique National du Limousin, en partenariat avec le festival trente trente.
- 2018 : Vagabondages, Calenture N°78 de l'Hypogée, created at Voilah ! Festival à Singapour.
- 2018 : Un clown à la mer, Calenture N°55 de l'Hypogée created at Théâtre de l'Union - Centre Dramatique National du Limousin
- 2019 : L'impossible retour, Calenture N°324 de l'Hypogée, recitation in the forest de Lann er Heric.
- 2021 : Soudain le clown, Calenture N°100 de l'Hypogée, created at scènes du Golfe, Théâtres Vannes/Arradon.
- 2022 : Ah, les rats !, Calenture N°150 de l'Hypogée, created at à Saint-Dié des Vosges.
- 2022 : Chamboule tout ! Calenture N°79 de l'Hypogée, created at Manège, scène nationale de Maubeuge.
- 2023 : Le Valet des étoiles, Calenture N°125 de l'Hypogée, created at L'espace voltaire dans le cadre de l'exposition Super Terram

== As a scenographer ==
Jean Lambert-wild did the scenography for all his works for the stage, both the Ecmnésie and the Calentures, but he also worked as a scenographer on the following projects :

- 1997 : Vater Land, Vater Land, by Jean-Paul Wenzel, a show by Philippe Goyard, Le Granit, Scène Nationale de Belfort.
- 1998 : Combat de Nègres et de Chiens (Black Battles With Dogs), by Bernard-Marie Koltès, a show by Philippe Goyard, Le Granit, Scène Nationale de Belfort.
- 2014 : Babel, After the war by Xavier Dayer and Alberto Manguel, a show by Lorenzo Malaguerra, Théâtre de Vevey.

== The Gramblanc Clown ==
Jean Lambert-wild has lived with his white clown for over twenty years. This clown named Gramblanc nourishes his work as an interpreter in most of his shows. He first appeared in extreme game situations, called Calentures. Jean Lambert-wild designs this clown as an illustrator would. Gramblanc is often decked out in striped, white and blue pajamas. This strange character is a modern white clown, a figure renewed by the poetry he exudes and the energy he deploys. Jean Lambert-wild is the actor of all his Calentures which are, for the most part, written by Catherine Lefeuvre

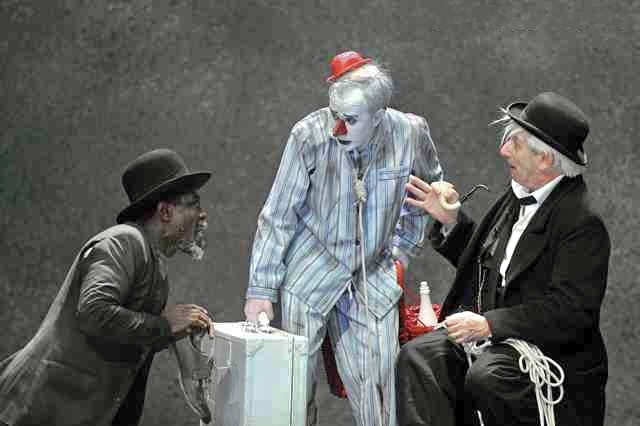
2014 - Waiting for Godot

Since 1997, he has performed in each of the Calentures (see list of the Calentures), but he also play as an actor on the followings projects :

- 1992 : In Yvonne, princesse de Bourgogne (Ivona, Princess of Burgundia), by Witold Gombrowicz, which he also directed, Groupe 3, Theatre Society of Lyon III University.
- 1993 : In Les Troyennes (Trojan Women) by Seneca the Young, which he also directed, Groupe 3, Theatre Society of Lyon III University.
- 1996 : In L'île du salut (The Salvation Island), based on La colonie pénitentiaire (In The Penal Colony) by Franz Kafka, directed by Matthias Langhoff, Théâtre de la Ville, Paris.
- 1997 : In V versus W, l'Impossible retour (The Impossible Return) et Migraine (Migraine), based on his own writings. Created with his first theatre company, L'écharpe rouge, based in Lyon.
- 2005 : In Mue, a show by Jean Lambert-wild and Jean-Luc Therminarias. Created at the Avignon Festival.
- 2010 : In La Mort d'Adam (The Death of Adam) written and directed by Jean Lambert-wild, premiere at the Avignon Festival.
- 2013 : He is the voice of Georges Chapman, in Clinique d'un roi, directed by Antoine Pickels.
- 2014 : He plays the role of Lucky in En attendant Godot (Waiting for Godot) by Samuel Beckett, a show by Jean Lambert-wild, Marcel Bozonnet and Lorenzo Malaguerra. Created at National Dramatic Center of Normandy
- 2016 : He plays Richard III in his adaptation of Shakespeare's eponymous play, Richard III - Loyaulté Me Lie, based on Richard III by William Shakespeare. Created at Theatre de l'Union - National Dramatic Center of Limousin
- 2018 : He plays the role of "Death" in Frida, Jambe de bois, premiere at Crochetan's Theater, by Ovale's Company.
- 2019 : He plays the role of Dom Juan in Dom juan ou le Festin de Pierre. National Dramatic Center of Limousin
- 2019 : He plays the role of Zizi Souflette in Les Cocottes en Sucettes, directed by Lorenzo Malaguerra, premiere at Crochetan's Theater, by Ovale's Company.

== Published work ==
- 1998 : Splendeur et lassitude du Capitaine Marion Déperrier, published by Éditions Les Solitaires Intempestifs (ISBN 978-2-912464-39-2)
- 2003 : Crise de nerfs - Parlez-moi d'amour suivi de Ægri Somnia, published by Éditions Les Solitaires Intempestifs (ISBN 978-2-84681-054-8)
- 2005 : Mue - Première Mélopée - Un discours de Sereburã accompagné d'un rêve de Waëhipo Junior et des mythes de la Communauté Xavante d'Etênhiritipa, published by Éditions Les Solitaires Intempestifs (ISBN 978-2-84681-147-7)
- 2005 : Se Tenir Debout, Entretiens avec Mari-Mai Corbel, published by Éditions Les Solitaires Intempestifs (ISBN 978-2-84681-148-4)
- 2009 : Spectres de Printemps, Collection Nervium, (Comédie de Caen - Centre Dramatique National de Normandie)
- 2009 : Demain le Théâtre - songes épars dans l'attente, published by Éditions Les Solitaires Intempestifs (ISBN 978-2-84681-264-1)
- 2009 : Comme disait mon père, suivi de Ma mère ne disait rien, Calentures N°65 et N°66, published by Les Solitaires Intempestifs (ISBN 978-2-84681-265-8)
- 2009 : Le théâtre comme lieu où raconter l'Espace, in Espace, CNES, published by l'Observatoire de l'Espace (ISBN 978-2-85440-014-4)
- 2010 : La Mort d'Adam - Deuxième Mélopée (book + DVD) published by Éditions Les Solitaires Intempestifs (ISBN 978-2-84681-290-0)
- 2011: L'Ombelle du Trépassé (Accompagné de chants Bretons recueillis par Yann-Fanch Kemener) published by Éditions Les Solitaires Intempestifs (ISBN 978-2-84681-3396)
- 2012 : Ghost dance - Collection Nervium (Comédie de Caen - Centre Dramatique National de Normandie)
- 2012 : Addresse à l'ami, in Le Manifeste Hédoniste, published by Michel Onfray's Autrement (ISBN 2746716127)
- 2012 : Ghost Dance - Remugles épars dans l'attente, and L'œil que je suis, published by Frictions N°2021
- 2012 : L'Ombelle du Trépassé (book + CD) published by ÉditionsLes Solitaires Intempestifs (ISBN 978-2-84681-381-5)
- 2013 : Tout allait mieux autrefois, même l'avenir, published by Frictions N°21 22
- 2014 : Space Out Space, in Espace, CNES, Éditions de L'Observatoire de l'Espace (ISBN 9782854400274)
- 2014 : Déclaration de guerre, in Ces cris gravés, Éditions du Chameau (ISBN 978-2-917437-52-0)
- 2015 : Aux frontières du Royaume, published by revue Frictions N°23
- 2015 : L'Armoire du diable, Une fable librement inspirée de contes tziganes, published by Les Solitaires Intempestifs, (ISBN 9782846814423)
- 2015 : La stratégie de la bicyclette, préface de la revue Frictions "Critique dramatique et alentours" rédigée par Jean-Pierre Han
- 2015 : A poetic experience of the world, dans la revue "Imagine 2020 - art and climate change - There is Nothing" rédigée par Claudia Galhos aux éditions Art in site. (ISBN 978-989-95397-6-1)
- 2016 : Richard III - Loyaulté me lie, suivi d'un essai de Raymond Geuss : Richard III, déchirement tragique et rêve de perfection. published by Éditions Les Solitaires Intempestifs (ISBN 978-2-84681-472-0)
- 2016 : Discours d'Alexandrie, published by revue Frictions N°26 - Printemps 2016
- 2016 : La force atomique du fait divers, published by revue Frictions N°27 - Hiver 2016
- 2017 : Car cœur sur la bouche, extraits de poèmes, published by revue Catastrophes, revue électronique d'écritures contemporaines - August 2017
- 2017 : Mon amoureux noueux pommier, (Livre CD), published by Éditions Les Solitaires intempestifs, décembre 2017. (ISBN 978-2-84681-507-9)
- 2019 : The Brook's Clown, éditions Achates 36086 (ISBN 9789811432293)
- 2019 : Fièvres de clown, published by carnets de frictions, Jean Lambert-wild, 2019 (ISSN 1298-5724)*020 : À la guerre comme à la guerre, published by revue frictions N°32, Jean Lambert-wild, été 2020 (ISSN 1298-5724)
- 2020 : La Chanson de Roland - La bataille de Roncevaux, published by Éditions Les solitaires intempestifs, octobre 2020 (ISBN 978-2-84681-616-8)
- 2021 : Pas de gilet de sauvetage pour les poètes, published by revue frictions N°33, Jean Lambert-wild, printemps 2021 (ISSN 1298-5724)
- 2022 : Qui est le clown ? et La Geste du clown, published by revue frictions N°34, Jean Lambert-wild, printemps 2022 (ISSN 1298-5724)
- 2023 : La scène essence...La saine essence..la sénescence...Je ne sais plus, published by revue frictions N.36, Jean Lambert-wild, hiver 2023

== Discography ==
- Drumlike in salty bathtub - 326 Music CD326001
- Spaghetti's Club - "Le point de vue de Lewis Caroll" - 326 Music CD326005
- Spaghetti's Club - "La Conclusion" - 326 Music CD326009
- L'Ombelle du Trépassé - 326 Music CD326013
- Mon Amoureux noueux pommier - 326 Music CD 326014

== Awards and nominations ==
- 1996 : Awarded an "Aide à l'écriture dramatique" grant (Grant for Playwriting), by the French Ministry of Culture, for Splendeur et Lassitude du Capitaine Marion Déperrier.
- 2000 : Awarded a "Villa Médicis Hors les Murs" grant (USA) to research and write Spaghetti's Club - "Le point de vue de John Cage" (Spaghettis' Club – "John Cage's Point of View").
- 2009; CNL's writers grant to write Tête perdue au fond de l'Océan - Première Mélopée (A Head Lost At The Bottom Of The Sea – First Threnody).
- 2010 : Nominated for a Molière Award, in the category "Jeune Public" (Family Entertainment), with the show Comment ai-je pu tenir là dedans (How Was I Ever Able to Live In There?), based on La Chèvre de Mr Seguin (The Goat of Monsieur Seguin) by Alphonse Daudet24
- 2014 : Appointed Knight of the Ordre des Arts et des Lettres by the French Ministry of Culture and Communication
