= Canities =

Canities may refer to:

- Greying of hair, the natural process of hair turning grey or white with age
- Premature greying of hair, greying of hair prematurely happening
- Canities subita, alleged condition of hair suddenly turning white
