= Greying =

Greying may refer to:

- Greying of hair, an effect of aging on hair color
- Greying (album), a 2014 album by The Banner
