= Color&Co =

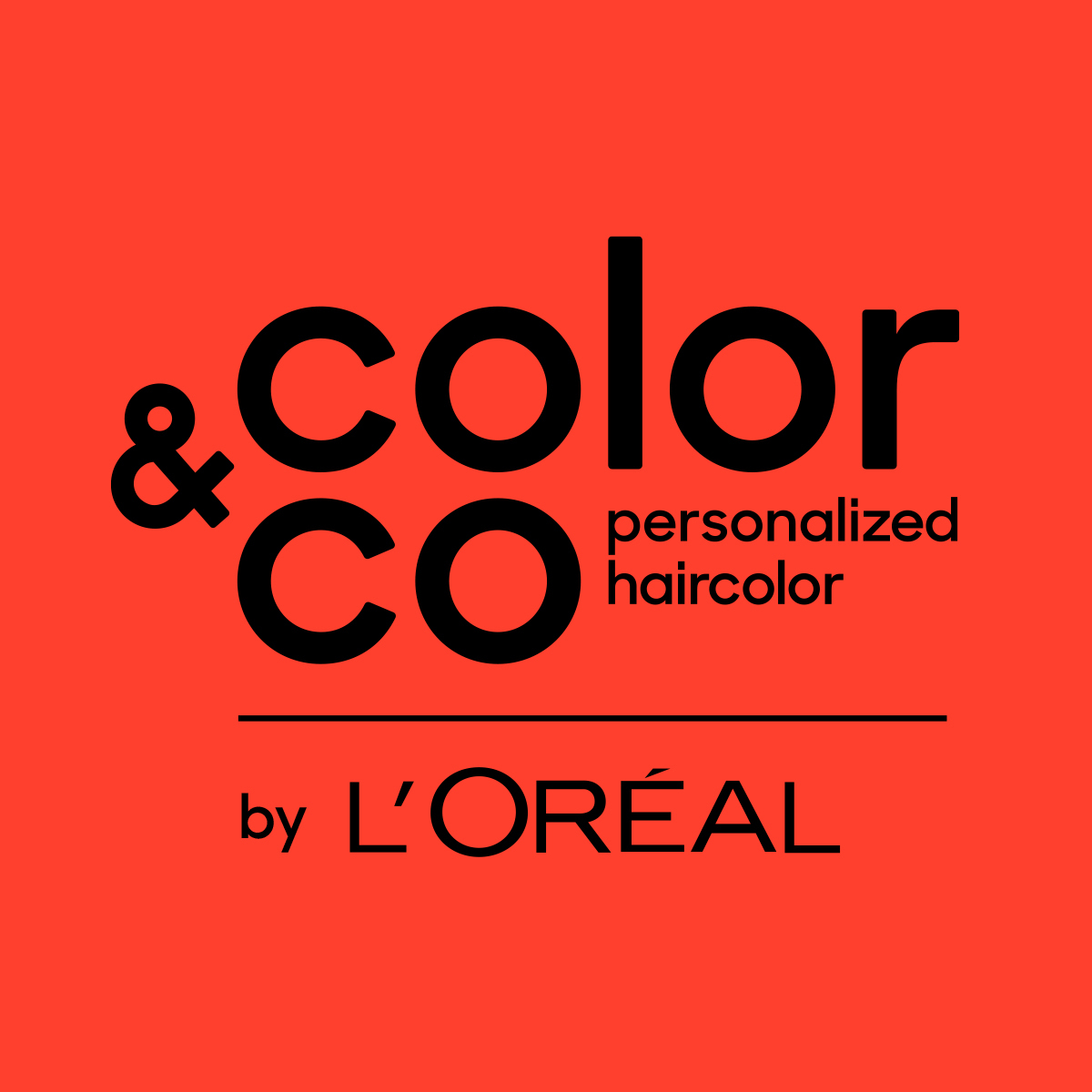
- Company type: Public
- Founded: May 2019
- Headquarters: New York, New York, United States
- Area served: United States
- Products: Hair color
- Parent: L'Oréal
- Website: colorandco.com

Color&Co personalized hair color was an American direct-to-consumer hair color brand that was a subsidiary of L'Oréal. L'Oreal suddenly discontinued the brand in March 2022 and shuttered the website.

Color&Co enabled women and men to consult one-on-one with an independent colorist via live video, and create personalized at-home hair coloring kits based on the colorist's guidance and the consumer's preferences.

== Background ==
Color&Co was founded independently in 2017 by a collective of colorists and tech engineers from L'Oreal Research and Innovation. It was developed within L'Oréal's Technology Incubator. Color&Co launched online in May 2019. Consumers complete a questionnaire to select their hair color or consult with an independent colorist via real-time video chat. Based on the results of the questionnaire, or the outcome of the consultation, Color&Co selects a base color, and adjusts the depth and tone of the shade to create a "Colorbox" which is shipped to the consumer.
