= Human hair color =

Pigmentation of human hair follicles

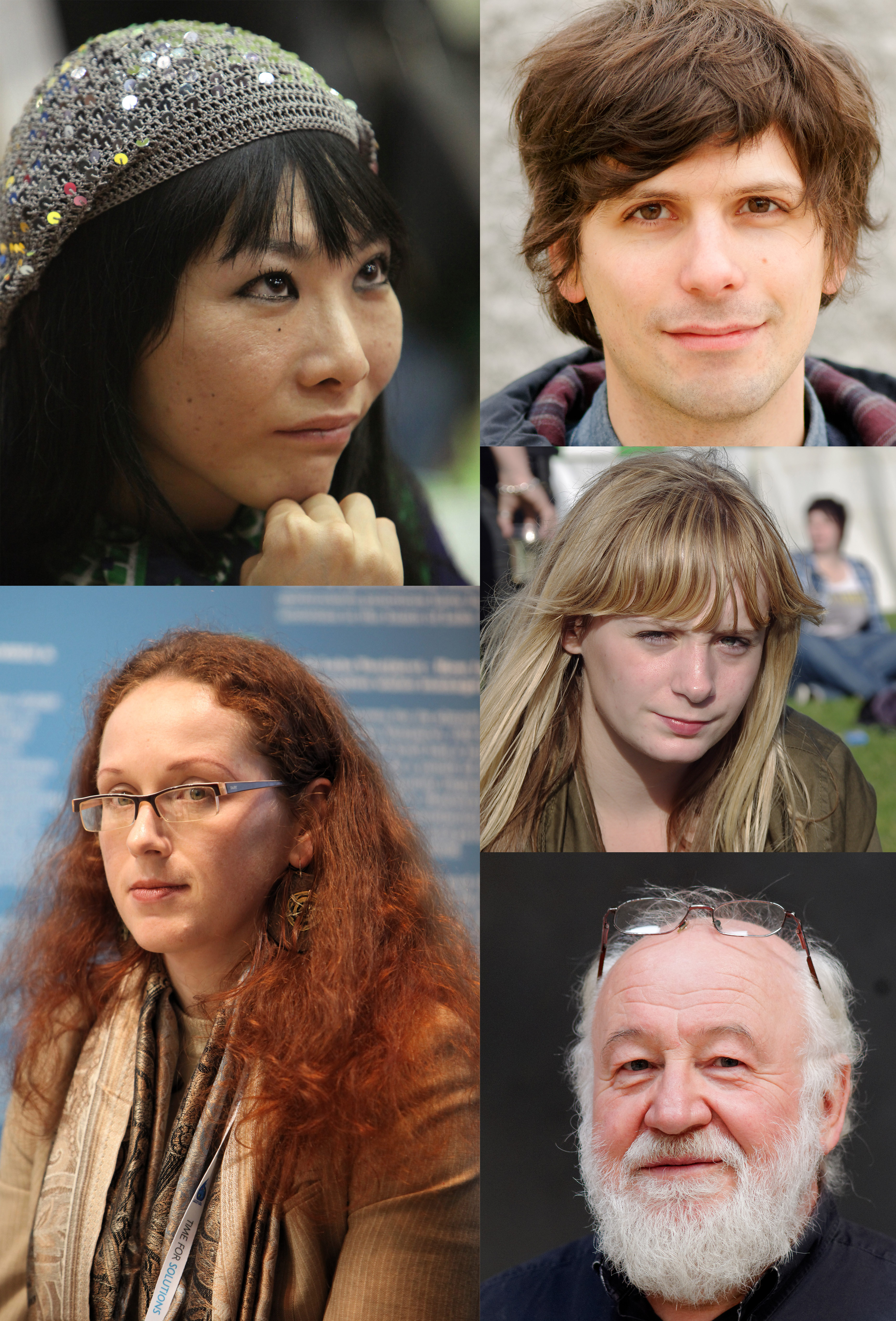
A variety of human hair colors; from top left, clockwise: black, brown, blonde, white, red

Human hair color is the pigmentation of human hair follicles and shafts due to two types of melanin: eumelanin and pheomelanin. Generally, the more melanin present, the darker the hair. Its tone depends on the ratio of black or brown eumelanin to yellow or red pheomelanin. Melanin levels can vary over time, causing a person's hair color to change, and one person can have hair follicles of more than one color. Some hair colors are associated with some ethnic groups because of the observed higher frequency of particular hair colors within their geographical region, e.g. straight, dark hair amongst East Asians, Southeast Asians, Polynesians, some Central Asians, and Native Americans; a large variety of dark, fair, curly, straight, wavy or bushy amongst Europeans, West Asians, some Central Asians, and North Africans; and curly, dark, and uniquely helical hair amongst Sub Saharan Africans. Bright red hair is found in some European populations. Hair turns gray, white, or "silver" with age.

Discrimination based on hair also exists. Blonde women tend to be falsely stereotyped as unintelligent; redheads face vilification; and people with gray or no hair face professional discrimination.

== Genetics and biochemistry of hair color ==
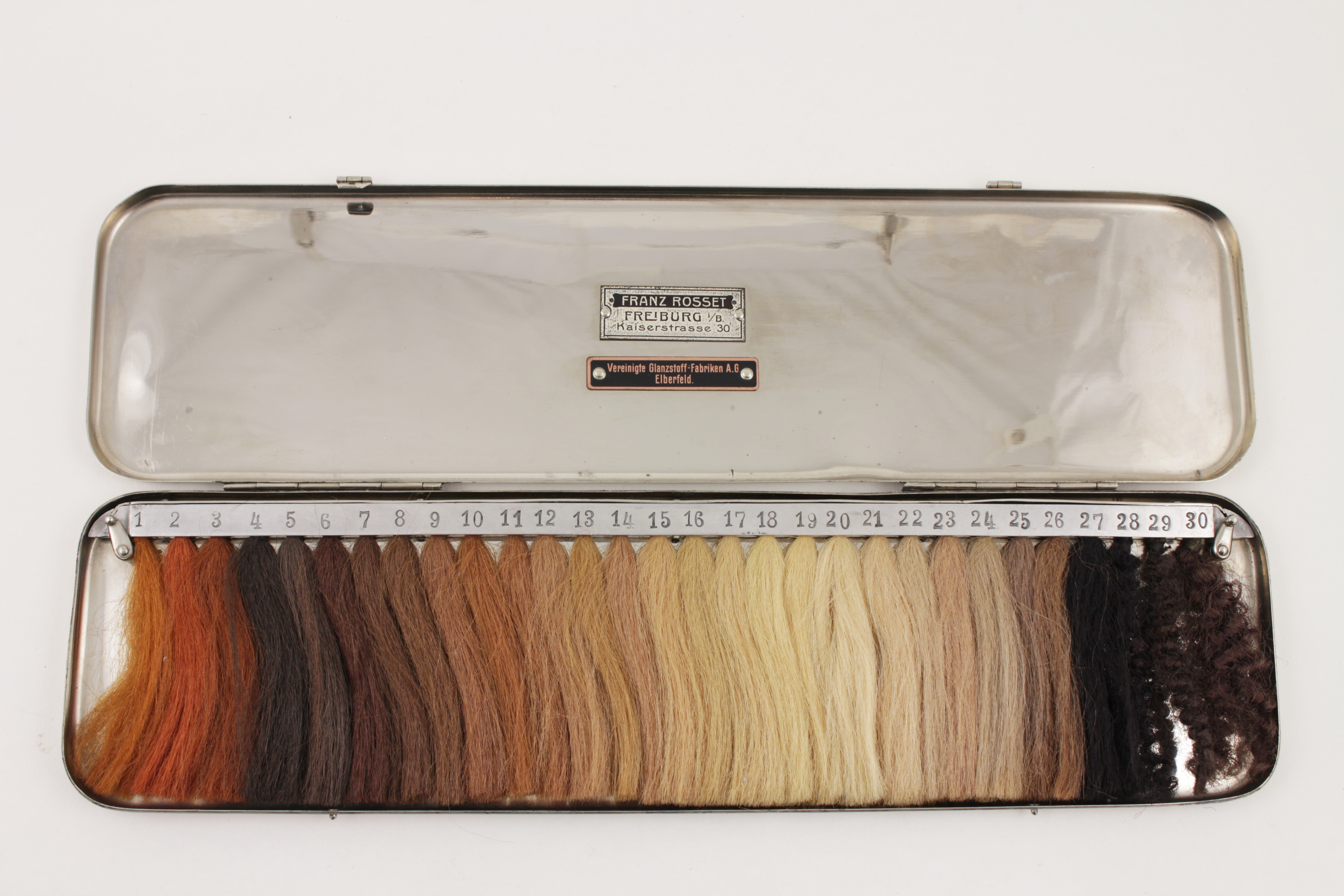
Hair color samples in a box for scientific studies. Early 20th century

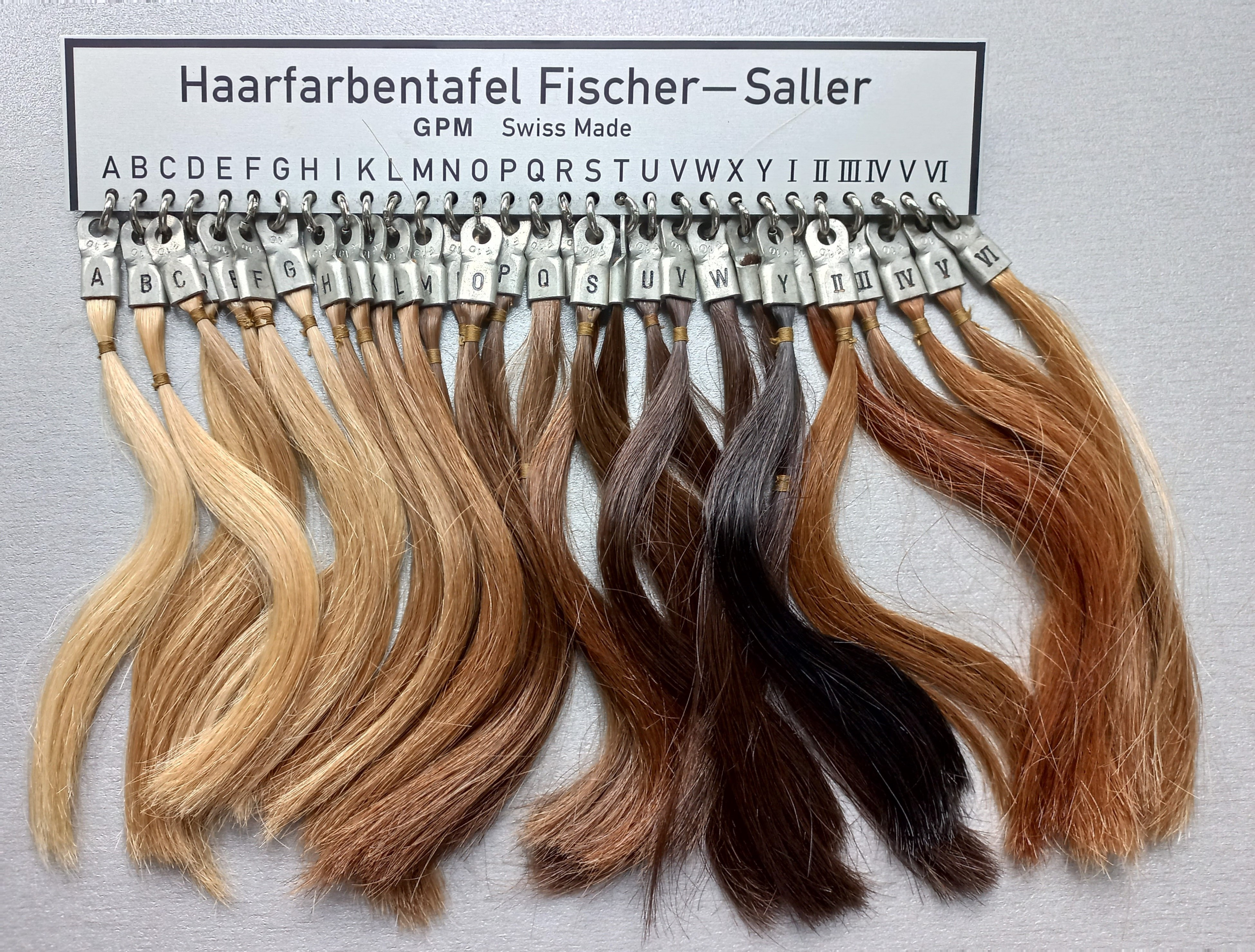
Standard Fischer-Saller's scale of hair color

The full genetic basis of hair color is complex and not fully understood. Regulatory DNA is believed to be closely involved in pigmentation in humans in general, and a 2011 study by Branicki et al. identified 13 DNA variations across 11 different genes that could be used to predict hair color.

The two types of pigment that give hair its color are black-brown eumelanin and reddish-brown/reddish-yellow pheomelanin, both of which are synthesized by melanocytes. Inside the melanocytes, tyrosine is converted into L-DOPA and then L-dopaquinone, which in turn is formed into pheomelanin or eumelanin.

Different hair color phenotypes arise primarily as a result of varying ratios of these two pigments in the human population, although Europeans show the greatest range in pigmentation overall. In addition, other genetic and environmental factors can affect hair color in humans; for instance, mutations in the melanocortin 1 receptor (MC1R) gene can lead to red or auburn hair, and exposure to ultraviolet radiation can damage hair and alter its pigmentation. Ultraviolet radiation (UV radiation) triggers greater synthesis of several compounds, including pro-opiomelanocortin (POMC), α-MSH, and ACTH, the result being increased eumelanin production. UV radiation most commonly comes from the sun, and thus populations from places closer to the equator tend to have darker hair, because eumelanin is generally more photoprotective than pheomelanin.

Pheomelanin colors hair orange and red. Eumelanin, which has two subtypes of black or brown, determines the darkness of the hair color; more black eumelanin leads to blacker hair and more brown eumelanin to browner hair. All human hair has some amount of both pigments. Over 95% of melanin content in black and brown hair is eumelanin. Pheomelanin is generally found in elevated concentrations in blond and red hair, representing about one-third of total melanin content. If there is no black eumelanin, the result is strawberry blond. Blond hair results from small amounts of brown eumelanin with no black eumelanin.

== Natural hair colors ==
Blond	Dark blond	Medium brown	Dark brown	Black	Auburn	Red	Gray	White

Natural hair color can be black, brown, blonde and red.

=== Color shade scale ===
The Fischer–Saller scale, named after Eugen Fischer and Karl Saller, is used in physical anthropology and medicine to determine the shades of hair color. The scale uses the following designations: A (very light blond), B to E (light blond), F to L (blond), M to O (dark blond), P to T (light brown to brown), U to Y (dark brown to black) and Roman numerals I to IV (red) and V to VI (red-blond).

=== Image gallery ===
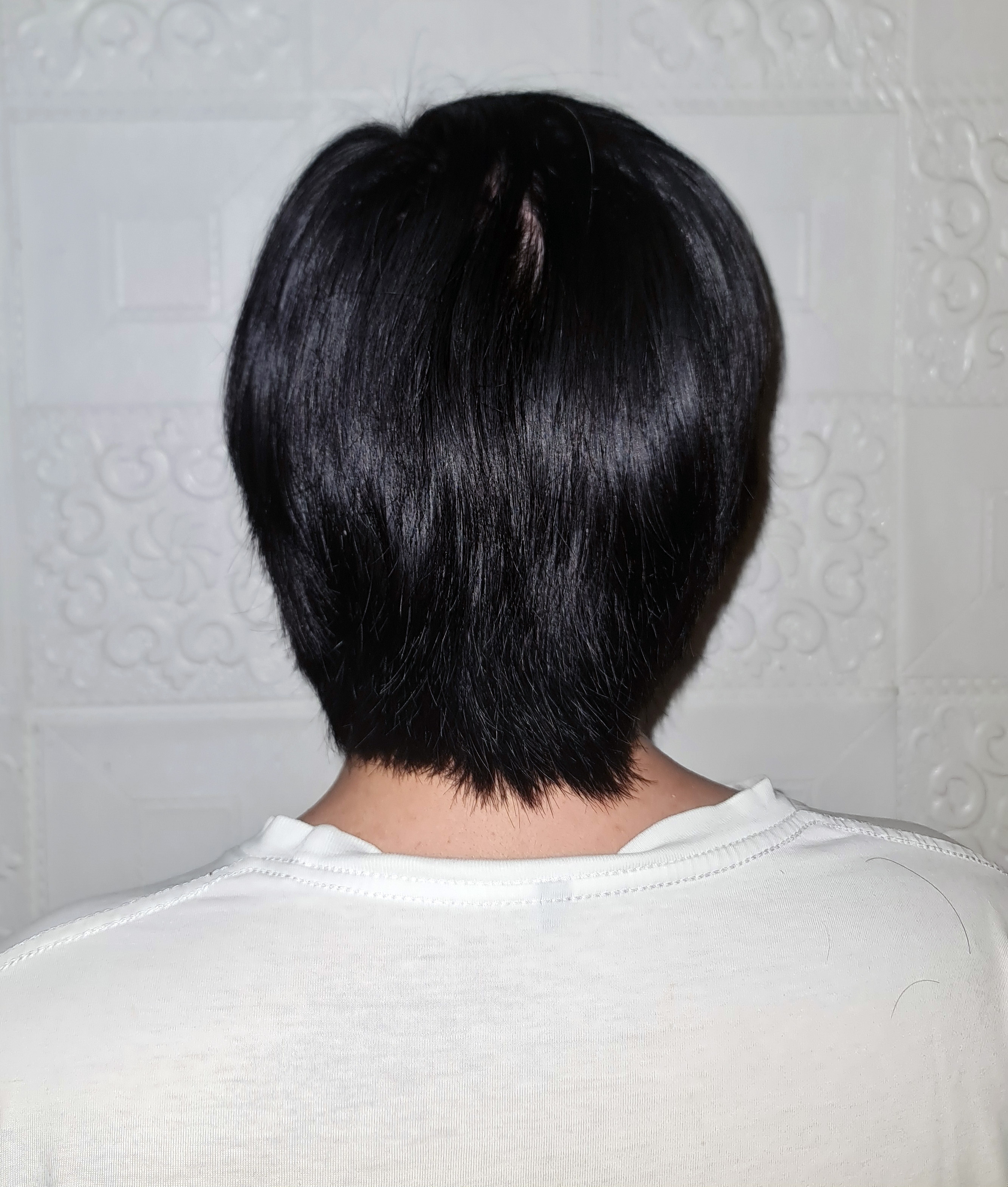
Rear view of black hair

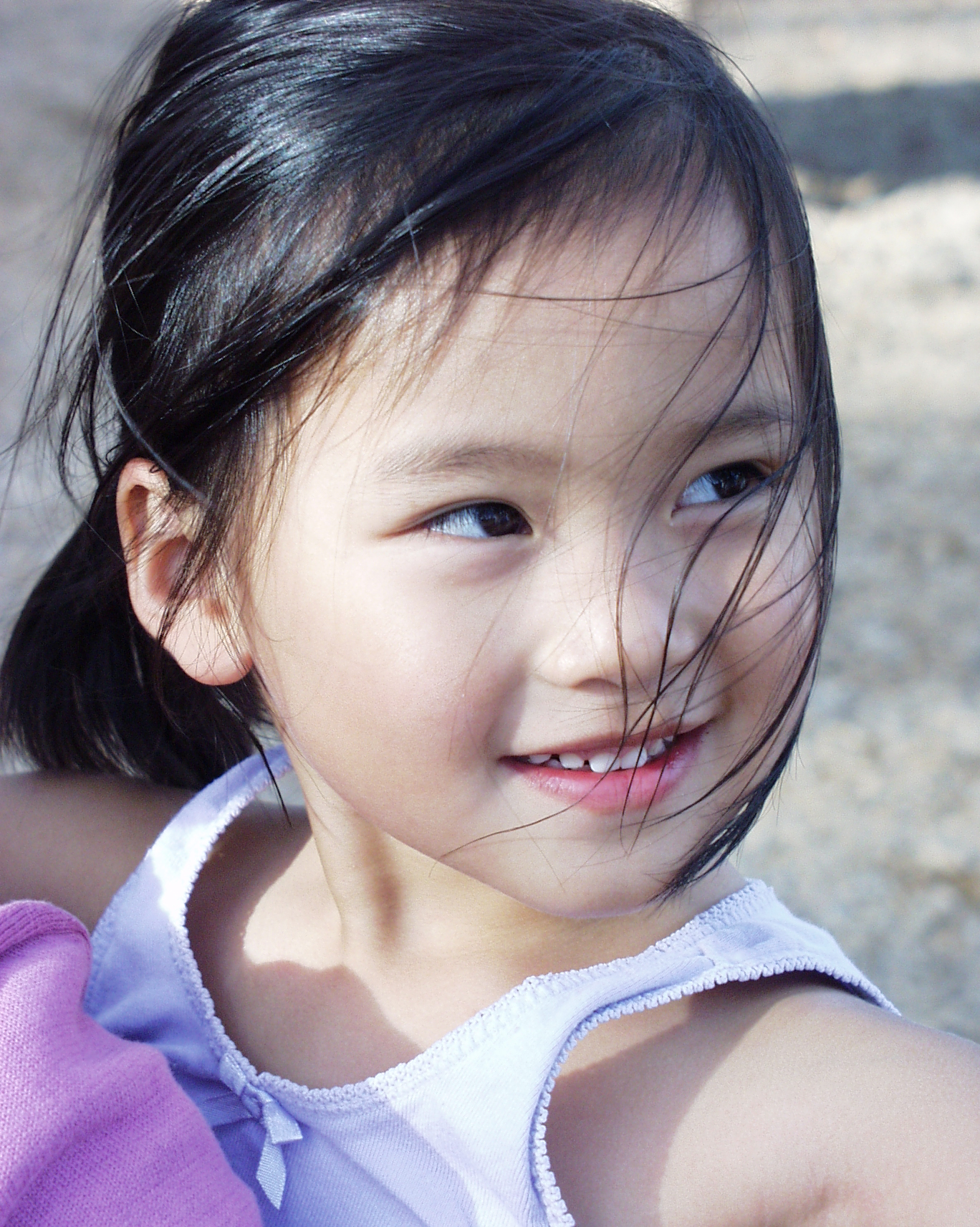
Asian girl with natural black hair

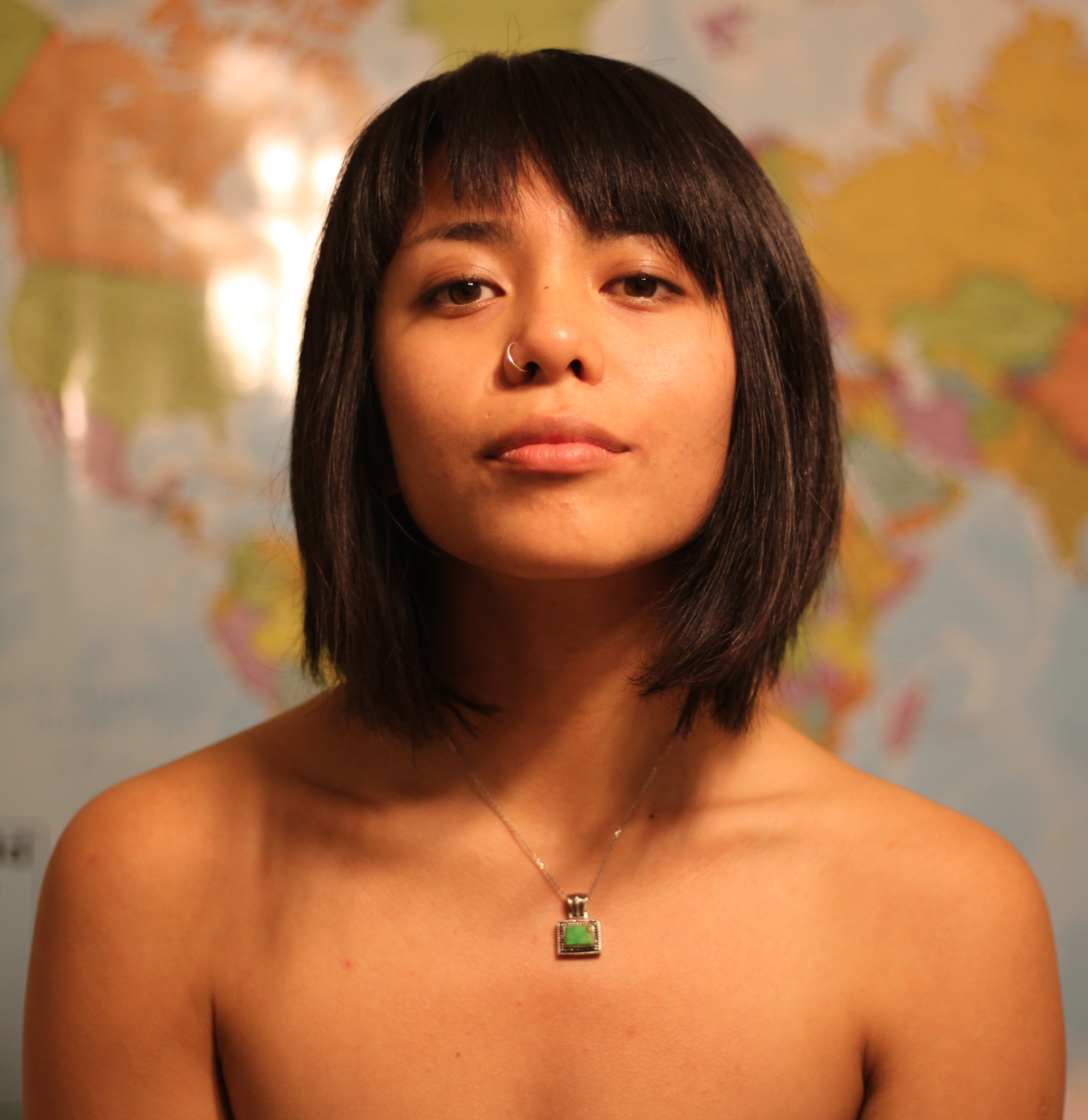
Asian teen with Dark brown hair

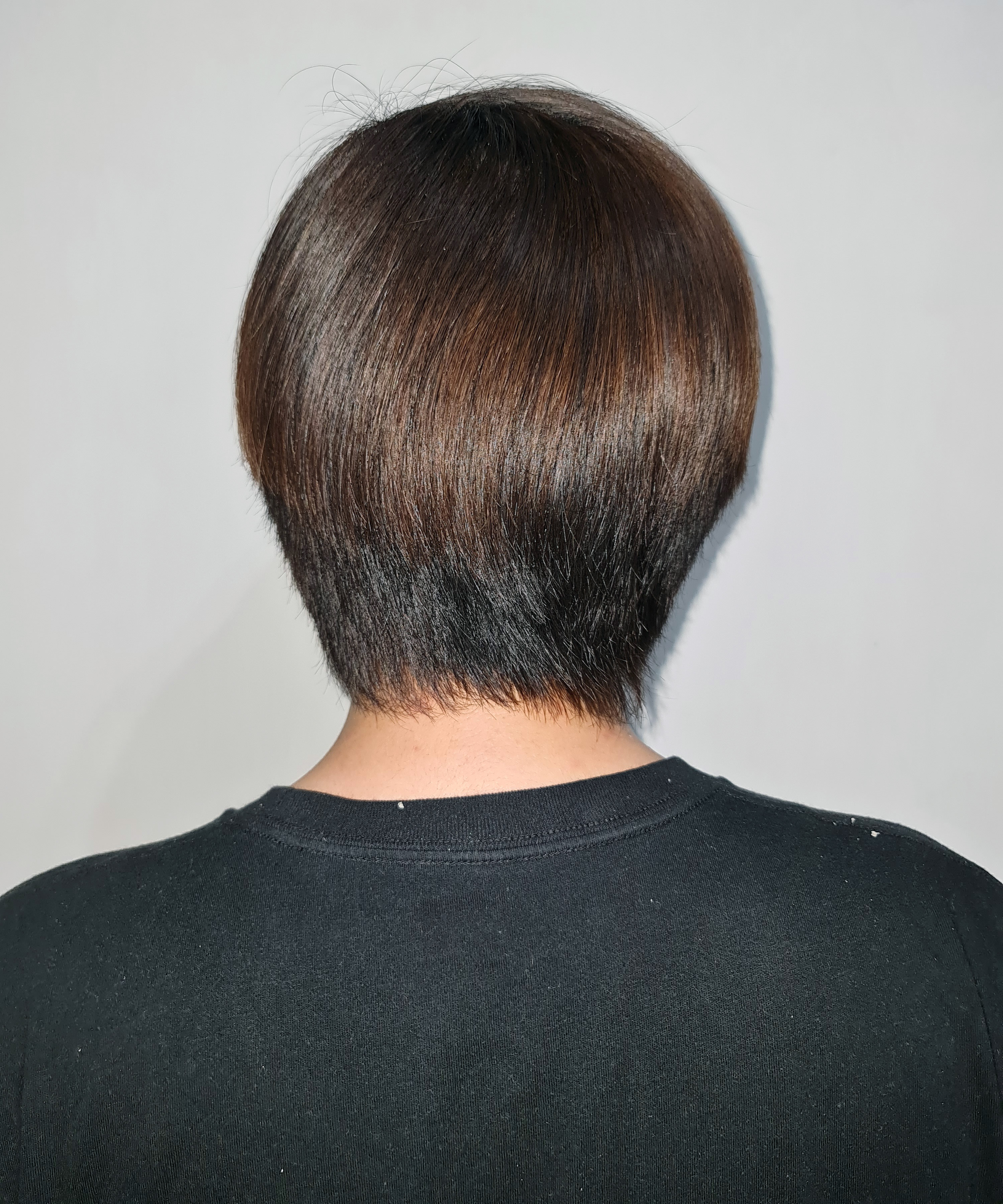
Another rear view of medium-
brown hair

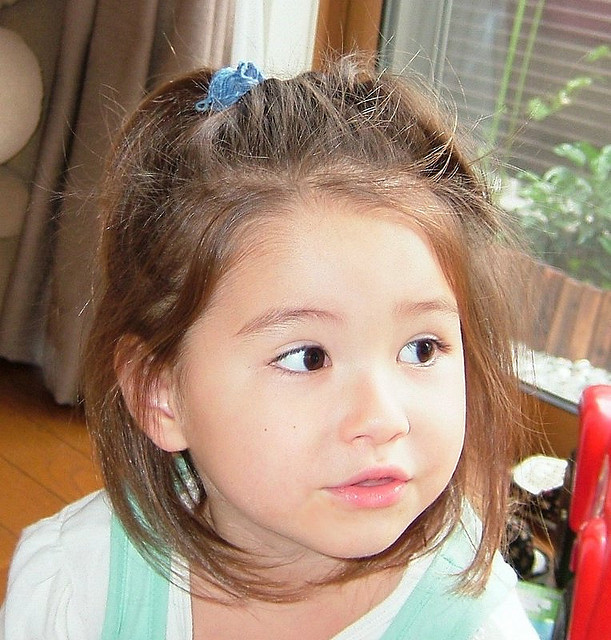
Asian toddler with natural brown hair

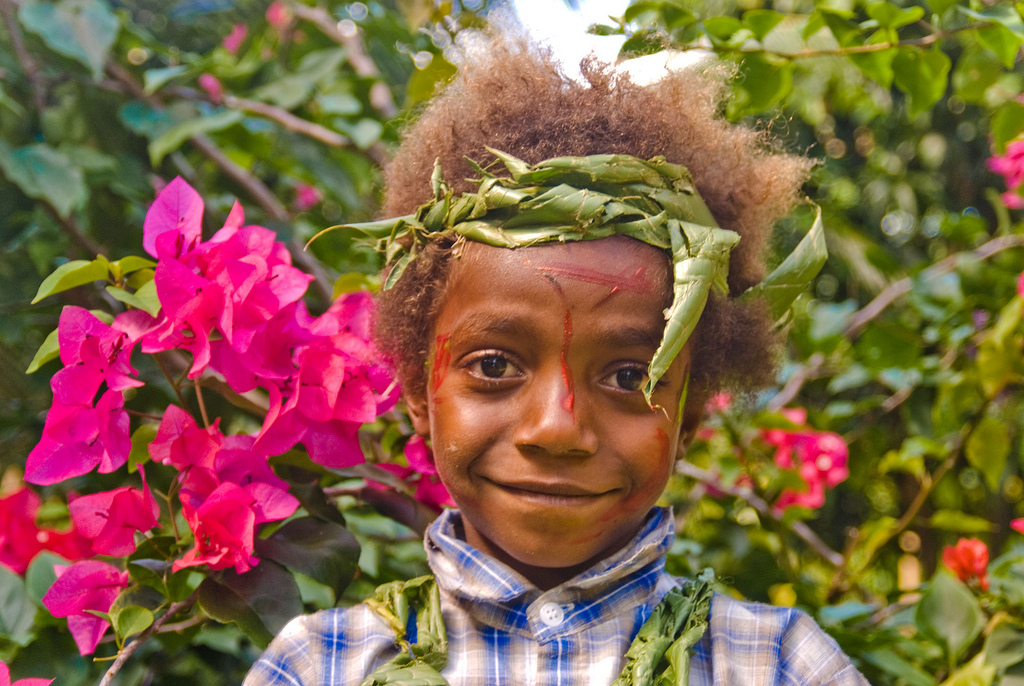
Oceanian boy with light brown hair

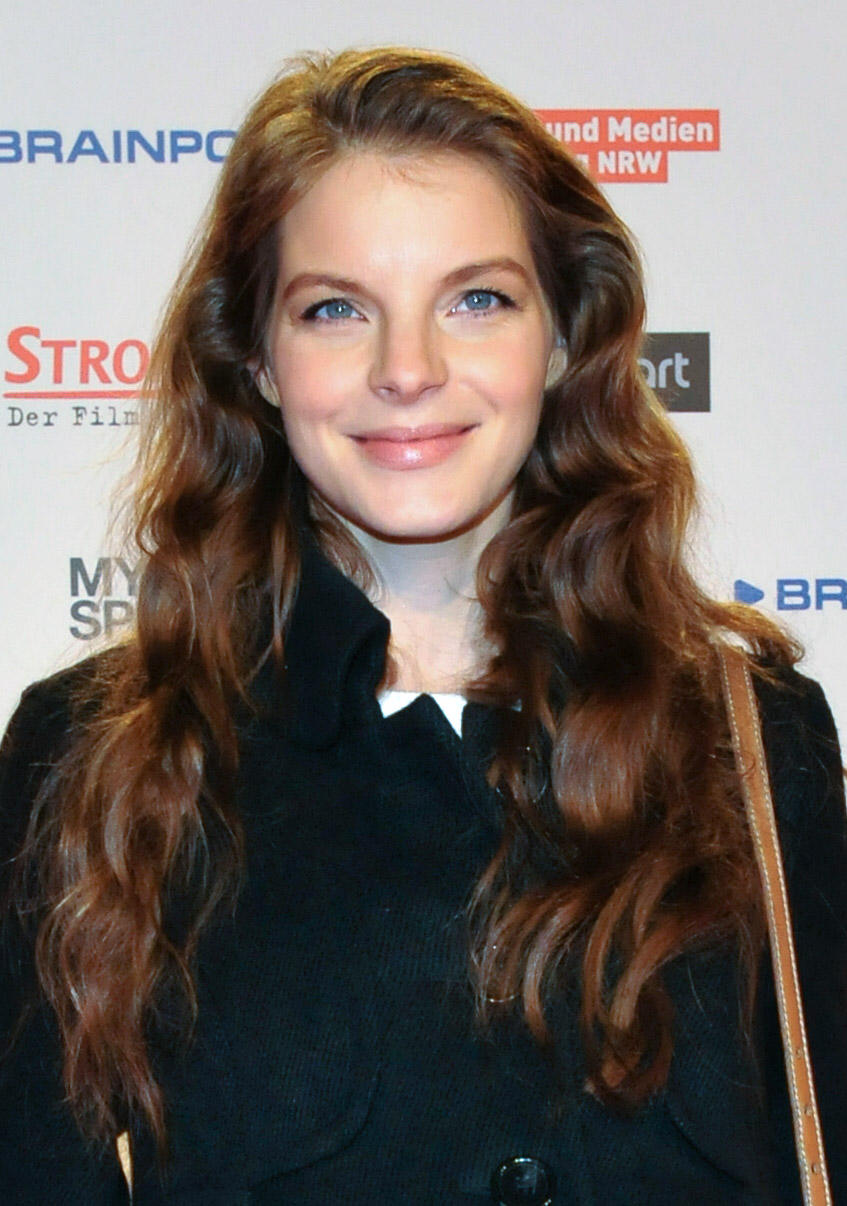
European actress with chestnut-
brown hair

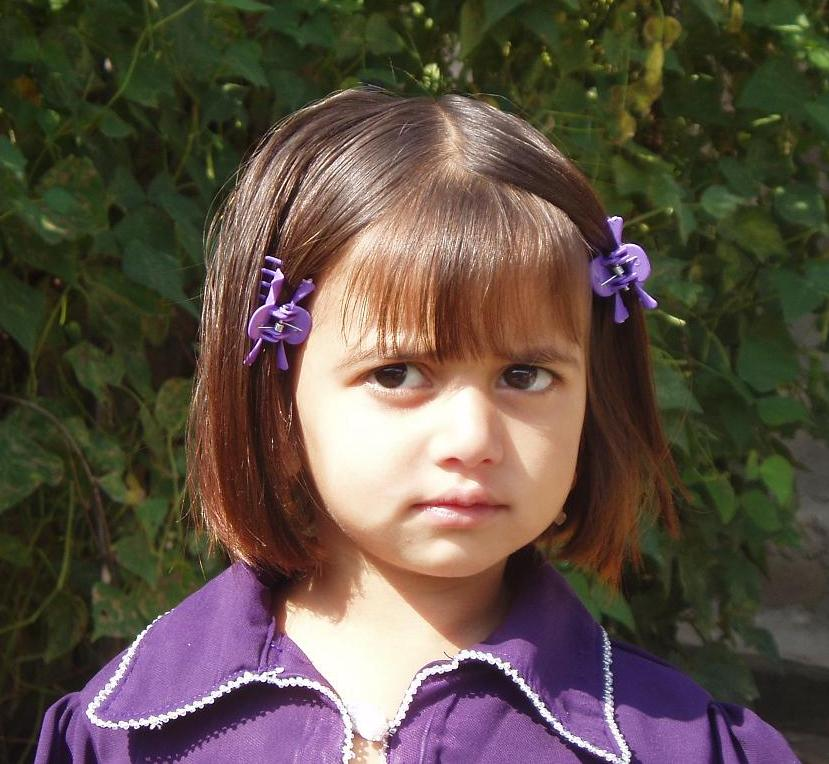
South Asian girl with light chestnut-
brown hair

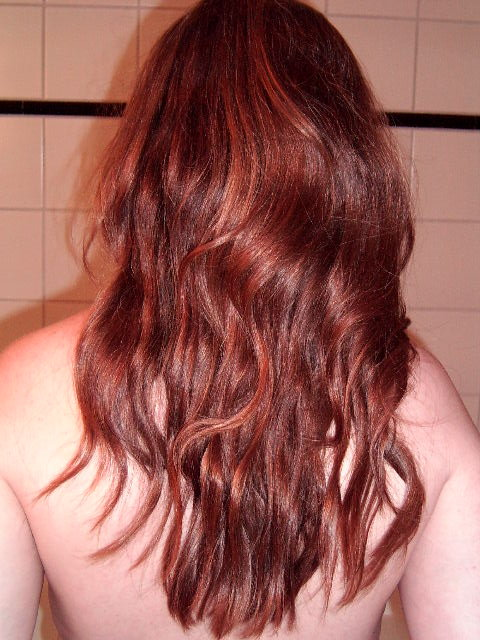
Rear view of a teen with auburn hair

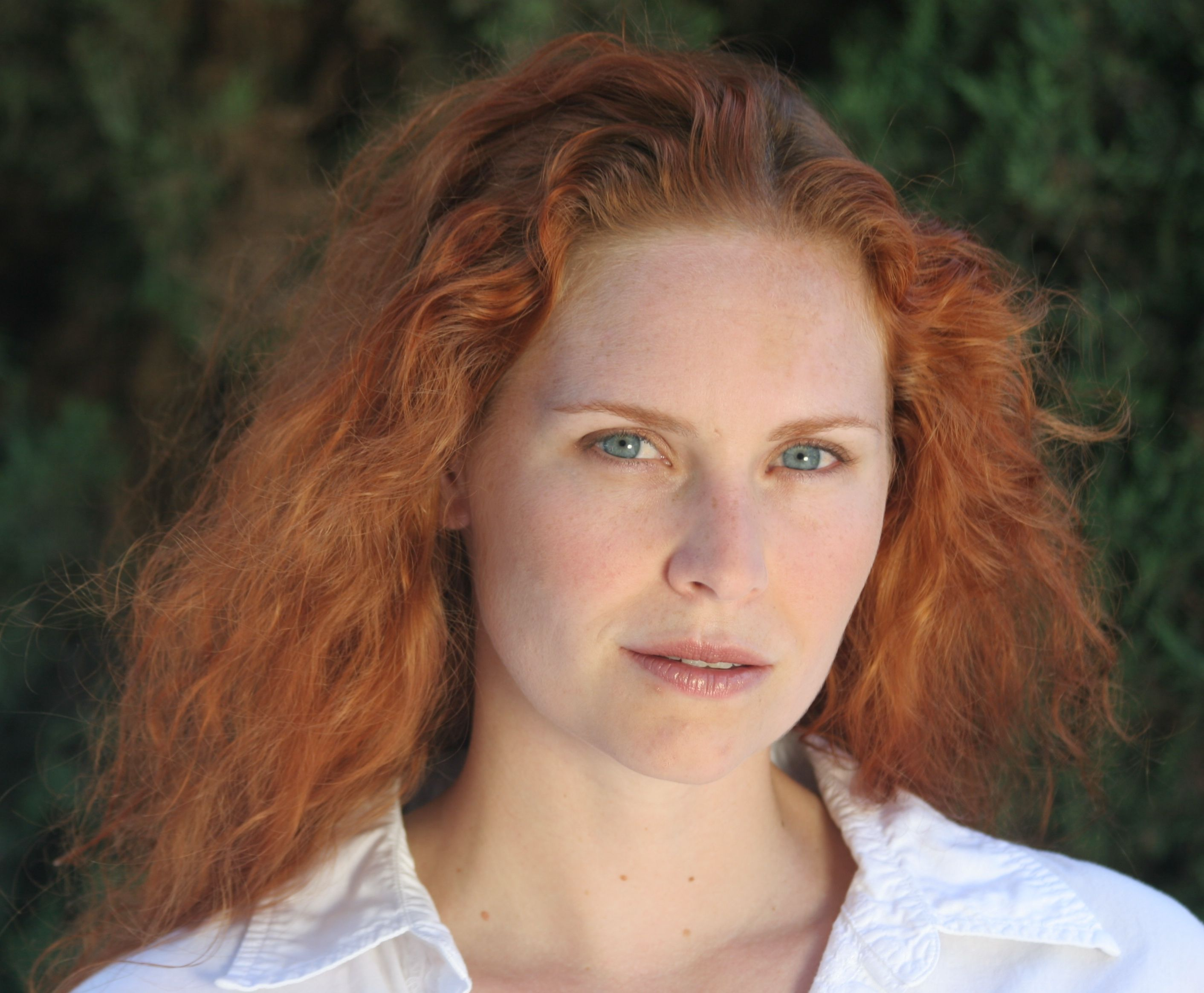
European woman with red hair

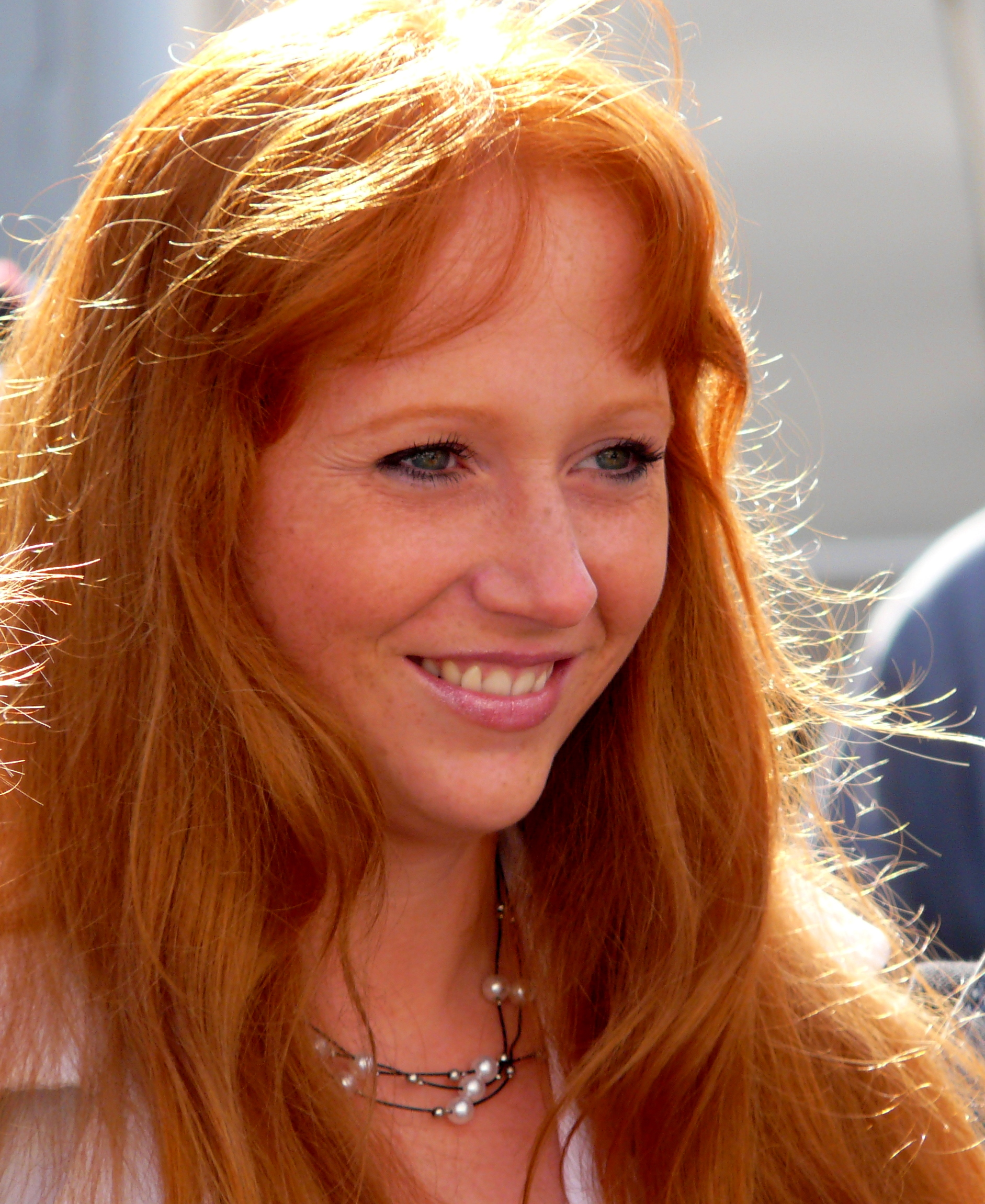
European woman with ginger-
red hair

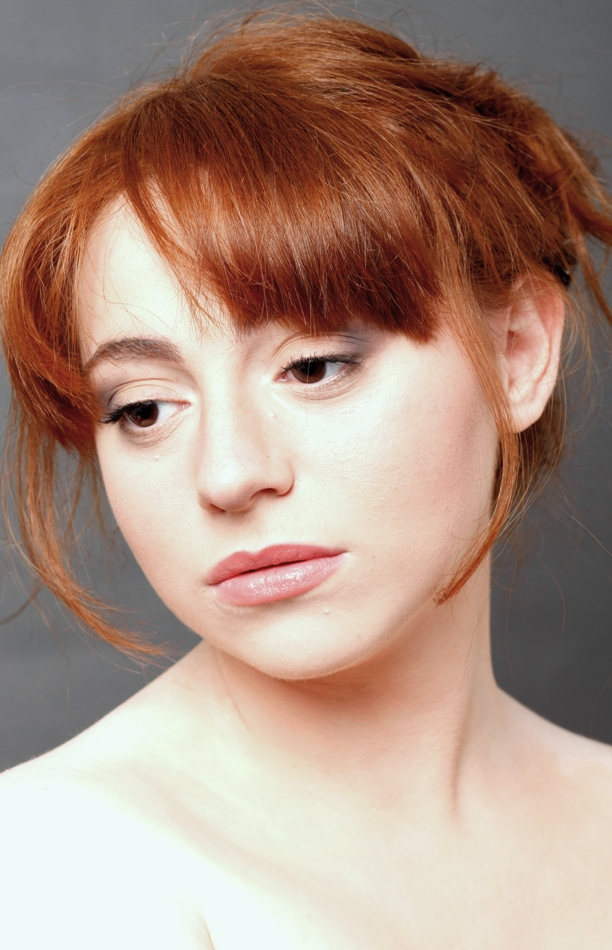
European teen with copper hair

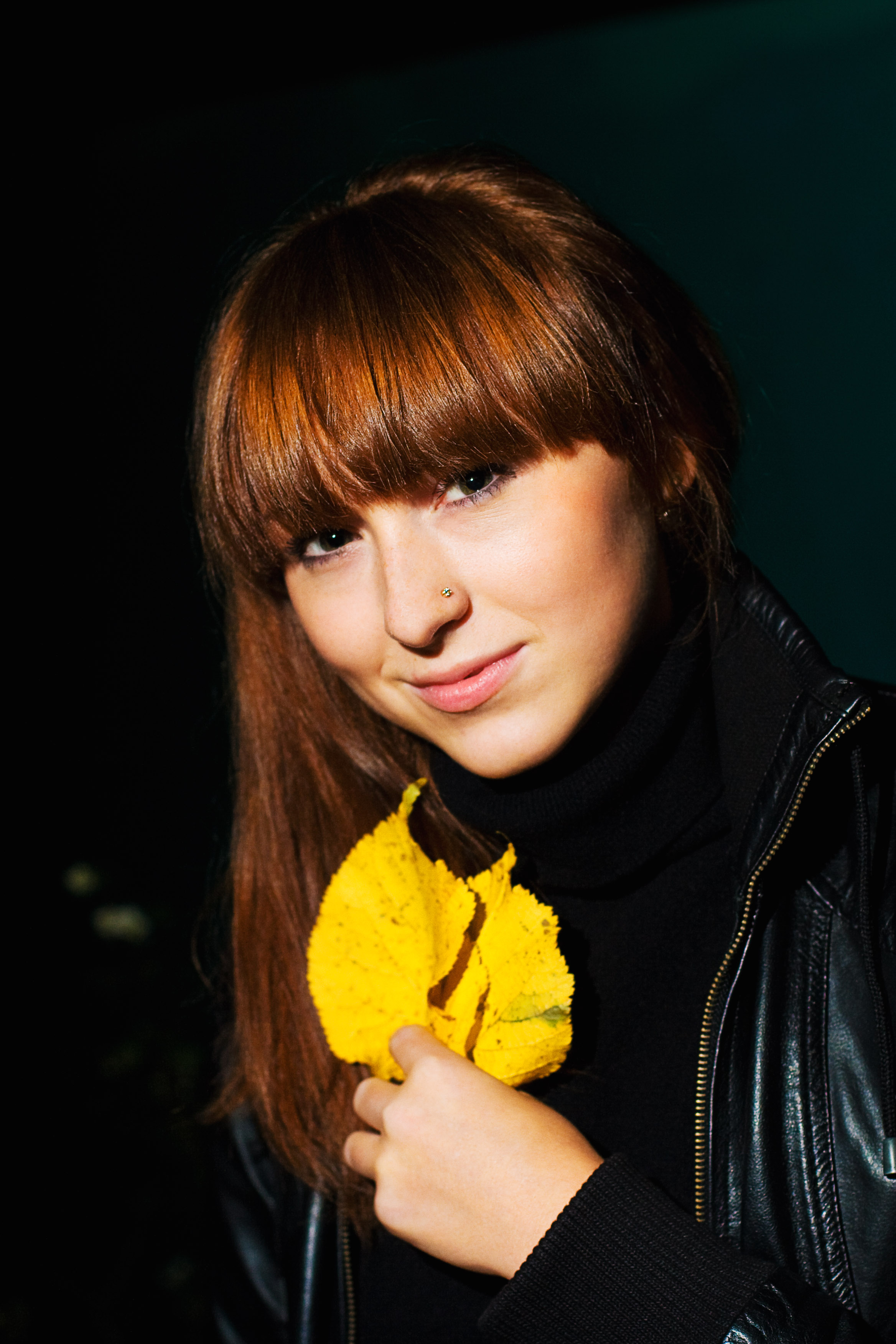
Eastern European woman with
titian hair

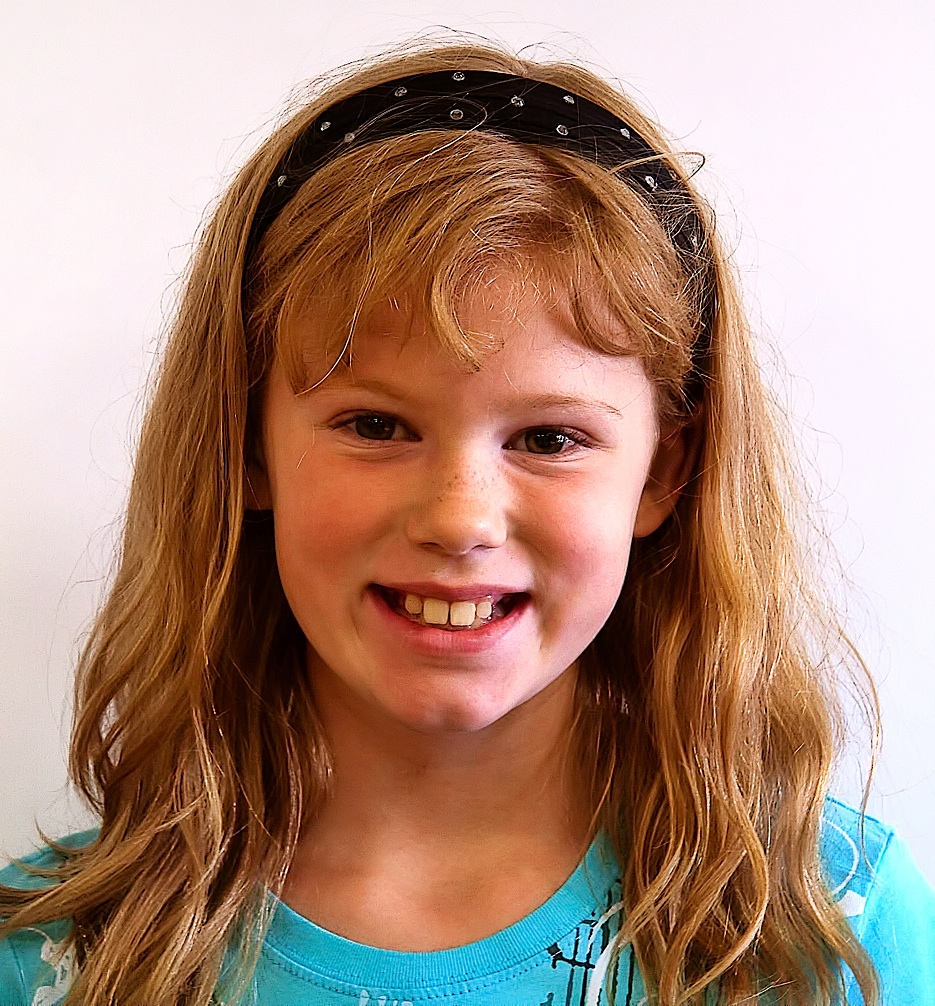
School-aged European girl with
strawberry blond hair

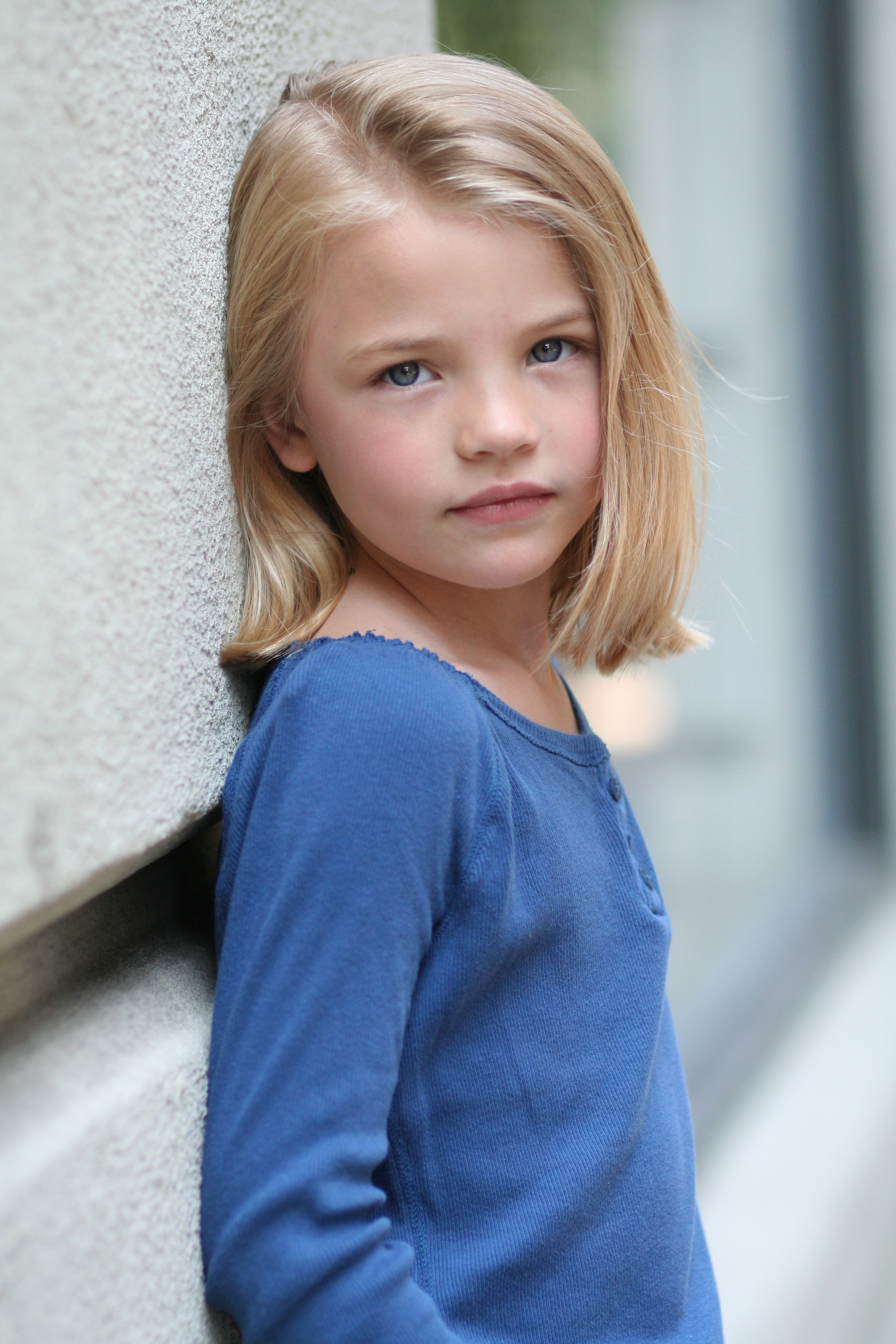
Little European girl with light-
blond hair

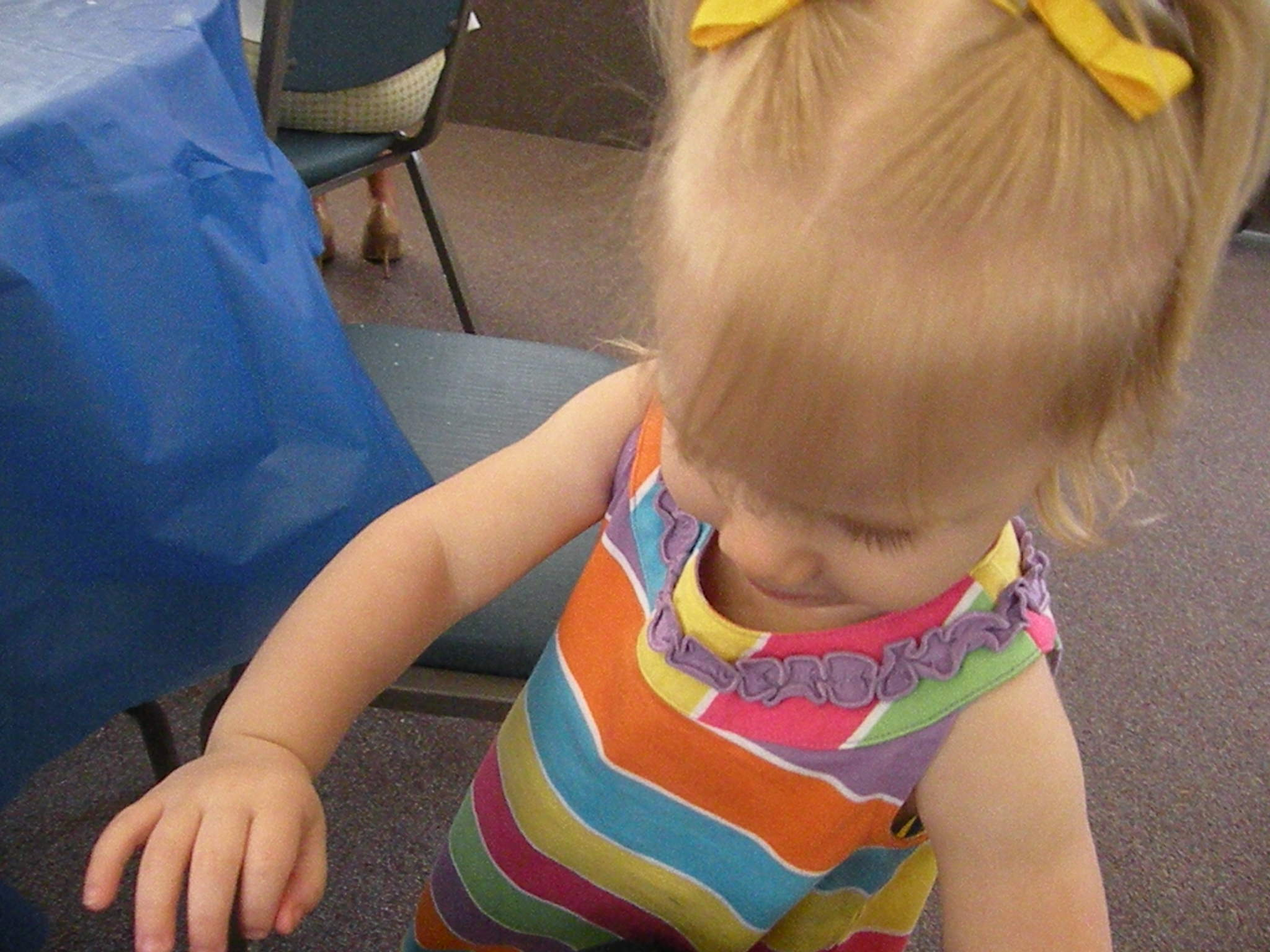
European toddler with golden-
blond hair

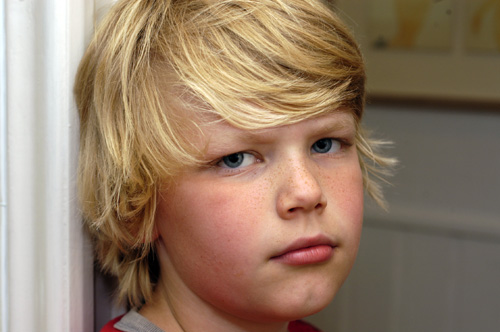
Preteen European boy with medium
blond hair

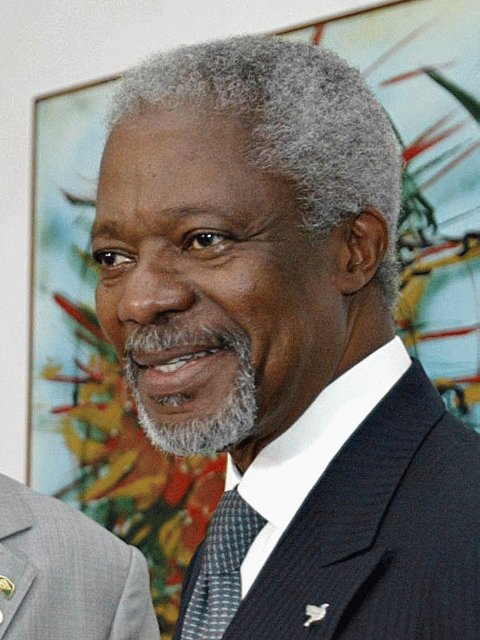
Elderly Black man with gray hair

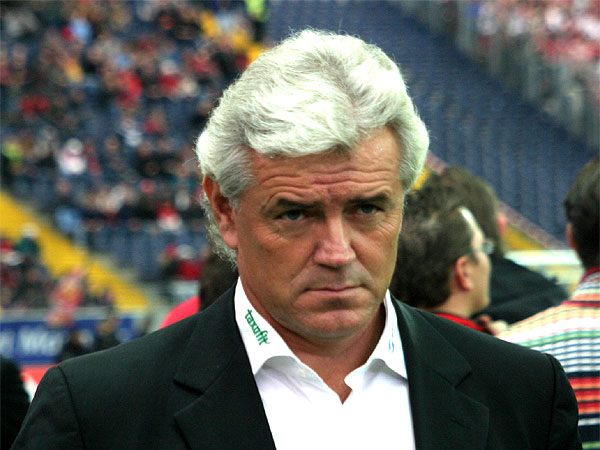
Older European man with white hair
caused by aging

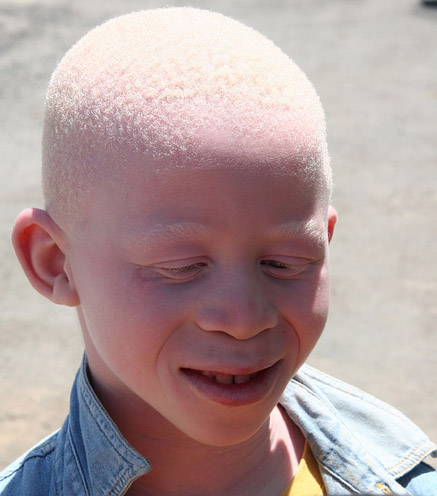
Boy with white hair caused by albinism

=== Black hair ===
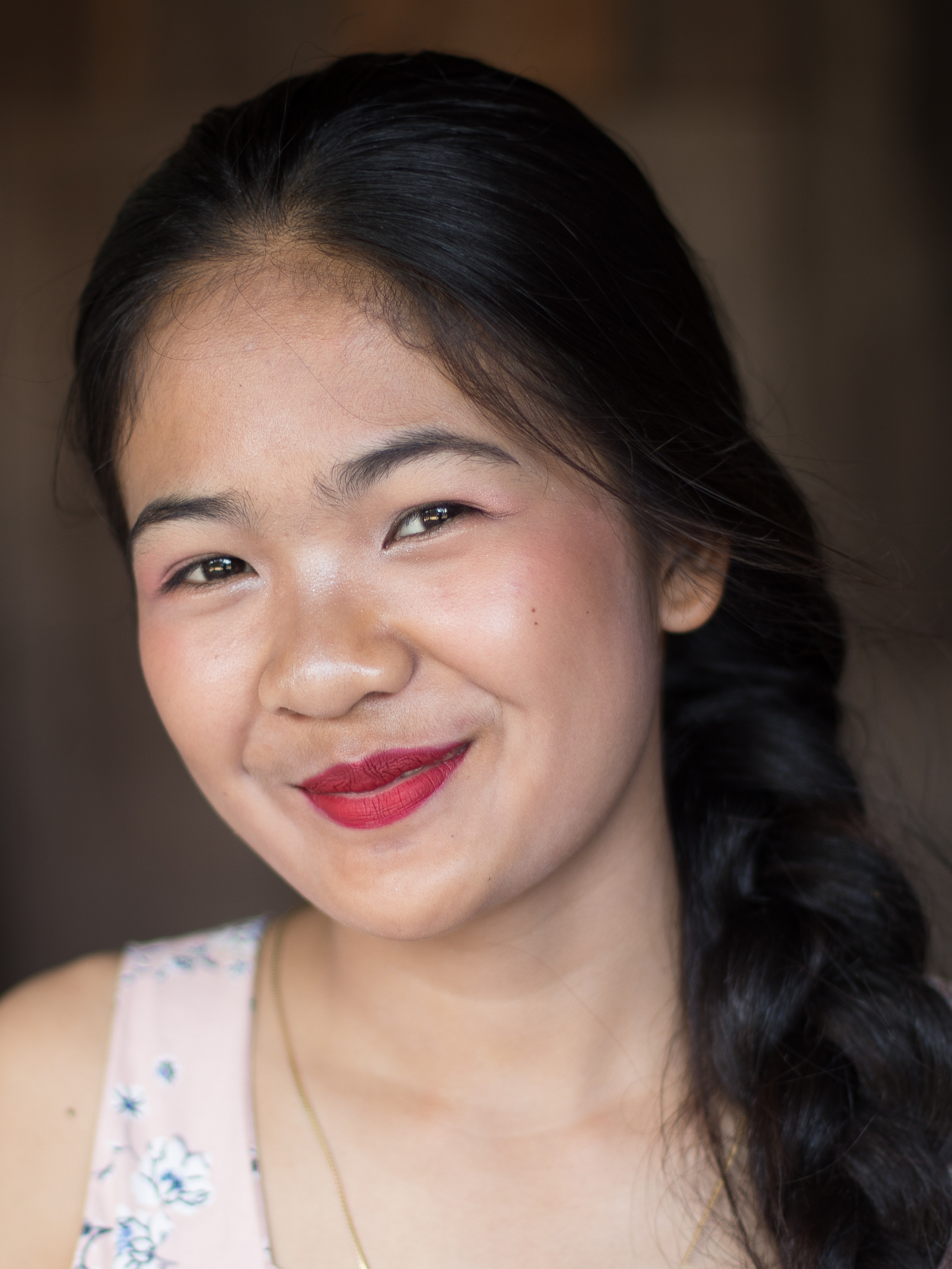
A Lao woman with black hair

Black hair or jet black hair is the darkest hair color. It has large amounts of eumelanin and is denser than other hair colors and is the commonly seen hair color in all of the diverse regions such as Asia and Africa due to the fact that the people in these regions tend to have lower levels of tyrosinase in their bodies. Black eumelanin secretion causes the hair to turn black, which indicates that the MC1R is in the active state. Jet black hair, the darkest shade, will not have a warm, neutral tone but a sheen which can seem almost blue, like the iridescence of a raven's wing; hence, sometimes referred to as raven-black. Jet black hair appears to have reflective silver color in bright sunlight.

=== Brown hair ===
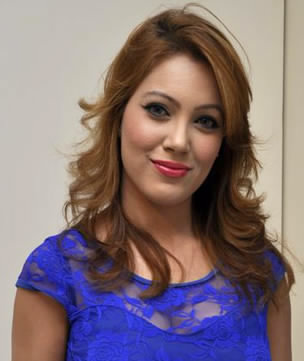
Munmun Dutta, a Bengali actress with brown hair

Brown hair is the second most common human hair color, after black. Brown hair is characterized by higher levels of eumelanin and lower levels of pheomelanin. Of the two types of eumelanin (black and brown), brown-haired people have brown eumelanin; they also usually have medium-thick strands of hair. Brown-haired girls or women of European and Southwest Asian/North African descent are often known as brunettes. Chestnut hair is a hair color which is a reddish shade of brown hair. In contrast to auburn hair, the reddish shade of chestnut is darker. Chestnut hair is common among the indigenous peoples of South, and Central Europe, Asia Minor, West Asia, North Africa and South Asia.

=== Red hair ===
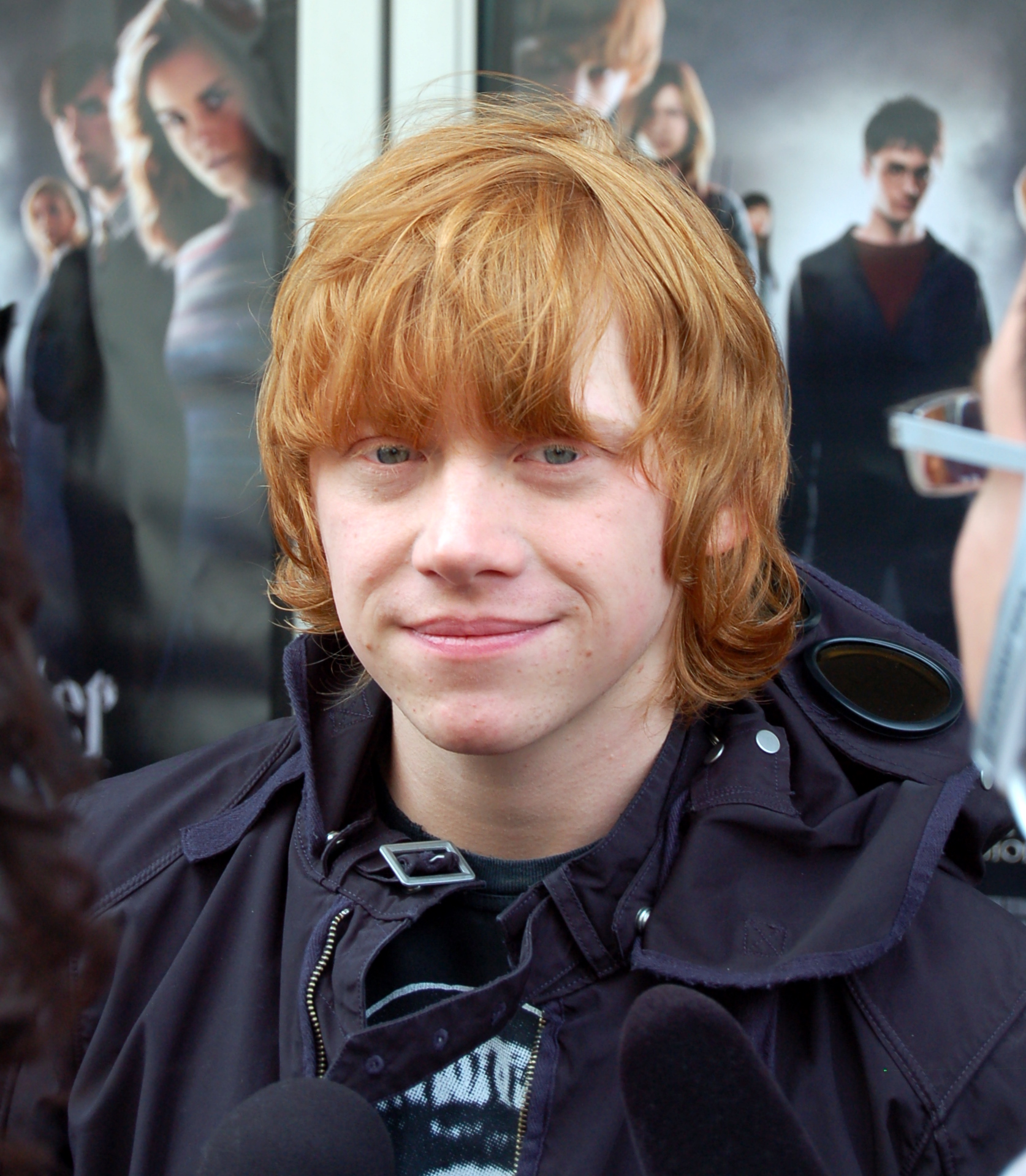
Rupert Grint, a British actor with red hair

Red hair ranges from light strawberry blond shades to titian, copper, auburn, and completely red. Red hair has the highest amounts of pheomelanin, around 67%, and usually low levels of eumelanin. At 1–2% of the West Eurasian population, it is the least common hair color in the world. It is most prominently found in the British Isles and in Udmurtia. Scotland has the highest proportion of redheads; 13 percent of their population has red hair and approximately 40 percent carry the recessive redhead gene. Red hair can also occur in Southern Europe, West Asia, North Africa, South Asia and Central Asia.

=== Blond hair ===
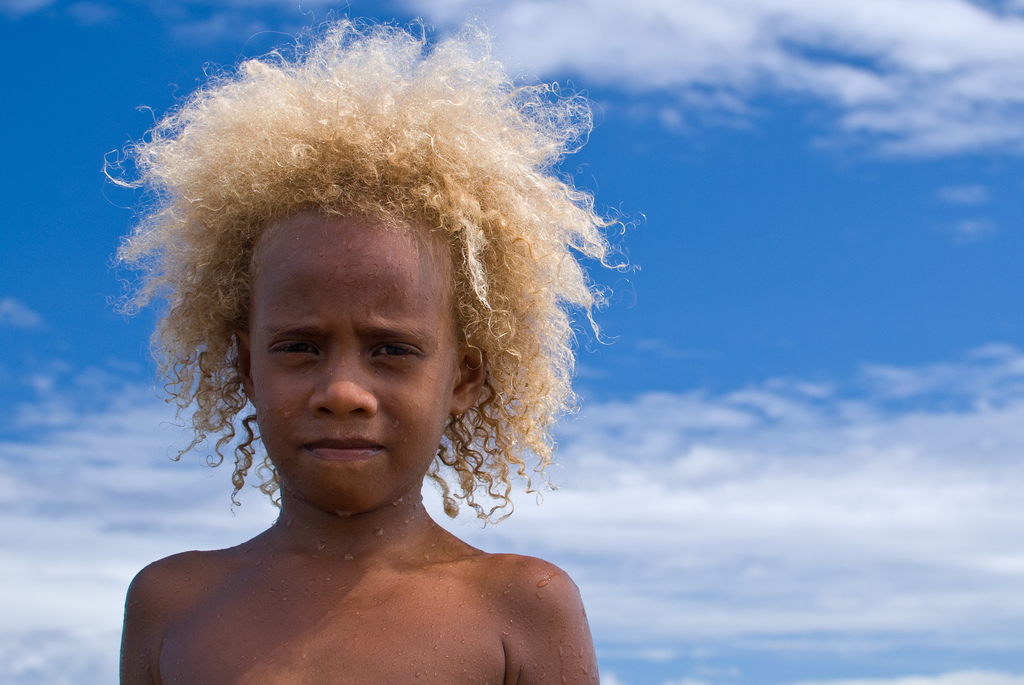
A Melanesian girl from Vanuatu with blonde hair

Blond (sometimes blonde for women) hair ranges from pale white (platinum blond) to dark gold blond. Strawberry blond, a mixture of blond and red hair, is a much rarer type containing the most pheomelanin. Blond hair can have almost any proportion of pheomelanin and eumelanin, but has only small amounts of both. More pheomelanin creates a more golden or strawberry blond color, and more eumelanin creates an ash or sandy blond color. Blond hair is most commonly found in Northern and Northeastern Europeans and their descendants but can be found spread around most of Europe and also among West Asians and North Africans at lower frequencies. It can also be found in South Asia, especially in the northern regions of Pakistan among the Kalash, Nuristani, Pashayi and Burusho people. Studies in 2012 showed that naturally blond hair of Melanesians is caused by a recessive mutation in tyrosinase-related protein 1 (TYRP1). In the Solomon Islands, 26% of the population carry the gene; however, it is absent outside of Oceania.

=== Gray and white hair ===
Gray or white hair is not caused by a true gray or white pigment, but is due to a lack of pigmentation and melanin. The clear hairs appear as gray or white because of the way light is reflected from the hairs. Gray hair color typically occurs naturally as people age (see aging or achromotrichia below).

Marie Antoinette syndrome is a proposed phenomenon in which sudden whitening is caused by stress. It has been found that some hairs can become colored again when stress is reduced.

== Conditions affecting hair color ==
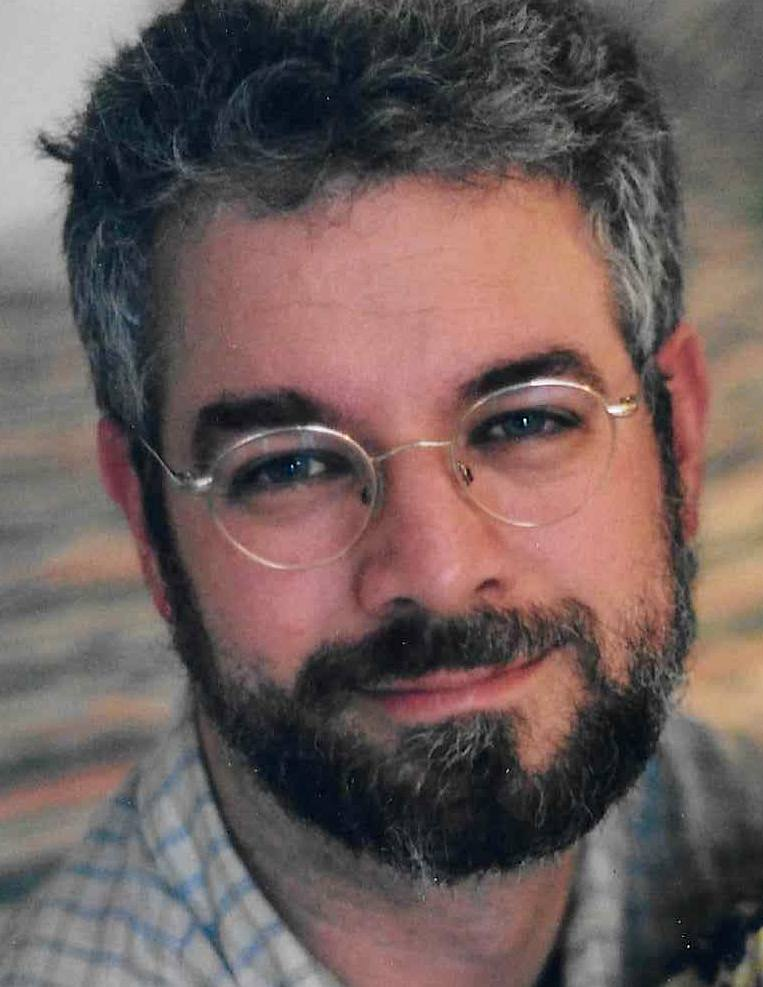
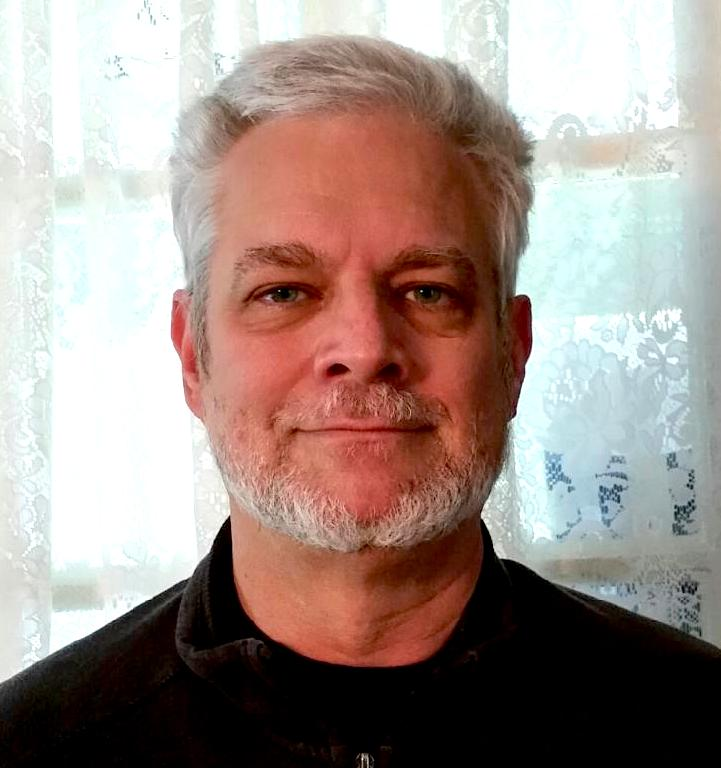
A man at age 41 with partially gray hair (left) and later in life at age 56 with near completely gray hair

=== Aging or achromotrichia ===
Children born with some hair colors may find it gradually darkens as they grow. Many blond, light brown, or red haired infants experience this. This is caused by genes being turned on and off during early childhood and puberty.

Changes in hair color typically occur naturally as people age, eventually turning the hair gray and then white. This is called achromotrichia. Achromotrichia normally begins in the early to mid-twenties in men and late twenties in women. More than 60 percent of Americans have some gray hair by age 40. The age at which graying begins seems almost entirely due to genetics. Sometimes people are born with gray hair because they inherit the trait.

The order in which graying happens is usually: nose hair, hair on the head, beard, body hair, eyebrows.

== Hair coloring ==
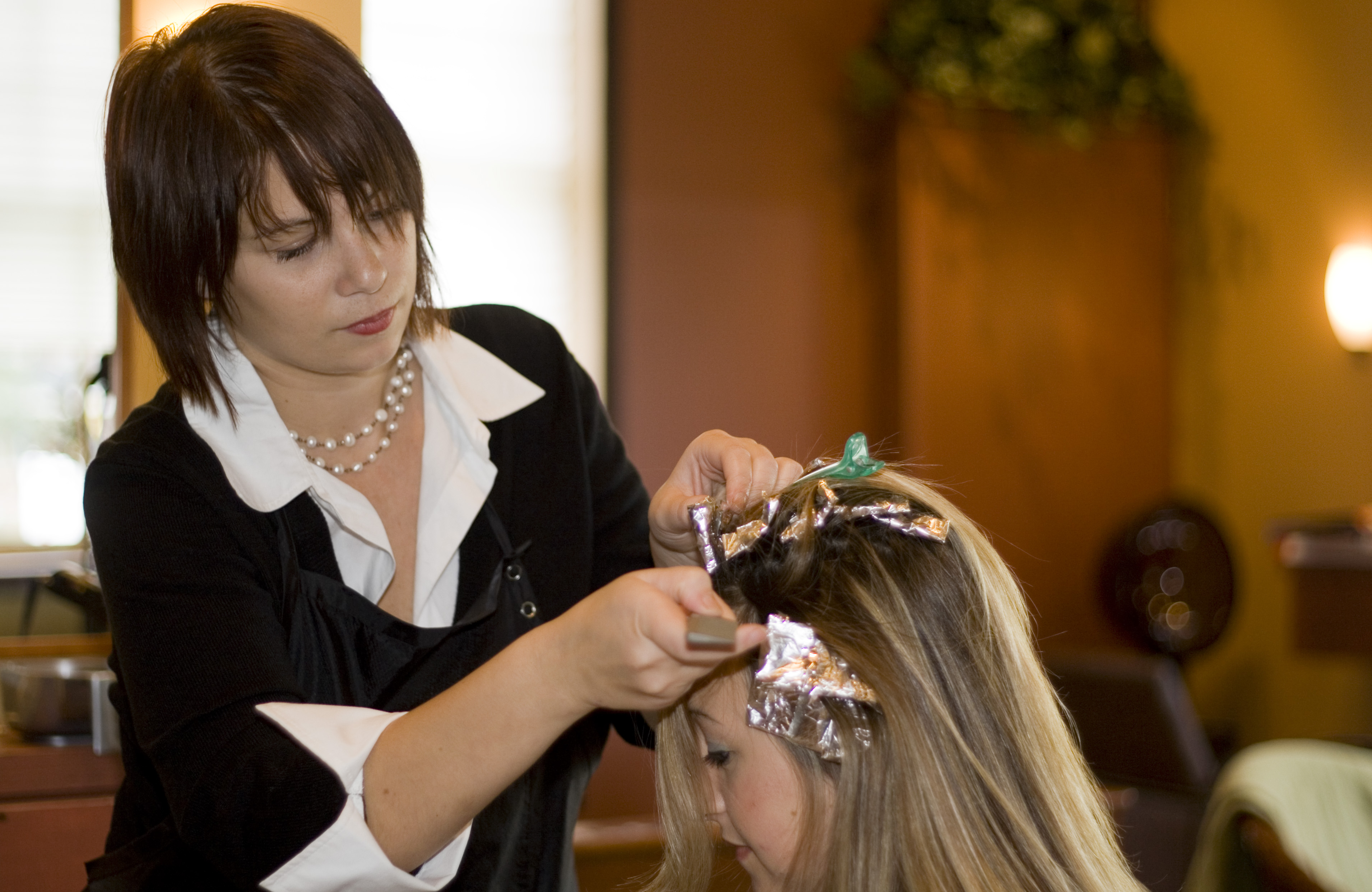
A hairdresser colors a client's hair.

Hair color can be changed by a chemical process. Hair coloring is classed as "permanent" or "semi-permanent".

Permanent hair color means that the hair's structure has been chemically altered until it is eventually cut away. This does not mean that the synthetic color will remain permanently. During the process, the natural color is removed, one or more shades, and synthetic color has been put in its place. All pigments wash out of the cuticle. Natural color stays in much longer and artificial will fade the fastest (depending on the color molecules and the form of the dye pigments).

Permanent hair color gives the most flexibility because it can make hair lighter or darker as well as changing tone and color, but there are negatives. Constant (monthly or six-weekly) maintenance is essential to match new hair growing in to the rest of the hair, and to remedy fading. A one-color permanent dye creates a flat, uniform color across the whole head, which can look unnatural and harsh, especially in a fair shade. To combat this, the modern trend is to use multiple colors—usually one color as a base with added highlights or lowlights in other shades.

Semi-permanent color washes out over a period of time—typically four to six weeks, so root regrowth is less noticeable. The final color of each strand is affected by its original color and porosity, so there will be subtle variations in color across the head—more natural and less harsh than a permanent dye. However, this means that gray and white hair will not dye to the same color as the rest of the head (in fact, some white hair will not absorb the color at all). A few gray and white hairs will blend in visually, but semi-permanent dye alone will not usually give the desired result where there is a lot of gray or white hair present. Sometimes a mixture of dyes is used while hair is greying: semi-permanent as a base color, with permanent highlights.

Semi-permanent hair color cannot lighten hair. Hair can only be lightened using chemical lighteners, such as bleach. Bleaching is always permanent because it removes the natural pigment.

"Rinses" are a form of temporary hair color, usually applied to hair during a shampoo and washed out again the next time the hair is washed.

Unconventional pastel and vibrant hues such as pink, purple, and blue were incorporated.

== See also ==
- Eye color
- Human skin color
