= Black hair =

Human hair color

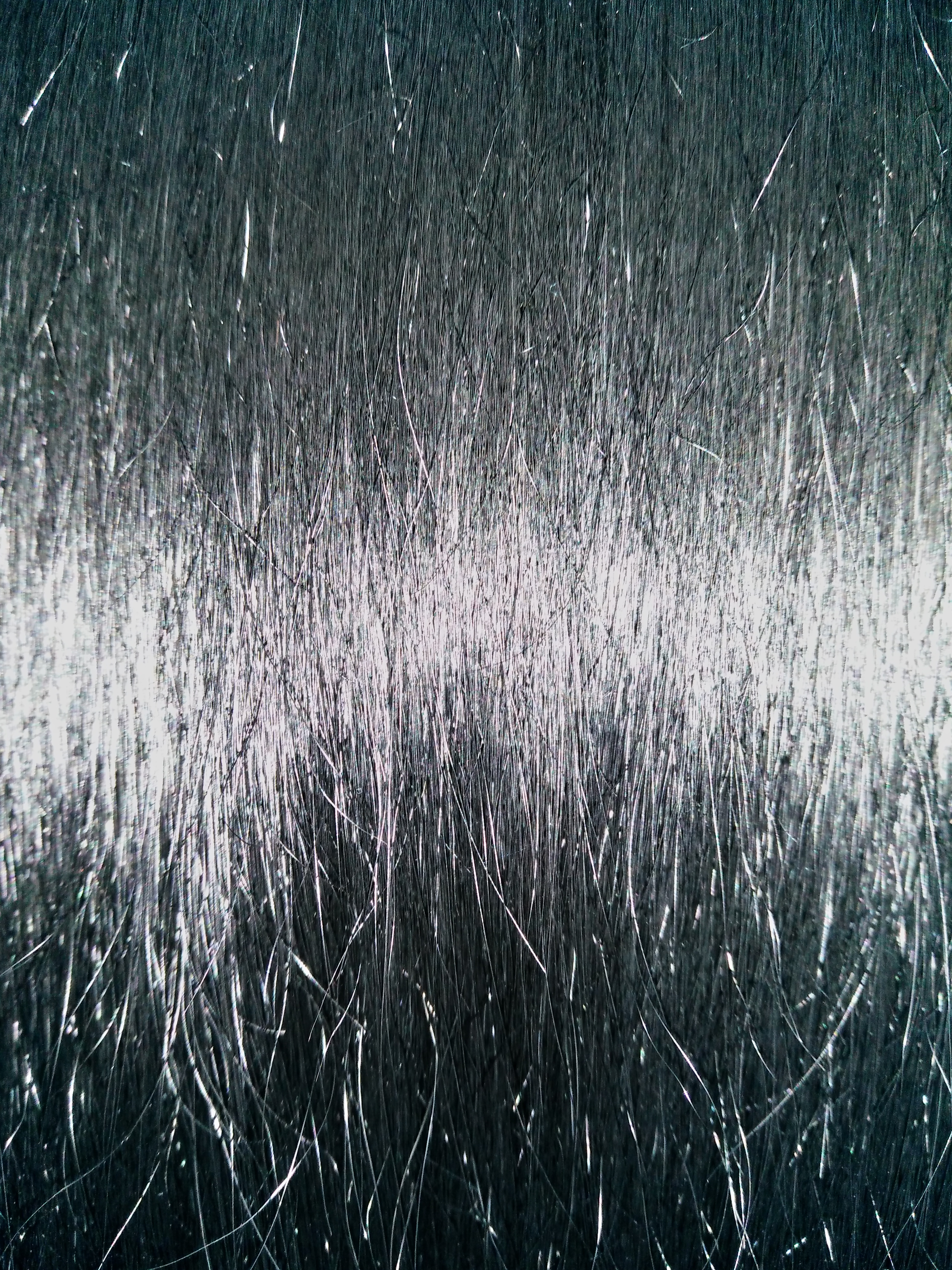
A close-up view of black hair

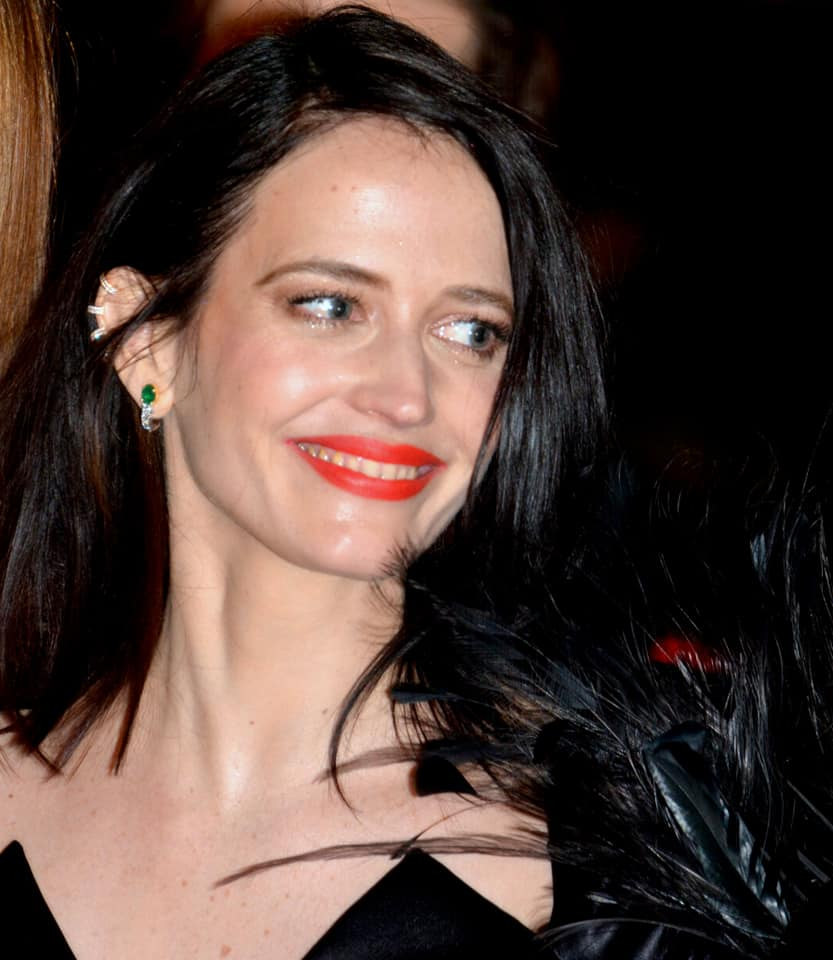
Eva Green, actress of French, Sephardic, and Swedish origin

Black hair is the darkest and most common of all human hair colors globally, due to large populations with this trait. This hair type contains a much more dense quantity of eumelanin pigmentation and no levels of pheomelanin in comparison to other hair colors, such as brown, blonde and red. In English, various types of black hair are sometimes described as soft-black, raven black, noirette or jet-black. The range of skin colors associated with black hair is vast, ranging from the palest of light skin tones to dark skin. Black-haired humans can have dark or light eyes, but more commonly dark.

== Distribution ==
Black hair is most commonly found in Asia and Africa. The characteristic can also be seen throughout Europe as well, though it is considerably less common. Black hair in Europe is concentrated highest in the Southern half of the continent, with Greece, Portugal, Cyprus, Turkey, Malta, Southern Italy, Spain and Albania alongside parts of Bulgaria and Romania being regions with the highest frequencies of the trait. Black hair is to a lesser extent present in Northern Europe, where it is most frequent in the British Isles and is especially prominent amongst people from Wales, Cornwall and parts of Ireland. The high occurrence of dark hair in these northern regions led to theories about admixture from the Mediterranean, most famously that of the "Black Irish" in Ireland, though modern genetic studies find little evidence of ancestry from southern Europe to support that theory.

== Varieties of black hair ==
- raven black

Naturally, hair has reflective properties, which is the reason why most black hair types do not appear fully dark in light. However, the darkest shade of black hair, raven-black, does not behave as other hair would in the light. The name of the color comes from a raven’s wing due to similarities in behavior. Appearing as being almost blue in some conditions, this hair color is mostly found with people from Africa, South and Southeast Asia, East Asia, Central Asia and Latin America.

True black hair is similar to a black cat's fur.

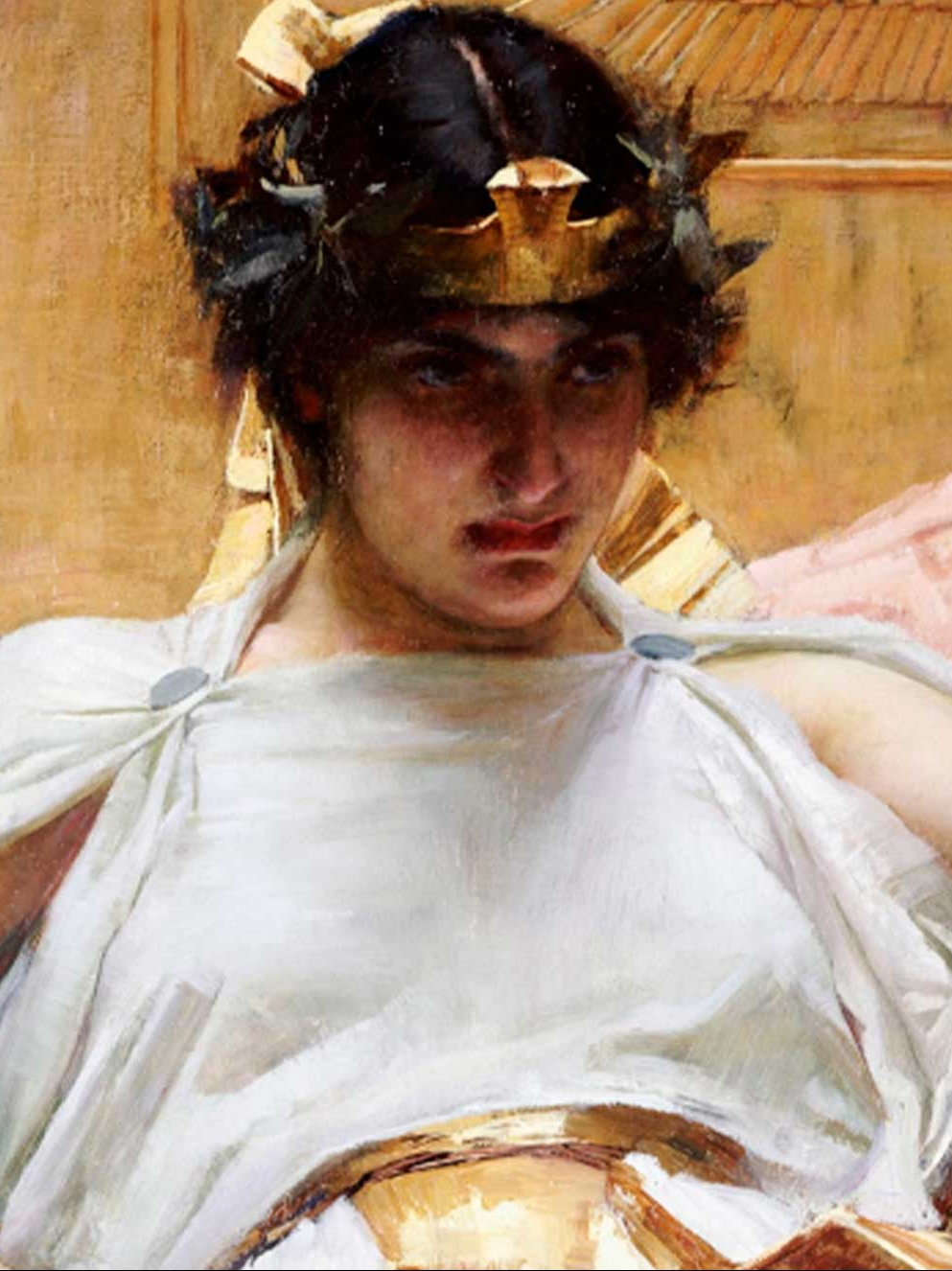
Cleopatra by John William Waterhouse

- deepest brunette: the darkest brown, which can be a very dark chestnut; sometimes appears to be off-black at a distance, and is often considered to be black.

== Genetics ==
Native Americans, East Asian, Southeast Asian, Far East Russian, South Asian, Central Asian and Himalayan black-haired people have thicker hair due to the derived EDAR gene allele that is linked to thicker and potentially straighter hair in some parts of Asia, and shovel-shaped incisors. The derived EDAR gene arose approximately 30,000 years ago in China. One study shows that Paleo-Indians had both variants of the EDAR gene, the derived G-allele and the ancestral A-allele. When they tested ancient DNA remains found in the Americas of the individuals named USR1, Anzick-1 and Laranjal-6700 the results showed that they carried the ancestral A-allele.

11,000-year-old remains of Cuncaicha and Lauricocha individuals from South America share alleles at the highest rate with present-day Amerindians, indicating that the derived G-allele increased in frequency in parallel with the ancestral A-allele.

One of the most studied genes that produce brown hair is MC1R, which helps the body to produce the melanocortin protein. This protein in turn helps the body's hair follicles to produce the type of melanin called eumelanin. To have black hair, one must have genetically inherited this gene from both of their parents, and brown hair is achieved when it is inherited from one parent. This gene is demographically common, as 90% of the total world population carries this gene. Black hair, along with brown hair, comes to turn grey in old age as the hair follicles can no longer produce the pigmentation, but the cause of this inability has yet to be determined.

== Gallery ==
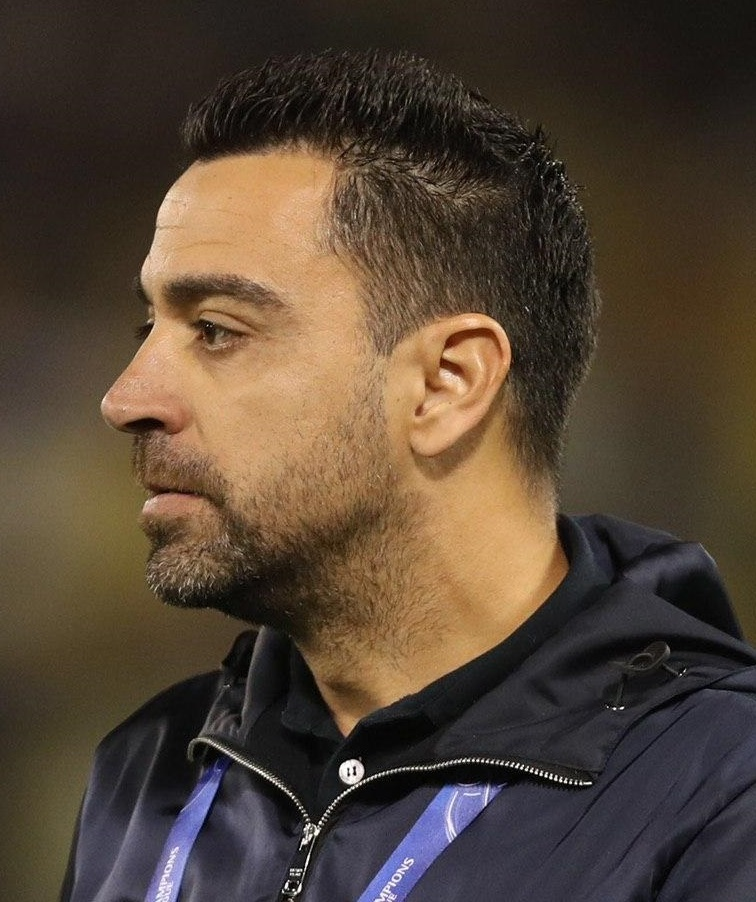
Xavi Hernández, former professional footballer of Catalan origin

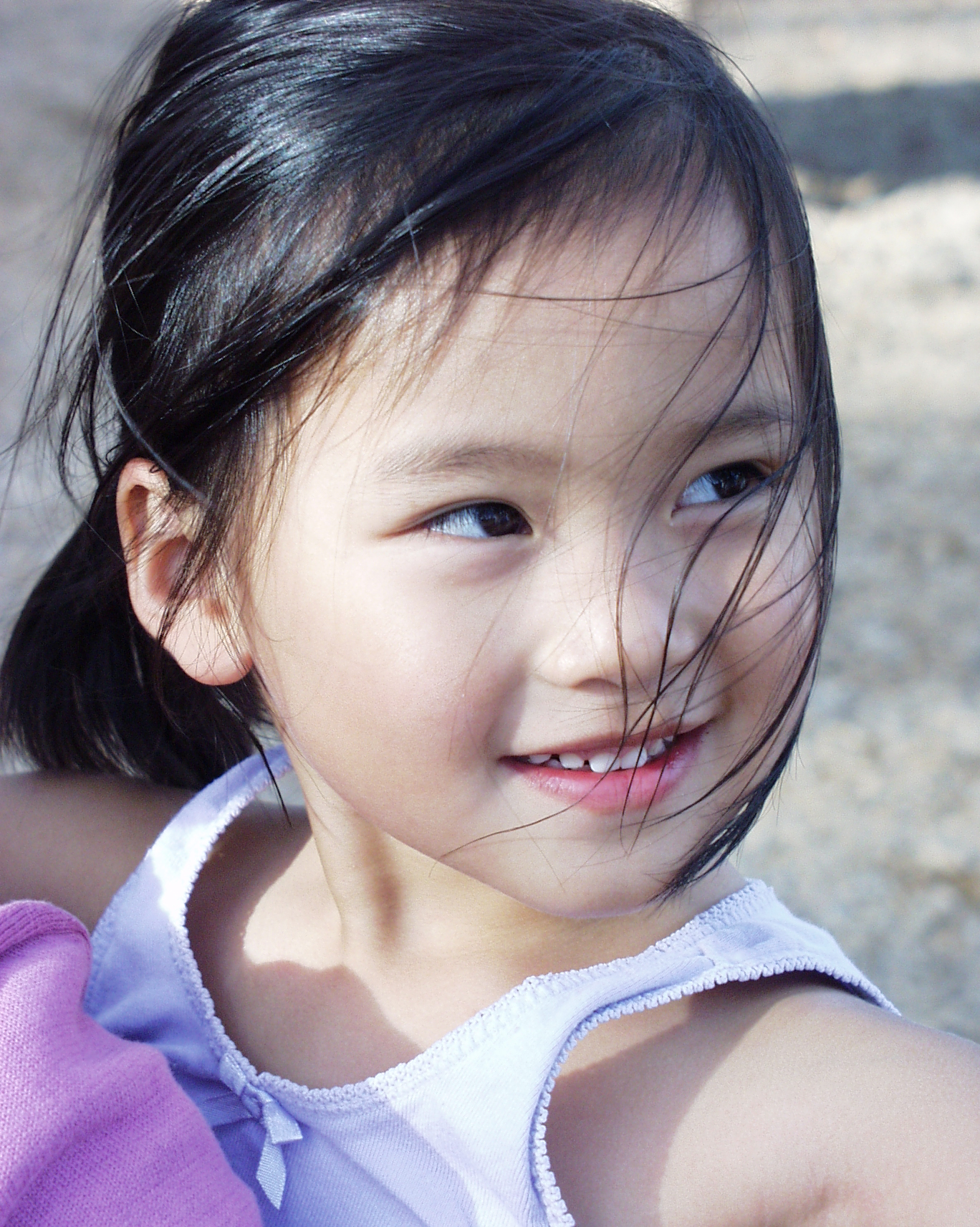
Han Chinese girl with black hair

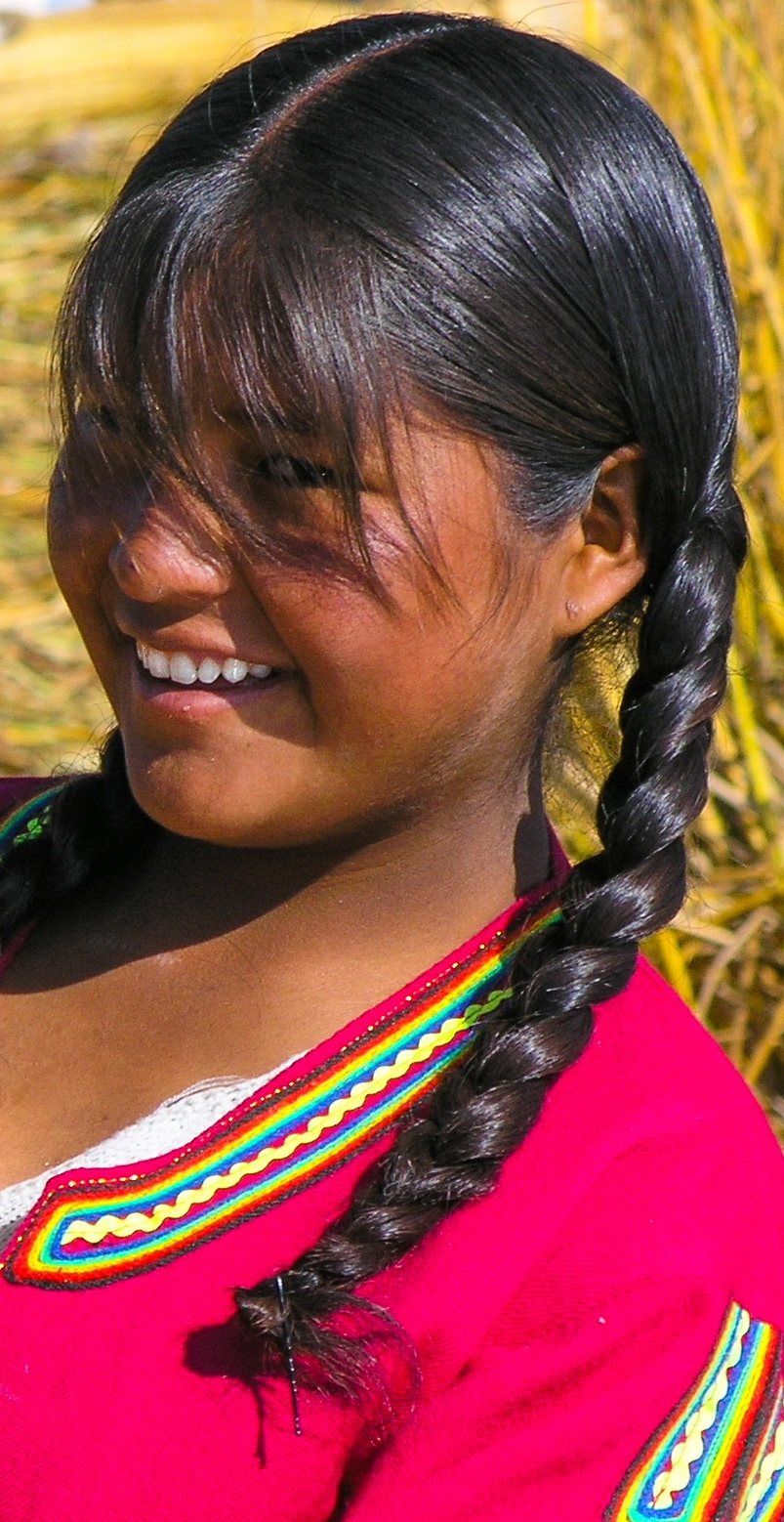
Native American with black hair from South America

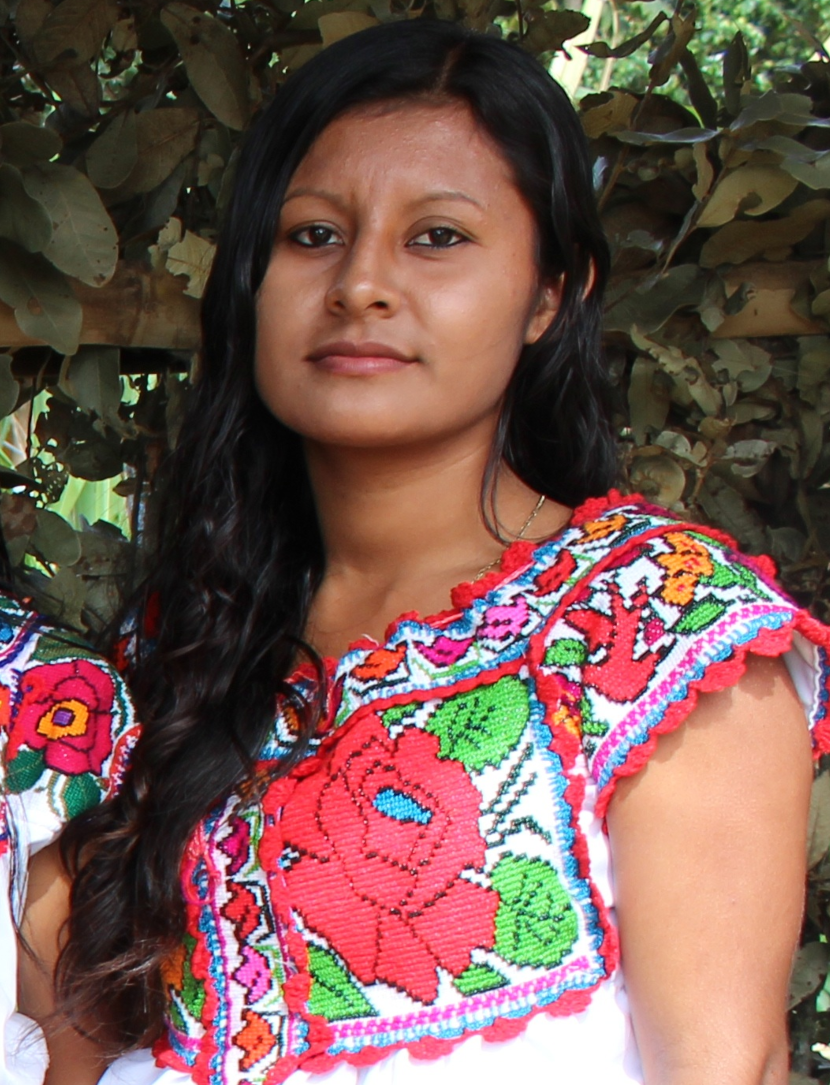
Native American with black hair from North America

Indonesian young woman with black hair from behind

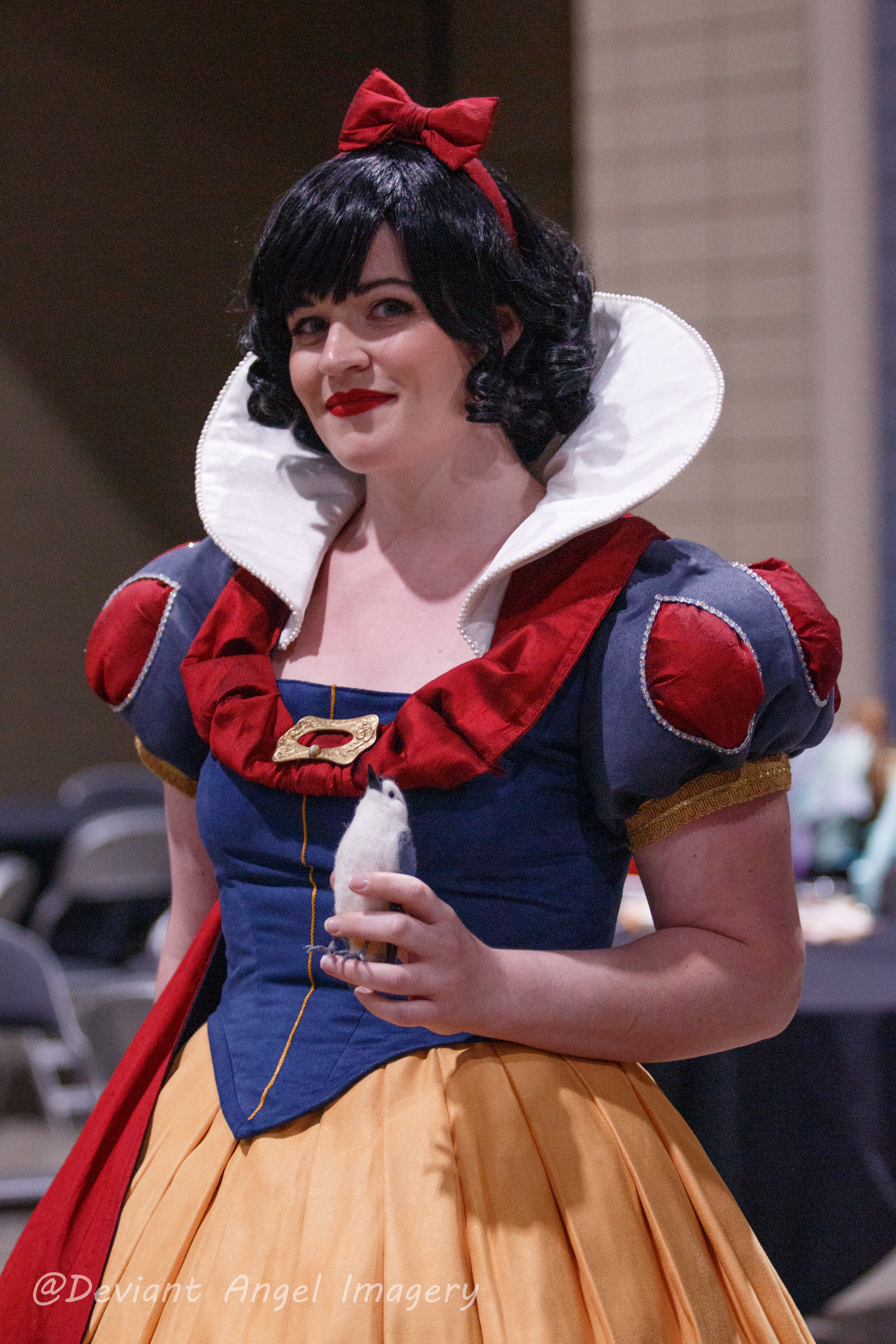
Woman with black hair and light skin cosplaying as Snow White at Disneyland

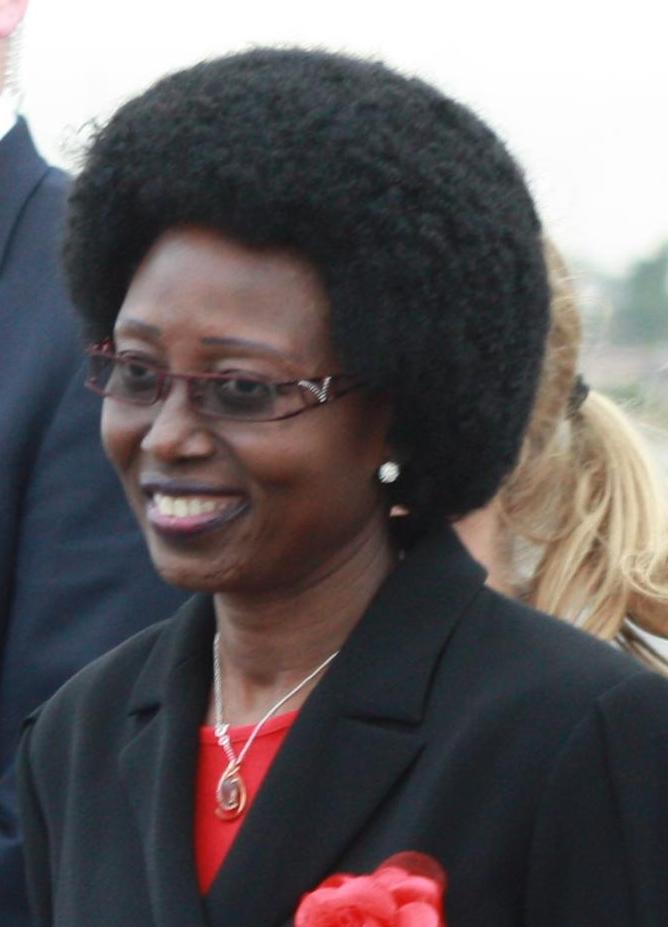
Mariam Boni Diallo, Beninese politician with an Afro hairstyle

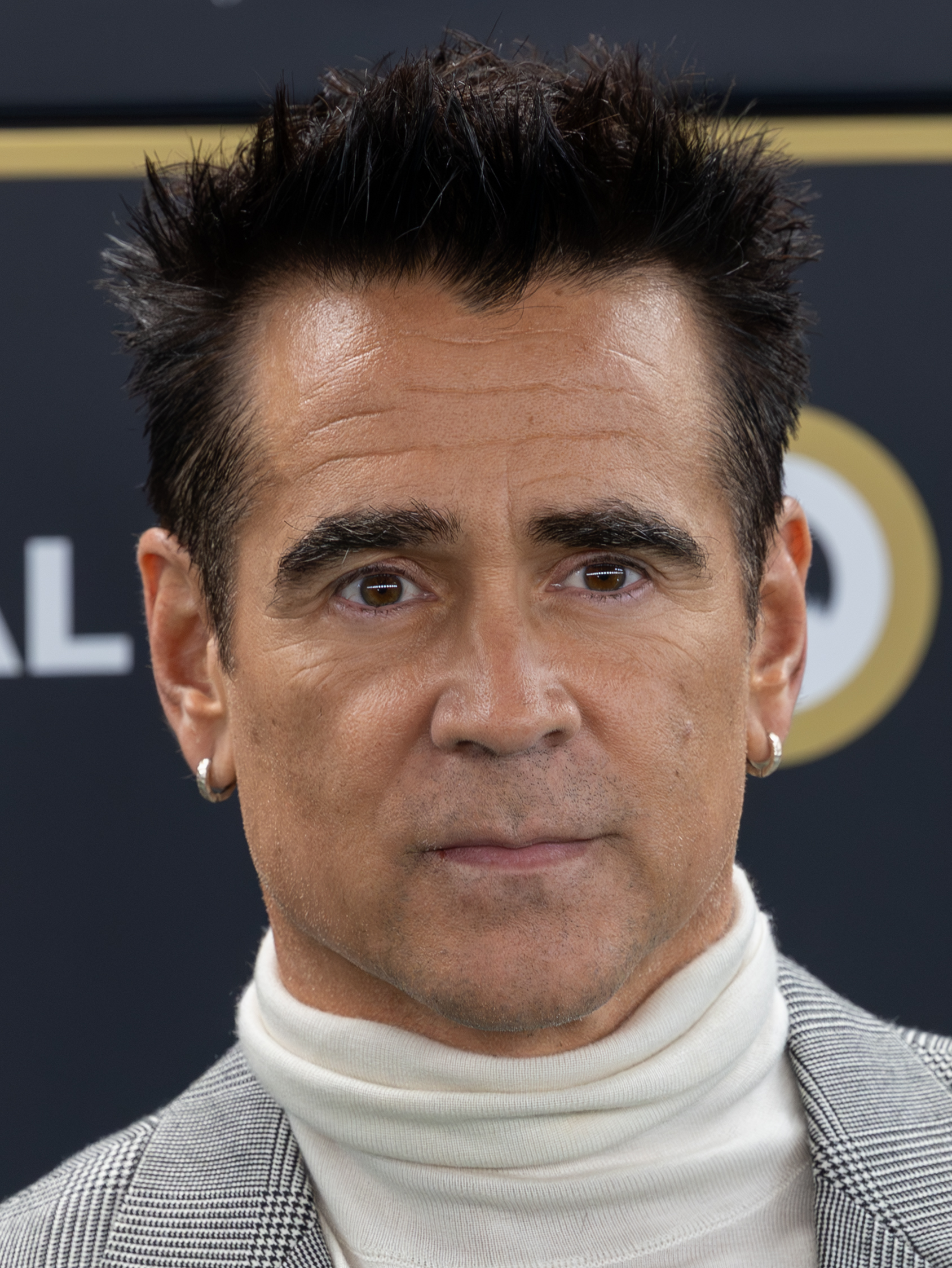
Colin Farrell, actor of Irish origin

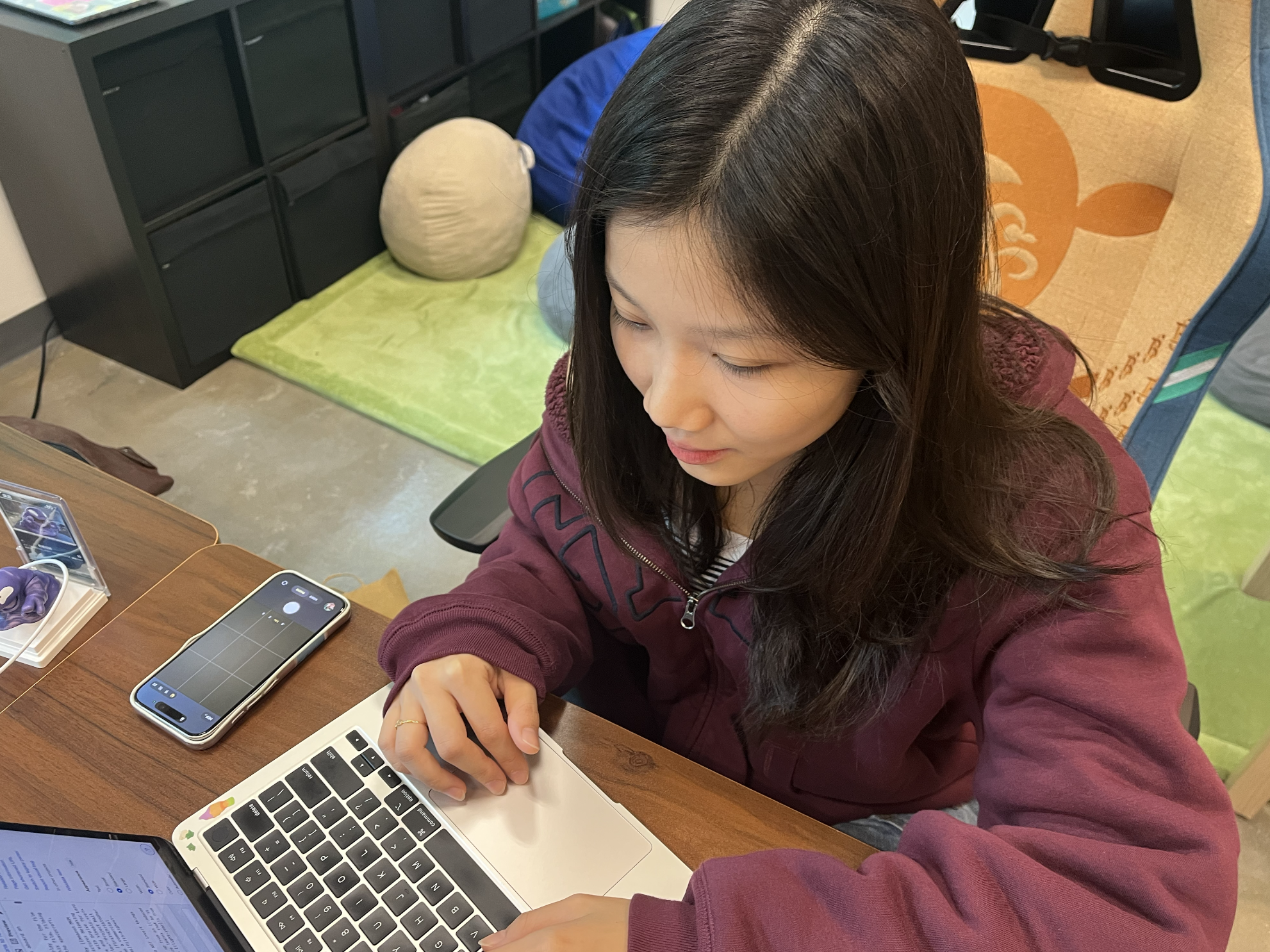
Chinese-Singaporean girl with black hair

== See also ==
- Brown hair
- Hair dye
- Human hair color
- Human skin color
- Melanin
- Pigment
