= Canities subita =

Alleged condition of hair suddenly turning white

Canities subita, also called Marie Antoinette syndrome or Thomas More syndrome, is an alleged condition of hair turning white in a short span due to extreme stress or trauma. The trivial names come from specific cases in history including that of Queen Marie Antoinette of France whose hair was noted as having turned stark white overnight after her capture following the ill-fated flight to Varennes during the French Revolution. An older case of Sir Thomas More's hair turning white the night before his beheading has also been recorded. Although a number of cases of rapid hair greying have been documented, the underlying patho-physiological changes have not been sufficiently studied.

== Causes ==
The syndrome has been hypothesized to be a variant of alopecia areata diffusa or autoimmune non-scarring hair loss that selectively affects all pigmented hairs, leaving only the white hair behind. Canities subita is caused by high levels of emotional stress, which, in turn, causes less pigmentation of the hair. These form the basis of most uses of the idea in fictional works. It has been found that some hairs can become colored again when stress is reduced.

One study with experiments on mice found that stress caused white hair even if the immune system was suppressed (ruling out auto-immune response) and if the glands producing cortisol were removed. The study concluded that over-activation of the sympathetic nervous system was causing stem cells to stop producing pigment cells in hair follicles.

== History ==
According to some versions of the escape of Wu Zixu, he was able to evade execution when his hair miraculously turned white. Zhou Xingsi, the author of the Thousand Character Classic, is also said to have his hair suddenly turn white upon finishing the emperor's task of sorting 1000 characters into his ode.

Another early recorded claim of sudden whitening of the hair is represented in the Talmud in the story of a Jewish scholar, Eleazar ben Azariah, who developed sudden white hair at age 18, ostensibly from his vigorous studying. A contemporary case of accelerated hair-whitening has been documented in the medical journal Archives of Dermatology in 2009.

During the Holocaust and Porajmos, the phenomenon was noted by several other sufferers in the camps as well as by the SS guards. Dina Pronicheva, a survivor of Babi Yar, testified before a court that she saw several people’s hair turn white.

== See also ==
- Greying of hair
- Premature greying of hair
