= Premature greying of hair =

Hair greying happening at a premature age

Premature greying of hair is the process of greying of hair occurring at an unusually early age. It can have negative effects on self-confidence, self-esteem, and social acceptance of the affected individual. Hair is said to have greyed prematurely if it occurs before the age of 20 years in Europeans, before 25 years in Asians, and before 30 years in Africans.

== Cause ==
The cause of greying is not fully understood. It is a complex multi-factorial process mainly considered to be an interplay of nutritional, genetic and environmental factors.

Stress causing over-activation of the sympathetic nervous system increases noradrenaline release in hair follicles. This overproduction causes depletion of the melanocyte stem cells which are required to produce melanin, the pigment responsible for hair color.

Premature greying of hair has been observed with greater frequency among certain families, suggesting a familial predisposition for the condition. As hair pigmentation is a result of complex interaction between various genetic factors, it is thought that premature greying could be due to exhaustion of melanocyte's capability to produce hair pigmentation. Premature canities may occur alone as an autosomal dominant condition or in association with various autoimmune or premature aging syndromes. Down syndrome (trisomy 21) is characterized by features of accelerated aging including premature greying of hair and deficient DNA repair. Premature greying needs to be differentiated from various genetic hypomelanotic hair disorders.

Smoking is another factor that is considered to be related to premature greying of hair. Smoking results in generation of huge amount of reactive oxygen species leading to increased oxidative stress culminating into damage to melanin producing cells, melanocytes. Prolonged exposure to ultraviolet rays is considered to initiate similar processes in hair follicles resulting in premature greying of hair.

Another cause may be caused by usage of drugs or smoking.

=== Malnutrition ===
Nutritional deficiencies:

- Vitamin B12 deficiency
- Folate deficiency
- Iron deficiency
- Copper deficiency
- Hypocalcemia
- Chronic protein loss and low serum ferritin

== Management ==
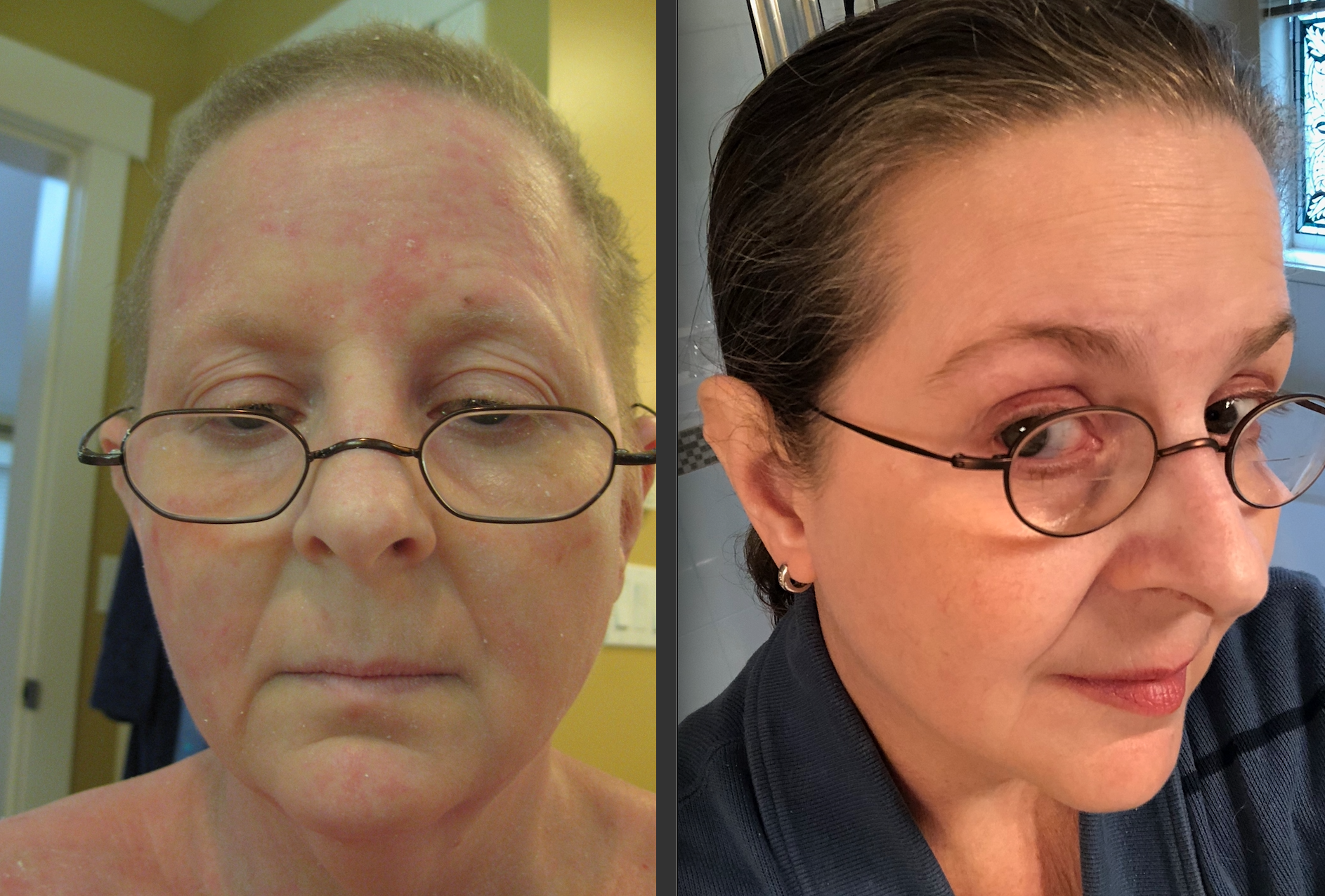
Melanocyte depletion from illness reversed with photobiomodulation

If the cause is due to melanocyte stem cell interruption during the growth cycles due to stress or illness then the use of photobiomodulation for cellular rejuvenation may reverse the process.

Topical anti-aging compounds that are currently under investigation include photo protectors, such as cinnamidopropyltrimonium chloride and solid lipid nanoparticles as carriers for UV blockers, oral supplementation with l-cystine and l-methionine, and topical melatonin.

== Prevalence ==
Reported prevalences were found to range from 5% to 33% in different populations. However, some studies found a higher prevalence at 47% in a Thai university, and 42.5% in a Saudi Arabian university.

== See also ==
- Human hair color
