= Greying of hair =

Natural process of hair turning grey or white with age

- Other names: Greying, canities, achromotrichia
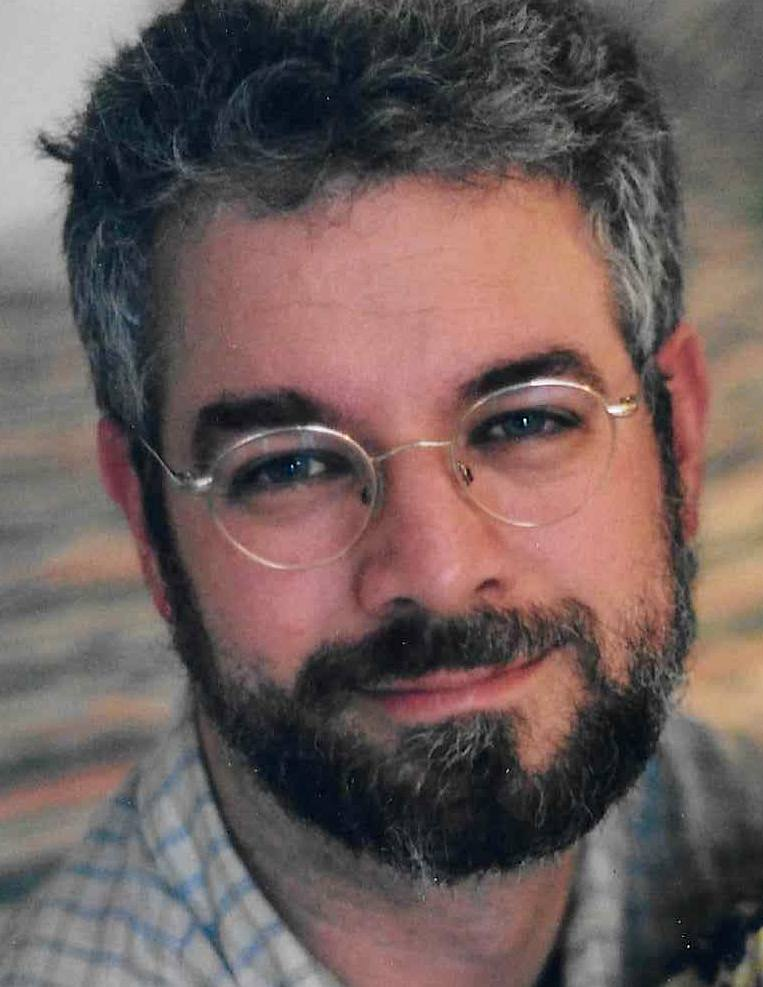
- A 41-year-old man with partially grey hair
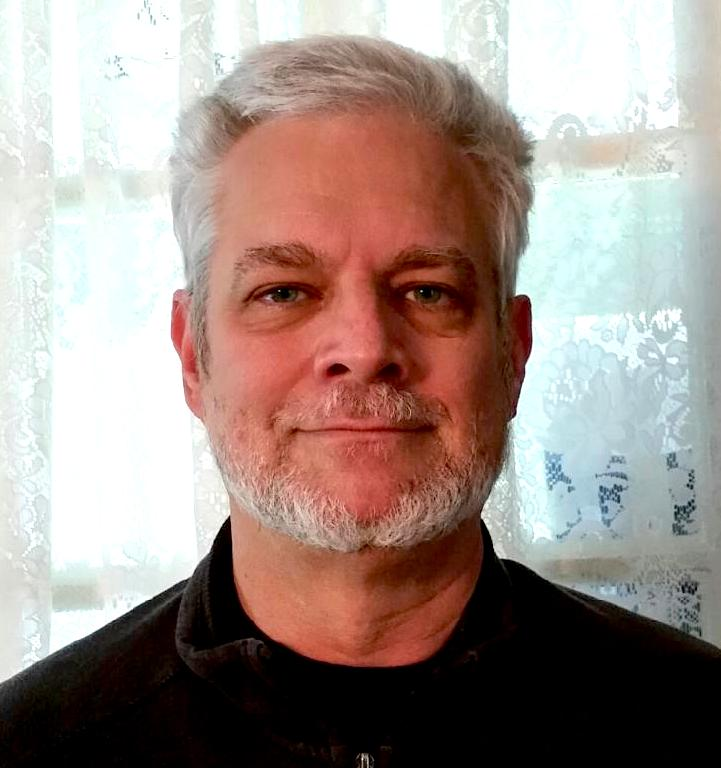
- The same man at age 56, with fully grey hair
- Symptoms: Loss of pigmentation in the hair
- Complications: Psychological distress
- Causes: Ageing, medical conditions, environmental factors
- Treatment: Accepting the condition, dyes, medications

Greying of hair, also known as greying, canities, or achromotrichia, is the progressive loss of pigmentation in the hair, eventually turning the hair grey or white which typically occurs naturally as people age.

== Terminology ==
Greying of hair is the partial or complete process of a hair becoming grey or white. It is also known as canities or achromotrichia. The word "canities" is derived from the Latin word cānitiēs for "grey hair, old age".

== Overview ==
Changes in hair colour typically occur naturally as people age, eventually turning the hair grey and then white. This normally begins in the early to mid-twenties in men and late twenties in women. More than 60 percent of Americans have some grey hair by age 40. The age at which greying begins seems almost entirely due to genetics. Sometimes people are born with grey hair because they inherit the trait.

The order in which greying happens is usually: nose hair, hair on the head, beard, body hair, eyebrows.

Greying is a gradual process; according to a study by L'Oreal, overall, of those between 45 and 65 years old, 74% had some grey hair, covering an average of 27% of their head, and approximately 1 in 10 people had no grey hairs even after the age of 60.

== Causes ==
Grey or white hair is not caused by a true grey or white pigment, but is due to a lack of pigmentation and melanin. The clear hairs appear as grey or white because of the way light is reflected from the hairs.

The change in hair colour occurs when melanin ceases to be produced in the hair root and new hairs grow in without pigment. The stem cells at the base of hair follicles produce melanocytes, the cells that produce and store pigment in hair and skin. The death of the melanocyte stem cells causes the onset of greying. It remains unclear why the stem cells of one hair follicle may fail to activate well over a decade before those in adjacent follicles less than a millimeter apart.

In non-balding individuals, hair may grow faster once it turns grey. Unlike in the skin where pigment production is continuous, melanogenesis in the hair is closely associated with stages of the hair cycle. Melanin production pauses during the catagen phase as a follicle detaches old hair to prepare a new hair. Hair partially greys when melanin production stops late in the anagen cycle while hair is still growing, and fully gray hair begins when new melanin does not begin production again during the next anagen phase. Thus, hair typically begins to grey at the roots, but new hair may grow fully grey while most hair is still normally pigmented.

Several genes appear to be responsible for the process of greying. Bcl2 and Bcl-w were the first two discovered, then in 2016, the IRF4 (interferon regulatory factor 4) gene was announced after a study of 6,000 people living in five Latin American countries. However, it found that environmental factors controlled about 70% of cases of hair greying.

Greying of hair may be triggered by the accumulation of hydrogen peroxide and abnormally low levels of the enzyme catalase, which breaks down hydrogen peroxide and relieves oxidative stress in patients with vitiligo. Since vitiligo can cause eyelashes to turn white, the same process is believed to be involved in hair on the head (and elsewhere) due to aging.

In some cases, grey hair segments due to stress, chemicals, or a nutrient deficiency may reverse when the issue resolves.

=== Stress ===
Anecdotes report that stress, both chronic and acute, may induce achromotrichia earlier in individuals than it otherwise would have. There is some evidence for chronic stress causing premature achromotrichia, but no definite link has been established. It is known that the stress hormone cortisol accumulates in human hair over time, but whether this has any effect on hair color has not yet been resolved. A 2020 paper, published in the journal Nature reported that stress can cause hair to lose its pigment. An overactive immune response can destroy melanocytes and melanocyte stem cells in black-haired rats. When intentionally subjecting them to panic, they bleached their coat. The next time the rats' coat grew, there were no melanocyte stem cells in these damaged follicles, so white hairs sprouted, and the color loss was permanent.

=== UV damage ===
Excessive exposure to the sun is the most common cause of structural damage of the hair shaft. Photochemical hair damage encompasses hair protein degradation and loss, as well as hair pigment deterioration. Photobleaching is common among people with European ancestry. Around 72 percent of customers who agreed to be involved in a study and have European ancestry reported in a recent 23andMe research that the sun lightens their hair. The company also have identified 48 genetic markers that may influence hair photobleaching.

=== Medical conditions ===
In some cases, grey hair may be caused by thyroid deficiencies, Waardenburg syndrome or a vitamin B_{12} deficiency. At some point in the human life cycle, cells that are located in the base of the hair's follicles slow, and eventually stop producing pigment. Piebaldism is a rare autosomal dominant disorder of melanocyte development, which may cause a congenital white forelock.

Albinism is a genetic abnormality in which little or no pigment is found in human hair, eyes, and skin. The hair is often white or pale blond. However, it can be red, darker blond, light brown, or rarely, even dark brown.

Vitiligo is a patchy loss of hair and skin color that may occur as the result of an auto-immune disease. In a preliminary 2013 study, researchers treated the buildup of hydrogen peroxide which causes this with a light-activated pseudo-catalase. This produced significant media coverage that further investigation may someday lead to a general non-dye treatment for grey hair.

Malnutrition is also known to cause hair to become lighter, thinner, and more brittle. Dark hair may turn reddish or blondish due to the decreased production of melanin. The condition is reversible with proper nutrition.

Werner syndrome and pernicious anemia can also cause premature greying.

=== Artificial factors ===
A 1996 British Medical Journal study found that tobacco smoking was correlated with premature greying. Smokers were found to be four times more likely to begin greying prematurely, compared to nonsmokers.

Grey hair may temporarily darken after inflammatory processes, after electron-beam-induced alopecia, and after some chemotherapy regimens. Much remains to be learned about the physiology of human greying.

There are no special diets, nutritional supplements, vitamins, or proteins that have been proven to slow, stop, or in any way affect the greying process, although many have been marketed over the years. However, French scientists treating leukemia patients with imatinib, a drug used in treating cancer, noted an unexpected side effect: some of the patients' hair color was restored to their pre-grey color.

=== Changes after death ===
The hair color of buried bodies can change. Hair contains a mixture of black-brown eumelanin and red-yellow pheomelanin. Eumelanin is less chemically stable than pheomelanin and breaks down faster when oxidized. The color of hair changes faster under extreme conditions. It changes more slowly under dry oxidizing conditions (such as in burials in sand or in ice) than under wet reducing conditions (such as burials in wood or plaster coffins).

== Management ==
Many people take no particular steps to alter their greying hair, accepting it as a normal part of ageing, and allow it to go grey naturally. Some people choose to disguise greying hair through the use of hair dye. Still others allow their hair to go grey while using various products to achieve what they perceive as a more aesthetic grey effect.

The anti-cancer drug imatinib has been shown to reverse the greying process. However, it is expensive and has potentially severe side effects such as fluid retention, gastrointestinal bleeding, bone marrow suppression, liver problems, and heart failure, so it is not practical to use to alter a person's hair color. Nevertheless, if the mechanism of action of imatinib on melanocyte stem cells can be discovered, it is possible that a safer and less expensive substitute drug might someday be developed. It is not yet known whether imatinib has an effect on catalase, or if its reversal of the greying process is due to something else.

== See also ==
- Premature greying of hair
- Canities subita (alleged sudden greying of hair)
