= Les Gladiatrices: Blondes vs. Brunes =

2004 film

- Produced by: Nikita Productions
- Starring: Moundir Zoughari; David Golis; Marlene Duval; Alexandra Coulet
- Edited by: Sylvain Piot
- Music by: Julian Dagorno
- Distributed by: Warner Vision (France)
- Release date: 2004
- Running time: 100 minutes
- Country: France
- Language: French

Les Gladiatrices: Blondes vs. Brunes is a 2004 DVD based in a French reality TV show that featured women wrestling each other. The women were divided into two teams, one blonde and the other brunette.

== Summary ==
The video opens with a scene of a circular wrestling mat in a dark warehouse. In the background, ten women approach the camera, walking down a long, dark corridor. The video than cuts to interviews with the two coaches: David Golis who is the blonde coach and Moundir Zoughari who is the brunette coach. Each of the ten women is showcased and interviewed. Prior to wrestling, the women, who are dressed in revealing two piece outfits, are oiled by their coach. Matches are eight minutes long, but complete matches are not shown, instead match highlights are shown of selected matches.

== Reviews ==
Reviewers commented on the attraction of young women, covered in oil and wrestling each other in swimwear, to men.

One day someone came. A guy, probably. In one sentence, he managed to bring the words "Girls", "Fight", "Oil" and "Swimwear". A true genius. Someone replied. A guy, probably. Him, his only contribution was to add the words "TV" and "reality." The gladiators were born. The official concept of wrestling matches made between two groups of girls, the brunettes one side and the other blondes. Each team consists of five beautiful girls from the TV that fight in swimsuit and one to one, on a circular tatami installed in a warehouse. They will be coached by a male, a true, also coming from the TV. The informal concept (the most obvious): Girls with big breasts, oiled head to toe by the male in question will roll over in hugging and uttering little cries of pain. A fantasy come true, and on TV. When I spoke of genius ...

User reviews on the amazon.fr website ridicule the movie as a lowering of French cultural standards and humiliating to women. One of the reviewers described the production as "…shocking, useless, stupid and … the boundary between human and animal." Another reviewer noted that the brunette team easily defeated the blondes because the brunettes wanted to win and the blondes wanted to have a good time.

== See also ==
- Blonde versus brunette rivalry
- Blondes vs. Brunettes
- Blondes vs. Brunettes (charity event)
- Catfight
