= Blondes vs. Brunettes =

- ABC-TV Promotional Advertisement
- Genre: Variety
- Written by: Rod Warren, George Beckerman, David Scott Jones, Bus Cohan, Lisa Medway
- Directed by: Steve Binder, Sterling Johnson
- Starring: Joan Collins; Morgan Fairchild; Brooke Shields; Rita Moreno; Bruce Boxleitner; Phyllis Diller
- Theme music composer: Fred Thaler
- Country of origin: United States
- Original language: English

Production
- Producers: Claude Ravier, Steve Binder
- Running time: 60 minutes
- Production company: ABC-TV

Original release
- Network: ABC
- Release: May 14, 1984

Blondes vs. Brunettes was an ABC TV special that was broadcast on May 14, 1984. The one-hour variety show, co-hosted by Joan Collins and Morgan Fairchild, was a humorous look at the personality and lifestyle differences between blonde and brunette women. Time magazine characterized the special as a "showdown" between Collins, "…TV’s brunette meanie and Morgan Fairchild, 34, a blond TV vixen." At the time of the release, Collins was starring in the popular nighttime soap opera Dynasty where she played a dark haired foil to the blonde Linda Evans.

Despite the imagery of a confrontation, the special gently poked fun at popular culture's blonde vs. brunette rivalry and attempted to "dispel the myths about blondes and brunettes." The show featured a number of skits including a "Dynasty" skit where Fairchild and Collins played the roles of the show's blonde and brunette rivals. The final skit featured Collins and Fairchild in their elderly years offering a toast to each other. The lengthy guest cast included Brooke Shields and Bruce Boxleitner.

The special was widely criticized and mocked for its absurd premise, with The Des Moines Register writing, "Do blondes really have more fun? Are blonde men more gentle than dark haired men? Which do you notice first, blondes or brunettes? Does ABC have any class? You can find out the answers to these and other inane questions on this special ... 'experts' on the subject include Dr. Joyce Brothers, and Father Guido Sarducci."

== See also ==
- Blonde versus brunette rivalry
- Les Gladiatrices: Blondes vs. Brunes
