= Brown hair =

Human hair color

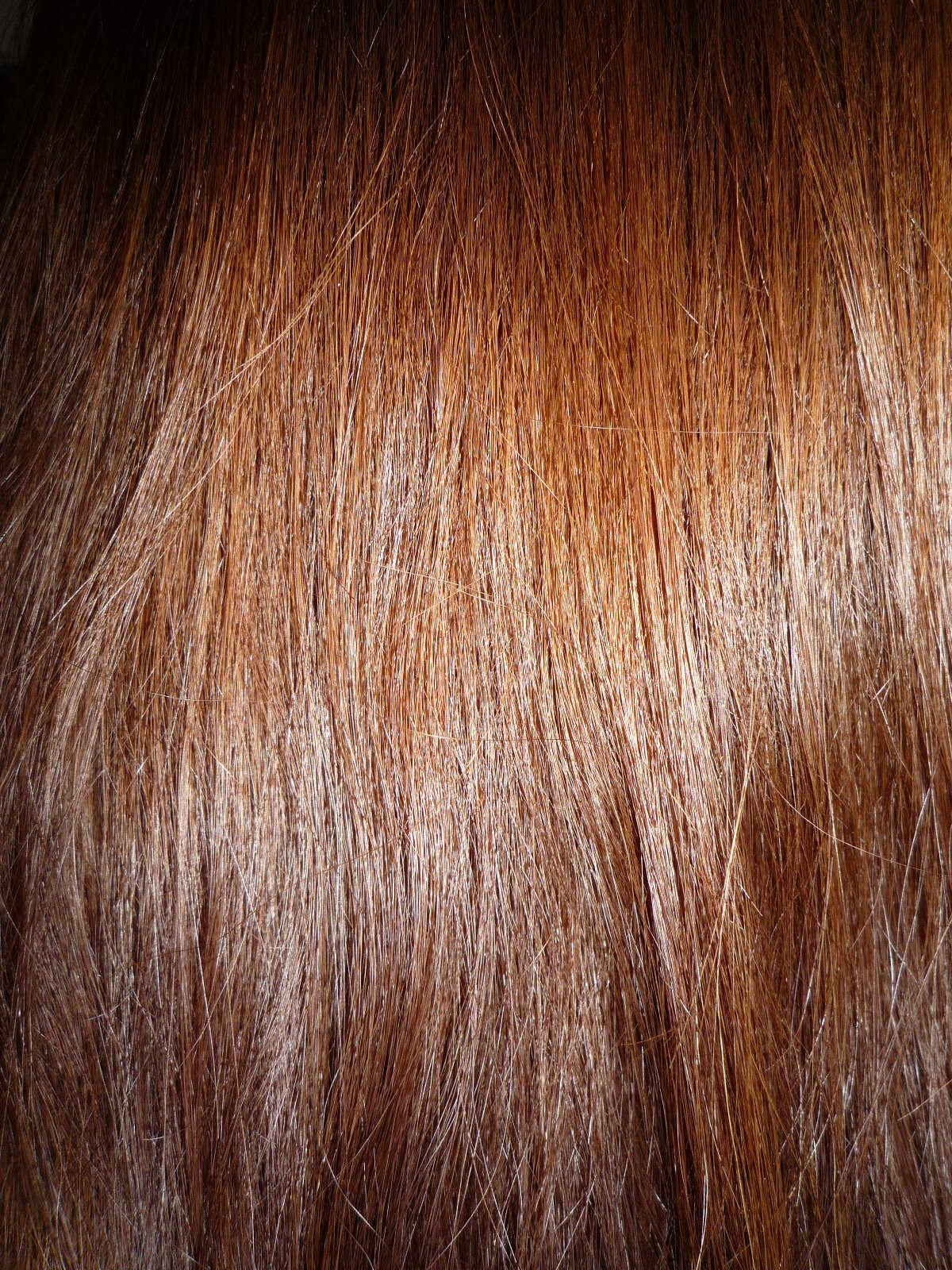
A close-up view of brown hair

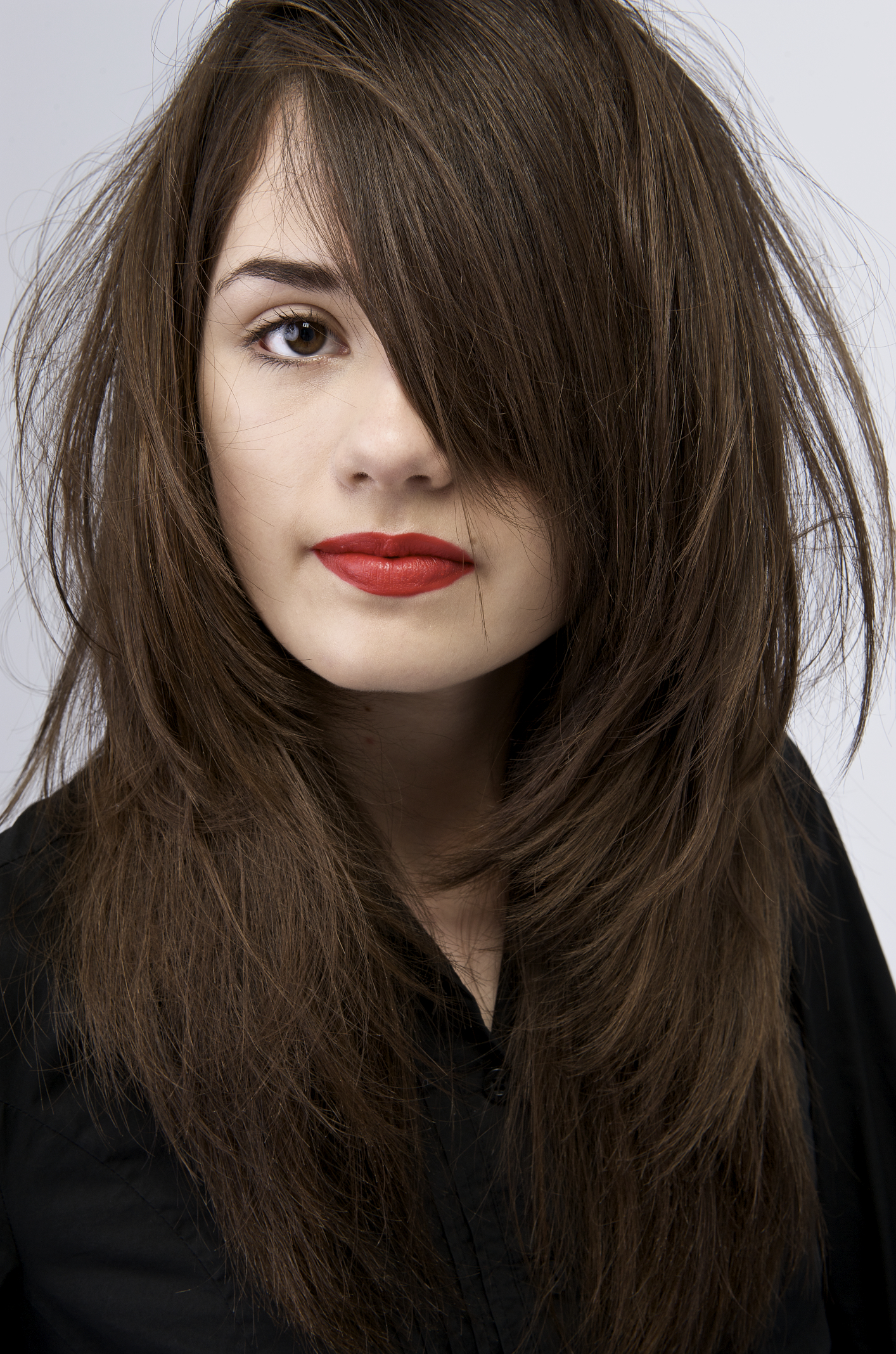
Woman with brown hair

Brown hair, also referred to as brunette (when female), is the second-most common human hair color, after black hair. It varies from light to dark brown. It is characterized by moderate levels of the dark pigment eumelanin and low levels of the pale pigment pheomelanin.

Brown hair is common among populations in the Western world, especially among those from Northwestern Europe and the United States, as well as populations in Central Europe, Southeastern Europe, Eastern Europe, Southern Europe, Southern Cone, Brazil, Colombia, Costa Rica, Puerto Rico, and also some populations in the Middle East, Central Asia, Afghanistan and South Asia where it transitions smoothly into black hair. Additionally, brown hair is common among Australian Aboriginals, East Asians and Melanesians.

== Etymology and grammar ==
The term brunette is the feminine form of the French word brunet, which is a diminutive form of brun meaning "brown/brown-haired", the feminine of which is brune. All of these terms ultimately derive from the Proto-Indo-European root *bhrūn- "brown, grey". The form "brun" (pronounced /bruːn/) is still commonly used in Scotland, particularly in rural areas, and is also the word for "brown" in the Scandinavian languages. In modern English usage, however, it has lost the diminutive meaning and usually refers to any brown-haired girl or woman, or the associated hair color. Merriam-Webster defines "brunet" as "a person having brown hair"—with which they may have "a relatively dark complexion—spelled brunet when used of a boy or man and usually brunette when used of a girl or woman". Although brunet is the masculine version of the popular diminutive form used to describe a little boy or young man with brown hair, the use of "brunet" is uncommon in English. One is more likely to say about a man or boy, "He has brown hair" or "He is brown-haired" than to say, "He is a brunette" (or brunet).

Lighter or darker shades of brown hair may be referred to as "light brunette" or "dark brunette", though in such cases one is generally referring only to the hair color, not using the term as a descriptor for the person; one would be unlikely to say, "She is a light brunette." Rather, one would say, "She has light-brown hair."

== Geographical distribution and ethnic groups ==
=== Europe ===
Brown-haired individuals dominate in most parts of Europe. In northern and central Europe medium to light brown shades are the most common, while darker shades prevail in the rest of the continent. Brown hair, mostly medium to light brown shades, are also dominant in Australia, Canada, South Africa among White South Africans and the United States among European Americans (from Northern, Central and Eastern Europe), British, Irish, Baltic, Dutch/Flemish, German (including Swiss-German and Austrian), Slovenian, Polish, Ukrainian and Russian people, as well as Southern (Italian, Spanish, Greek, Portuguese) and Southeastern Europe (Albanian, Bulgarian, Croatian, Serbian).

In Spain, 57% are brown (7% of Spaniards are naturally blonde, 26% brunette, 3% redhead and the remaining 10% dark and light brown).

Dark brown hair is common throughout Europe.

=== Africa ===
Brown hair is common in North Africa (such as Morocco, Algeria, Tunisia), ranging from light to dark brown, with dark brown being the most prevalent.

=== Oceania ===
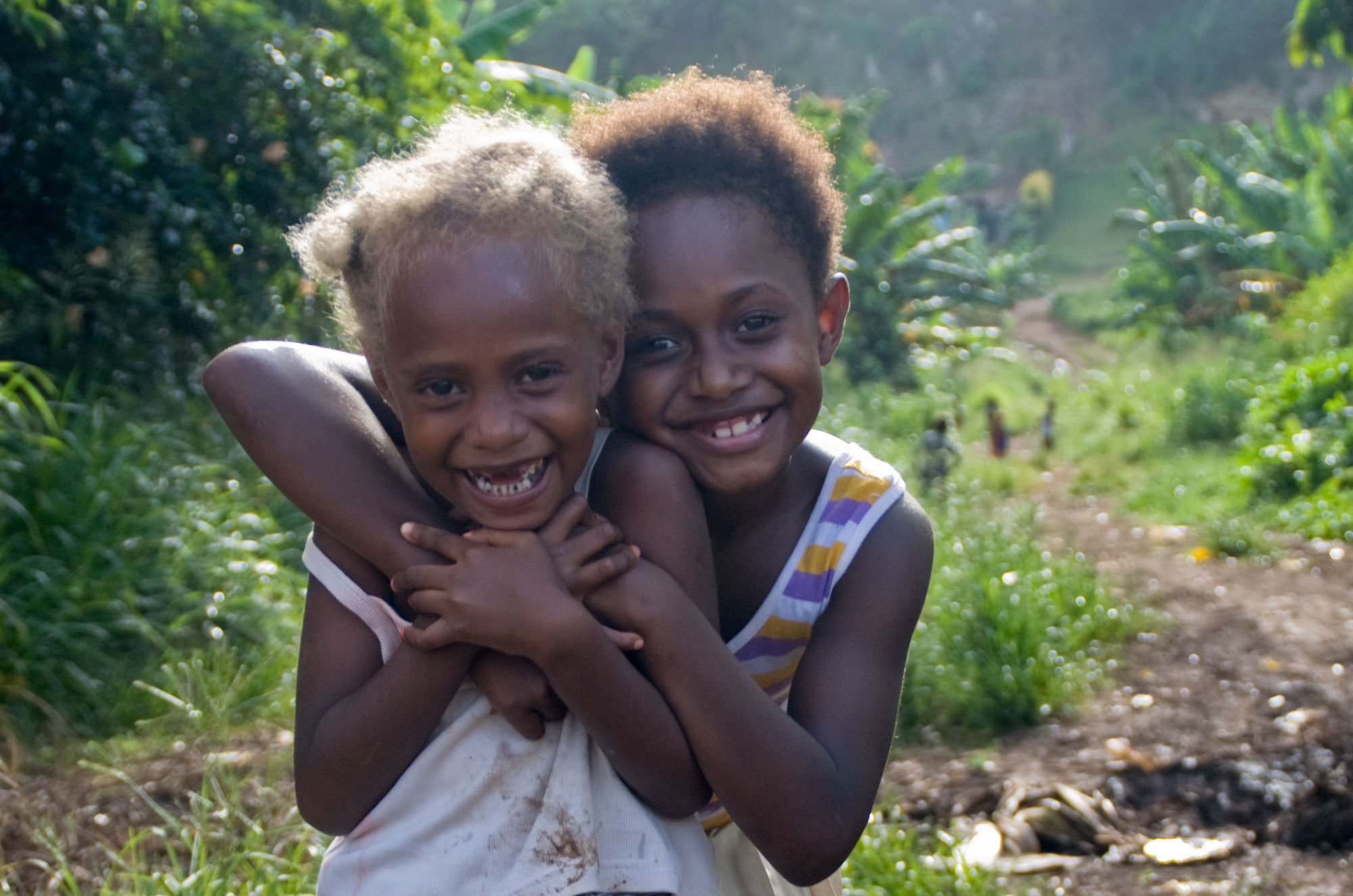
Children from Vanuatu, one with blond hair, one with brown

Similarly to blond hair, brown hair occurs commonly among Australian Aboriginal and Melanesian populations.

=== America ===
Brown hair is also found among people in the Americas, including in the Southern Cone of South America (Chile, Argentina, Uruguay, Paraguay, central-southern Brazil), Colombia, the Andean Region of Venezuela, the Costa Rican Central Valley, and the Puerto Rico.

A study of 1,023 students in Chile found that the most common eye color was brown-black: 71 to 89.4% and the most common hair color was brown from 65.8% to 66.8%.

=== Asia ===
==== Middle East ====
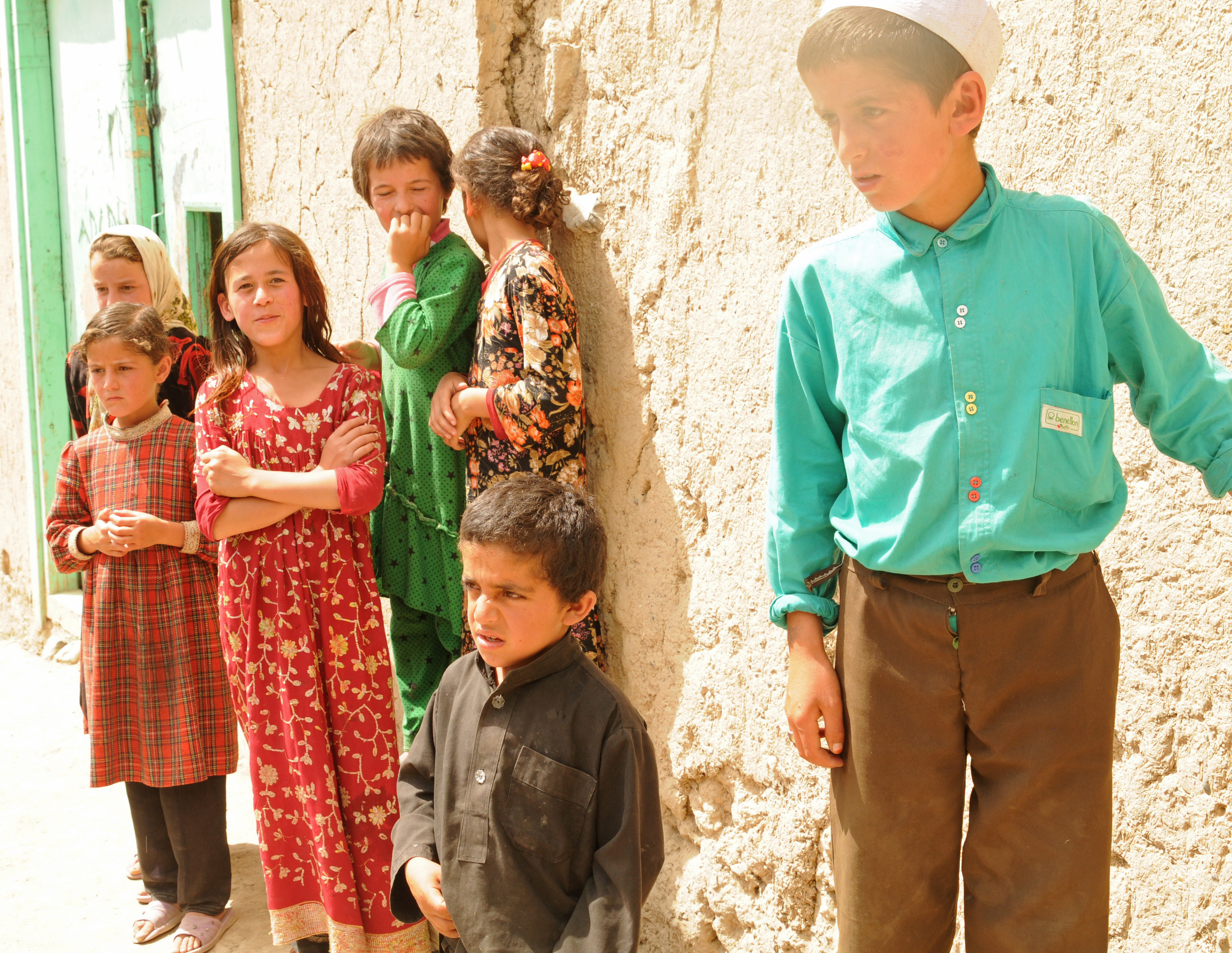
Afghan children with brown hair

Brown hair in the Middle East is typically medium to dark brown, though light brown can also be seen.

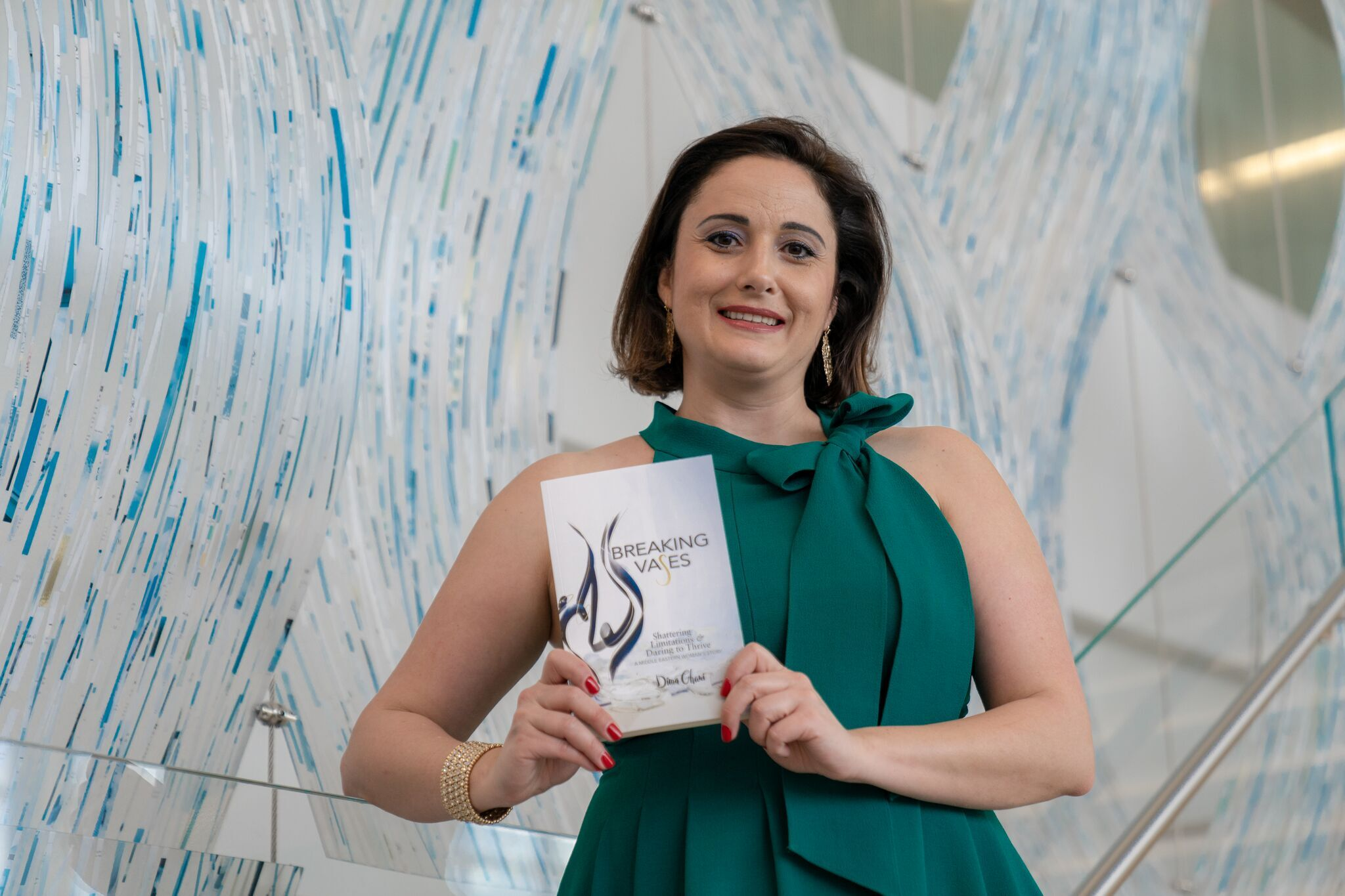
Dima Ghawi's dark brown hair

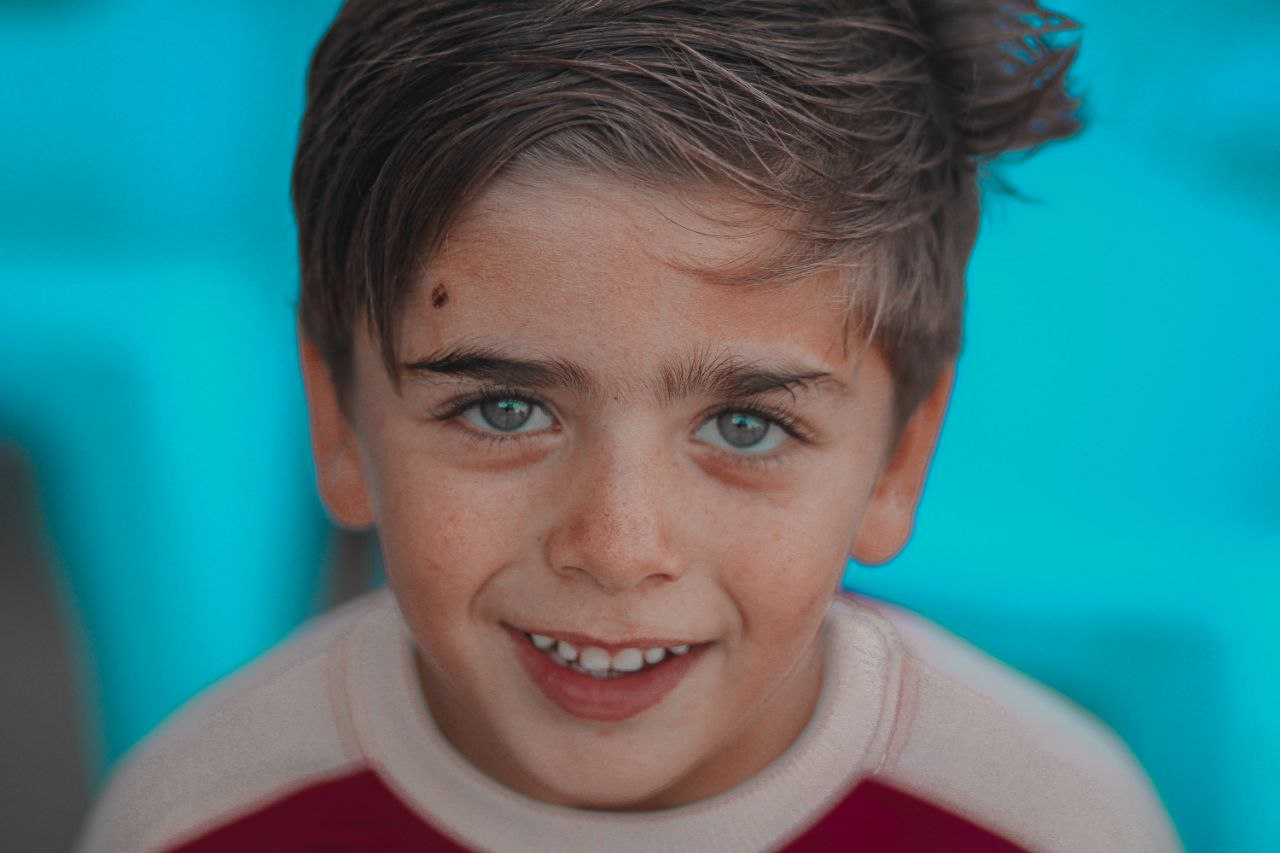
Brown-haired Middle Eastern boy

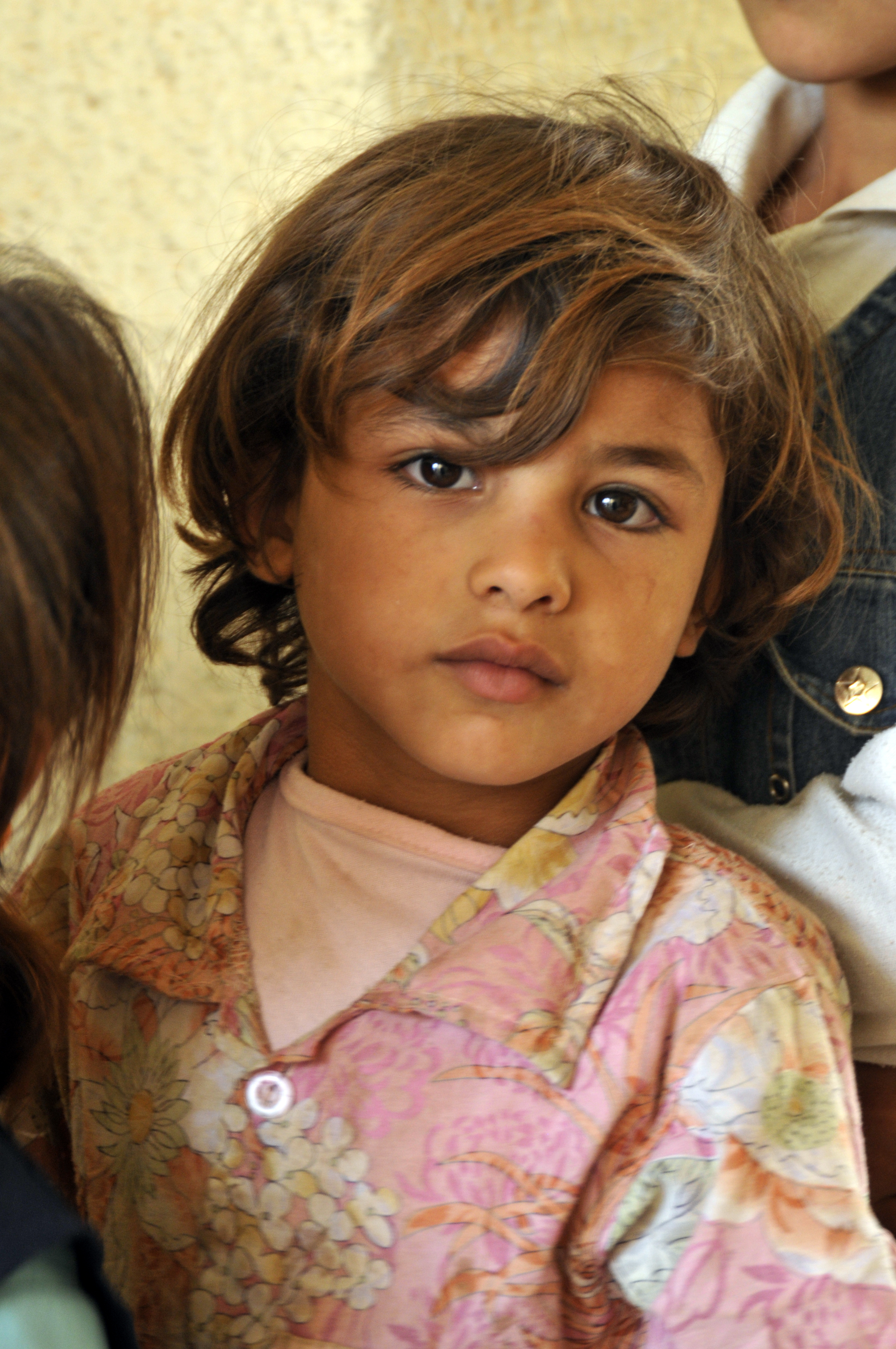
Iraqi boy

==== Central Asia ====
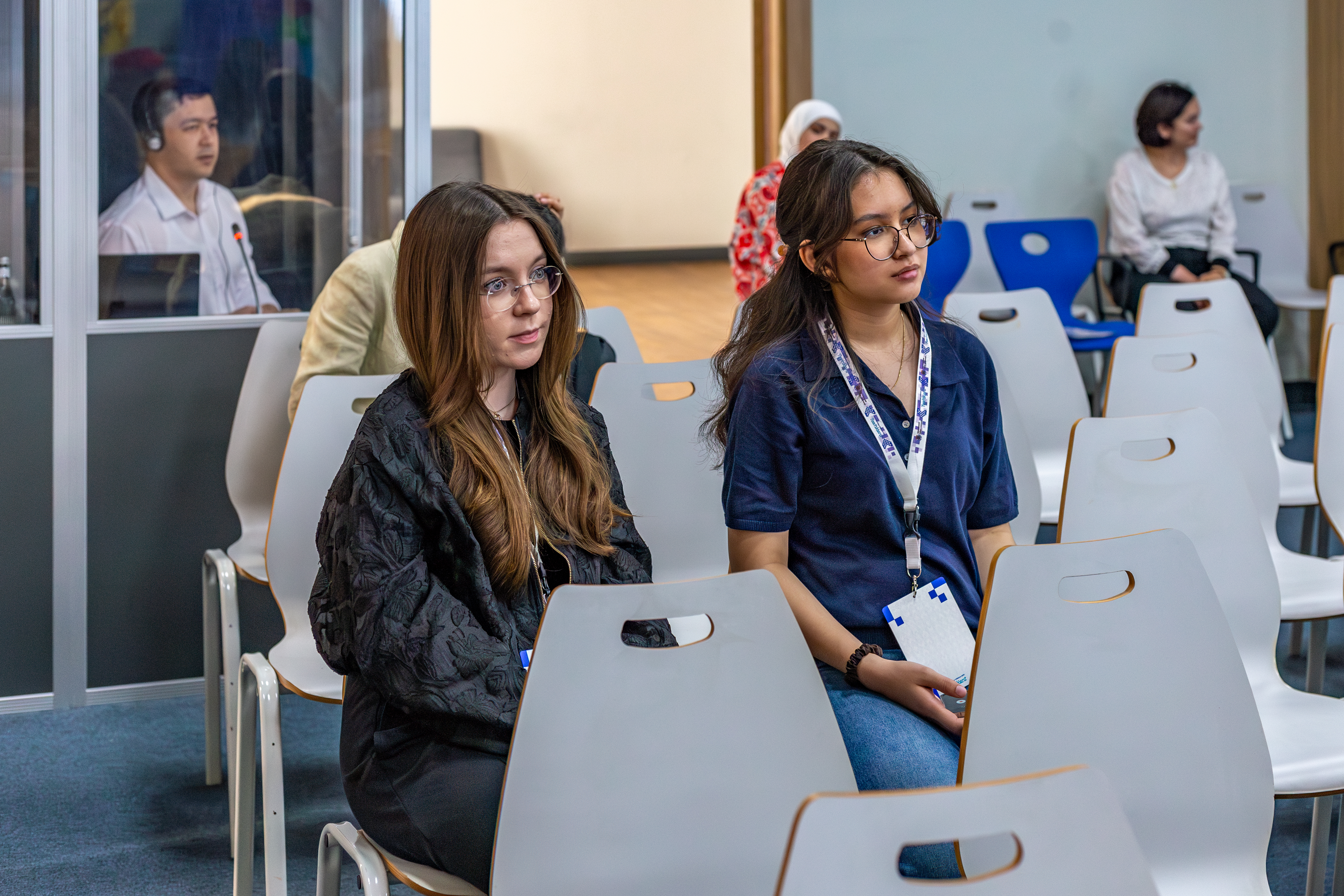
Two Central Asian women with brown hair

Brown hair is also found in Central Asia, typically medium to dark brown.

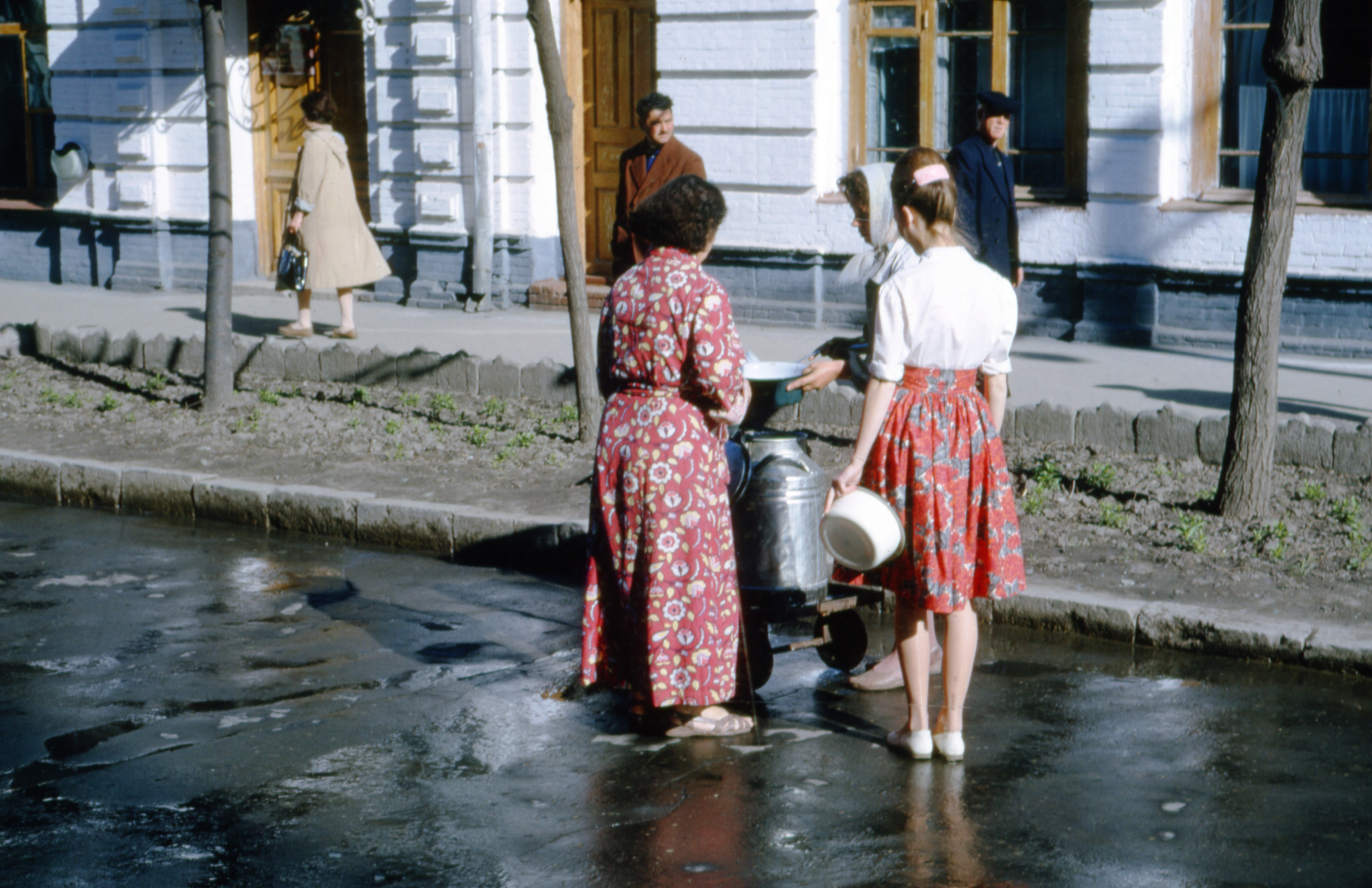
Brown-haired Central Asian women

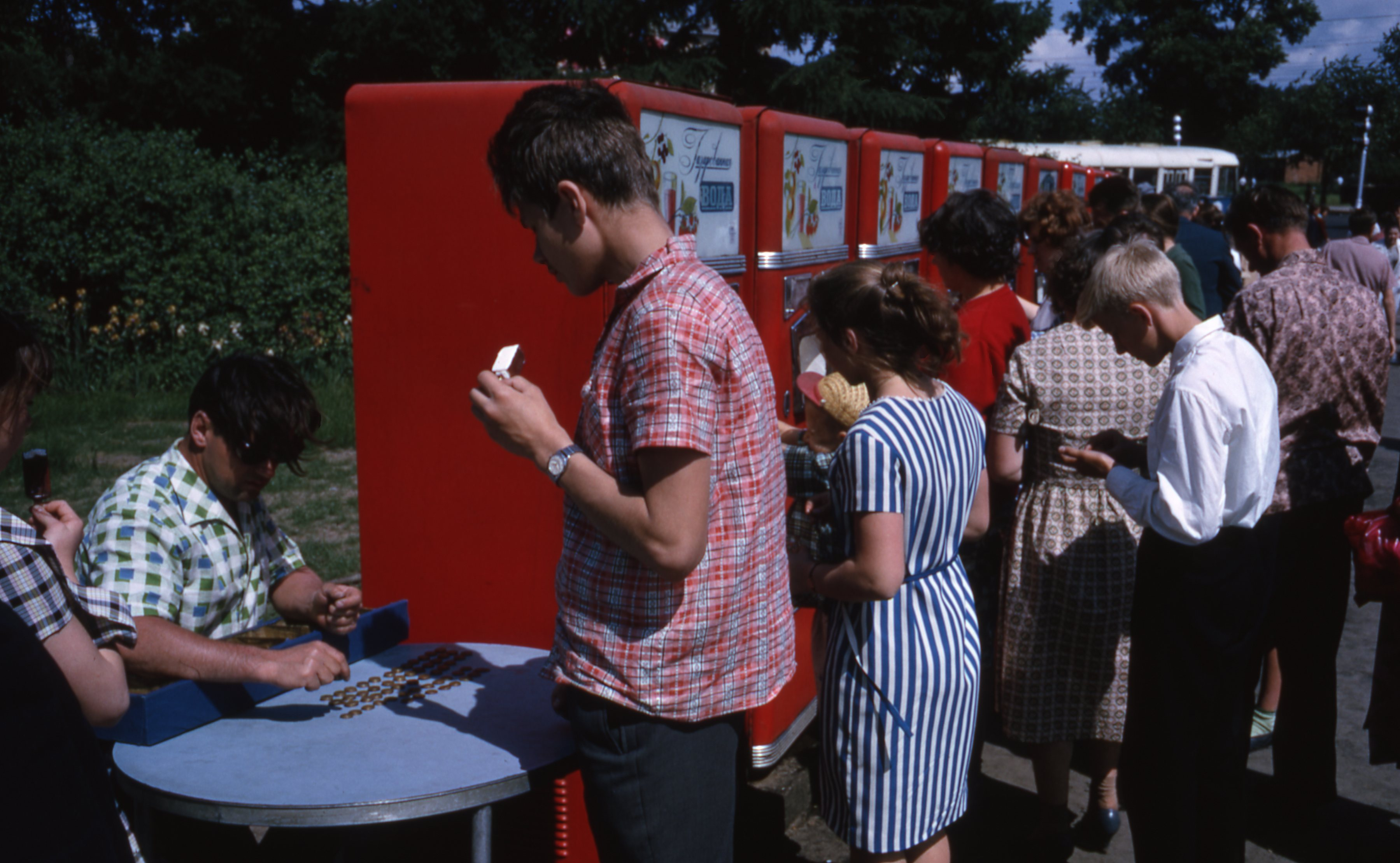
Central Asian people

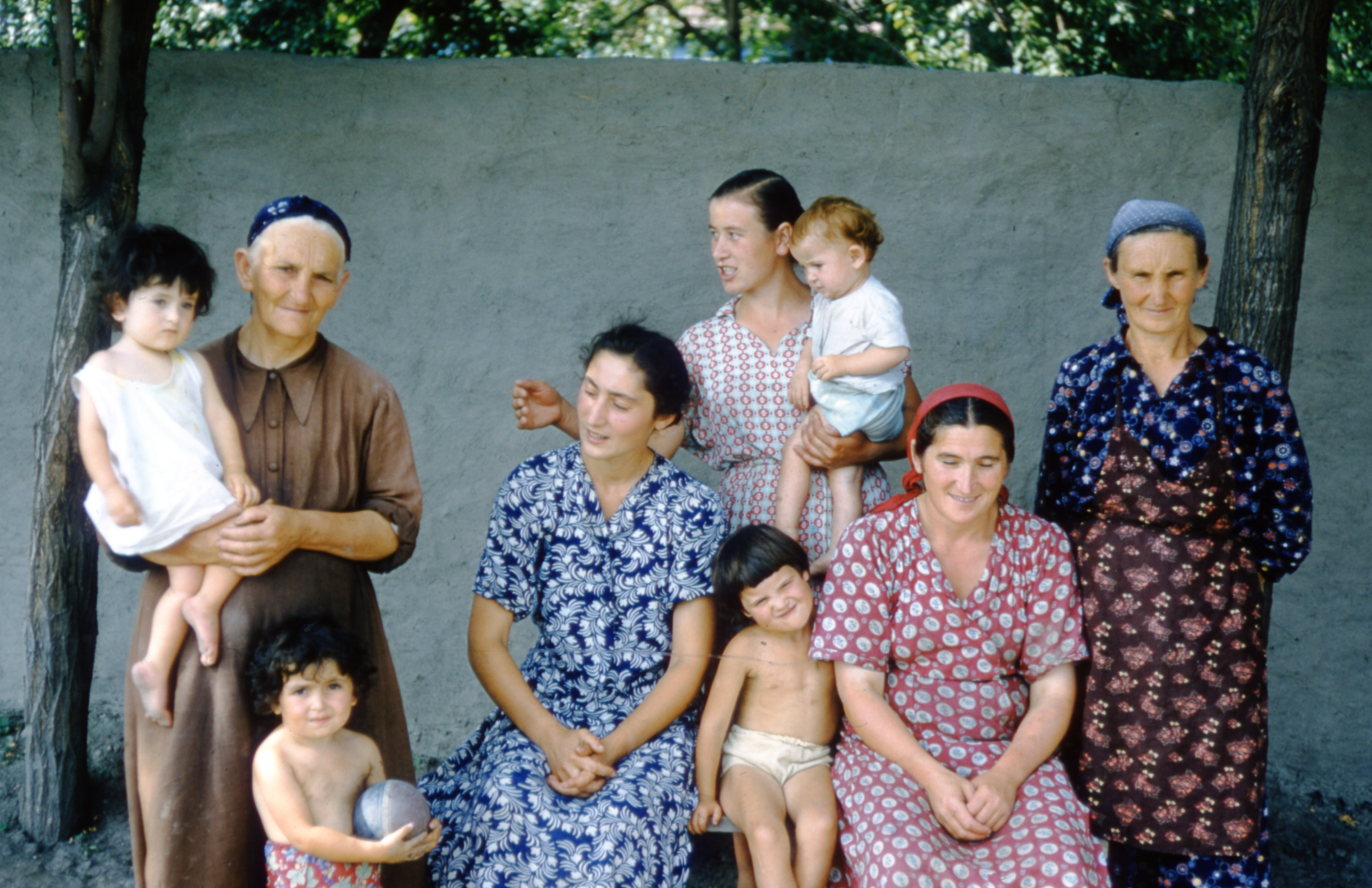
Brown-haired Central Asian toddler being held

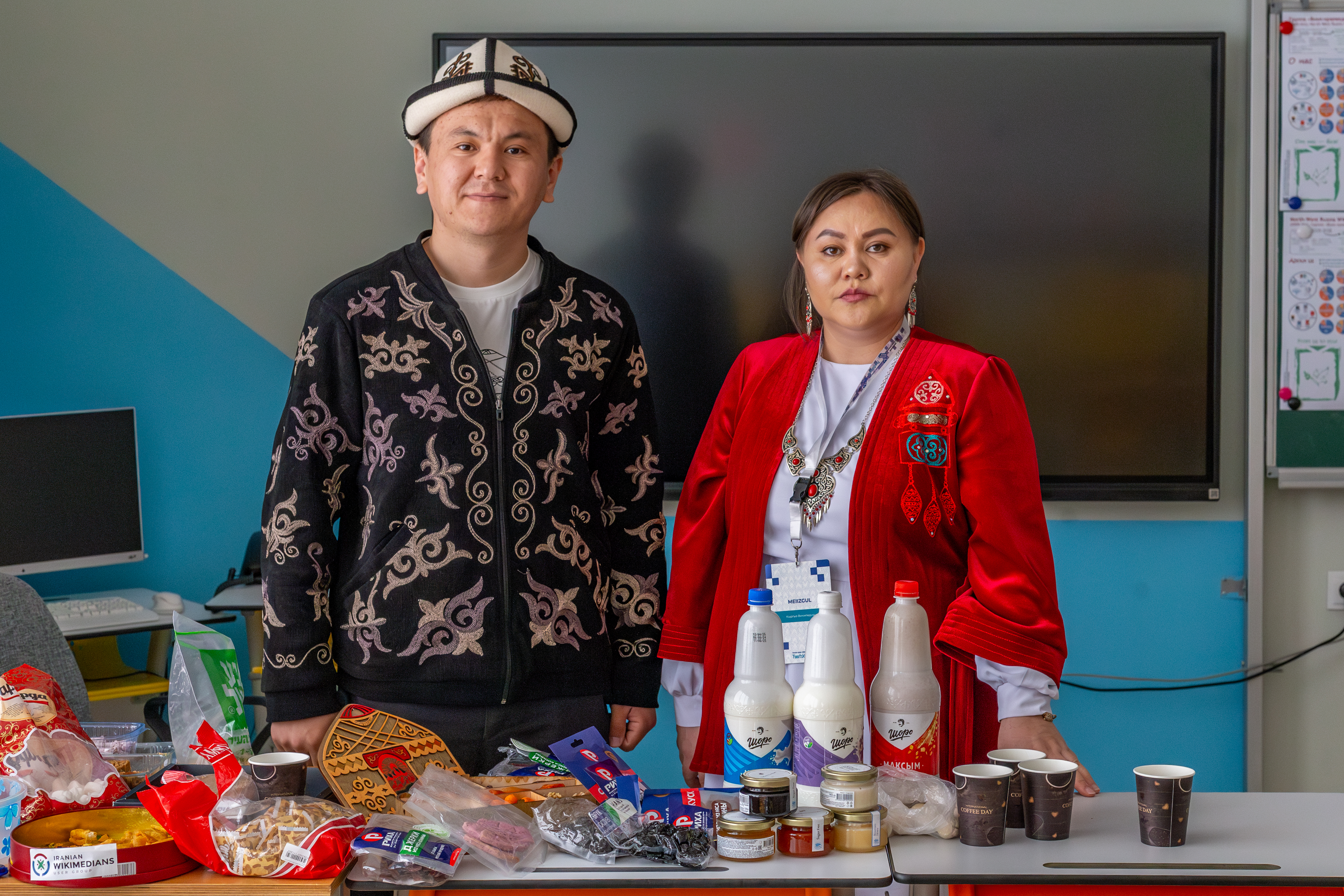
Brown-haired Central Asian women

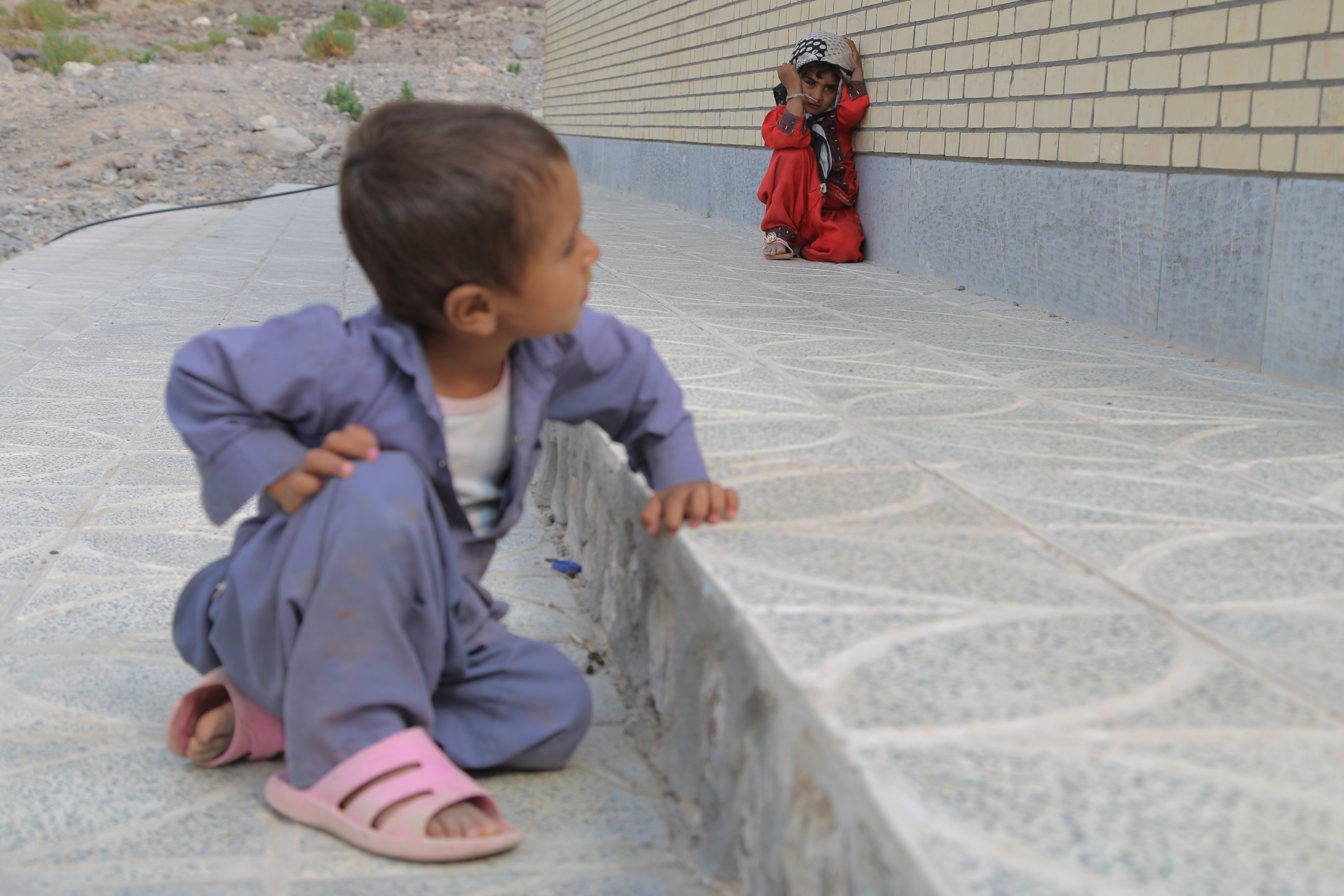
Brown-haired Central Asian boy

==== East Asia ====
Chinese historical portraits

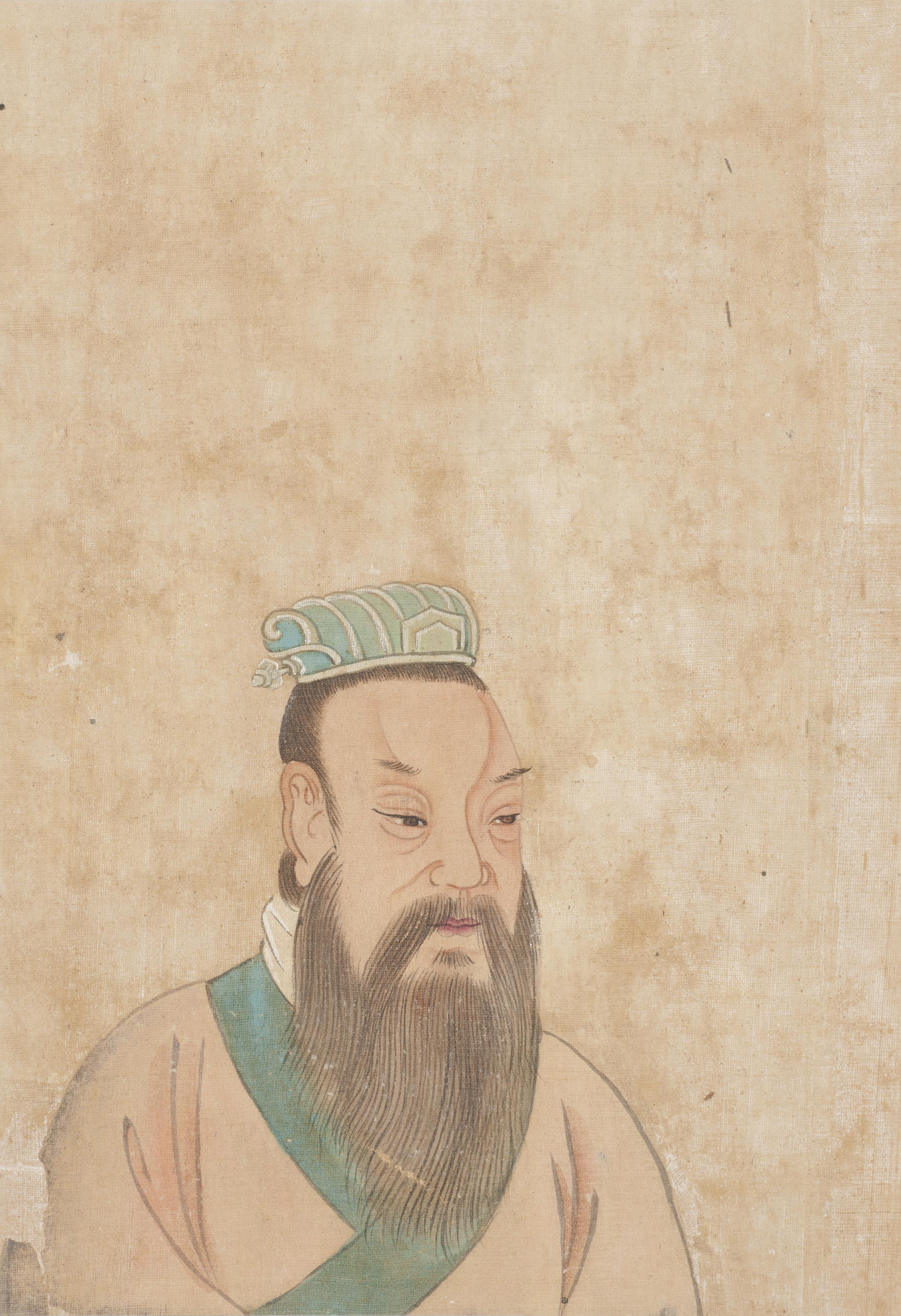
Brown hair

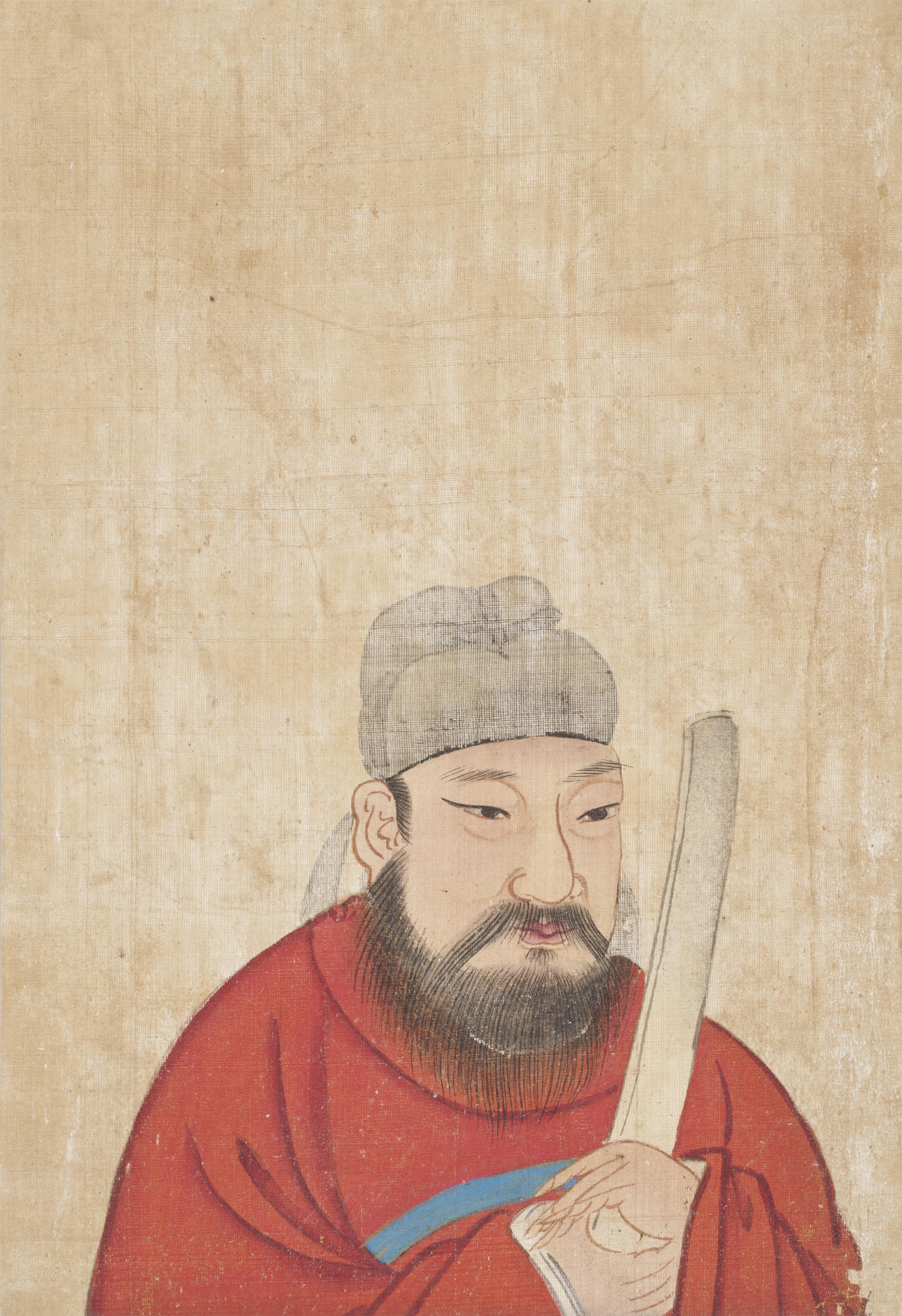
Black hair

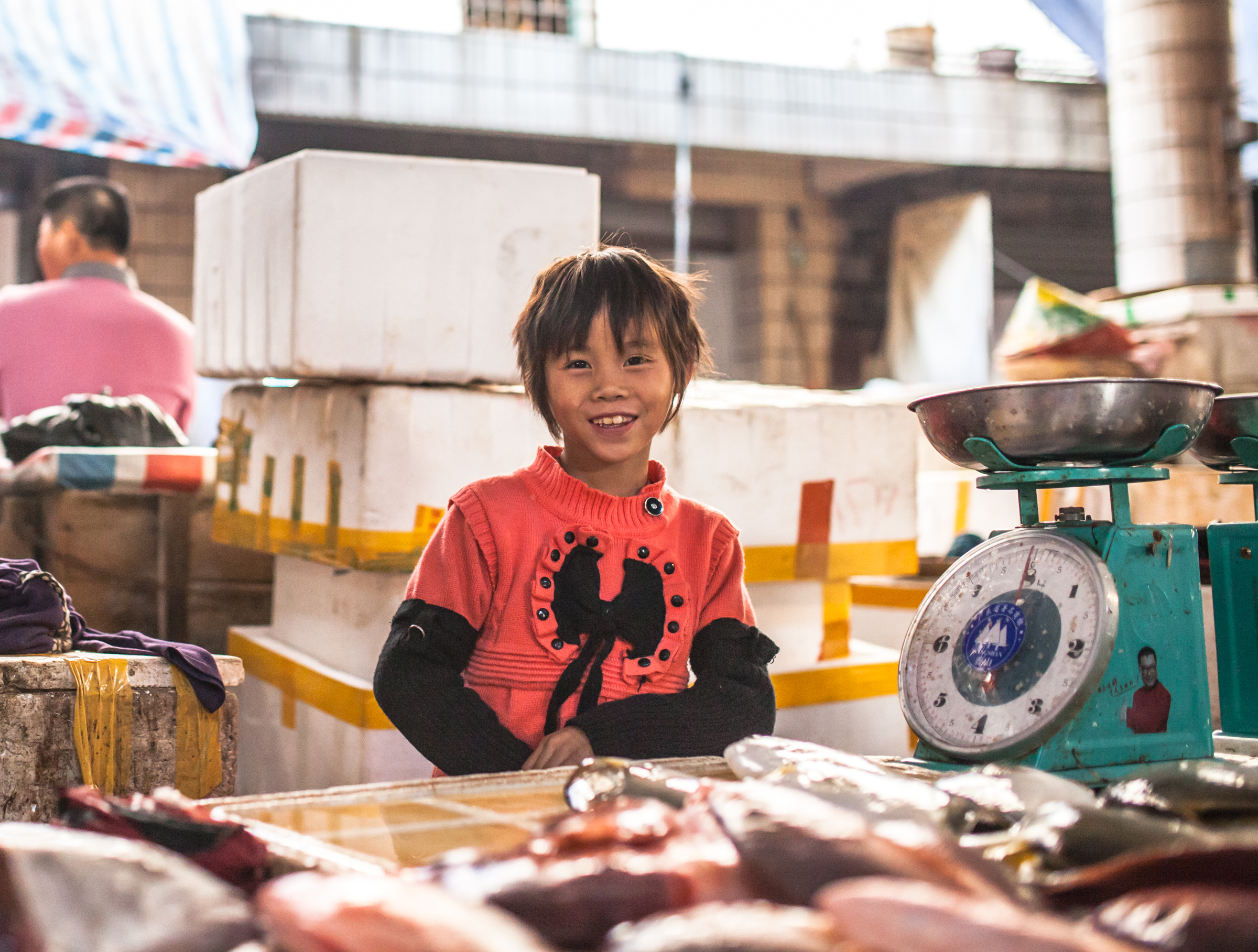
Chinese girl with brown hair

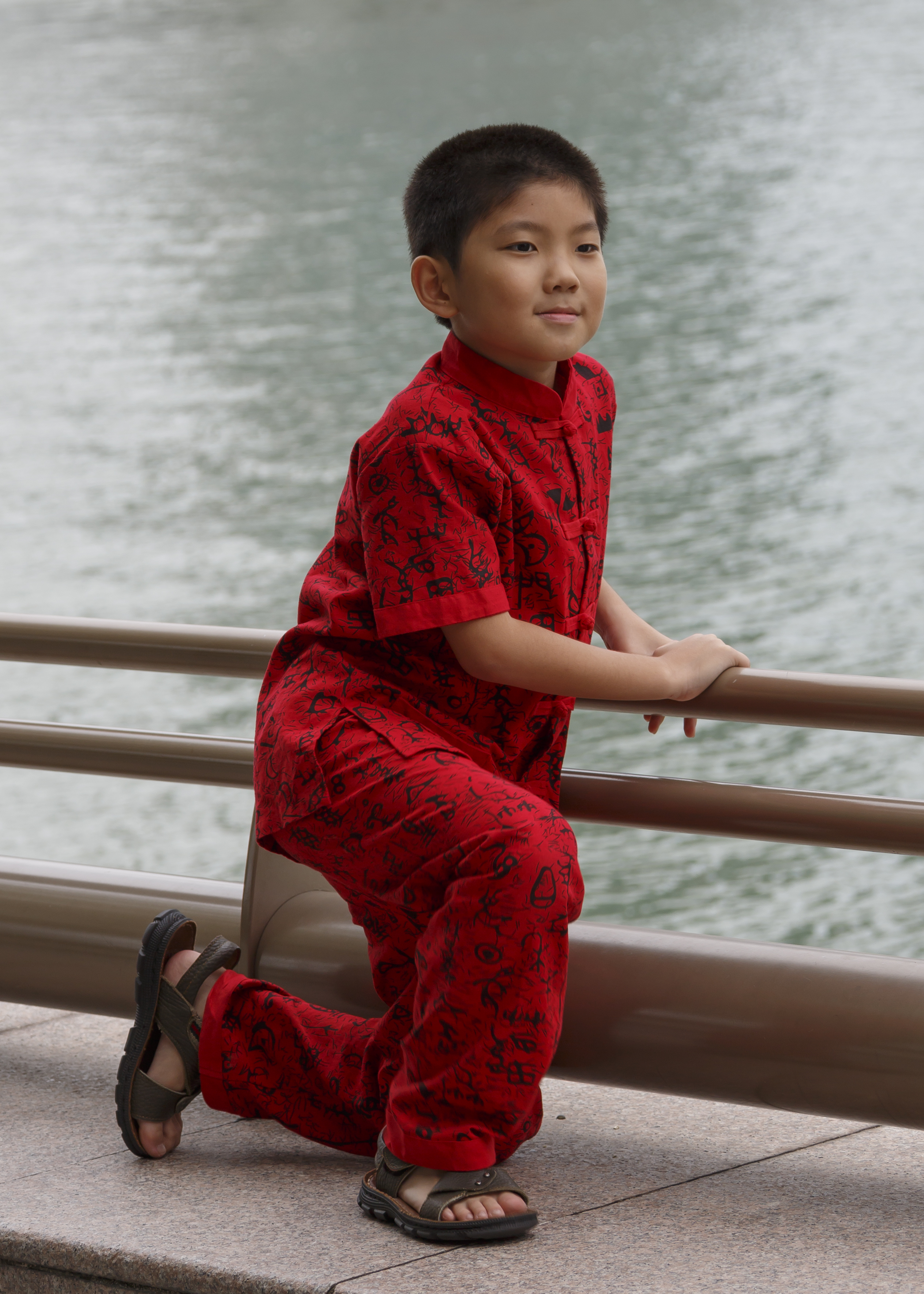
Chinese boy with brown hair

The natural hair color of East Asians is mostly brown to black. Regarding natural brown hair, Darkest brown and Dark brown to Reddish brown are the most common, and sometimes Darkest brown is mistaken for black. Medium brown hair is also quite frequent, and while light brown hair is less common than medium and dark brown, it's still present to some extent, not rare. Even hair that appears visually black can reveal its color when exposed to light if it contains natural reddish-brown pigment (pheomelanin). Like Europeans, East Asians' hair color gradually darkens with age, which is why there are more young people with brown hair.

===== Chinese =====
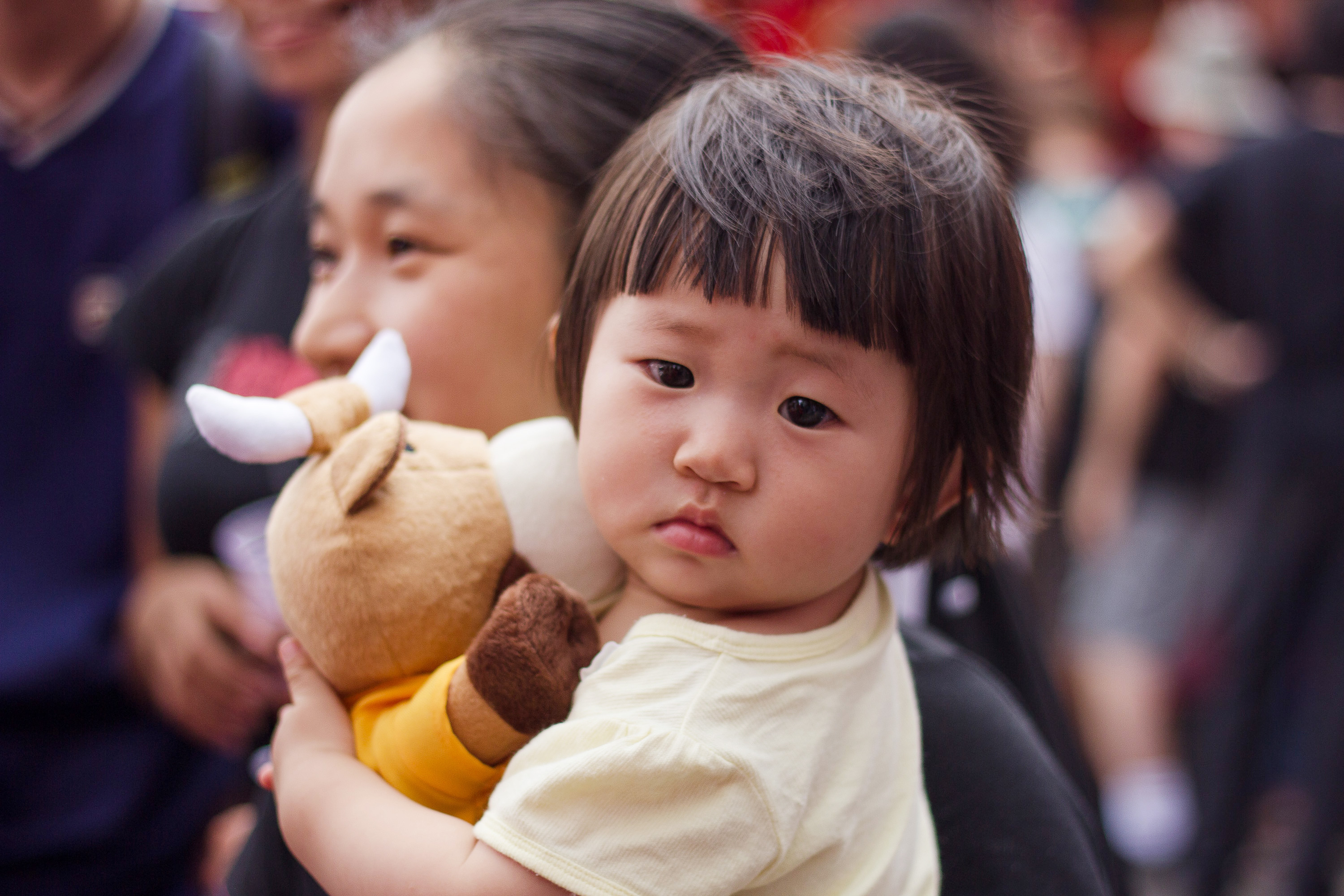
Brown-haired Chinese girl

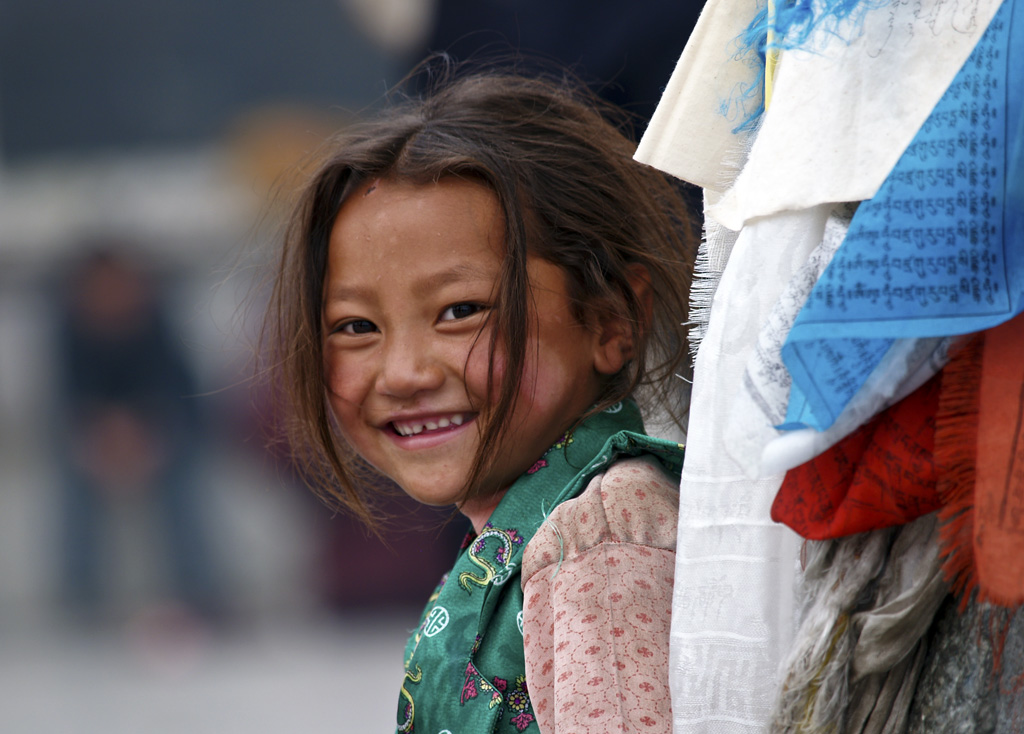
Brown-haired girl from China

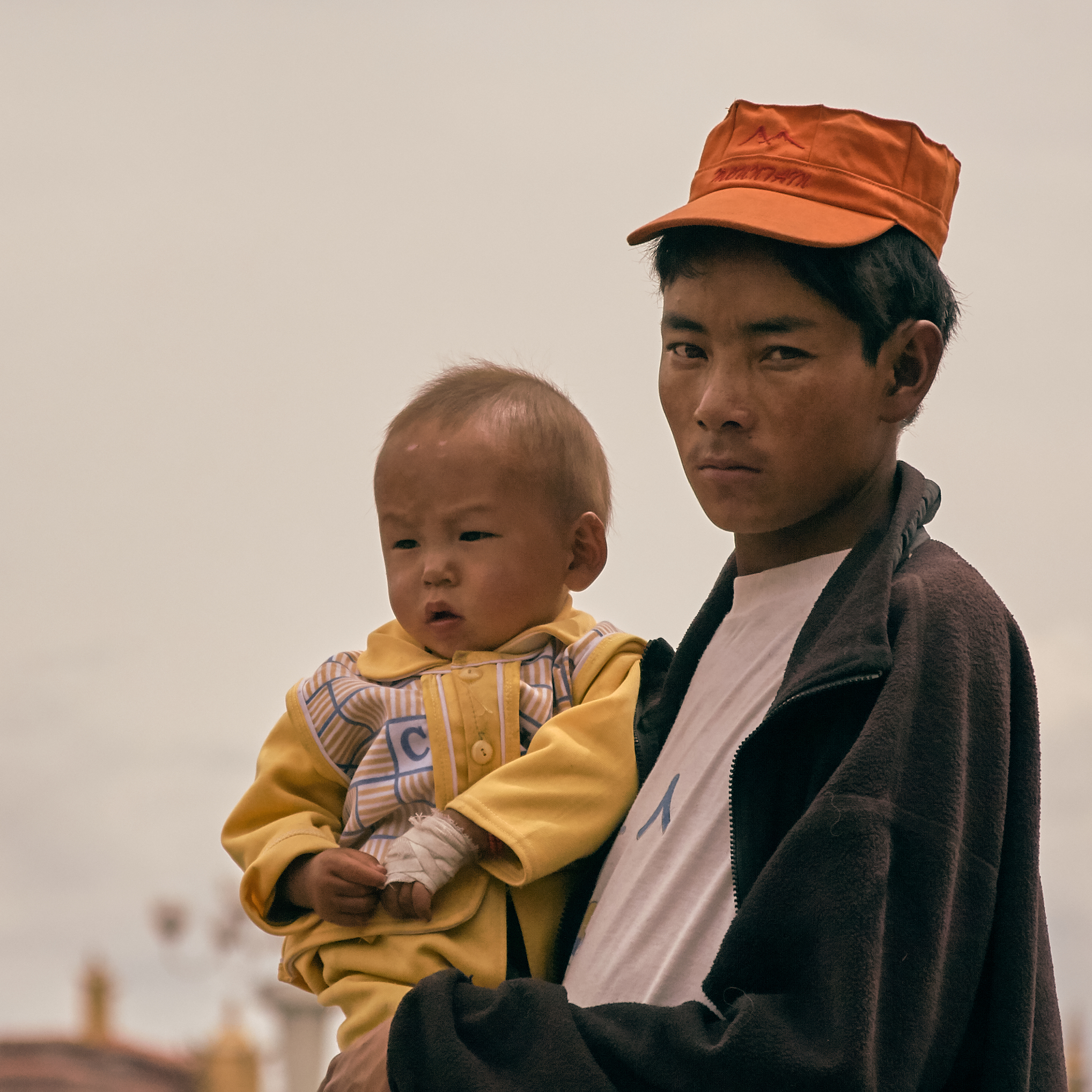
Baby with light brown or blond hair from China

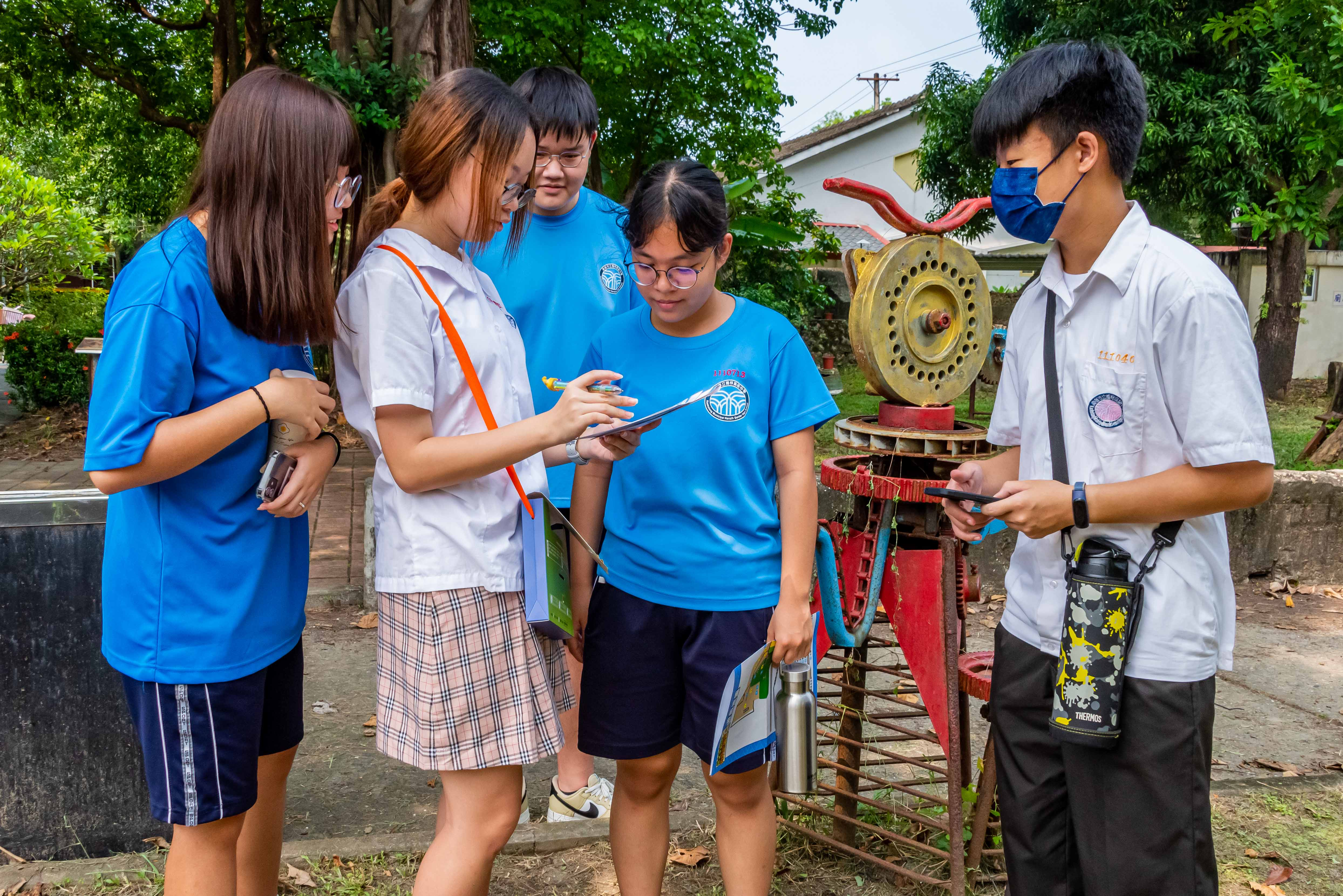
Two brown-haired Chinese high school students

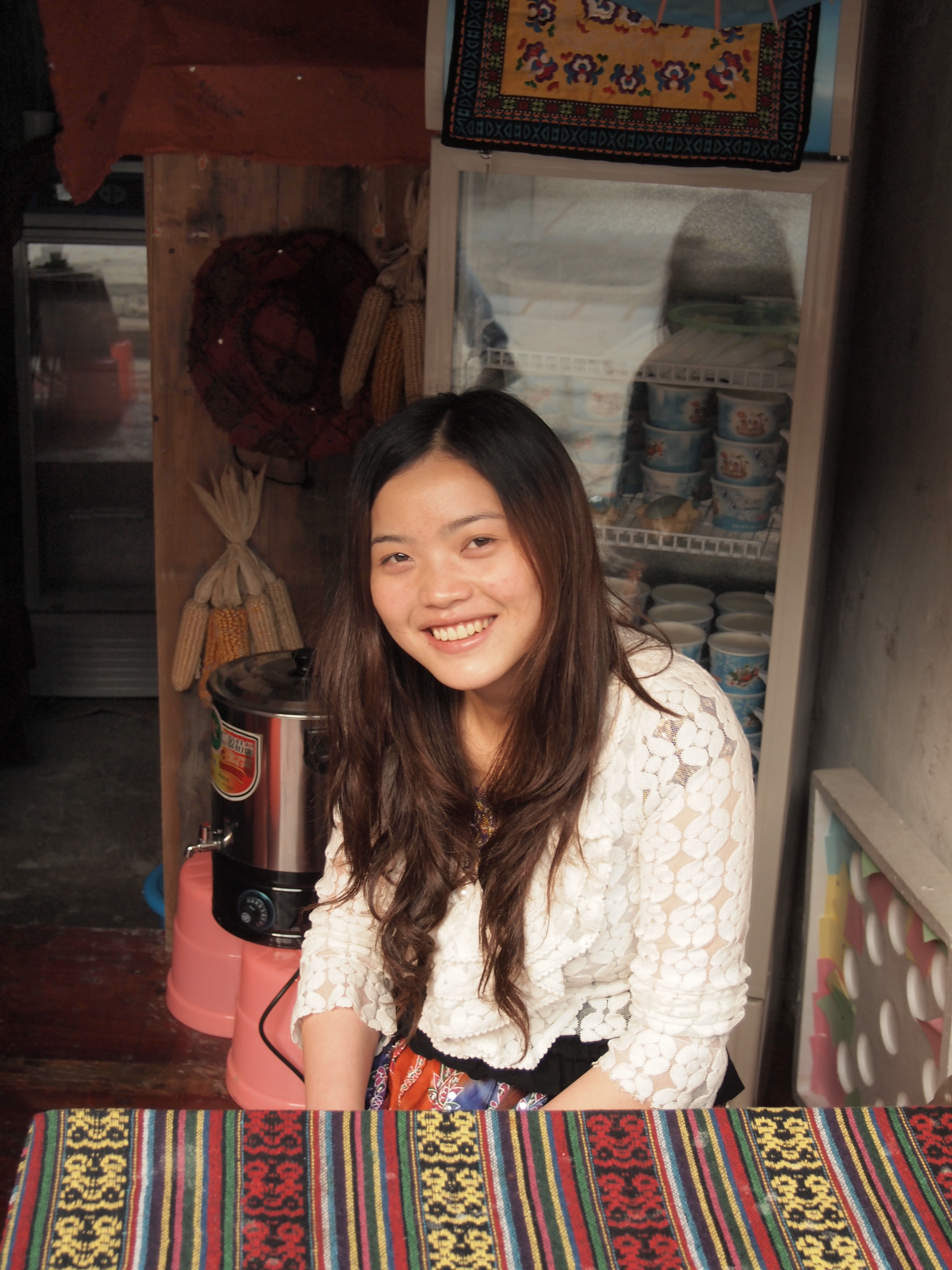
A brown-haired Chinese woman

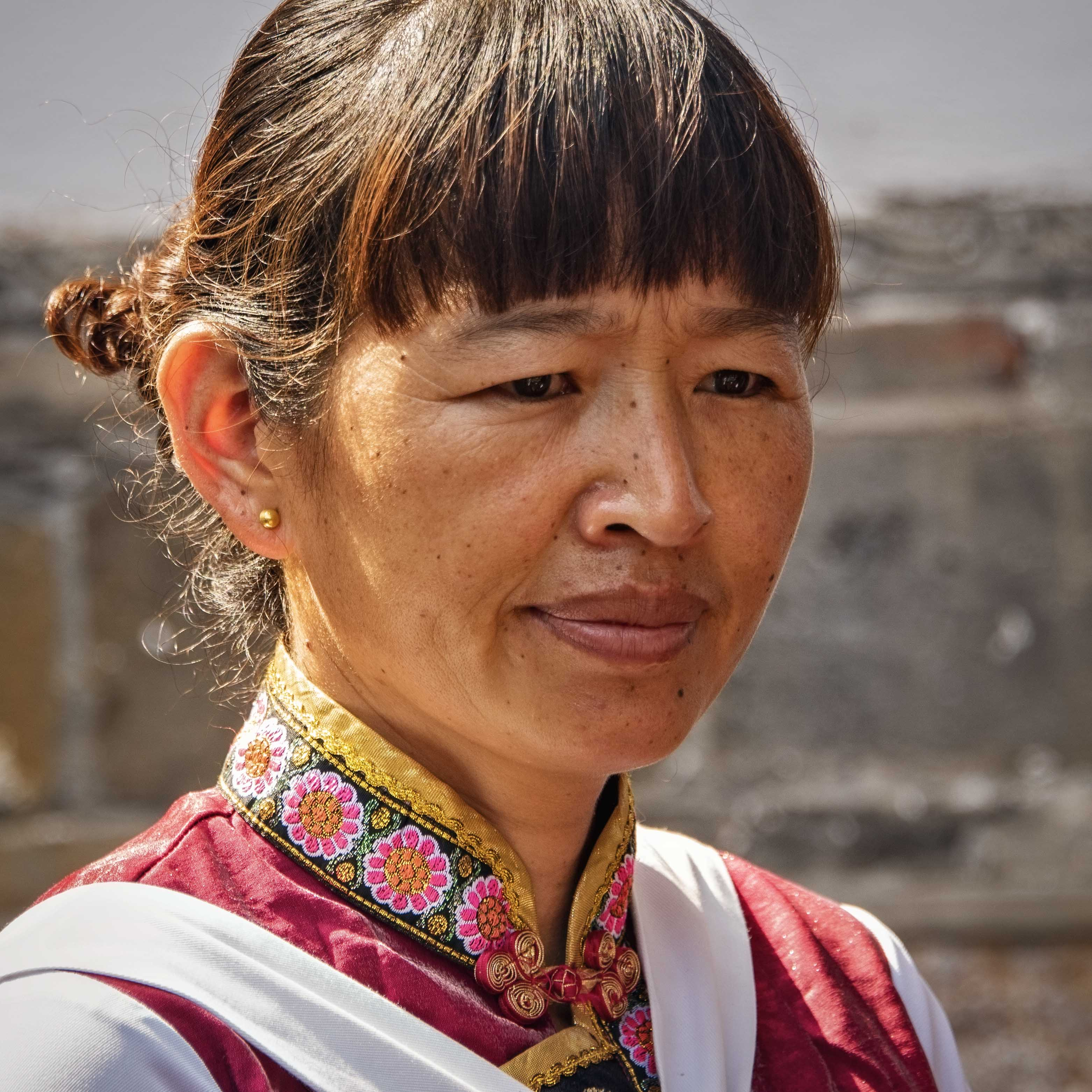
A brown-haired woman from China
(Dark chestnut brown)

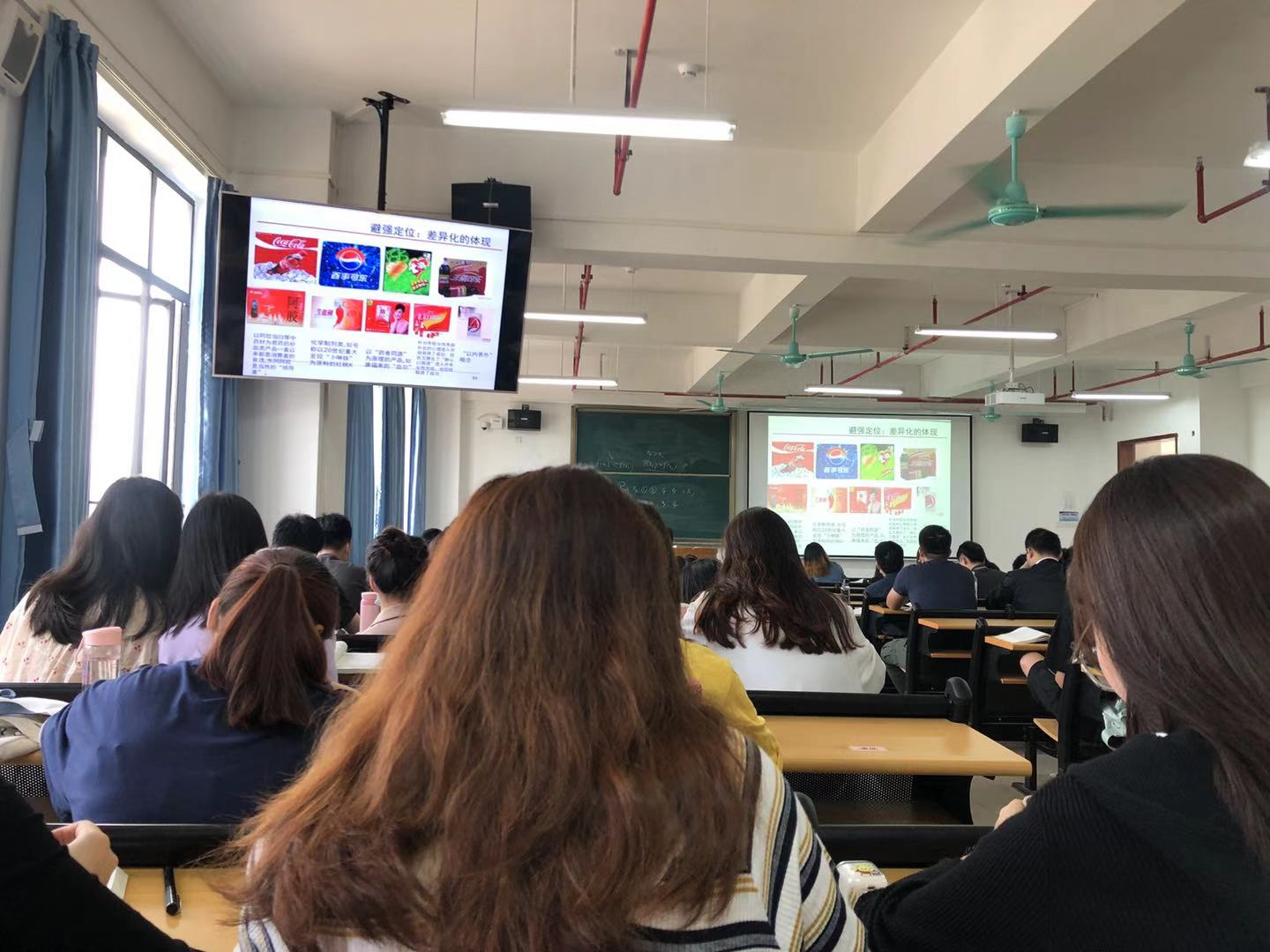
Four brown-haired Chinese students

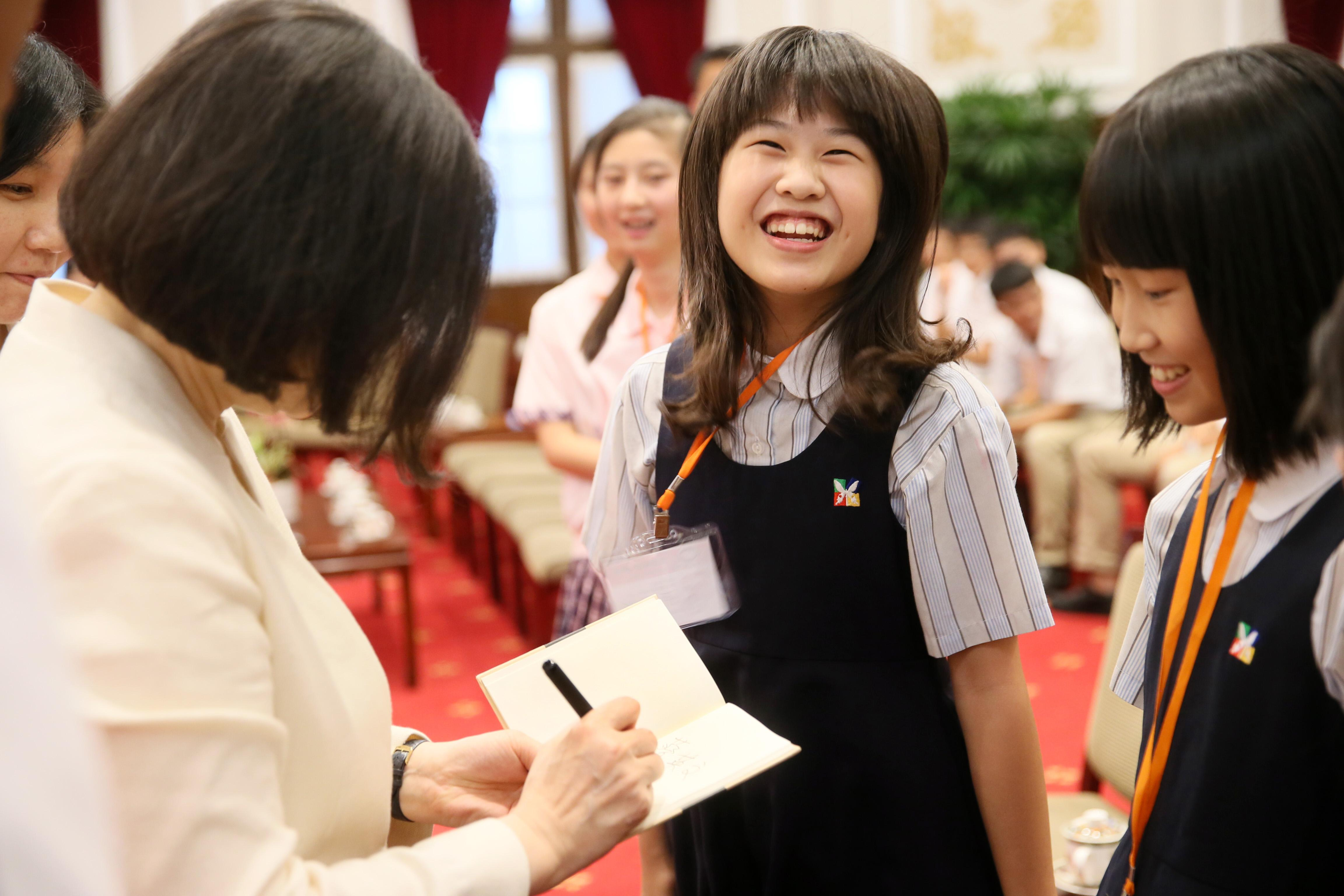
Brown-haired Chinese primary school student

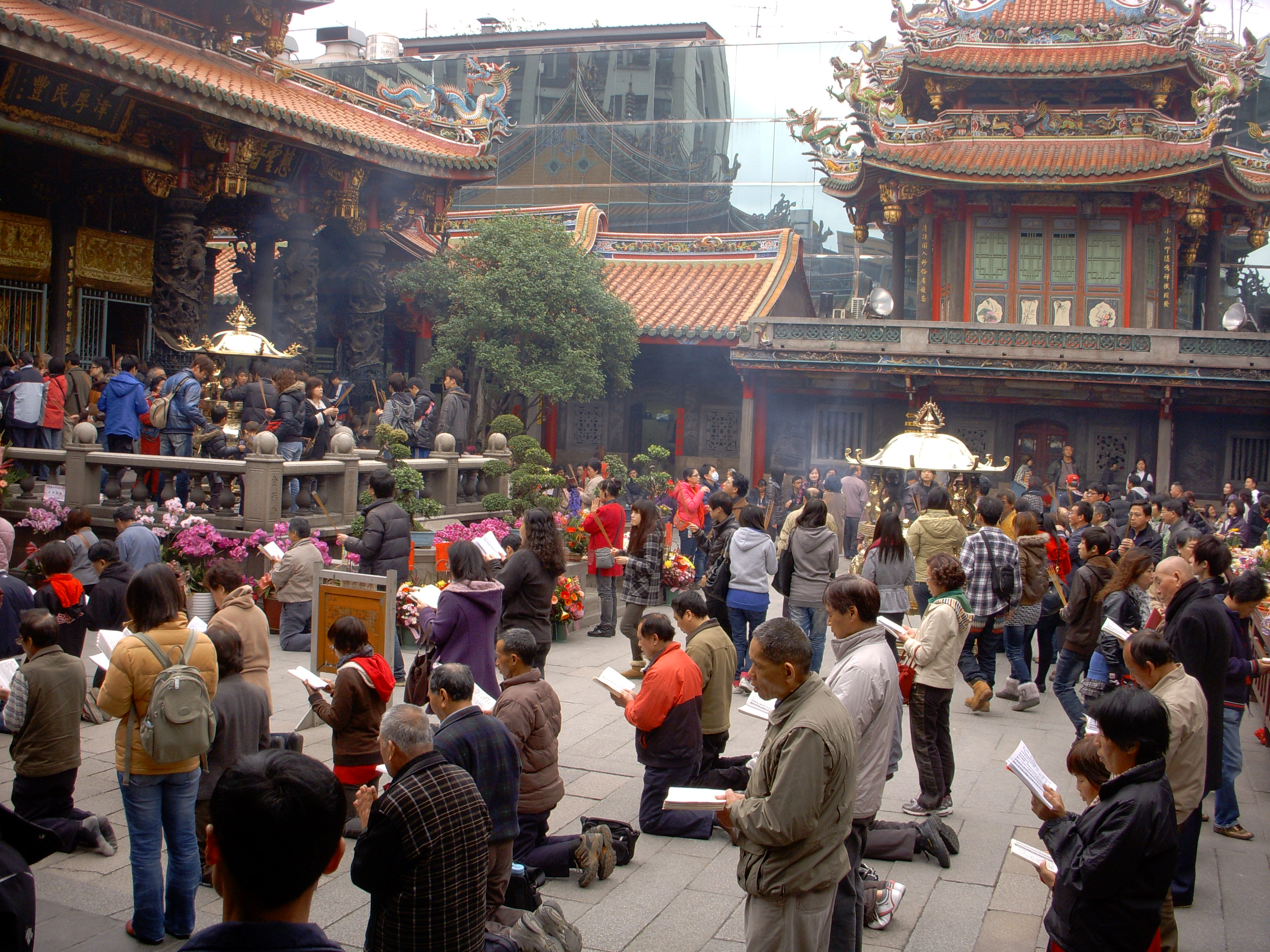
Chinese people are worshipping and praying to deities. Several of them have brown hair.

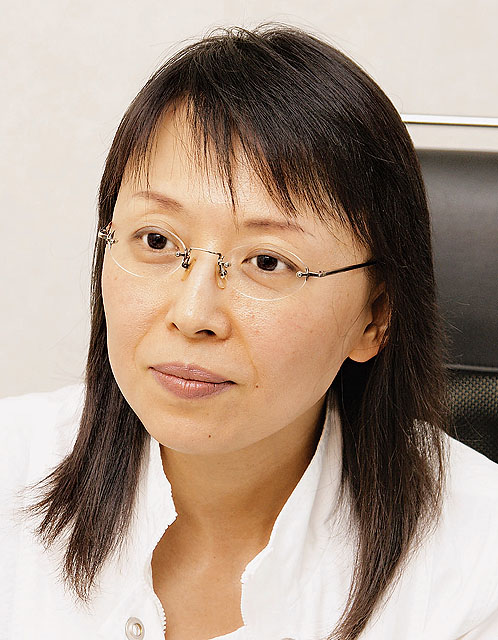
Brown-haired Chinese women
(Darkest Brown)

===== Korean =====
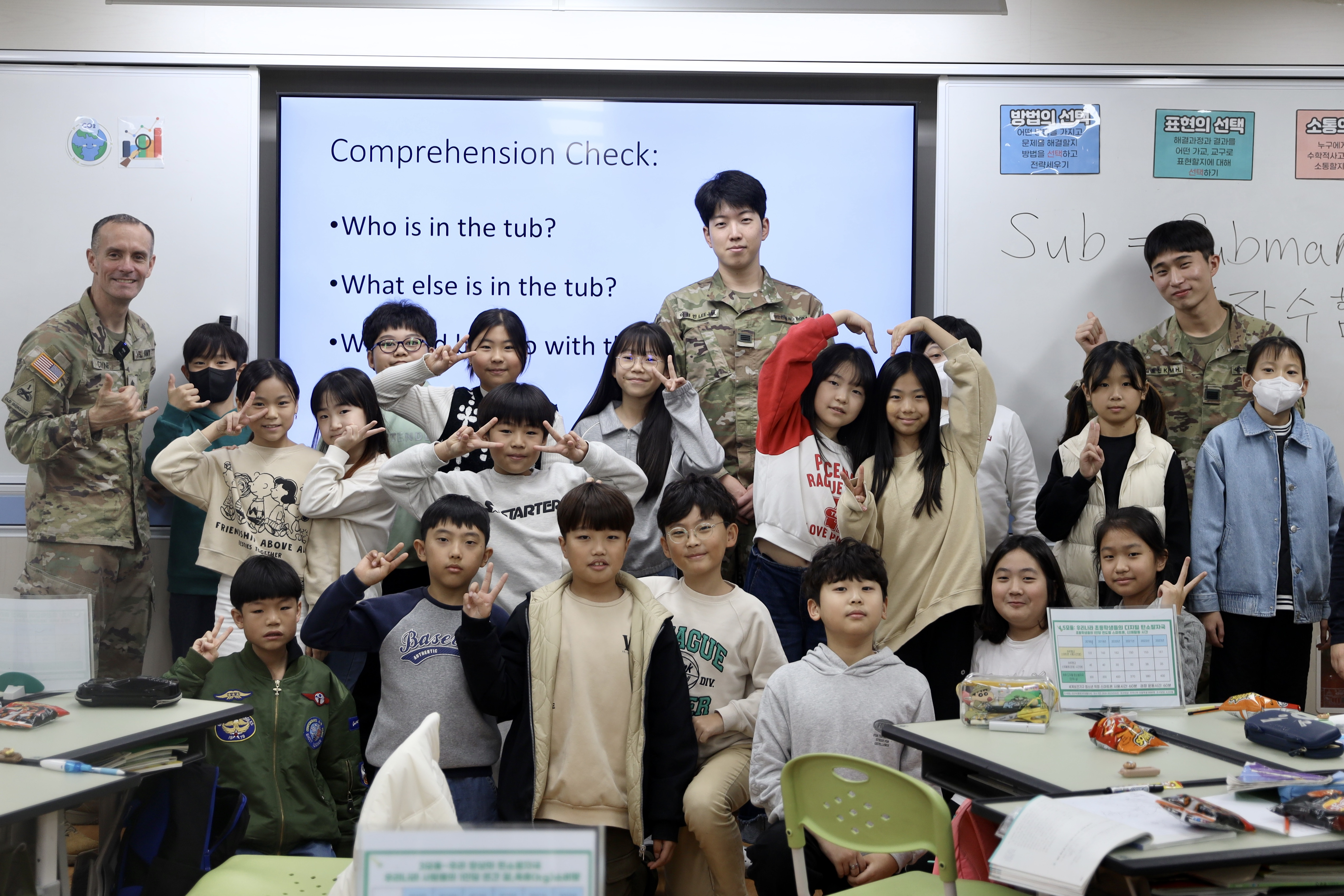
The Korean children, the boy in the front has brown hair.

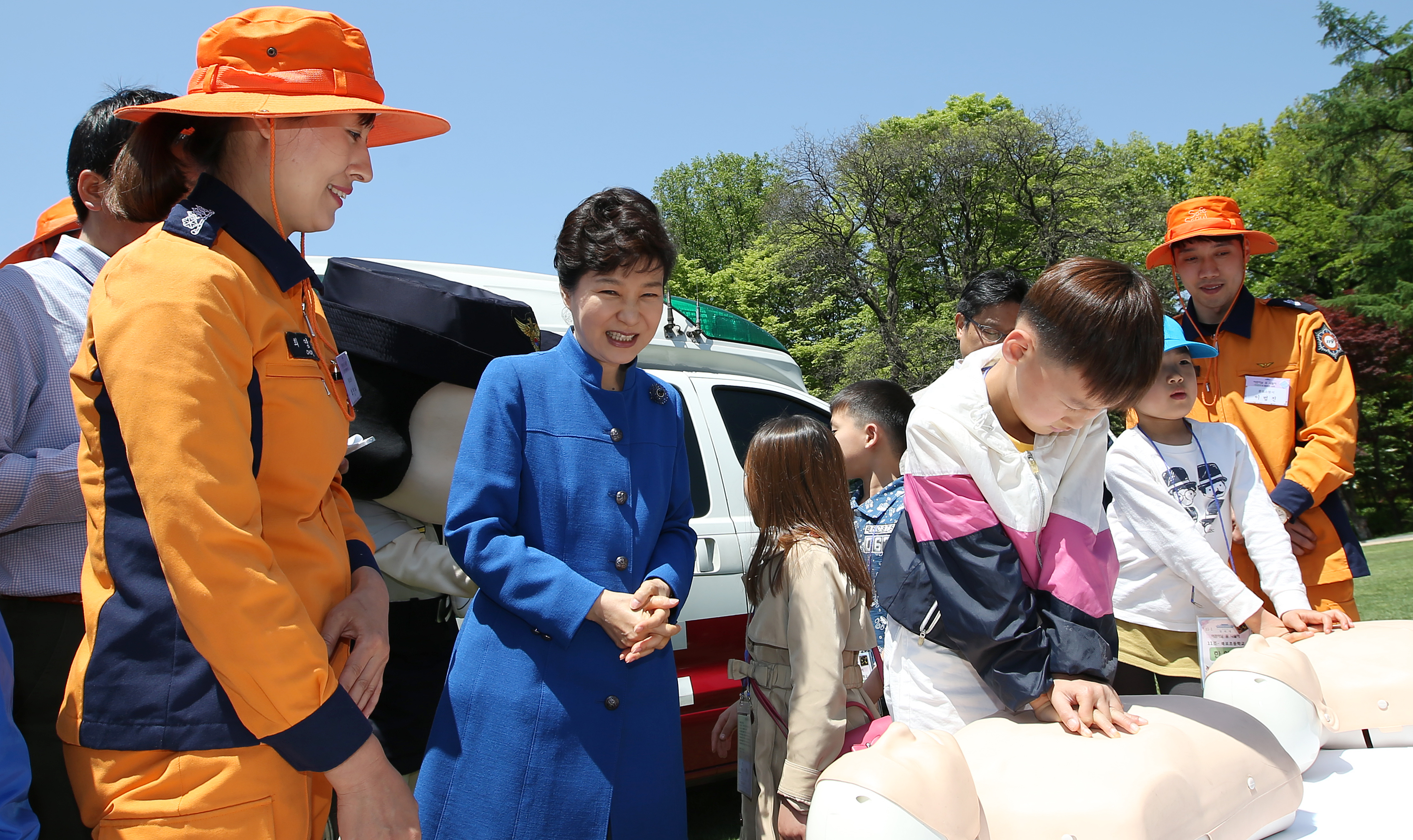
Brown-haired Korean girl and boy

===== Japanese =====
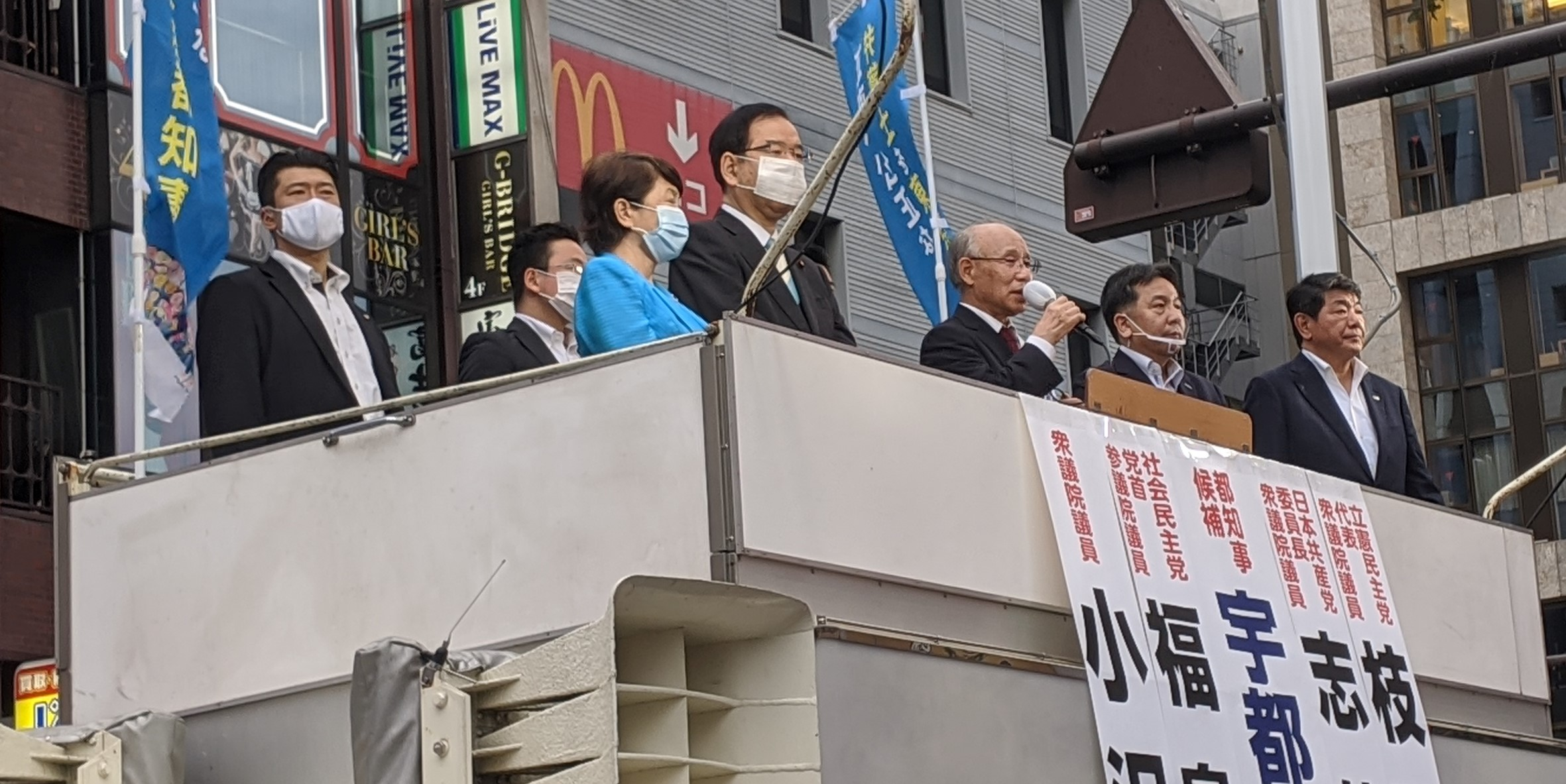
The Japanese woman had dark brown hair

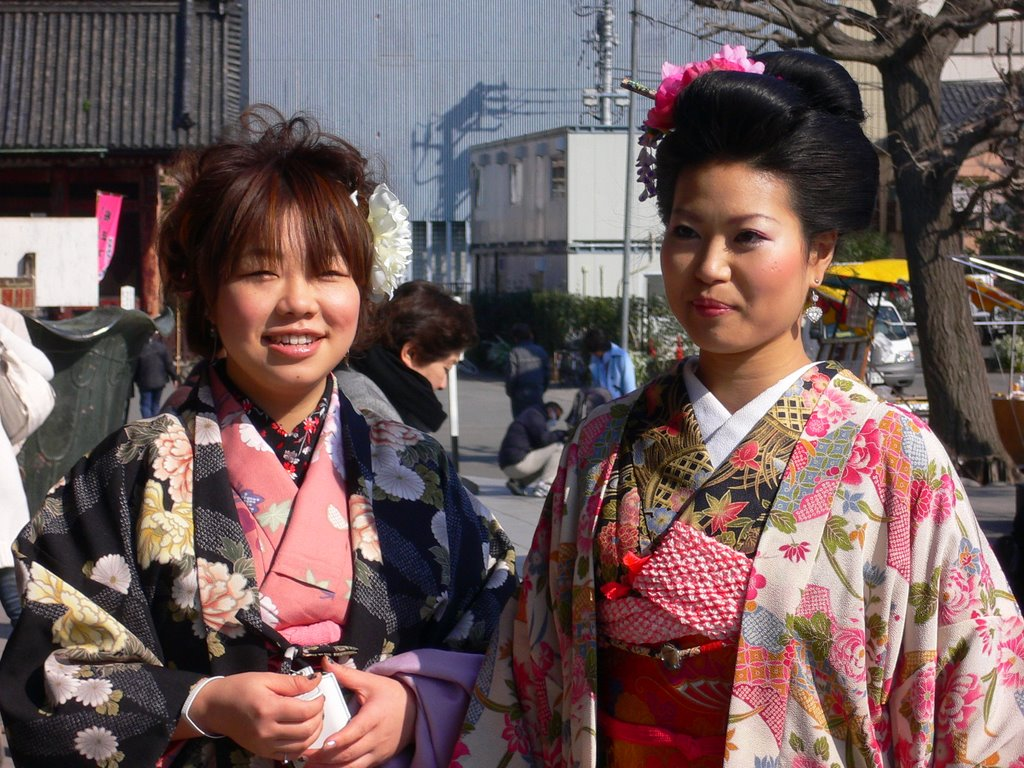
The young girl in front has dark chestnut brown hair, and the woman behind has dark chestnut brown hair.

A Japanese man with brown hair

Two of the women performing had brown hair.

Japanese people on the street. Several of them have brown hair.

==== Southeast Asia ====
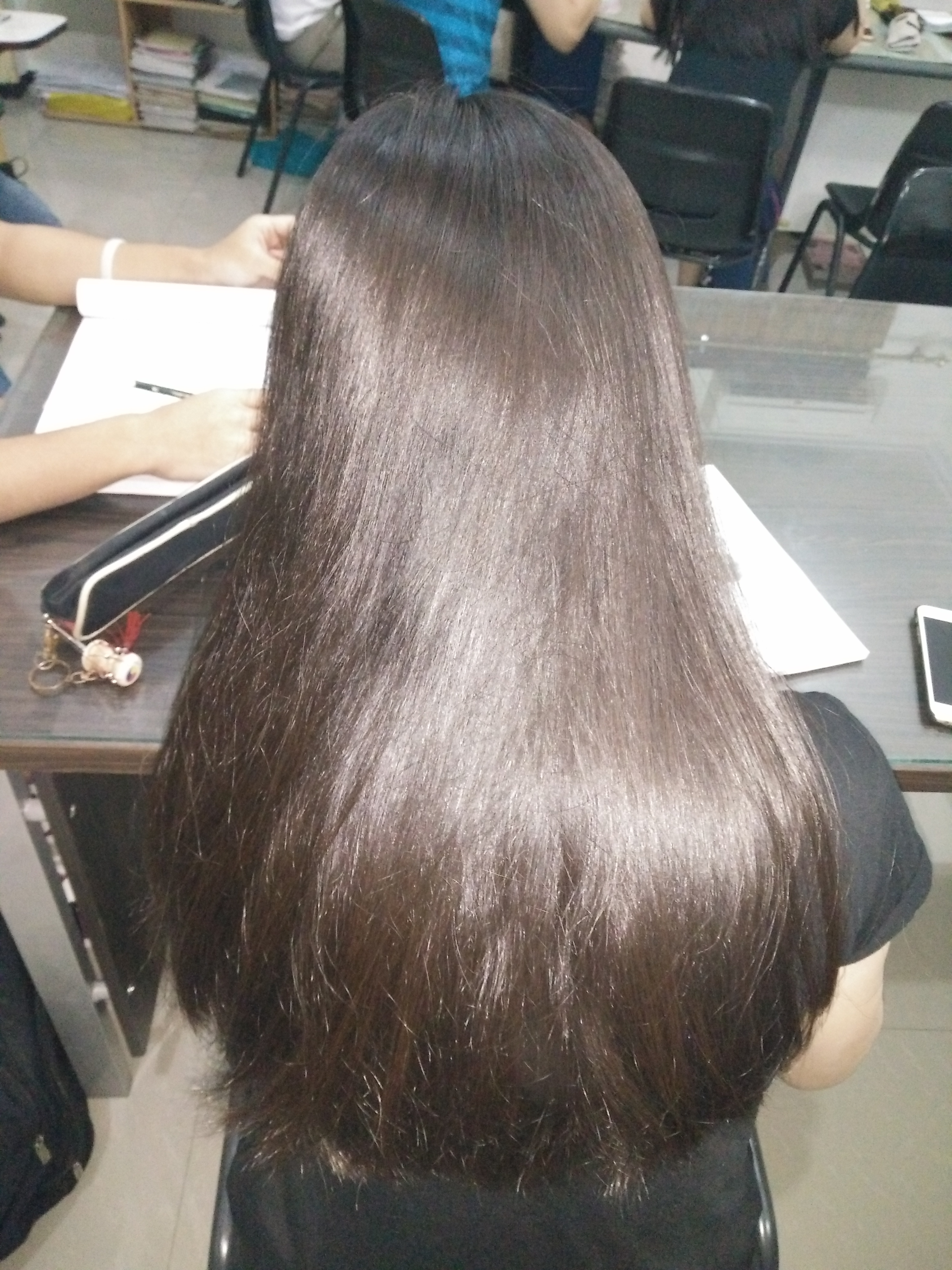
Indonesian girl's brown hair

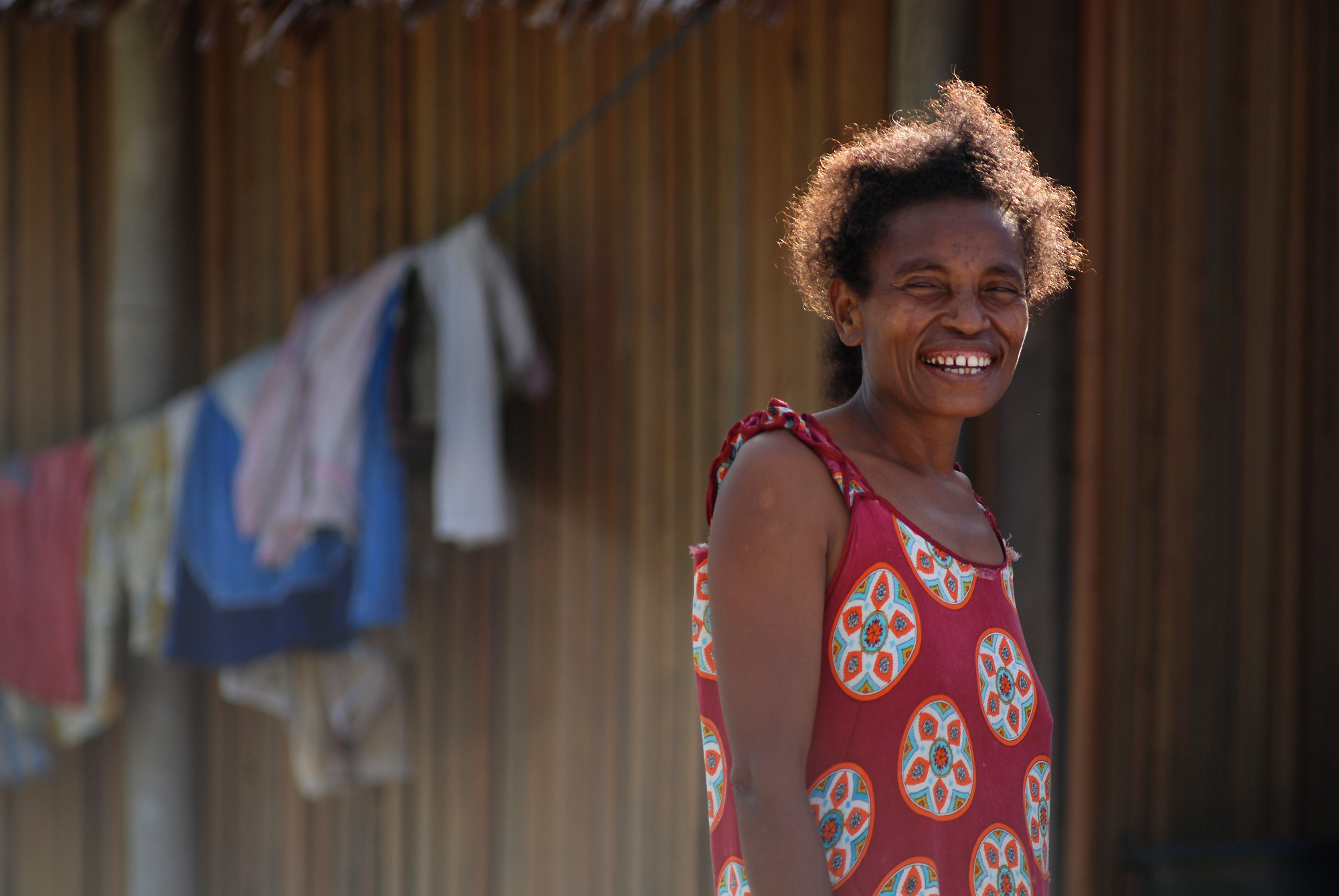
A woman from Biak

Brown hair is more common in most parts of Southeast Asia (such as the Philippines, Malaysia, and Vietnam) due to pigmentation changes, especially among young people.

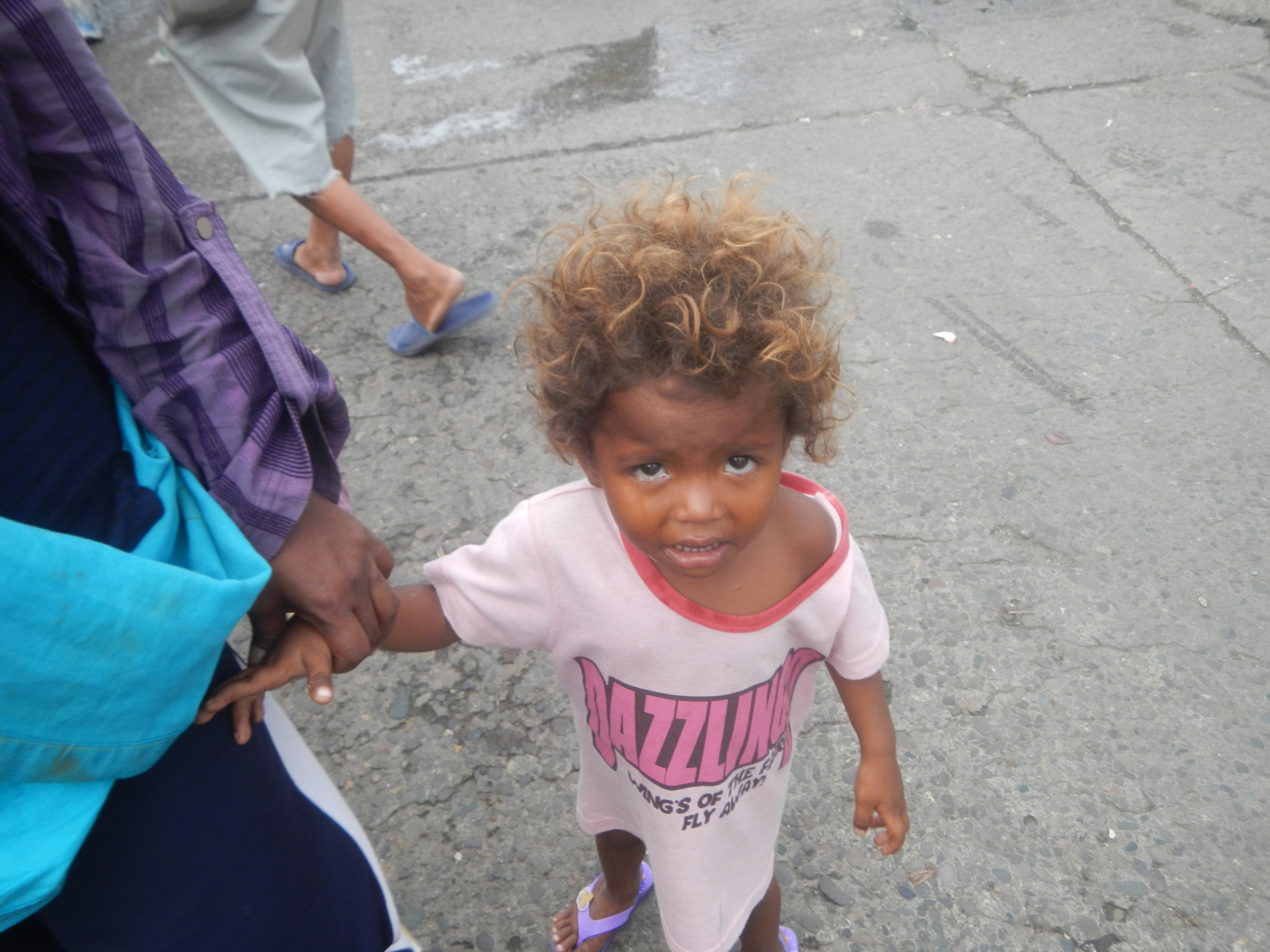
Aeta child in Baliwag.

==== South Asia ====
Brown hair in South Asia is typically dark brown, and some may be mistaken for black hair.

== Biochemistry ==
The pigment eumelanin gives brown hair its distinctive color. Brown hair has more eumelanin than blond hair but also has far less than black. There are two different types of eumelanin, which are distinguished from each other by their pattern of polymer bonds. The two types are black eumelanin and brown eumelanin. Black eumelanin is the darkest; brown eumelanin is much lighter than black. A small amount of black eumelanin in the absence of other pigments causes grey hair. A small amount of brown eumelanin without any other pigments causes yellow (blond) color hair. Often, natural blond or red hair will darken to a brown color over time. Brown-haired people have medium-thick strands of hair.

Brown-haired people are thought to produce more skin-protecting eumelanin and are associated with having a more even skin tone. The range of skin colors associated with brown hair is vast, ranging from the palest of skin tones to a dark olive complexion.

== Varieties of brown hair ==
Brown hair comes in a wide variety of shades from the very darkest of brown (almost black) to lightest brown (almost blond) showing small signs of blondism. Shades of brown hair include:

- deepest brunette: the darkest brown, which can be a very dark chocolate; sometimes appears to be off-black at a distance, and is often considered to be black. Sometimes the term "dark brown" includes the darkest shade of brown.
- dark brown
- milk chocolate brown
- dark chestnut brown
- light chestnut brown
- medium brown: standard brunette, comparable to Russet brown
- walnut brown: a warmer variant of medium brown, comparable to a light chestnut
- caramel brown: warm brown tone.
- light golden brown : the lightest brown, almost dirty blond
- mousy: a dull light brown color, sometimes seen as a dirty blond
- light ash brown: almost blond hair
- auburn brown: reddish-brown hair
- lightest brown: light brown that goes mid blonde in the sun
- maple brown: a dark golden brown color, like maple syrup
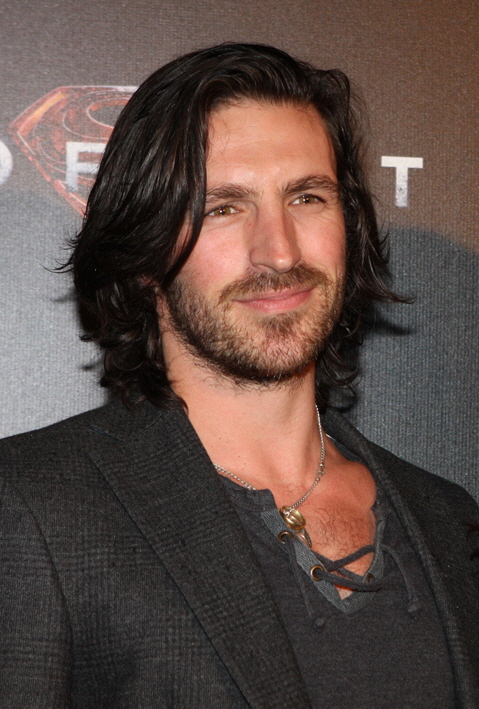
deepest brown
(Eoin Macken)

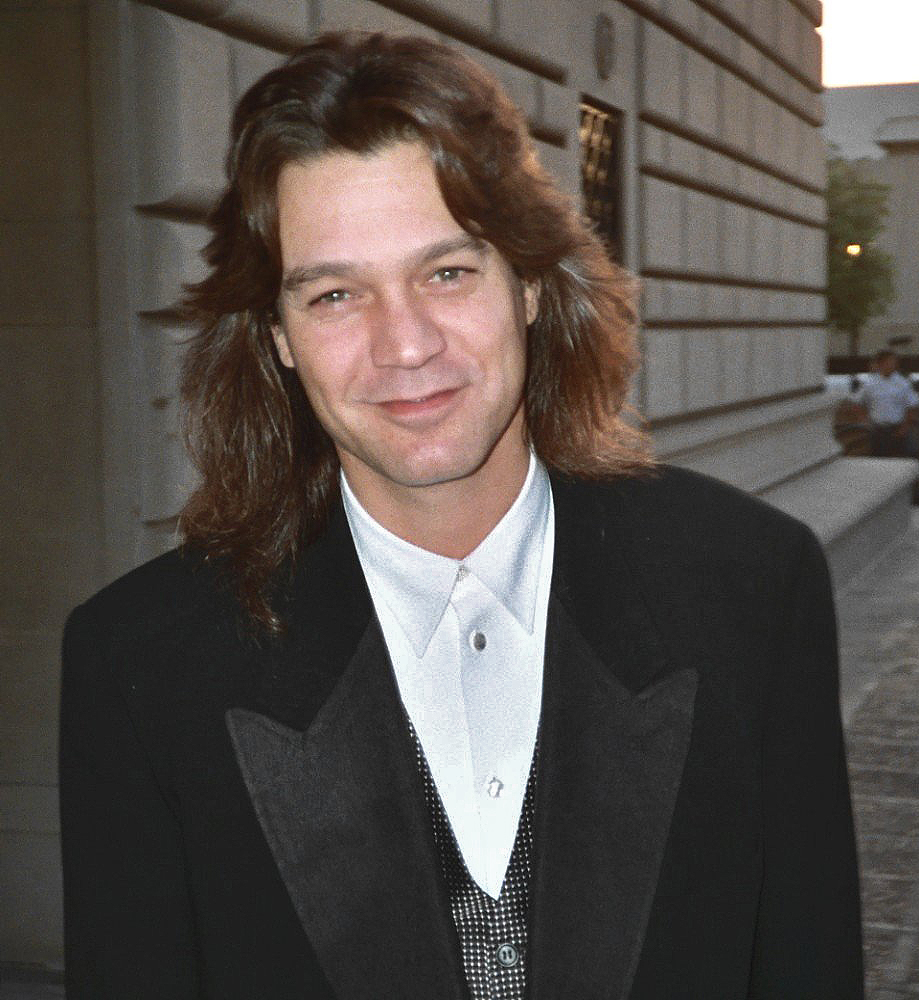
dark brown
(Eddie Van Halen)

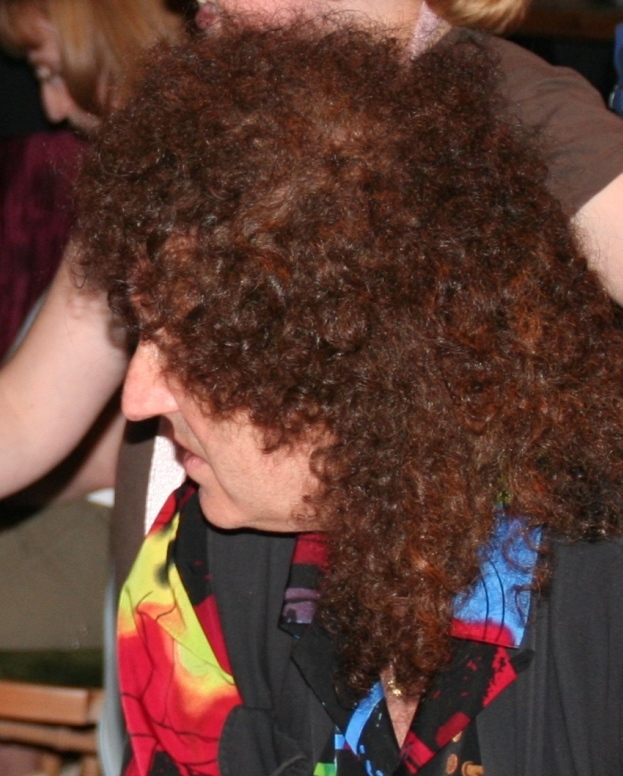
dark chestnut brown
(Brian May)

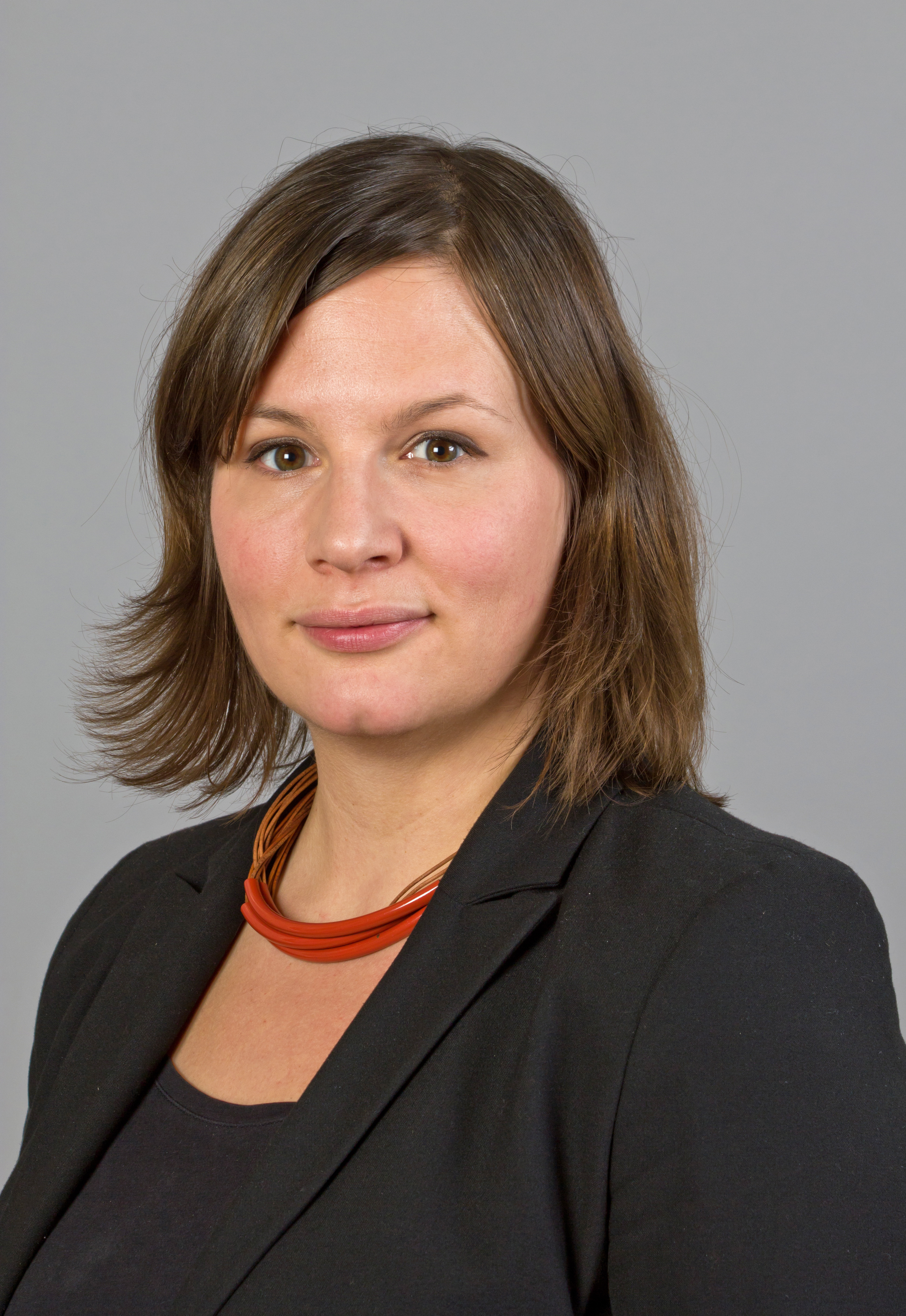
medium brown
(Antje Kapek)

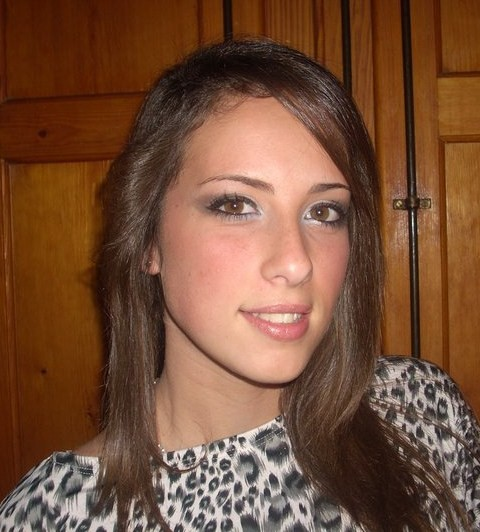
light brown
(Italian girl)

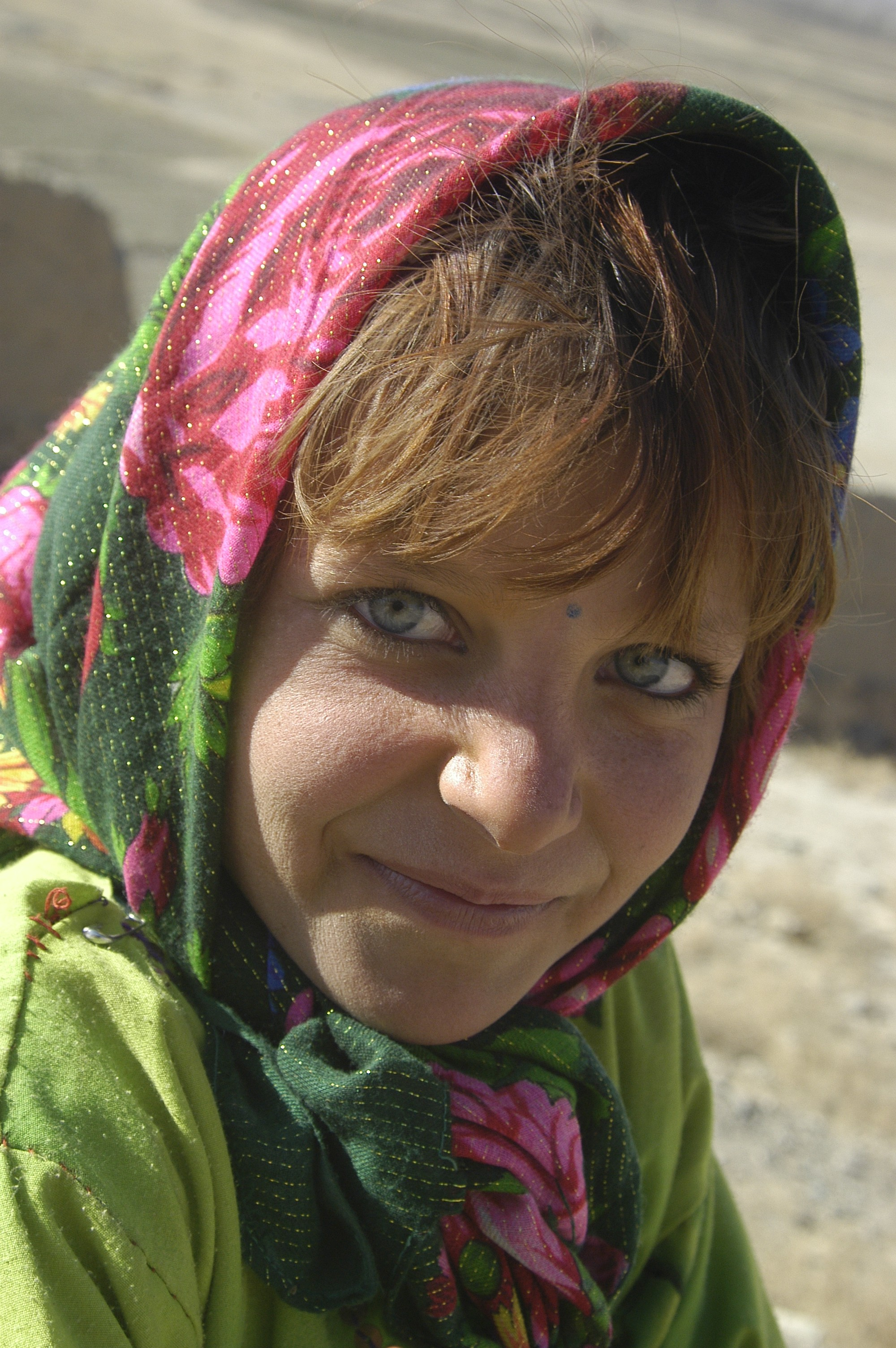
cinnamon brown
(Afghan Nuristani girl)

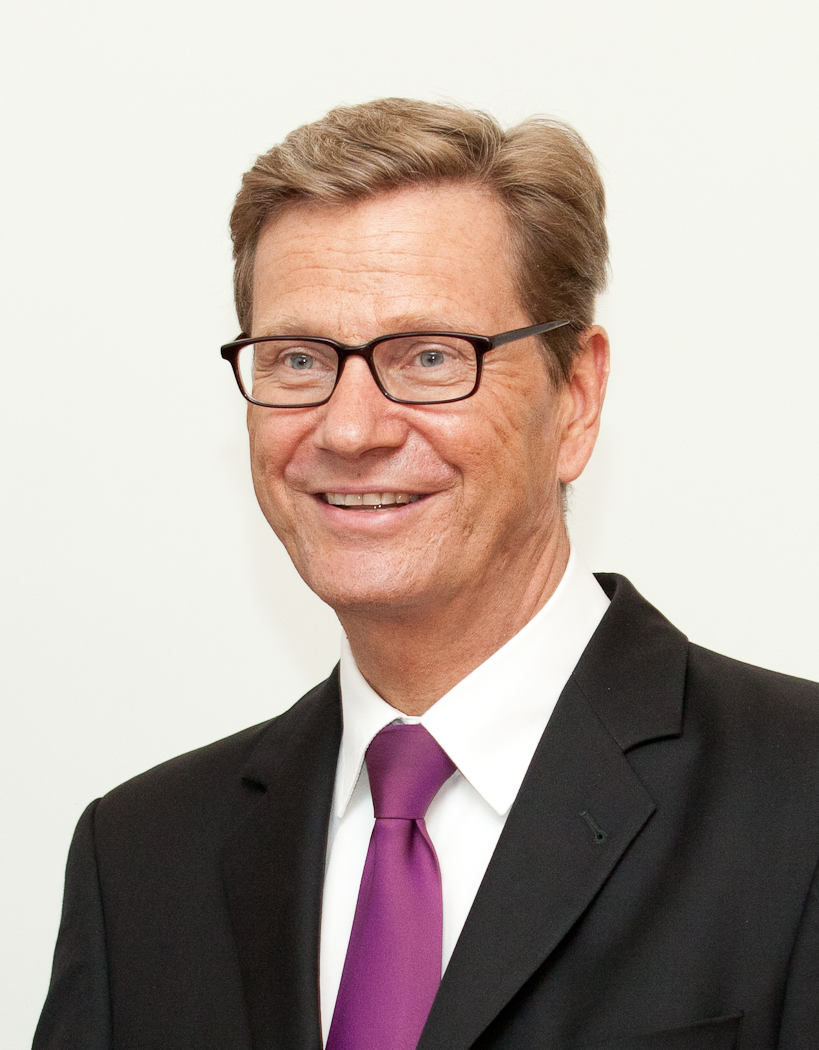
light ash brown
(Guido Westerwelle)

== Culture ==
=== Cultural connotations ===
In Western popular culture, a common stereotype is that brunettes are stable, serious, smart and sophisticated. According to Allure magazine, in 2005, 76 percent of American women believed that the first female president of the United States will have brown hair. The former Vice President Kamala Harris is a notable brunette.

=== Modern fiction ===
Anita Loos, the author of the novel and play Gentlemen Prefer Blondes, wrote a sequel entitled But Gentlemen Marry Brunettes. A film of this was made, Gentlemen Marry Brunettes, starring Jane Russell and Jeanne Crain.

=== Art and fiction ===
The Lady of Shalott from Alfred, Lord Tennyson's poem is depicted as a brunette in most paintings. The woman portrayed in Leonardo da Vinci's most well-known painting, Mona Lisa, is brunette. In the French folk song "Au clair de la lune", the likable Lubin visits his brunette neighbor at Pierrot's suggestion. In the Irish song "The Star of the County Down" the narrator falls in love with a woman with "nut-brown" hair, called Rose McCann.

=== Rivalry with blondes ===
In popular culture, brunettes are sometimes portrayed as being in a rivalry or competition with blonde women.

== See also ==
- Human hair color
- Human skin color
- Eye color
- Black hair
- Red hair
- Blond hair
- Melanin
