= Blonde versus brunette rivalry =

Term for rivalry between two women whose hair color varies

Brunettes competing against blondes was a popular way for the media to characterize beauty contests in the early 20th century

The blonde versus brunette rivalry is a rivalry—whether real, imagined, or fictional—between people with blonde hair and those with brown (brunette) hair. In popular culture and everyday conversation, the words blonde and brunette are used as nouns to refer to women by these two hair colors. This supposed rivalry is a common fictional theme in books, magazine articles, film, and television. Rachel Reinke proposed that the spectacle of blonde and brunette women engaged in physical fights with each other has been a male fantasy for many years.

Studies conducted in the Western world have found that dark-haired women are generally considered more attractive than blonde women. In East Asia, blonde women are ranked firmly below black-haired East Asian women in the female beauty hierarchy, and blonde women report feeling de-sexualized and masculinized by East Asian beauty standards. In one study, 92% of blonde women thought their hair color was the ideal; yet only 32% of heterosexual men considered blonde women the ideal.

== Historical context ==
""Blondes vs brunettes is an age-old battle that is regulalrly contested. For many men of European descent, the age old question of which woman is more desirable: blondes or brunettes. Blonde women are stereotypically portrayed as sexy, fun-loving and dumb. In contrast, brunette women are stereotypically portrayed as boring and sophisticated, but better lovers.

""From time immemorial, blonds and brunettes have cordially despised and hated each other; and lovers of beauty, according to unexplained natural affinities, have taken sides ... in this world-old struggle."

Competition and rivalry between blondes and brunette women dates back at least as far as Ancient Greece, where the blonde-haired love goddess, Aphrodite, "... inspired ambitious imitations among the dark-haired courtesans of ancient Greece." Helen of Troy, another Greek blonde, was also idolized by the men of her era. In response to men's reaction to blonde women, brunettes employed a variety of ways to lighten their hair, a practice that continues to the modern era. Ancient Romans also favored blonde women over brunettes, a social favoritism that continued well into the Middle Ages, particularly in art and literature. Nineteenth-century American literature had very specific associations with each color: "The maiden with blue eyes and blonde hair is invariably 'innocent,' 'good,' and 'pure'; while the dark lady is 'impetuous,' 'ardent,' and 'passionate.'"

During the early decades of the 20th century, as a reflection of society's fascination with female hair colors, it was popular for Hollywood's film industry to contrast the behavior and desirability of blonde and brunette women. Examples of the film industry's fascination with blondes and brunettes could be found in films such as Blonde or Brunette and Gentlemen Prefer Blondes.

== Competitive events ==
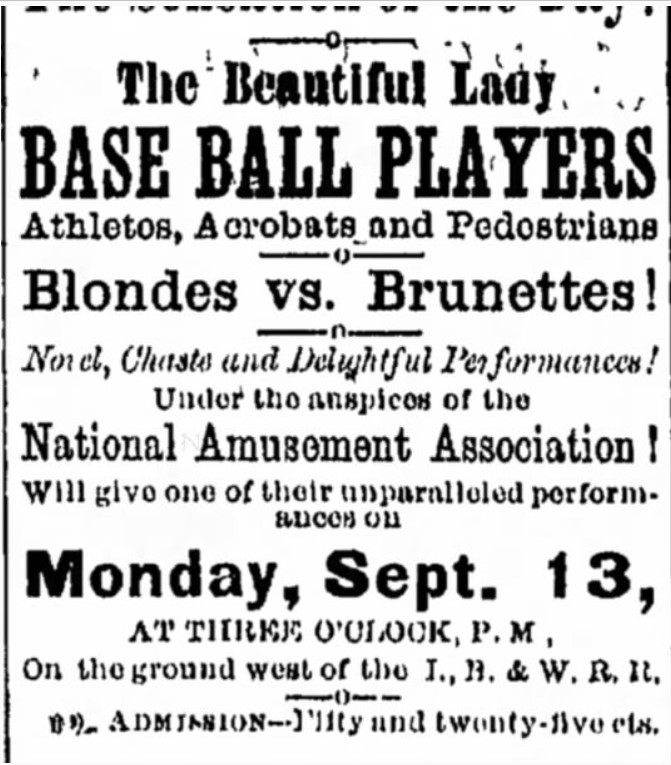
1875 advertisement for the National Amusement Association's "Blondes vs Brunettes" baseball game.

For well over a century, blonde and brunette women have been competing against each other in a variety of formats such as baseball, basketball, football, swimming and golf. Pairing blonde women against brunettes in wrestling, boxing, and similar exhibitions has long drawn the special interest of men.

=== Baseball ===
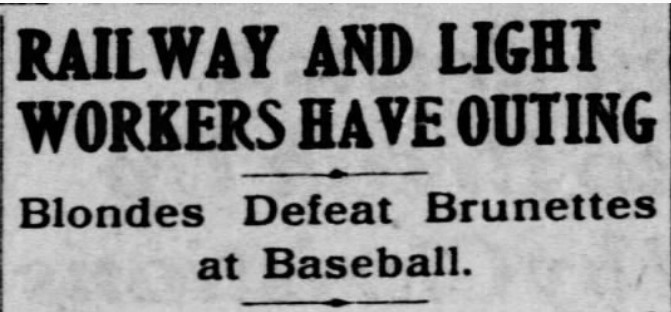
Fairs and picnics often featured sporting events between blondes and brunettes

An example of the blonde vs. brunette rivalry in the U.S. being used in a competitive event dates back to at least 1875 when the first female professional baseball players were recruited to play on teams according to their hair color. Illinois businessman Frank Myers established the "National Amusement Association" that advertised the novelty of women playing baseball. Despite Myers promoting the games as family entertainment, suitable for women and children, the first several games in his home state of Illinois were attended almost exclusively by men. Media reaction was severe, as many newspapers decried the event as "revolting" and "... a species of semi-immorality." Myers enterprise collapsed financially in less than a year, but the concept of blondes and brunettes playing baseball was picked up by Pennsylvanian newspaper publisher Sylvester Wilson who, similar to Myers, attempted to promote the sport as a healthy exhibition of female athleticism, suitable for all audiences. After successfully sponsoring a half-dozen well attended games, Wilson was arrested in New York city for employing girls under the age of 16 for "immoral purposes." Blonde vs brunette baseball games continued after Wilson's efforts failed and for decades were a popular event to stage at picnics and fairs.

=== Beauty contests ===
During much of the 20th century, promoting beauty contests between blondes and brunettes was a popular event. At times the contests were part of promotional activities such as the contests held in movie theaters showing the 1925 film Blonde or Brunette. At other times, they were held simply to spur interest in concurrent activities involving commerce and trade. A variation held beauty contests separate, one for blondes and another for brunettes, and then once the winner in those two categories were determined, brought them together for a final contest to pick the overall winner.

=== Chess ===
Competitive events between blondes vs. brunettes extend to chess matches that began in 2011 as part of the World Chess Tournament held in Moscow. The match was hosted by the Botvinnik Central Chess Club and featured two teams of young girls, blondes dressed in light colors and brunettes dressed in dark colors. This division is a play on the fact that chess is a game played using light and dark pieces. All of the contestants had to prove a degree of expertise to participate. The inaugural 2011 match was won by the brunettes who also went on to win the 2016, 2018, and 2019 matches. The team of blondes, by comparison, defeated the brunettes in 2012, 2014, 2015, and 2017. The 2013 match, also held at the Central Chess Club, resulted in a tie score. Brunettes continued their winning streak in 2020, defeating the blondes, 57:43. In 2021, despite the COVID-19 pandemic, blondes and brunettes played each other again, without masks. Brunettes prevailed by a score of 37:27. Although chess is a cerebral game, the matches between blonde and brunette girls have been described as a physical contest where the girls are fighting each other.

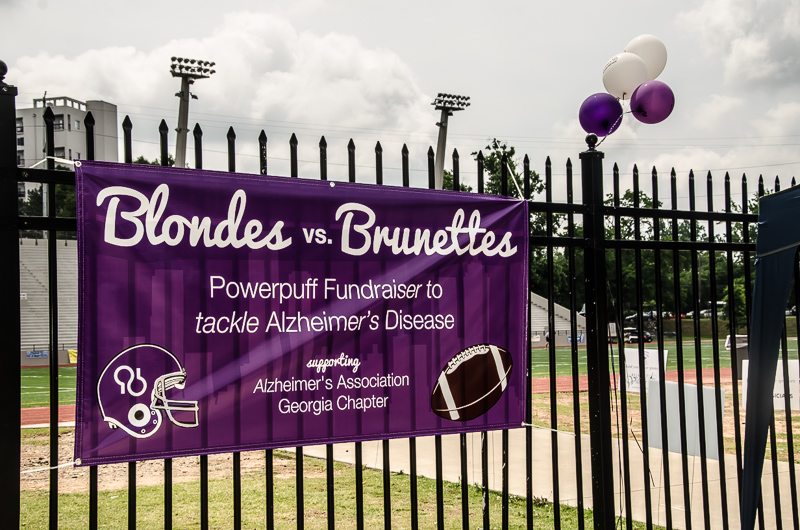
Game banner for 2014 Blondes vs Brunettes powderpuff football game

=== Powderpuff football ===
Powderpuff football games have long been a venue for blonde and brunette women to compete against each other. Featured during 1953's "Powderpuff on Parade" at UCLA, was an event where "Blondes ... battle brunettes in a football game at 3pm on Spaulding Field." In 2005, the Alzheimer's Association began sponsoring blonde vs brunette powderpuff football games as part of the association’s fund raising activities. Later that year, 2005, the first blonde vs. brunette powder puff football game was played at Hains Point in Washington, D.C. and raised $10,000. Motivated by the opportunity to have fun while supporting a worthy cause, interest in the games spread to multiple cities, assisted by media headlines designed to grab the public's attention: "Blondes battle brunettes to fight Alzheimer’s", "Blondes and brunettes battle it out to fund Alzheimer's research", "Blondes Battle Brunettes at the Cotton Bowl", "Blondes vs. Brunettes. This is how all battles should be played out: hair color", and "Blond women will battle brunettes to help tackle Alzheimer's disease at Cotton Bowl Stadium Saturday evening." In 2014, the Alzheimer's Association rebranded the games as "RivALZ", emphasizing other rivalries such as east vs. west or city vs. suburb.

=== Tug of war ===
During the 20th century, tug of war events during picnics, fairs, and festivals, often featured teams of blondes and brunettes competing against each other. During a 1918 picnic in Ohio, a tug of war between blondes and brunettes was "Won by the blondes. They stripped the brunettes off the rope against a tree like beads off a string." A 1933 women's club meeting in Missouri ended in a "jolly tug of war between the blondes and the brunettes. The blondes won." Sports writer Pete Axthelm refereed a 1978 tug of war between blonde and brunette women at a Kentucky charity event, declaring the blonde team, led by Anita Madden, winners of the event.

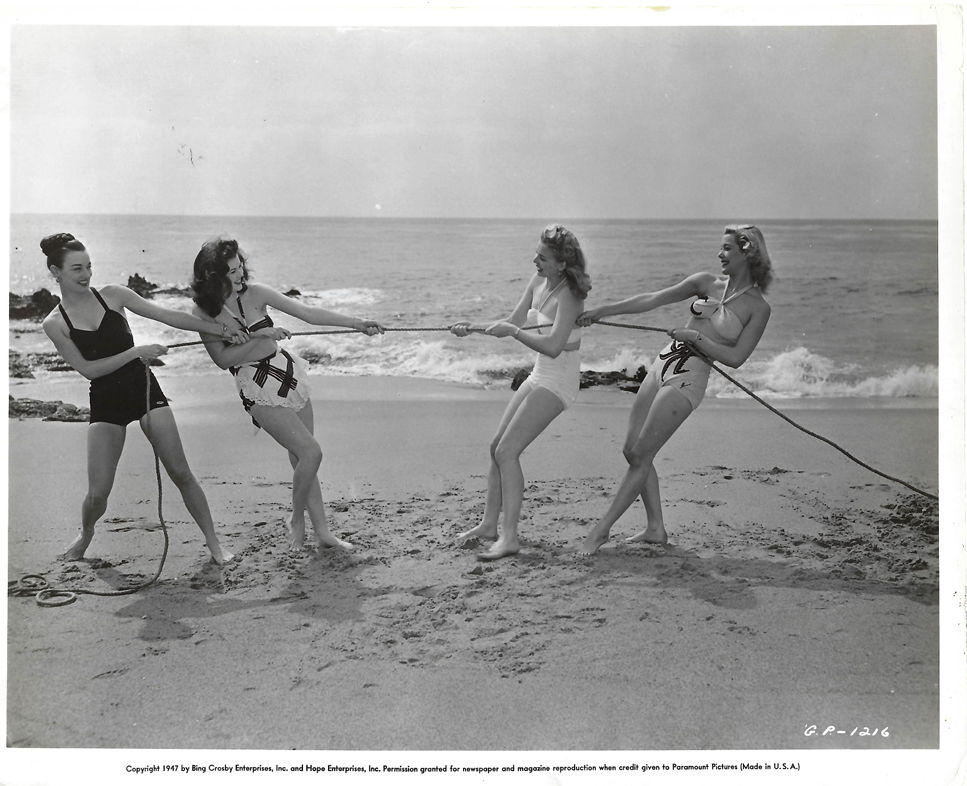
Publicity photo from the movie Road to Rio captioned on the reverse as a "blonde vs brunette tug-of-war".

Tug of war competitions between blonde and brunettes have been held in many countries. A 1939 event in Australia was "a novel event that created much interest." Held in London during the month of November, a swimsuit fashion show featured five blondes and an equal number of brunettes engage in a tug of war on a stage, all 10 wearing swimsuits. In Saskatoon, Canada, university men cheered loudly as a team of blondes students defeated a team of brunettes.

Blonde and brunette women have been more likely to engage in these competitions than men: a 1932 Labor Day picnic in Flint, Michigan featured blonde and brunette women competing against each other in a tug of war, the men's tug of war was between married men and single men. Blonde women defeated brunettes in a 1937 company picnic tug of war: the men's tug of war was between white collar and blue collar employees.

Tug of war competitions between blondes and brunettes have also been part of promotional activities. A promotional photo for the 1947 film Road to Rio showed several of the film's actresses having a playful tug of war on the beach. Titled "Beach fun, blondes vs brunettes in a tug of war" the photo showed brunettes Sally Rawlinson and Marliyn Gray engaged in a light-hearted tug of war with blondes Dorothy Abbott and Kathy Young. In 1955 to promote the film Gentlemen Marry Brunettes, the New York Daily News theater page featured an article titled "Colorful Battle", saying "Blondes and Brunettes will battle it out at noon October 29 in front of the Mayfair to celebrate the premier of Gentlemen Marry Brunettes. Every female with the right colored hair will be able to join in and pull for her side in a tug of war."

=== Wrestling ===
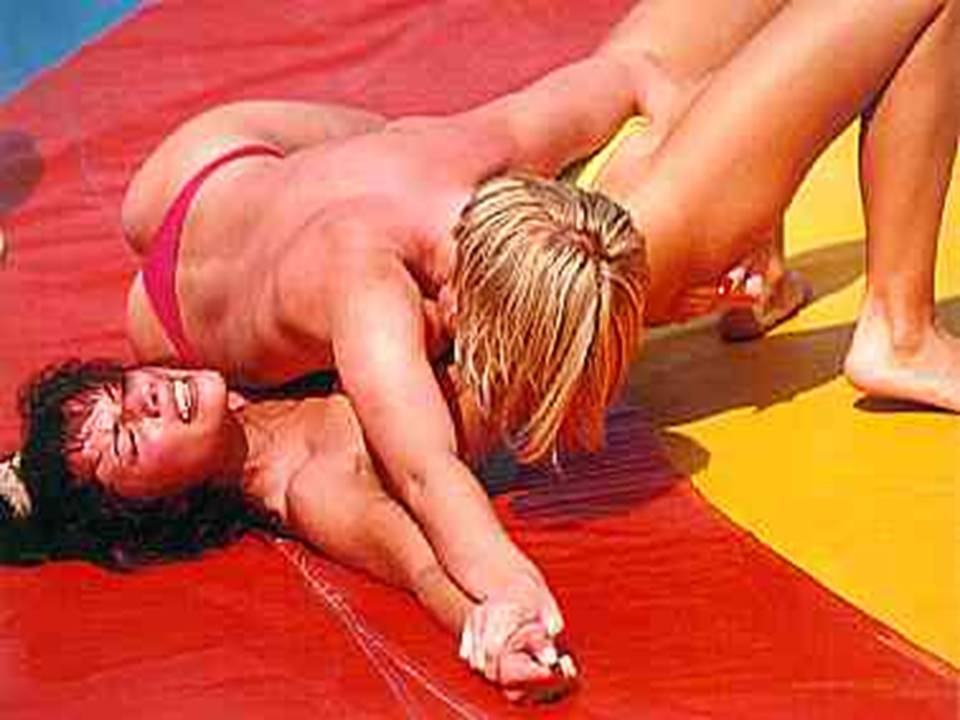
The European distributor of this female wrestling video described it as a "classic blonde vs brunette match" where the blonde decisively defeated her brunette opponent.

Matches promoted as "blonde vs brunette", have long been a staple of women's professional wrestling. Spectator interest in the events was often reflected in newspaper descriptions of upcoming matches: "It'll be blonde vs brunette for the women's world wrestling title tonight at the coliseum when blonde Penny Banner meets June Byers, the brunette title holder."; "It will largely be a girls show, the promoters calling it a battle of blondes vs brunettes."; and "Blonde Battles Brunette in Armory Tonight."

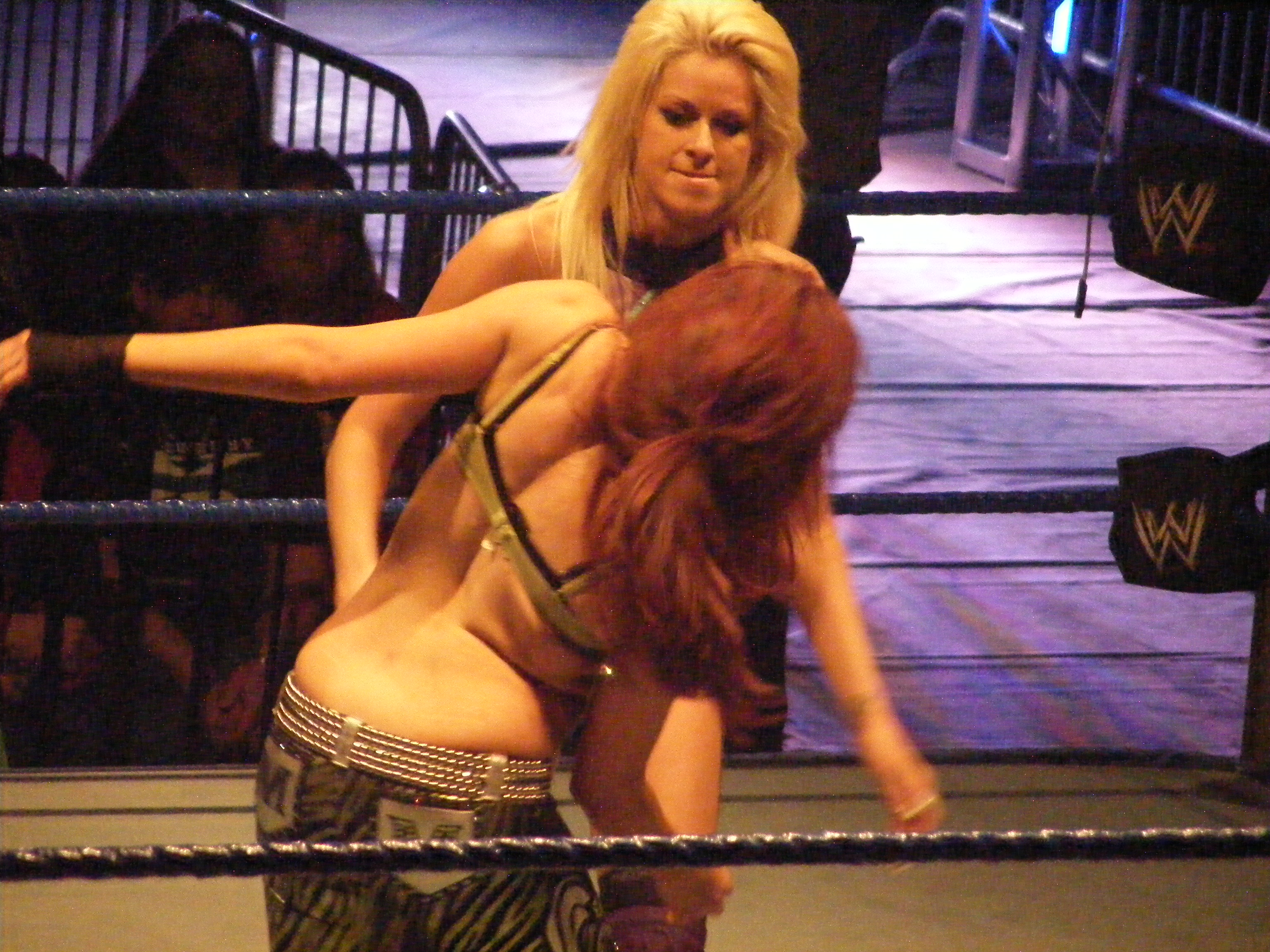
Maryse Mizanin (blonde) wrestling Maria Kanellis (brunette) at a WWE show

During the 1970s and early 1980s, Stanley Weston published Sports Review Wrestling, a magazine known for bloody covers and outlandish stories of the professional wrestling world. Faced with anemic sales, Weston began including feature stories themed as "Apartment House Wrestling" that showed posed photographs of bikini-clad models wrestling each other. Weston's staff writer, Dan Shocket would craft stories to accompany the photos taken by Theo Ehret, a notable Los Angeles sports photographer, and invent dialogue between the wrestlers. Leveraging the competition between blondes and brunettes, his the stories would include numerous references to hair color as the women fought each other, typically with the brunette making comments such as "What a loser, a dumb blonde with dreams of glory." The April 1978 issue featured a wrestling match between Gaby, a French brunette and Angel, described as "gossamer blonde." In her version of the fight, scripted by Shocket, Gaby referred to her opponent as "A stupid blonde. All the blondes ones are stupid."

A blonde model named "Cynara" became one of the series most popular wrestlers and was considered the Apartment House Wrestling champion. She was eventually defeated by a brunette named Salome.

== In the media and entertainment industry ==
Rona Barrett's magazine highlighted Hollywood's blonde vs brunette rivalry on the cover of her monthly magazine.

Matching blondes and brunettes against each other, especially as romantic rivals, is a Hollywood technique that extends back to the 1920s. In a 1932 interview with an Australian newspaper, Hollywood director Dorothy Arzner stated that lead women typically had brunette hair, while supporting women typically had blonde hair. Arzner also stated that blonde women were usually cast as "fickle" types, while brunettes are cast as "deep lovers." Physical competition between blondes and brunettes has also been featured in Hollywood films. The 1925 film A Thief in Paradise featured a polo match between blonde and brunette women. Promotional material for the film highlighted the contest between the two teams of women and reviewers focused audience attention on the spectacle with alliterative headlines such as "Blondes Battle Brunettes in Bathing Suits."

Rona Barrett used the phrase "Blondes vs Brunettes" on a 1978 cover of her magazine, Rona Barrett's Hollywood as a way of introducing the magazine's feature story addressing Hollywood's typecasting of blondes as dumb and brunettes as smart. A 1982 Us Magazine cover story leveraged the dumb blonde stereotype in an article titled, "Brains Vs. Blondes: Goodbye, T&A! Hello IQ! The "boob tube" cleans up with a bevy of smart but sexy brunettes."

A blonde vs brunette rivalry exists featuring Archie Andrews within the Archie Comics series, as the black-haired Veronica is introduced as a rival love interest of Archie Andrews with whom the blonde-haired Betty Cooper is in love.

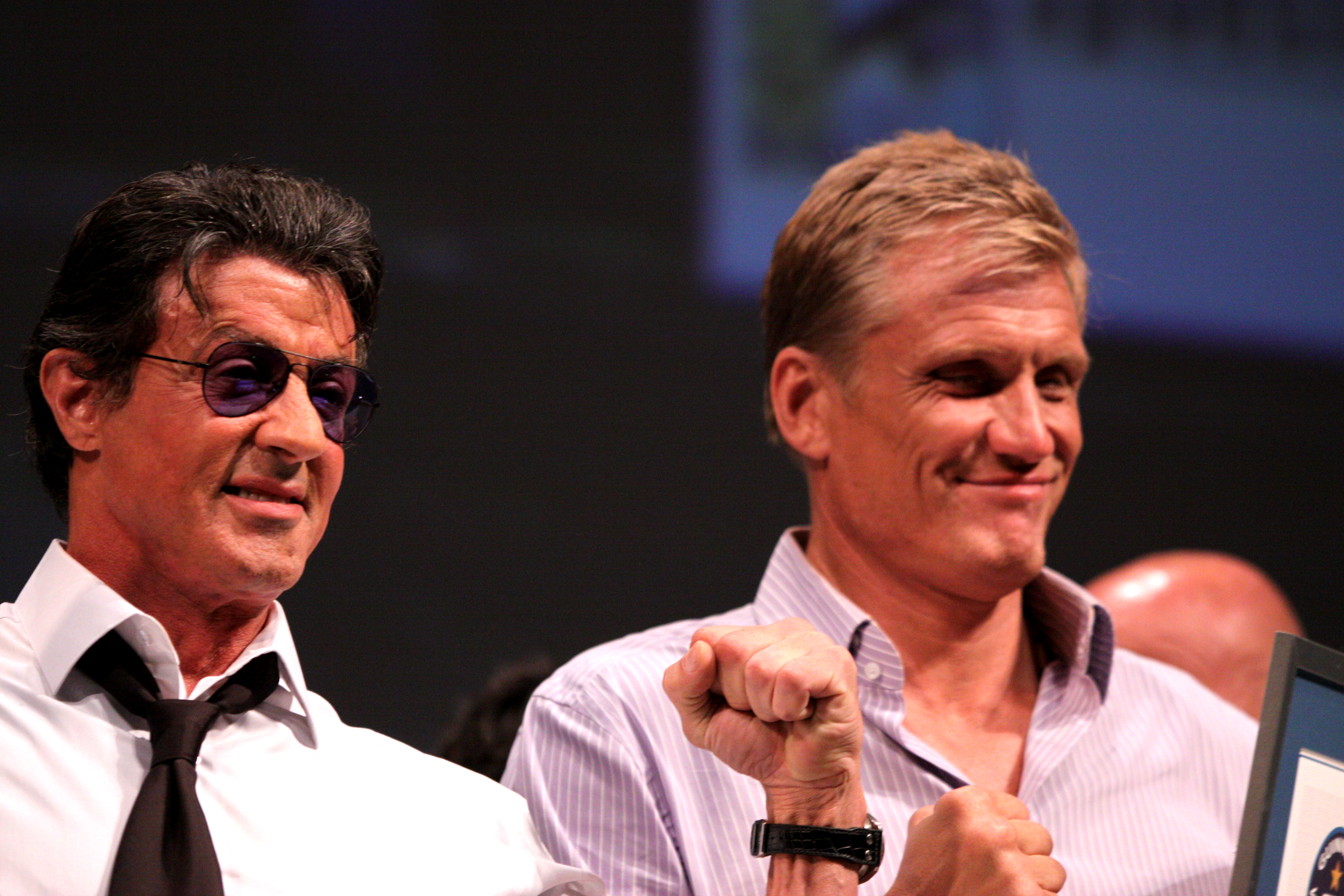
Sylvester Stallone & Dolph Lundgren portrayed characters Rocky and Drago whose rivalry was the subject of Rocky IV

Three's Company, an ABC sitcom that ran from 1977 to 1984 featured a blonde and brunette triangle. The blonde, Chrissy Snow, was played by Suzanne Somers and the brunette, Janet Wood, was played by Joyce DeWitt. Somers and DeWitt were continually faced with media stories that described both an on and off-screen "rivalry" between the two co-stars. Both women repeatedly denied the stories and attempted to dispel "the myth that women, especially blondes and brunettes, can't get along in Hollywood." This show was based on the British sitcom Man About the House, which likewise had brunette Paula Wilcox and blonde Sally Thomsett with Richard O'Sullivan as the man in the middle.

Blondes vs. Brunettes was an ABC TV special that was broadcast on May 14, 1984. Co-hosted by Joan Collins and Morgan Fairchild, the special was a light-hearted show illuminating the personality and lifestyle differences between blonde and brunette women. Time magazine characterized the special as a "showdown" between Collins, "…TV’s brunette meanie and Morgan Fairchild, 34, a blond TV vixen."

In 2010, season 14 of The Bachelor featured Jake Pavelka as the bachelor. CBS promotion for the show described it as ""Blondes vs. brunettes in the first sexy, barefoot football scrimmage in Bachelor history!" The brief football game followed a dinner held inside a mansion. Dividing the teams up evenly into blondes and brunettes was Pavelka's suggestion to the female contestants. Some critics were dismissive of the season premiere's set-up: "In what sounds like a 1962 frat boy's fantasy, it's soon a barefoot, evening attired brunettes versus blondes football scrimmage."

A 2016 Washington Post article highlighted the tension between blondes and brunettes in Hollywood productions saying, "In movies, blondes and brunettes often have to battle it out." In Cruel Intentions, a dark-haired Kathryn Mertueil (Sarah Michelle Gellar) spreads the rumor that her rival Annette Hargrove (Reese Witherspoon) has fake blonde hair. In Rocky IV, Rocky Balboa battles a Russian blonde nemesis named Ivan Drago. The Karate Kid features a male rivalry, with Johnny Lawrence, a wealthy, golden haired high school student as the dark-haired Daniel LaRusso's (Ralph Macchio) rival. In Tangled, the blond-haired Rapunzel takes revenge on her black-haired foster mother.

=== Dynasty ===
"The language of beauty is itself grounded in a language of dark and light that already sets women against each other in competition for male favor. One manifestation of this language is the appearance of dark/light pairs of women in which one is "dark" and the other, golden blond. From Pamela and Philoclea in The Countess of Pembroke's Arcadia, to Lucy and Mina in Dracula, to Joan Collins and Linda Evans in Dynasty, such pairings are ubiquitous in Anglo-American culture."

The word "catfight" dates back to at least 1854 when it was first used in a book written by Benjamin G. Ferris, discussing how women in the Mormon community would fight each other over shared husbands. A century later, in the 1950s and 1960s, catfights had become "A staple of fetish films and low-budget B movies, often with a blonde facing off against a brunette". By the 1980s catfights had been "Lifted out of pornography and put on network television, most notably on the nighttime soap opera Dynasty. In 1981, the first season of Dynasty was getting low ratings compared to Dallas, another nighttime soap and Dynasty's main competitor. So producers hired Joan Collins to play Alexis Carrington Colby, a brunette, who would fight with Linda Evans's character, Krystle Carrington, a blonde."

In her book Where the Girls Are: Growing Up Female with the Mass Media, American feminist and media critic Susan J. Douglas discussed how the catfight had become a "staple in American pop culture" by the 1970s, paving the way for Dynasty's success. Ratings for the show soared, as the viewing public became fascinated by what Douglas in her book called the "purest form" of a catfight: a blonde versus a brunette.

"Dynasty upped the ante. On one side was blond stay-at-home Krystle Carrington, the Mother Teresa of soaps, endlessly empathetic and supportive, always willing to listen and care, beloved by her servants. . . . In the other corner was the most delicious bitch ever seen on television, the dark haired, scheming, duplicitous, supremely self-centered and self-assured career vixen, Alexis Carrington Colby. Krystle just wanted to make her husband happy; Alexis wanted to control the world. How could you not love a catfight between these two?"

The show's producer, Douglas Cramer, responsible for introducing the idea of the two women having a "knockdown, drag out fight", claimed in later interviews, after the series run had ended, that everybody loved the catfights except Collins because "Linda was so much stronger than she was." In a 2023 interview, Collins confirmed that she hated the catfights because "... they were so stupid." Evans, by comparison, enjoyed the fights.

The Dynasty director's blueprint for the first fight was, according to Linda Evans, an "outrageous catfight" she had almost a decade earlier with brunette Stefanie Powers in the detective series McCloud, starring Dennis Weaver.

Nearly 30 years after the series ended British author Christopher J. Yates made reference to it in his highly regarded 2018 novel Grist Mill Road as Patrick, the principal narrator in the novel, described to readers how watching the fight between blonde Evans and brunette Collins led to his first erection.

"Mom let me stay up later than usual that night to watch Dynasty. We lay in the recliner together, her filling me in on the internecine squabbles of the various characters. What I remember most about that show ... was the scene in which two attractive women, one blond, one brunette, had a catfight in a lily pond. I stared wide-eyed at the TV as these vengeful beauties flailed at each other in the shallow waters of the pond, their expensive and low-cut gowns clinging to their numerous curves ... Yes, that was the moment, snuggled up against Mom's left hip, that my body decided to present me with the very first erotic stirrings of my life. I knew pretty much what it was, this stirring down below...So the shock I was experiencing wasn't fear of the unknown. No, it was the mortifying thought that my mom might notice my interest piquing. Which meant that, while trying not to move a muscle, trying not even to breathe, at the same time I desperately wanted to leap out of the armchair and run up to my room. That night in bed, and with some success, I tried mentally to recreate the frisson I'd experienced during the lily pond scene, going over it again and again in my head. Blond, brunette. Brunette, blond. And it was a tough choice but before too long I'd come down firmly on the side of the brunette."

=== Hammer films ===
While Hammer Films may be best known for gothic horror motion pictures, two of their productions revolved around a competition between blondes and brunettes.

==== One Million Years B.C. ====
"[In] the famous sci-fi epic One Million Years B.C. ... I played Loana, Queen of the Shell People and producer Michael Carreras had his heart set on a blonde. Yes, you heard right. She was the good girl. We know that because she was a blonde. There was also not-so-good girl, the Queen of the Rock People. She had to have black hair. When we had our famous girl fight it would be good against evil ... blonde against brunette." - Raquel Welch

Kari, queen of the brunette tribe, fights one of her blonde slaves in the 1967 film Prehistoric Women.

Although the movie includes a well-known fight scene between blonde Raquel Welch and brunette Martine Beswick, the primary aspect of the "rivalry" was the juxtaposition of a fair-skinned, intellectually superior, generous, peaceful, and compassionate tribe of blondes, of which Welch was a member; and a dark, primitive, self-centered, violent tribe of brunettes, of which Beswick was a member. One way of illustrating the differences between the two tribes was treatment of their dead: the blond "Shell" tribe buried a deceased member in a respectful ceremony; the dark "Rock" tribe left an injured old man to die in a ditch.

The confrontation between Welch as Loana and Beswick as Nupondi, occurred soon after Welch joined the Rock tribe, as a newly found mate of Tumak, played by John Richardson, arousing Beswick's jealousy. In a 1971 interview, Beswick said that the filming the fight sequence took a full five minutes while her and Welch fought in the dirt cave. A volcanic eruption at the film's climax inflicts a death toll on both the Rock and Shell tribes with the survivors banding together, hoping to build a peaceful future.

==== Prehistoric women ====
Prehistoric Women is a 1967 film scripted and directed by Michael Carreras who wrote the screenplay for One Million Years B.C. Carreras later told the media that he made the film for the sole purpose of re-using the sets and costumes that were used for that movie. Leveraging a confusing time-travel theme, big game hunter David, played by Michael Latimer, finds himself in a setting where everyone falls into one of three categories, "brunette women, blonde women, and men." David is soon held captive by evil queen Kari, played by Martine Beswick, who "... stars as a whip-toting queen of a lost tribe of dark-haired Amazon women who have enslaved the local race of blondes." Helping keep Kari in power is a native tribe that is periodically given one of the blondes as a reward. David refuses the romantic advances of Kari and instead allies himself with the blondes who he convinces to rise up against their oppressors. "A riot breaks out pitting blonde against brunette and as the battle thickens, Kari is killed by a charging white rhino." Reviews for the movie are largely negative, the film scoring a 0% on Rotten Tomatoes' "Popcornmeter". One film reviewer criticized the movie for "Courting the cliché that the blondes were the goodies when the brunettes were made to be baddies, a curiously prevalent misrepresentation that occurred in fantasies such as this..." Another said, "Aside from Betty and Veronica, Prehistoric Women shows the most blatant depiction of the blondes versus brunettes rivalry that I have seen in pop culture." Film critic Leonard Maltin described the movie as an "Idiotic Hammer Film in which the Great White Hunter stumbles into a lost Amazon civilization where blondes have been enslaved by brunettes. Honest! Nevertheless, it has developed a cult following due to Beswick’s commanding, sensual performance as the tribe’s leader."

=== Advertisements ===
Oglivy and Mather's 2006 poster for a French Scrabble tournament: "In Scrabble, anything is possible. Register for the grand national tournament."

In 2003, a Miller Lite television commercial, produced by Oglivy and Mather, played upon the rivalry by bringing back its "Great Taste/Less Filling" campaign in a controversial fashion. The campaign, titled "Catfight," featured "a blonde and a brunette fighting each other over why each drinks Miller Lite". During the fight, the women exchange blows in a fountain and lose much of their clothing, exposing significant cleavage on TV. The final scene has the women falling into a large vat of liquid concrete, analogous to a mud wrestling match. The ending of the commercial revealed the fight as a fantasy conjured up by two men drinking Miller Lite in a bar. A second commercial also featured a fight between a brunette Natalie Denise Sperl and a blonde, as well as a Spanish language commercial featuring a blonde and a brunette fighting at a soccer game.

Oglivy and Mather has long produced advertisements for the internationally renowned board game, Scrabble. A 2006 poster ad, directed at Francophone audiences, leveraged the rivalry between blondes and brunettes, by showing the numerical score for “blonde” as 9, compared to the score for brunette (“brune” in French) as 7. Adapting a movie poster from the 1957 film Reform School Girl with the blonde having the upper hand in a catfight, emphasized the higher score for the word "blonde". One variation of the poster provided a specific date for the tournament. The French website "La Meute", that tracked sexism in the advertising world, provide the following description of the advertisement:

"Drawing in contrasting colors, in the style of the forties, two women on the ground, dressed equally in a straight black skirt and a light blue top, one brunette, the other blond-red; same blood-red lipstick and same carnivorous teeth, same snarling and relentless expression. The blonde holds the brunette on the ground by pressing her body against hers and imprisoning her wrists in her hands. The brunette holds in her right hand, like a weapon, a pair of large, pointed and closed scissors. Below, Scrabble letters composing words, with the result: BLONDE 9-7 BRUNE Tagline: "In Scrabble everything is possible. Grand National Tournament on September 23, 2006." Comment: Beautiful young women are shown as hateful and violent rivals. Ready to hurt, to kill to win over the other, in a board game."

La Meute gave the advertisement the 2007 "Macho" award for sexism in advertising.

== Research and studies ==
=== 20th century ===
Marston, testing the physical reactions of blonde and brunette women.

Comparing and contrasting the physical and mental aspects of blondes and brunettes was well established in the early 20th century. Psychologist William Moulton Marston, who would later be instrumental in the devopment of polygraph machines, used a sphygmomanometer to measure and compare the blood pressure of blondes and brunettes when shown film clips of romantic movie scenes. Critics believed Marston, in the aftermath of Anita Loos' book and subsequent film Gentlemen Prefer Blondes, was "Capitalizing on the popular craze for speculating about the sexual temperament of women with different hair color." Marston's conclusion was that brunettes were more excitable than blondes, whose reaction to the film scenes was more detached. Although his work was widely ridiculed in the media, Hollywood producers saw value in the psychology of movies and Marston's works would influence movie scenes for decades. Later in life, Marston would create the comic enterpise Wonder Woman, whose various tools included a golden lasso that would force restarined people to tell the truth, a linkage back to Marston's efforts with polygraphs.

=== Contemporary ===
A 2008 study found that men in Greater London, England preferred dark haired women rather than women with blonde hair. A 2018 study based on University of Florida students found that men prefer brunette women over blonde women. These studies offered differing explanations for this preference. Worthham, et al. (2018) propose that stabilizing selection (preference for people with normal appearances) may be responsible for the male preference of dark-haired women. These authors noted that, while women from different geographic regions varied their preferences in male hair color, men did not vary in their preference for female hair color across regions. However Swami, et al. (2008) have posited that men may prefer women with dark hair because they are predominant in the fashion and modelling industries, or because they may be perceived as healthier or more fertile than blonde women.

In a 2012 interview with NBC News, Lisa Walker, chair of the sociology department at the University of North Carolina, explained that hair color "absolutely" plays a role in the way people are treated. A Cornell University study showed that blonde waitresses receive larger tips than brunettes, even when controlling for other variables such as age, breast size, height and weight.

The local NBC news affiliate in Charlotte tested Walker's theory by asking a natural blonde to walk around the Charlotte business area, drop a scarf and keep going. The volunteer did it 20 times as a blonde and then 20 times wearing a brunette wig. As a blonde, every time she dropped the scarf a bystander picked it up for her, but when wearing a dark-haired wig, people simply mentioned that the scarf was dropped or ignored it altogether, only occasionally picking the scarf up for her.

A well-publicized 2011 University of Westminster study, however, evaluated how men perceived women who entered a London nightclub as a blonde or a brunette. The study, published in the Scandinavian Journal of Psychology, used the same woman and had her dye her hair a different color for each visit. After spending some time in the club, she departed and then researchers entered the club and interviewed the men who had engaged her in conversation. The results showed that, as a blonde, she was more likely to be approached for conversation than as a brunette. However, when the researchers interviewed the men who spoke to her, the men rated her more intelligent and attractive as a brunette than as a blonde. Many news organizations covered the story as evidence that blondes were not preferred over brunettes.

In 2014 a study analyzed the experiences of blonde Swedish women who migrated to Singapore, a country with a large population of Chinese people. Swedish women were ranked below Chinese women in the female beauty hierarchy. According to the author, the blonde hair of Swedish women reduced their femininity, because it was racialized as a Western trait. The authors also noted that these women's Swedish husbands were highly attracted to local East Asian women, which further reduced the self-esteem of the blonde Swedish women.

In March 2016 a study by the Ohio State University was published in the Economics Bulletin. According to Jay Zagorsky, author of the study, the results show that: "the average IQ of blondes was actually slightly higher than those with other hair colors, but that finding isn't statistically significant." He adds: "I don't think you can say with certainty that blondes are smarter than others, but you can definitely say they are not any dumber."

Another study by the University of Tampa, which also used male and female students, found male students preferred brunette women over blonde women by 40%, while female students preferred brunette women over blonde women by 48%.

According to Lora Jacobi and Thomas Cash, it has also been shown that blonde women overestimated the percentage of men who would choose blonde hair as their ideal hair color. Among blonde women in their study, 92.9 percent rated blonde hair as ideal, with half believing that men would choose so as well. In reality, only 34.8 percent of men said they preferred women with blonde hair.

== See also ==
- Blonde stereotype
- Colorism
- Discrimination based on hair texture
- Human hair color
- Human skin color
- Melanin
- Prejudice and discrimination against redheads
