= Blonde stereotype =

Stereotypes of blond-haired people

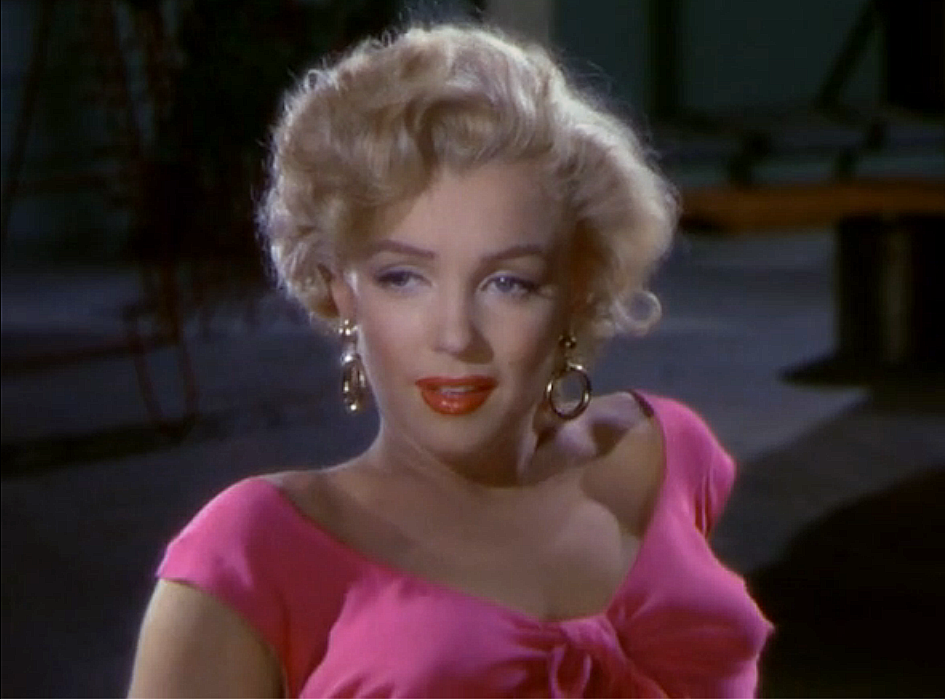
Stereotypes of blonde women were exemplified by the public image of Marilyn Monroe.

Blonde stereotypes are stereotypes of blonde-haired people, especially women, generally treating them as pretty but sillier and less clever than other people and often comparing them unfavorably to brunettes. Examples of this stereotype are the "blonde bombshell" and the "dumb blonde." Despite popular blonde jokes on these premises, research has shown that blonde women are not less intelligent than women with other hair colors.

The blonde bombshell is one of the most consistently popular female character types in cinema. Many Hollywood celebrities have used it to their advantage, including Jean Harlow, Marlene Dietrich, Marilyn Monroe, Jayne Mansfield, Brigitte Bardot and Mamie Van Doren.

== Background ==
There are several aspects to the stereotypical perception of blonde-haired women. A persistent stereotype takes men to find them more physically attractive than other women; Anita Loos popularized this idea in her 1925 novel Gentlemen Prefer Blondes. Some women have also reported that they feel other people expect them to be more fun-loving after they have lightened their hair, as an ad for Clairol hair colorant implies: "Is it true blondes have more fun?" Such stereotypes engender a view of blonde women as less serious or intelligent than others, reliant on their looks to succeed, which extends in Brazil to blonde women's disparagement as sexually licentious.

"Blonde jokes" reinforce the depiction of the "dumb blonde." Its origin may be traced to Europe, where a French courtesan named Rosalie Duthé was satirised in the 1775 play Les Curiosités de la Foire for her habit of pausing a long time before speaking, appearing not only stupid but literally dumb (mute). This stereotype has become so ingrained that it has spawned counter-narratives, as in the 2001 film Legally Blonde, in which a beautiful blonde woman overcomes prejudice aroused by her looks to succeed in Harvard Law School. However, a 2016 analysis of IQ data carried out by the National Longitudinal Surveys on a survey database of American "baby boomers" (NLSY79 data) found the natural blonde women in this demographic, which excluded the African American and Hispanic, to have a slightly higher mean IQ than brunette, black-, and red-haired women.

Alfred Hitchcock preferred to cast blonde women for major roles in his films, as he believed that the audience would suspect them the least, comparing them to "virgin snow that shows up the bloody footprints", hence the term "Hitchcock blonde".

== Typology ==
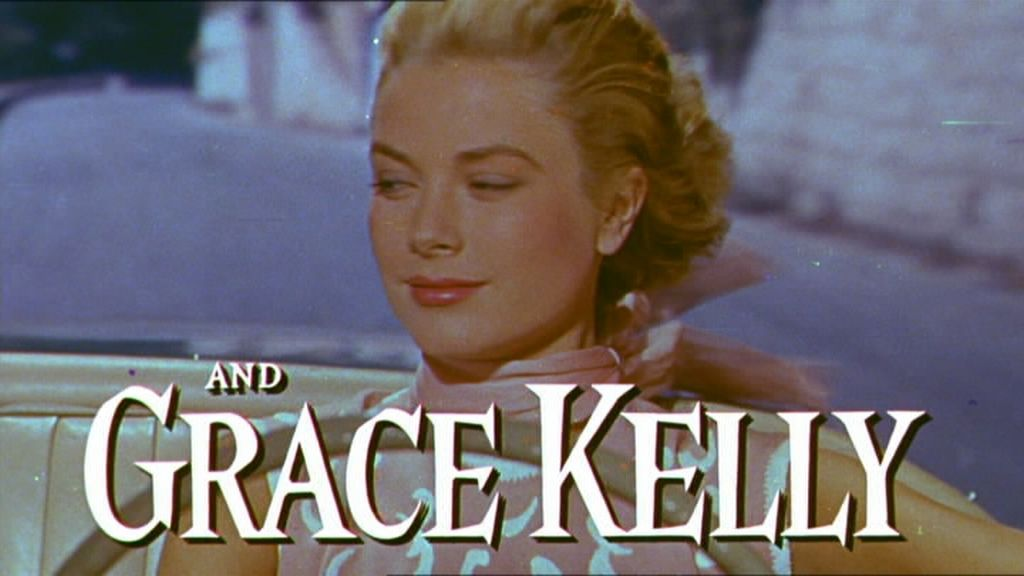
Grace Kelly, an ice-cold blonde, in To Catch a Thief (1955)

Annette Kuhn divides blonde stereotypes in cinema into three categories in The Women's Companion to International Film:

- The "ice-cold blonde": Kuhn defined it as "a blonde who hides a fire beneath an exterior of coldness". She provided Grace Kelly as an example. English actress Madeleine Carroll originated the role in Alfred Hitchcock's The 39 Steps (1935), with Kelly among those who would follow her.
- The "blonde bombshell": Kuhn defined it as "a blonde with explosive sexuality [who] is available to men at a price". She provided Brigitte Bardot, Lana Turner, Jean Harlow, Joan Blondell, Mae West, Barbara Eden, Marilyn Monroe, and Diana Dors as examples.
- The "dumb blonde": Kuhn defined it as "a blonde with an overt and natural sexuality and a profound manifestation of ignorance". She provided Jayne Mansfield, Marion Davies, Alice White, Marie Wilson, and Mamie Van Doren as examples.

In cognitive linguistics, the stereotype uses expressivity of words to affect an emotional response which determines a gender role of a certain kind. In feminist critique, stereotypes like the "blonde bombshell" or the "dumb blonde" are seen as negative images that undermine the power of women.

=== Blonde bombshell ===
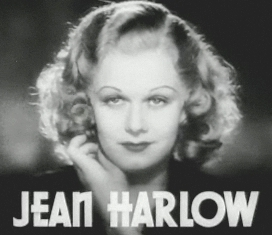
Jean Harlow, the original blonde bombshell, in Riffraff (1936)

The blonde bombshell is a gender stereotype that connotes a very physically attractive woman with blonde hair. A review of English language tabloids from the United Kingdom has shown it to be a recurring blonde stereotype, along with "busty blonde" and "blonde babe".

Jean Harlow started the stereotype with her film Bombshell of 1933. Following her, Marilyn Monroe, Jayne Mansfield and Mamie Van Doren helped establish the stereotype typified by a combination of curvaceous physique, very light-colored hair and a perceived lack of intelligence. In the 1950s, the blonde bombshell started to replace the Femme fatale as the mainstream media stereotype. Marjorie Rosen, a historian of women in films, says of the two top blonde bombshells of the time that "Mae West, firing off vocal salvos with imperious self-assurance, and Jean Harlow, merchandising her physical allure for the masses, transformed the idea of passive female sexuality into an aggressive statement of fact".

=== Dumb blonde ===
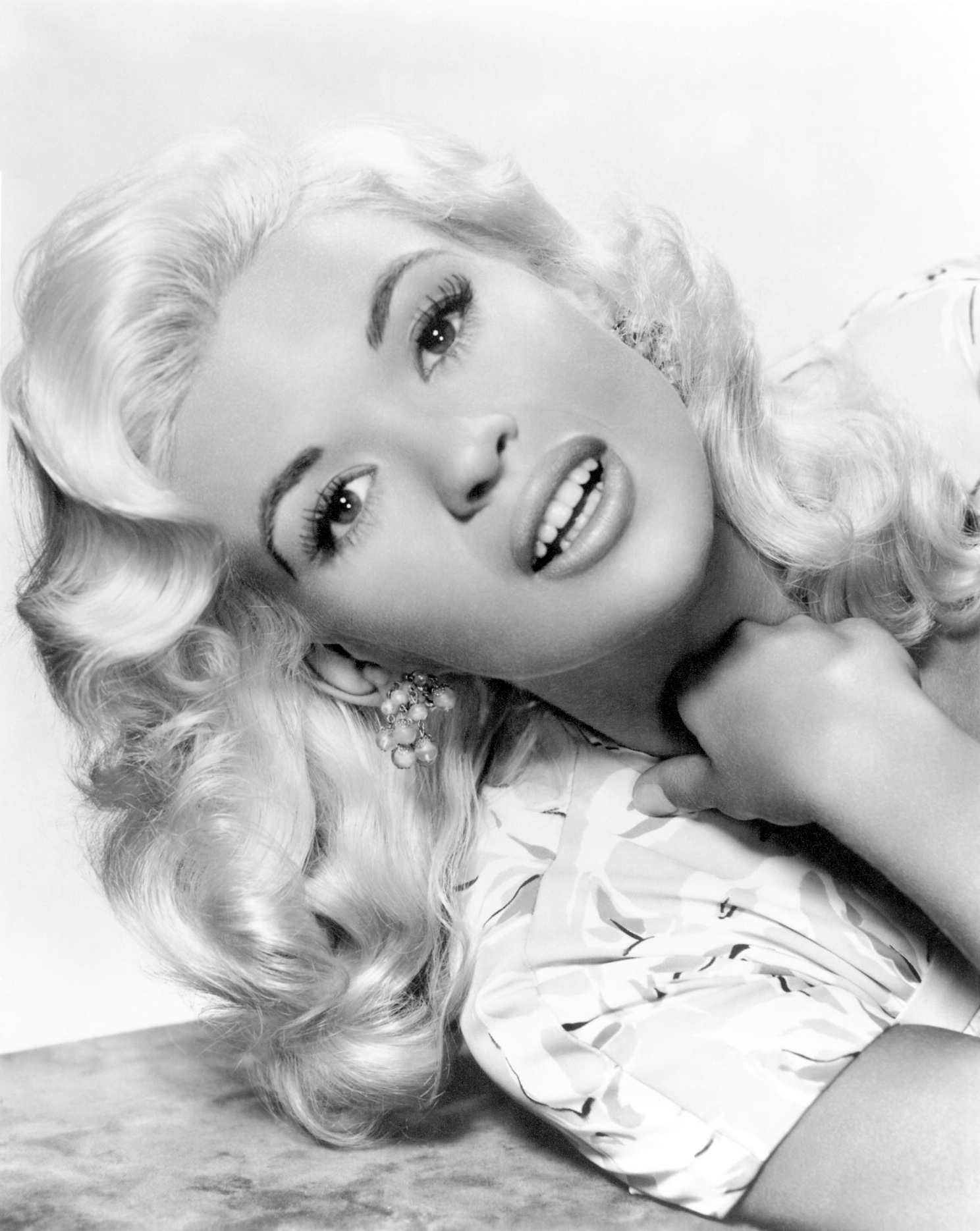
Jayne Mansfield in the 1957 film Kiss Them for Me. She modeled her image as a highly memorable "dumb blonde" persona.

The notion of "dumb blonde" has been a topic of academic research reported in scholarly articles and university symposia, which tend to confirm that many people hold to the perception that light-haired women are less intelligent than women with dark hair. It is believed the first recorded "dumb blonde" was an 18th-century blonde French courtesan named Rosalie Duthé whose reputation of being beautiful and dumb, even in the literal sense of not talking much, inspired a play about her called Les Curiosités de la Foire (Paris 1775).

While there is no evidence that suggests that blondes are less intelligent than other people, it has been suggested earlier that the state of being blonde probably creates opportunities that do not require investing in education and training. A possible earlier hypothetical explanation is that physically attractive women have less pressing incentives to cultivate and demonstrate their intellect to ensure their future, since physical attractiveness is an asset, or correlatively that intelligent women have less pressing incentives to dye their hair to a presumed attractive color. The purported validity of this explanation is purely hypothetical and has been corroborated earlier by its applicability to a similar pervasiveness of the "dumb athlete" stereotype.

At the same time, newer data have shown that natural blondes have the highest IQ among white women, which is already explained by the scientists as possible greater incentive to intellectual activity in the place where the blonde grew up, which directly refutes the earlier suggestion that blondes have less intellectual incentives. The dumb blonde stereotype, and the associated cognitive bias, may have some negative consequences and it can also damage a blonde person's career prospects.

Gentlemen Prefer Blondes (1925) by Anita Loos originated as a comic novel and explores the appeal of blonde women. It spawned a musical on Broadway, and two films released in 1928 and 1953. The Encyclopedia of Hair describes Marilyn Monroe's blonde role in the second film as that of "a fragile woman who relied on her looks rather than on intelligence—what some people refer to as 'dumb blonde'". At the same time, in the film she demonstrates a certain amount of wit regarding her life position expressed in the song "Diamonds Are a Girl's Best Friend". Madonna emulated that screen-persona of Monroe in her music video Material Girl.

Many blonde actresses have played stereotypical "dumb blondes", including Monroe (dyed blonde), Judy Holliday, Jayne Mansfield (dyed blonde), Carol Wayne and Goldie Hawn. Goldie Hawn is best known as the giggling "dumb blonde", stumbling over her lines, especially when she introduced Rowan & Martin's Laugh-In "News of the Future". In the American sitcom Three's Company the blonde girl (originally Chrissy, played by Suzanne Somers, and later Cindy and Terri) is sweet and naïve, while the brunette (Janet, played by Joyce DeWitt) is smart.

Juxtaposing "smart brunettes" with "dumb blondes" is a long standing Hollywood stereotype, as seen in this 1982 magazine cover.

Entertainment magazines have leveraged the dumb blonde stereotype as part of their cover articles. Rona Barrett's Hollywood magazine used the phrase "Blondes vs Brunettes" on a 1978 cover addressing Hollywood's typecasting of blondes as dumb and brunettes as smart. Us Magazine's October 26, 1982 edition featured a cover story titled "Brains Vs. Blondes: Goodbye, T&A! Hello IQ! The 'boob tube' cleans up with a bevy of smart but sexy brunettes". Stefanie Powers, Veronica Hamel, Michele Lee, Debbie Allen, Erin Gray. and Stephanie Zimbalist were among the brunettes interviewed for the article. Shelley Long, one of two blondes interviewed for the article, said "I'm capable of playing dumb blondes who sometimes know more about life than women who are all locked into their heads." Susan Sullivan, also blonde, said "if a man doesn't seem to take me seriously because I'm a blonde, I just show him my roots."

== Blonde jokes ==
There is a category of jokes called "blonde jokes" that employs the dumb blonde stereotype. It overlaps at times with other jokes that portray the subject of the joke as promiscuous and/or stupid. Some blonde jokes rely on sexual humour to portray or stereotype their subjects as promiscuous. Many of these are rephrased sorority girl or Essex girl jokes, much as other jokes about dumb blondes are based on long-running ethnic jokes.

Many of these jokes are mere variants on traditional ethnic jokes or jests about other identifiable groups (such as Italian jokes involving Carabinieri, Sardarji jokes or Pathan jokes). Similar jokes about stereotyped minorities have circulated since the seventeenth century with only the wording and targeted groups changed.

Blonde jokes have been criticized as sexist by several authors, as most blondes in these jokes are female, although male variations also exist. Dumb blonde jokes are overwhelmingly female-specific: according to an extensive search in various publications and on the Internet, about 63% of dumb blonde jokes are directed exclusively at women, compared to less than 5% that directly referenced dumb blonde men.

Research indicates that because of this, men report being amused by blonde jokes significantly more than women do. The fact that most of these jokes target the invariably dim-witted, and sexually promiscuous, women makes them even more sexist. In the 20th century, a class of meta-jokes about blondes (i.e. jokes about blonde jokes) has emerged. In a typical plot of this type, a blonde complains about the unfairness of the stereotype propagated by blonde jokes, with a punch line actually reinforcing the stereotype.

== Blondes versus brunettes ==
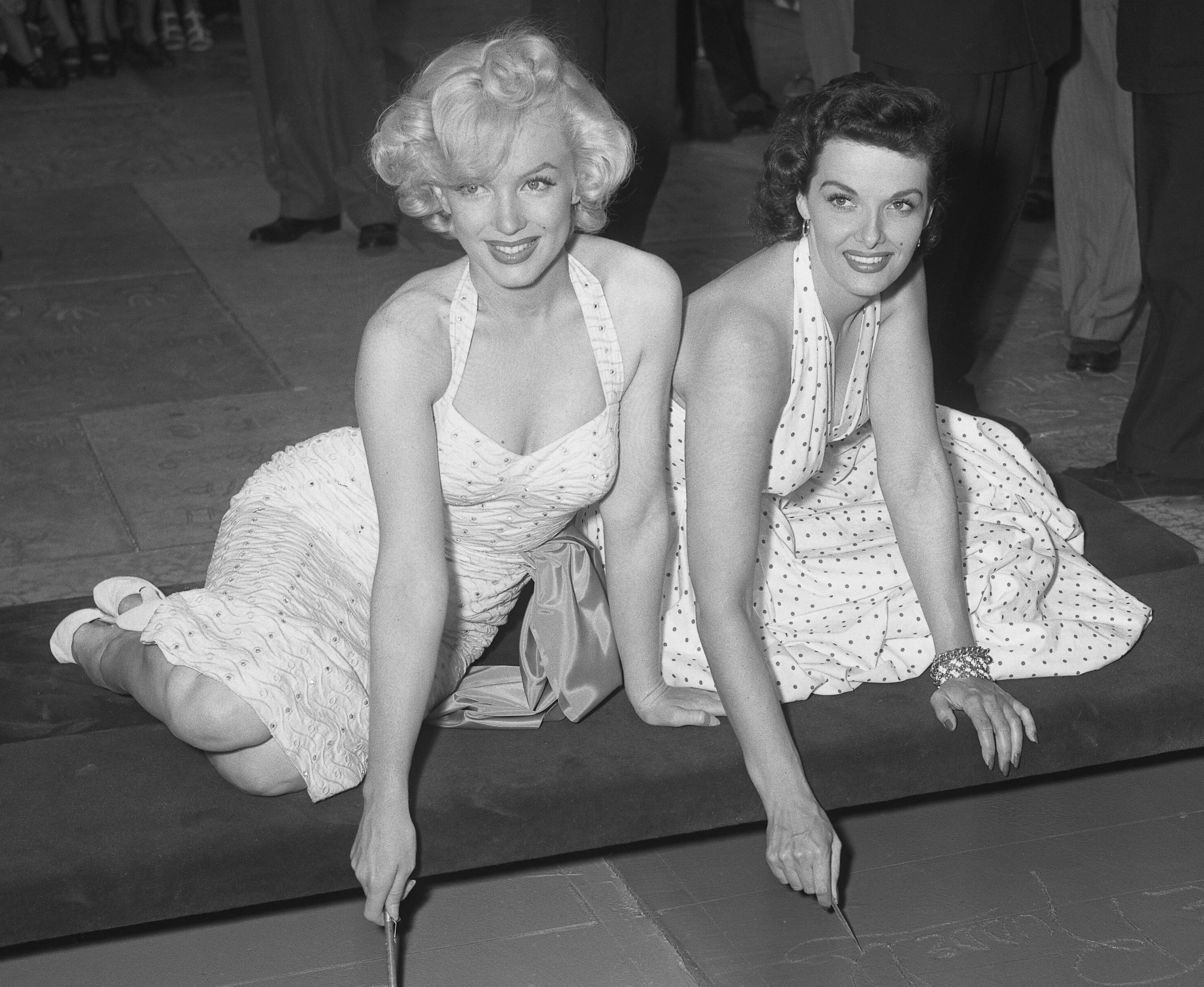
Gentlemen Prefer Blondes (1953) starred Marilyn Monroe (left) as the blonde and Jane Russell (right) as her wise brunette friend.

In a November 2011 article titled "Blondes vs. Brunettes: TV Shows with Betty and Veronica-Style Love Triangles", media critic Tucker Cummings cited several TV shows that featured a "classic war between blonde and brunette love interests", including The Office, where lighter-haired Pam Beesly competes with brunette Karen Filipelli for the attention of Jim Halpert, Suits, where blonde Jenny Griffith competes with brunette Rachel Zane for the attention of Mike Ross, and Dexter, where blonde Rita Bennent and brunette Lila West compete for the affections of Dexter Morgan, the main character. She wrote, "... the blonde (is) stable, and typifies the 'girl next door,' while (the) ... brunette, is haughty, and a bit more exotic."

In Archie comics, Betty Cooper and Veronica Lodge have been engaged in a mostly friendly competition for over 70 years.

A number of studies have been conducted over the years to measure society's attitude toward blondes and brunettes. Wortham, et al. have shown that more men find brunettes more physically attractive. A 2009 Cornell University study showed that blonde waitresses receive larger tips than brunettes, even when other variables, such as age, breast size, height and weight, are controlled for.

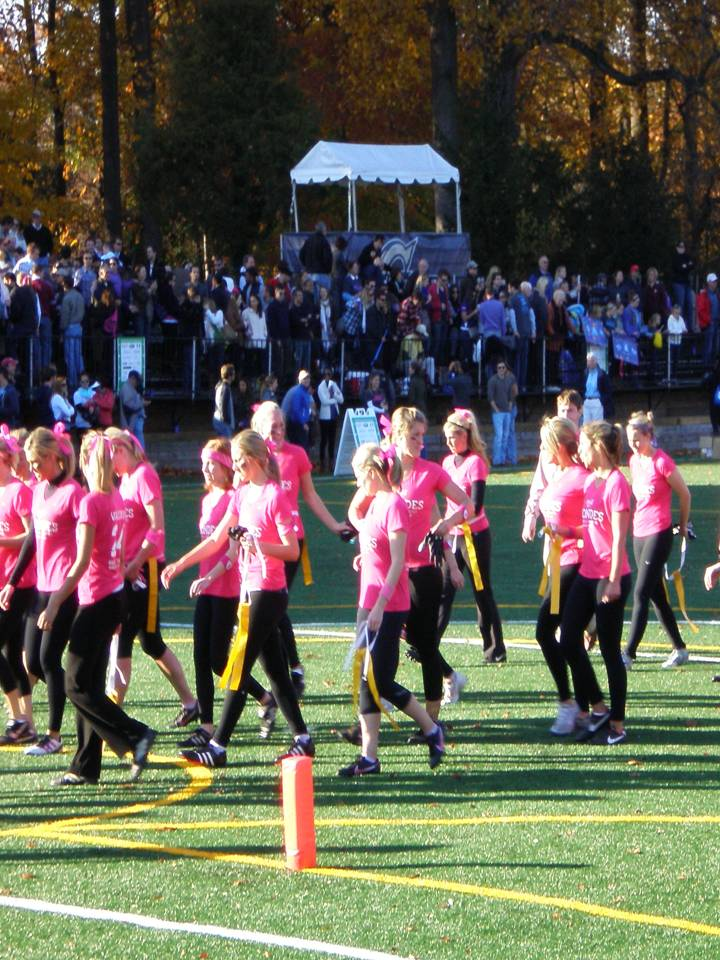
Team Blonde at the 2011 Blondes vs. Brunettes Powder Puff Football Game in Washington D.C.

In a 2012 interview with NBC News, Lisa Walker, Sociology Department Chair at the University of North Carolina said that hair color "absolutely" plays a role in the way people are treated and claimed that numerous studies had shown that blonde women were paid higher salaries than other women. In a 1996 study by Diana J. Kyle and Heike I. M. Mahler, the researchers asked subjects to evaluate photographs of the same woman with "natural" (not dyed) looking brown, red, and blonde hair in the context of a job application for an accounting position. The researchers found that the blonde-haired applicant was rated as significantly less capable than her brunette counterpart. In addition, participants designated the female applicant's starting salary as significantly lower when she was depicted as a blonde than when she was shown with brown hair.

A 2006 study that looked at the CEOs of the Financial Times Stock Exchange's (FTSE) top 500 companies investigated how hair color could be a potential barrier to professional success. In a 2001 study by Brian Bates, two sets of MBA graduates were given the same Curriculum vitae of the same women split between two sets of attached photos - blonde and brunette. The brunette was considered more for a managerial position and for a higher salary.

A 2011 University of Westminster study evaluated how men perceived women who entered a London nightclub as a blonde or a brunette. The study, published in the Scandinavian Journal of Psychology, used the same woman and had her dye her hair a different color for each visit. The results showed that, as a blonde, she was more likely to be approached for conversation than as a brunette. However, when the researchers interviewed the men who spoke to her, the men rated her more intelligent and physically attractive as a brunette than as a blonde.

In contrast to the image of swarthy, dark-haired Latin Americans, many such actors and actresses, both in Latin America and in the U.S., have blonde hair, blue eyes, and/or pale skin.

== Counter representation ==
At the same time, there are many examples where the stereotype is exploited only to be combatted. The film Legally Blonde, starring Reese Witherspoon, featured the stereotype as a centrepiece of its plot. However, the protagonist turns out to be very intelligent and is shown to have been underachieving in conformance with society's low expectations of her.

The singer Dolly Parton, aware of this occasional characterization of her, addressed it in her 1967 hit "Dumb Blonde". Parton's lyrics challenged the stereotype, stating "just because I'm blonde, don't think I'm dumb 'cause this dumb blonde ain't nobody's fool". Parton has said she was not offended by "all the dumb-blonde jokes because I know I'm not dumb. I'm also not blonde."

The author of the comic strip Blondie, Chic Young, starting with "Dumb Dora", gradually transformed the titular character into a smart, hard-working, family-oriented woman.

== Blonde men ==
Nazi propaganda idealized Nordic Aryan Herrenmensch as blonde, blue-eyed, athletic, and tall. This stereotype was imitated in Soviet World War II films, with the Germans played by Estonians, Latvians and Lithuanians.

== See also ==
- Prejudice and discrimination against redheads

== Sources ==
- Encyclopedia of Hair: a Cultural History, by Victoria Sherrow, Greenwood Publishing Group, 2006, ISBN 0-313-33145-6
- Stephanie Ann Smith (1 January 2006). Household words: bloomers, sucker, bombshell, scab, nigger, cyber. U of Minnesota Press. p. 74. ISBN 978-0-8166-4553-4.
