= Shugli–Jugli =

Indian stand-up comedy duo

- Born: Shugli (Gurpreet Singh); Jugli (Prabhpreet Singh); Punjab, India
- Other name: Shugli Jugli
- Employer: Doordarshan

Comedy career
- Years active: 1988–present
- Medium: Stand-up, Television
- Genre: Comedy

Shugli–Jugli (formerly known as Santa Banta), also known as Shugli Jodi, is a stand-up comedy duo consisting of brothers Shugli and Jugli. The team is primarily known for comedy. It has been associated with Doordarshan since 1988 and has appeared in eight hundred uncertain double act shows, including in Bangkok, Singapore and Toronto.

In 2015, the two changed their original stage name following indecent Santa Banta-related social media content posted under their names that allegedly targeted specific minority communities such as Sikhs.

== Background ==
Santa (now Shugli) was born Gurpreet Singh and Banta (now Jugli) was born Prabhpreet Singh in Punjab, India. Santa Banta is a character originally created by Khushwant Singh, an Indian author. The duo became known as Santa Banta in 1997 or earlier when a producer asked the team to choose it as stage name.

== Career ==
The two started their professional career in 1988 on the Doordarshan comedy programme Sandali, and later in 1995, they appeared on the TV programmes Raunak Mela, Lara Lappa, and Bach Ke Mod To . In 2000, they created 104 short episodes after a production company was formed by Banta, the younger brother. They were also assigned by the government to perform in TV shows during the 1984 anti-Sikh riots under the government security.

== Controversies ==
The duo changed its stage name after they were criticised for being responsible for practicing sardarji jokes during stand-up shows, leading to numerous social media posts of offensive content under their names.

In 2016, the Shiromani Gurdwara Parbandhak Committee filed a petition to the Supreme Court of India to prohibit people from posting Santa Banta-related content online. Later in 2017, the Supreme Court delivered its verdict and declined to formulate constitutional guidelines against the petition, citing "the courts cannot lay down moral guidelines for citizens".
