= Claude-Jean-Baptiste Hoin =

French painter

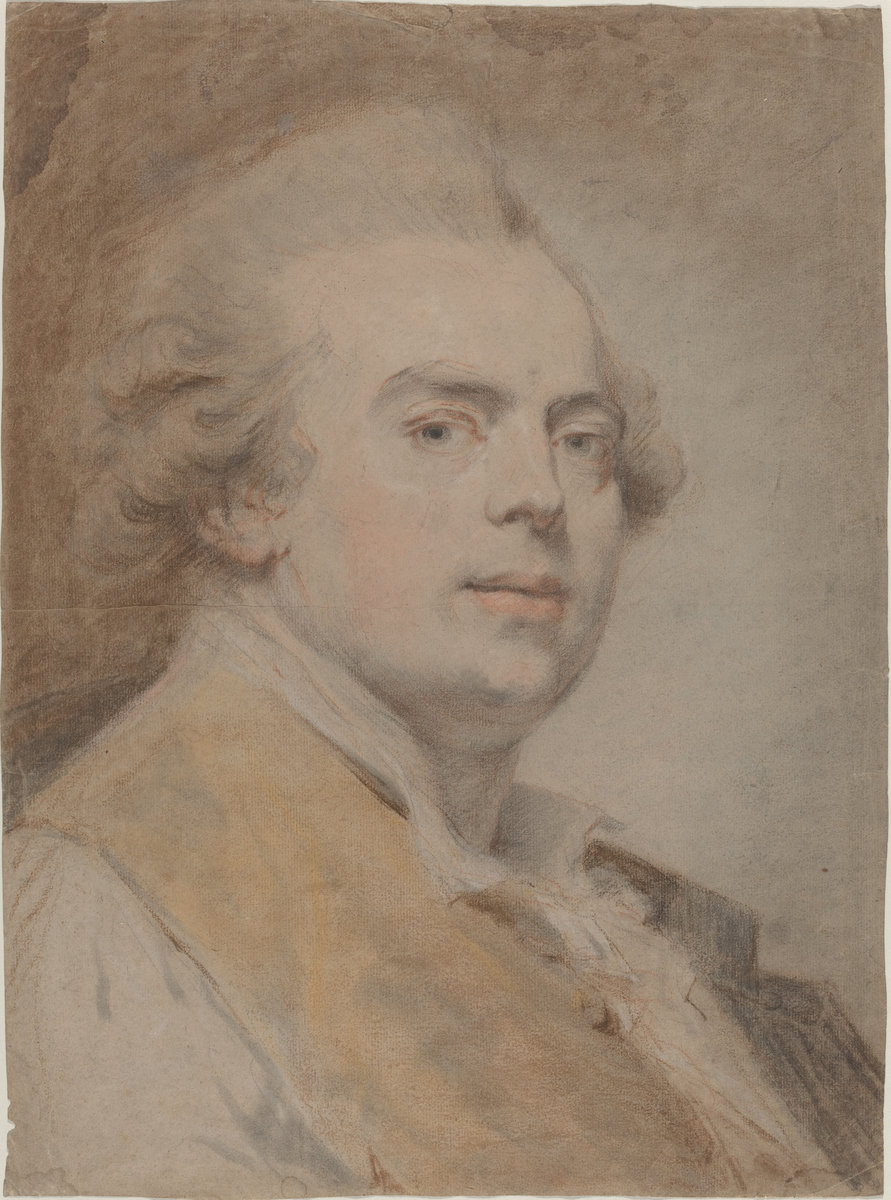
Self portrait of the artist, c. 1780, at the National Gallery of Art

Claude-Jean-Baptiste Hoin (5 June 1750 – 16 July 1817) was a French artist known primarily for his portraits and landscapes.

He worked in pastels for his portrait miniatures, and in gouache and engraving for his landscapes. He studied with François Devosge and Jean-Baptiste Greuze. He was a member of the Academy of the Sciences and Literature of Dijon (1776) and an honorary associate of the Royal Academy of Painting of Toulouse.

His works include a self-portrait in pastel (1787), and the portraits Mirabeau (1790), Guyard (1786), Madame Dugazon (ca. 1878), and a presumed portrait of Rosalie Duthé. He is also noted for a pair of pastel portraits of the maternal grandmother and aunt of Octave de Rochebrune, which he signed as peintre de Monsieur, frère du roi ("painter of Monsieur, brother of the king"). These are noted for an ease of execution and the masterly lightness and transparency given to the sheer fabrics.

Hoin died in Dijon, his birthplace.

== Gallery ==
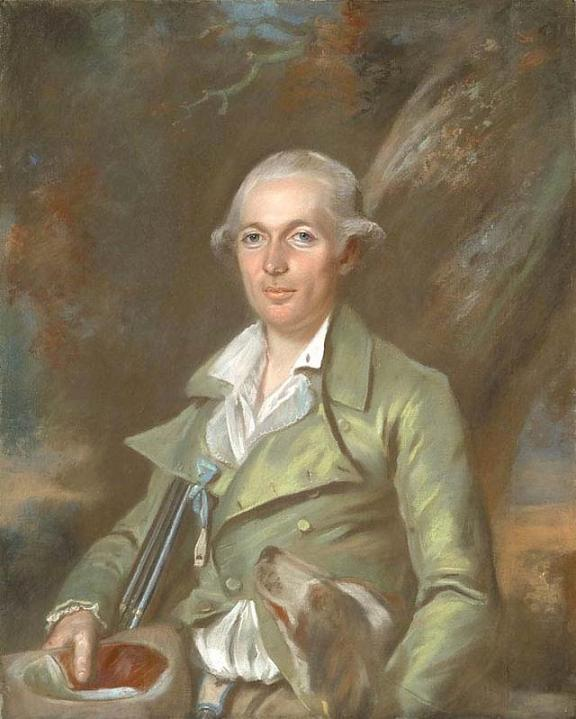
Portrait of Claude de Choiseul

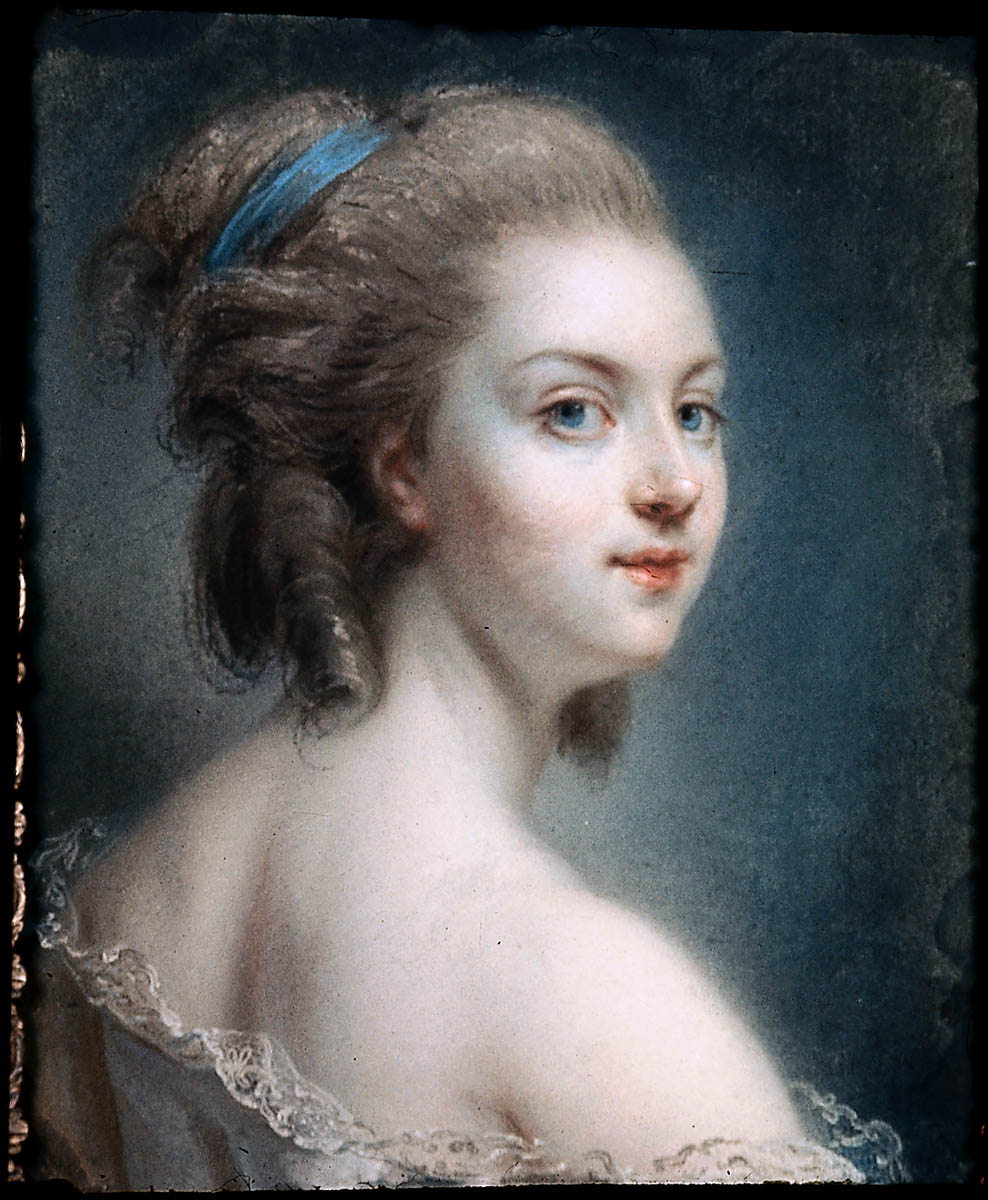
Presumed Portrait of Rosalie Duthé, Museum of Fine Arts, Boston

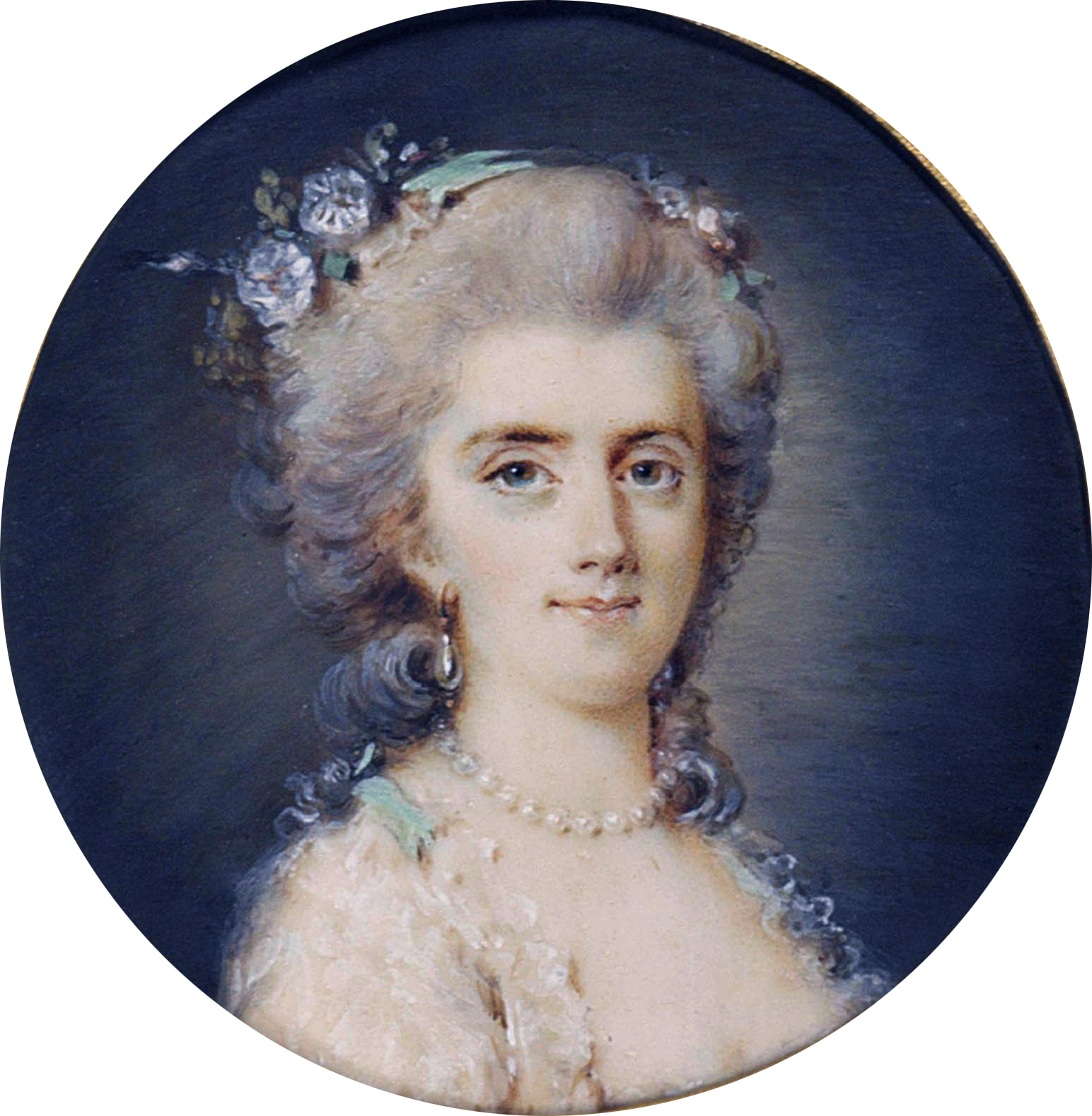
Portrait of Diane de Polignac

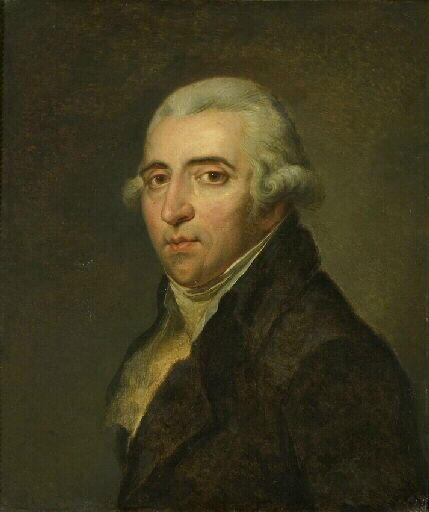
Portrait of François-Jacques Hoin
