= Pathan joke =

Derogatory joke about Pashtun people

A "Pathan joke" is a derogatory joke that is typically centered around ethnic stereotypes about Pashtun people. The word "Pathan" (as opposed to the endonym "Pakhtun") is a Hindi word and it refers to Pashtuns or people who have Pashtun ancestry. Pathan jokes are controversial and are often considered racist, offensive or inappropriate by many in Pakistan and India..

"Pathan" jokes may be generic "stupid naive ignorant" character jokes, or may particularly reference stereotypes of aggression and non-cooperation, or may be generic "dirty" jokes: in these jokes the "Pathan" character is considered to be extremely promiscuous and sexually active.

== See also ==
- Hindu joke
- Sardarji joke
