= Rosalie Duthé =

French courtesan

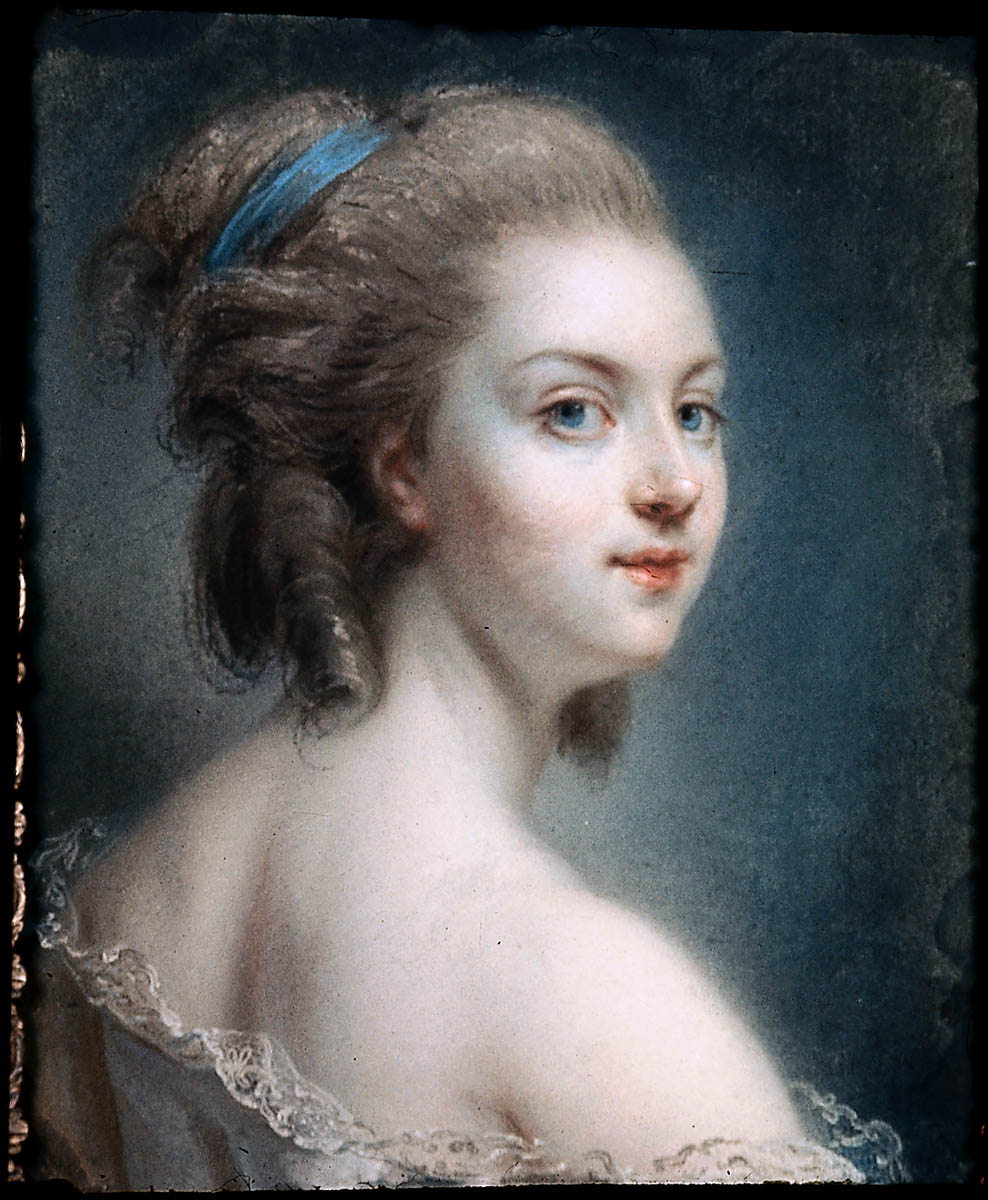
- Presumed portrait of Rosalie Duthe, Claude-Jean-Baptiste Hoin (1750–1817)
- Born: Catherine-Rosalie Gerard Duthé; 1748
- Died: 1830 (aged 81–82)
- Resting place: Père Lachaise Cemetery, Paris
- Occupation: Courtesan

Catherine-Rosalie Gerard Duthé (1748–1830), (Note: Duthe's birth date is given as 1748–1752 in various sources. Duthe's death date is given as 1820, 1830 and 1831 in various sources. The dates of 1748–1830 are used here, as given in the Encyclopedia of Prostitution and Sex Work.) alternately Duthe or Du The, was a celebrated French courtesan. A companion of French kings and European nobility, she has been called "the first officially recorded dumb blonde." Duthé was a frequently requested subject for portraits, including partial and full nudes, many of which still exist in museums and private collections.

== Biography ==
After quitting a French convent, Duthé became the mistress of wealthy English financier George Wyndham, 3rd Earl of Egremont (1751–1837), "whom she is said to have ruined." She then became a dancer at the Paris Opera Ballet, and the companion to various noblemen, including the Duc de Durfort, the Marquis de Genlis, and the young Comte d'Artois, the future Charles X of France. In an incident around 1788, Louis Philippe II, Duke of Orléans, presented Duthé to his 15 year-old son Philippe (later King Louis Philippe I) to "learn some facts of life." When she was later seen in Philippe's royal carriage on the Champs-Élysées, some young aristocrats took offense, as normally only princes rode in royal carriages; they sang a song set to a popular tune using the lyrics "La Duthé a dû téter", roughly translated as "La Duthé must have suckled royally."

In Parisian society, Duthé developed a certain "reputation by adopting the habit of pausing for extended periods of time before speaking." She appeared not only stupid, but dumb in the literal sense. This inspired a one-act satire about her called Les Curiosités de la Foire (Paris 1775) that "kept Paris laughing for weeks." The play apparently distressed Duthé so much that she promised to kiss anyone who restored her honor; the offer went untaken. Although the origin of the stereotype of the dumb blonde is not entirely clear, cultural historian Joanna Pitman has noted that "Rosalie Duthé acquired the dubious honour of becoming the first officially recorded dumb blonde."

Duthé was the supposed author of an autobiography, Galanteries d'une Demoiselle du Monde ou Souvénirs de Mlle. Duthé (1833), though it has been claimed the real author was Baron Lamothe-Langon, who had known Duthé personally.

Rosalie Duthé died in 1830, probably around the age of 82. She is buried at Père Lachaise Cemetery.

== In art ==
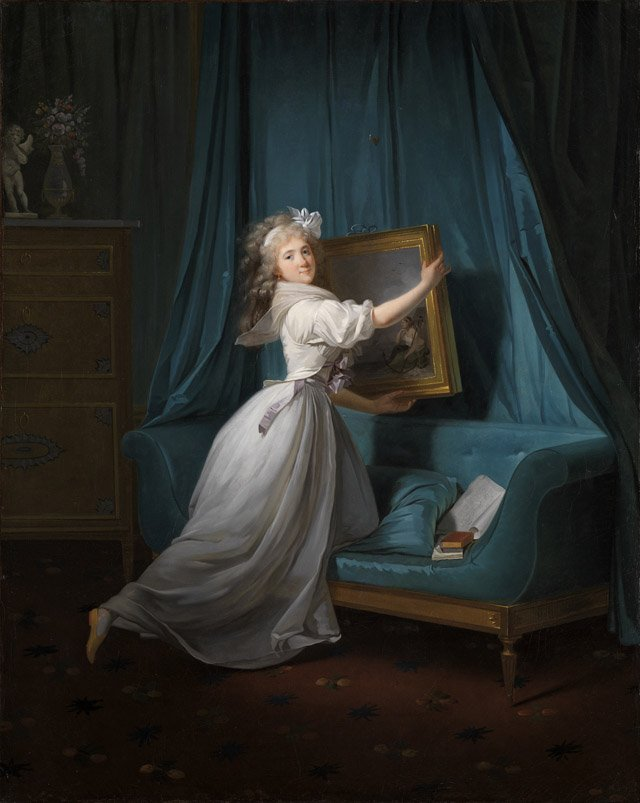
Danloux's Mademoiselle Rosalie Duthé (1792)

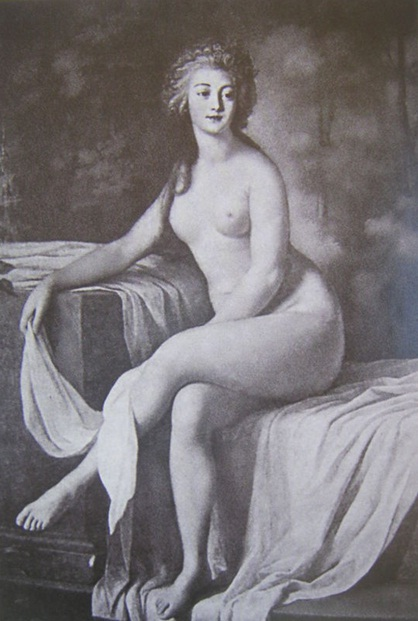
Rosalie Duthé by Lié Louis Périn-Salbreux

Duthé was often requested by portrait painters for sittings, including for partial and full nudes. She was painted by François-Hubert Drouais in 1768, for a full-length portrait now held by the English branch of the Rothschild family. Salbreux-Perin, better known as a miniaturist, made at least five portraits of Duthé, including a nude of her sitting modestly at the end of her bath that was intended for the bathroom of the Comte d'Artois at Bagatelle. Another shows her lying naked on her bed, hair disheveled, now among the collections of the Museum of Fine Arts, Rheims. Antoine Vestier (1740–1824) painted the nude Portrait of Rosalie Duthé (c. 1780).

Henri-Pierre Danloux (1753–1809) was Duthé's favorite artist, and he recorded some of his sessions with her in his diary. Danloux painted a number of portraits, including Mademoiselle Rosalie Duthé (1792), commissioned by Duthe's friend and banker Jean-Frédéric Perregaux, who is said to have contemplated this image on his death-bed. Claude-Jean-Baptiste Hoin (1750–1817) painted Presumed portrait of Rosalie Duthé (date unknown).

Other painters who made portraits include Jean-Honoré Fragonard, Pierre-Paul Prud'hon and Jacques-Antoine-Marie Lemoine. Among the sculptors who created busts of her are Jean-Baptiste Defernex and Jean-Antoine Houdon. Élisabeth Vigée-Lebrun painted Portrait of Mademoiselle Rosalie Duthé (1776), but she never took Duthé as a model and the painting is now considered a copy of someone else's portrait.
