= Alzheimer's Association =

Non-profit American health organization

- Formation: 1980; 46 years ago
- Founder: Jerome H. Stone
- Type: Non-profit organization
- Headquarters: Chicago, Illinois, U.S.
- Board Chair: Minoo Javanmardian, Ph.D.
- Website: www.alz.org

The Alzheimer's Association is a nonprofit voluntary health organization that focuses on Alzheimer's disease care, support, research, and outreach.

== History ==
Jerome H. Stone founded the Alzheimer's Association with the help of several family support groups after meeting with the National Institute on Aging in 1979. Stone's efforts began in 1970 when his wife was first diagnosed with Alzheimer's. During the 1970s, there was very little information available about the disease, and only a few support groups existed at the time. Stone joined with seven independent groups that wanted to form a national organization. The groups consisted of researchers, physicians, caregivers, and other humanitarians. Together, they held their first meeting on December 4, 1979, to discuss solutions for the need for Alzheimer's information and care and a cure for the disease.

The Alzheimer's Disease and Related Disorders Association was incorporated on April 10, 1980. In that year, the National Institutes of Health (NIH) invested $13 million in Alzheimer's disease research. In 1982, President Ronald Reagan designated the first National Alzheimer's Disease Awareness Week.

The Association affirms has chapters in communities across the nation, with its home office located in Chicago and a public policy office in Washington, D.C.

In January 2023, Joanne Pike succeeded Harry Johns as Association president and CEO, becoming the first woman to hold these positions in the organization's history.

== Events ==
=== Alzheimer's Association International Conference ===
Held annually, the AAIC is the largest international meeting for the advancement of dementia science and clinical practice. Participants share breaking research discoveries and clinical practice education, aiming for improvements in diagnosis, risk reduction and treatment of Alzheimer's disease and other dementia.

=== Walk to End Alzheimer's ===
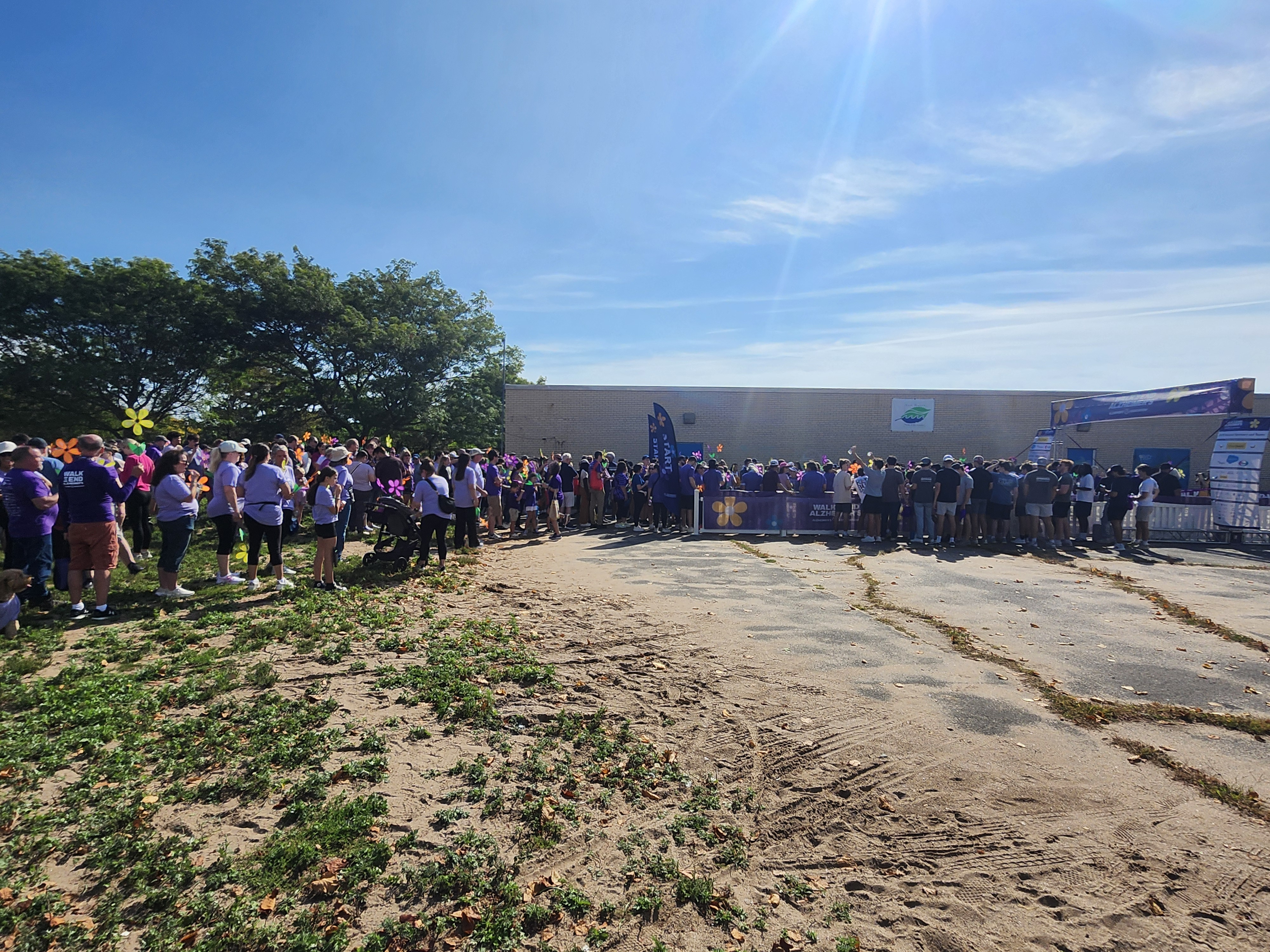
Start line at the 2025 East Haven Walk to End Alzheimer's

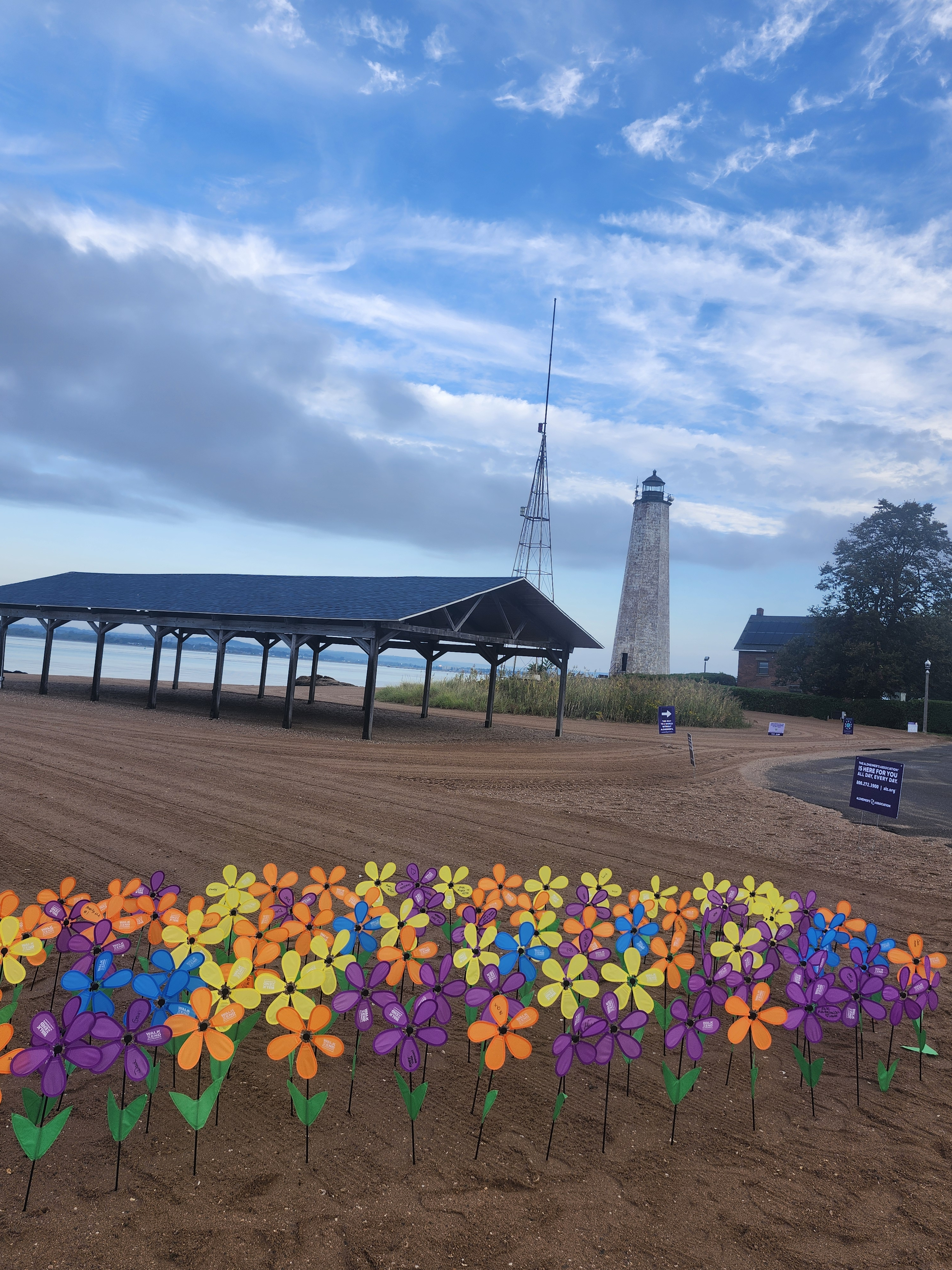
The flowers symbolize whether they have lost someone to Alzheimer's (Purple), are a caregiver for someone with Alzheimer's (Yellow), have Alzheimer's (blue), or are a supporter for the cause against Alzheimer's (orange).

Held annually in more than 600 communities nationwide, the Alzheimer's Association Walk to End Alzheimer's is a fundraiser for Alzheimer's care, support, and research. Participants are encouraged to raise critical funds that allow the Alzheimer's Association to provide 24/7 care and support and advance research toward methods of prevention, treatment, and, ultimately, a cure. Walk participants will often carry a flower that symbolizes whether they lost someone to Alzheimer's, are a caregiver for someone with Alzheimer's, have Alzheimer's or support the fight against Alzheimer's.

=== Do What You Love to End ALZ ===
Do What You Love to End ALZ is a fundraiser that starts with participants doing something they love to benefit the care, support, and research efforts of the Alzheimer's Association. Formerly called The Longest Day, the event was rebranded in 2025.

=== Ride to End Alzheimer's ===
The Alzheimer's Association Ride to End ALZ is a cycling event for fundraising and public awareness about Alzheimer's disease, aimed at occasional cyclists and enthusiasts.

=== RivALZ ===
RivALZ powder puff football is a charity event that raises both awareness of Alzheimer's disease as well as money for the Alzheimer's Association. The first game of “rivals” was in 2005 and used society’s blonde vs. brunette rivalry as the basis for competition. Aided by attention grabbing media headlines such as “Blondes Battle Brunettes at the Cotton Bowl”, the annual event spread to more than 20 cities. In 2014 the games were re-branded as “RivALZ” allowing teams to form more traditional rivalries such as north vs south or city vs suburb.

== Publications ==
The Alzheimer's Association publishes Alzheimer's & Dementia, an open access and peer-reviewed journal that also provides the research and patient community with a collaborative forum.

In June 2024, it published "Revised criteria for diagnosis and staging of Alzheimer's disease", advocating a shift from diagnosing Alzheimer's symptomatically to testing for the presence of amyloid plaques. This approach is widely respected among researchers as it incorporates validated biomarkers in diagnosis and recognizes Alzheimer's as a disease that begins years before dementia develops. It is however controversial, as older adults can carry amyloid plaques without ever developing symptoms.

== Alzheimer's Impact Movement ==
The Alzheimer's Impact Movement (AIM) is a separately incorporated 501(c)(4) advocacy affiliate of the Alzheimer's Association. AIM works to secure policies to overcome Alzheimer's and dementia, including increased investment in research, improved care and support, and development of approaches to reduce the risk of developing dementia. Working at the federal and state level, AIM advances the public policy priorities of the Alzheimer's and dementia community.

== Alzheimer's Impact Movement Advocacy Forum ==
The Alzheimer's Impact Movement (AIM) Advocacy Forum is an annual gathering that takes place in the spring in Washington, D.C. The multiday event includes training sessions, celebrity guests, the National Alzheimer's Dinner, and topical presentations focusing on Alzheimer's disease policymaking and legislation. The feature of the event is a lobby day during which volunteer attendees conduct meetings with members of Congress on Capitol Hill.

== Center for Dementia Respite Innovation ==
The Alzheimer's Association, in conjunction with the U.S. Department of Health and Human Services is distributing a $25 million grant to local organizations to provide and improve respite care for dementia patients. These grant distributions aim to promote innovative approaches for providing vare for dementia patients.
