= Grist Mill Road =

2018 novel by Christopher J. Yates

- First edition (US)
- Author: Christopher J. Yates
- Language: English
- Publisher: Picador (US); Headline Publishing Group (UK)
- Publication date: 2018
- Publication place: United Kingdom
- Pages: 352
- ISBN: 978-1-250-15028-8

Grist Mill Road is the second novel by English author Christopher J. Yates published in 2018 by Picador.

== Plot ==
In 1982, three teenagers are involved in a crime in a forest 90 miles north of New York City. Hannah (the rich daughter of a cement dynast) is tied to a tree, Matthew shoots her with a Red Ryder BB Gun and she loses an eye. Patrick (Patch) is secretly watching, counting the shots over 40 times, and he thinks that Matthew had killed her. Later Patrick returns and finds that Hannah is still alive, unties her, and brings her back to the town where she is taken to hospital. Then Matthew is convicted and sent to prison. But Hannah believes Patrick is totally innocent.

In 2008 New York City Patrick is married to Hannah in a luxury apartment overlooking Times Square in New York City. Patrick believes he should have prevented Matthew's attack on Hannah, for which he feels guilty. He has lost his job at a bank in the depression and now writes a cooking blog. Patrick feels paranoid and depressed; then he notices a proposal sent to his blog by an unknown admirer. Intrigued by the offer, he discovers it was sent by Matthew who wants to clear the air with Patrick and help him establish a restaurant in the countryside.

In a series of flashbacks, narrated by Matthew, it is revealed that prior to shooting Hannah she had seen him engage in a homosexual act with an older man. She confronts him at his house and accuses him of being a homosexual himself. Matthew’s father overhears the conversation and threatens to kill her, but doesn’t. Enraged that his son might be gay, Matthew’s father takes him for a walk in a nearby forest, gun in hand. Believing that his father is going to kill him, Mathew smashes a rock into his father’s head and forces his body off a cliff, killing him. Later, he confesses to Hannah that he killed his father.

Later, Matthew armed with a BB gun, Hannah and Patrick are in the woods. Patrick walks away, uncomfortable with being part of the threesome. Agreeing to play a Houdini-like game of escape, Hannah allows Patrick to tie her up to a tree. Once she is tied up, he attempts to have sex with her but she fights back. Angered by her refusal and blaming her for his father’s death, he grabs the BB gun and begins shooting Hannah.

It is 2008 and Hannah has discovered that Patrick was a witness to the shooting, something he has never told her. Patrick has convinced himself that Matthew is responsible for her discovering the truth and creating a rupture in their marriage. He also believes that Matthew is responsible for his being fired. Certain that Matthew wants Hannah for himself, while they are scouting rural sites for the restaurant, Patrick smashes a rock into Matthew’s head, the same type of rock Matthew used to assault his father before killing him. When Matthew regains consciousness, he discovers that he is tied up with rope. At gunpoint, Patrick forces him into the trunk of his car and drives him to the tree where Matthew had tied up Hannah many years earlier.

Hannah deduces that Patrick wants to kill Matthew. She leads police to the scene of the shooting decades earlier where they find Patrick holding a shotgun to Matthew who is tied up to the same tree. Ignoring poilice commands to drop the gun, Patrick shoots Matthew, killing him. In turn, Patrick is shot in the chest by the police. Patrick dies in Hannah’s arms.

== Reception ==
- Publishers Weekly writes that this is "an edgy, intelligent thriller that explores the aftermath of a senseless crime...The reader’s sympathies shift as each character brings a different perspective to the events that shaped them. Unexpected twists keep the tension high.
- Kirkus Reviews is also positive: "Much of the book explores the ways in which they individually struggle to come to terms with and exorcise guilt before the past can destroy their present and future happiness. If this sounds complicated, it is—humanly complicated and narratively complicated—but successfully and movingly so. Yates manages to take a brutal incident and, by the end, create understanding for all three major characters involved: the victim, the perpetrator, and the witness. By doing so, he drives home the messages that truth is always subjective and that true, compassionate love is always redemptive. It's the compassion part, he argues, at which most of us tend to fail. Mesmerizing and impossible to put down, this novel demands full attention, full empathy, and full responsibility; in return it offers poignant insight into human fragility and resilience."
- Catherine Russell in PopMatters explains that "Grist Mill Road is a complicated story with many layers. The characters are complex, and most of them are wonderfully human (which of course means deeply flawed). The story details too many problems and issues to list—including but certainly not limited to the far reaching impacts of violence. Still, the notion of 'watching' is the idea I keep returning to. In a society where reality television and social media often dominate, where cell phone videos of just about everything appear online, the idea of what it means to watch takes on new meanings. Grist Mill Road is a book that provides ample opportunities to explore what some of these new meanings might be.
- Dennis Drabelle from The Washington Post praises Yates: "who was born and raised in England and now lives in New York City, set his first novel, Black Chalk, mostly in his homeland. This time around, he demonstrates impressive knowledge of and affection for his adopted country while telling an even more compelling tale. Not least among his new book's strengths is the light it sheds on the phenomenon of an otherwise law-abiding male giving in to volcanic rage.
