= Christopher J. Yates =

American novelist

Christopher J. Yates is a British-American fiction writer and the author of three novels, Black Chalk (2013), Grist Mill Road (2018), and The Rabbit Club (2025). Black Chalk was first published in the UK by Harvill Secker in September 2013 and in the US by Picador in August 2015. In December 2015, NPR named Black Chalk one of the best books of the year. Grist Mill Road received a Kirkus Star and praise from The New York Times for a narrative "full of pleasantly unpleasant surprises."

On December 8, 2023, Publishers Weekly announced that Hanover Square Press had acquired Yates’ third novel in a preempt. Set in the same "Black Chalk" Oxford universe with overlapping characters and Easter eggs, The Rabbit Club—out July 8, 2025—has been called "tantalizing" for "dark academia fans" who "ought to snatch this up." In a starred review, Library Journal praised "The Rabbit Club" as "gripping, thought-provoking literary fiction," and People magazine called it "a mind-warping dark academia gem." On July 25, 2025, Yates published a piece in the Wall Street Journal, "How I Became an Accidental Author of ‘Dark Academia,’" revealing that "Black Chalk" had gone into its 19th printing.

Yates was born in Bromley in London, England on February 4, 1972, and graduated from Wadham College at Oxford University with a law degree in 1993. He currently resides with his wife in New Paltz, NY, and also wrote restaurant reviews for the Hudson Valley edition of the Times Union.

On November 19, 2024, Yates released a puzzle book, called "5 Minute Murder: 100 addictive crime mystery puzzles for logical sleuths."
