= Sardarji joke =

Class of jokes about Sikhs

Sardarji jokes or Sardar jokes are a class of religious jokes based on stereotypes of Sikhs (who use the title of "Sardar", with -ji being an honorific). Although jokes about other religious, ethnic, and linguistic communities are found in various regions of India, Sardarji jokes are the most widely circulated religious jokes and are found across the country. Sardarji jokes are generally considered tasteless and inappropriate by members of the Sikh community, and have elicited protests as well as leading to arrests for hurting religious sentiments.

== Origin ==
Some of the dominant traits of the Sardar jokes include the Sardar being shown as naïve, inept, unintelligent, or not well-versed with the English language. Many of the Sardar jokes are variations of ethnic jokes or stereotype jokes. Some of them also depict Sardarjis as witty or using other people's stereotyped perceptions against them.

The researcher Jawaharlal Handoo associates some traits of the Sardar jokes with the stereotype of Sikhs being associated with jobs where physical fitness is more important than knowledge of the English language or intellect. He also states that "In my opinion, the 'success-story' of the Sikh-community as a whole has taken the form of a deep-rooted anxiety in the collective minds of the non-Sikh majorities especially the Hindus of India....Sikhs are a very prosperous and successful people ....this may have threatened the Hindu ego and created anxiety, which in turn seems to have taken the form of various stereotypes and the resultant joke cycle." Soumen Sen states that these jokes perhaps reflect the anxiety of the non-Sikh Indian elite, who may have suffered from a sense of insecurity due to the growing competition from the enterprising Sikhs.

Some of the Sardar jokes, self-deprecatory in nature, were made up by the Sikhs themselves. In The Other Face of India, M. V. Kamath wrote about "the Punjabi's enormous capacity to poke fun at himself, a trait that seems peculiar to the Punjabi, especially the Sikh." In his book President Giani Zail Singh, the Sikh author Joginder Singh states "...who can enjoy a good joke against himself or against his tribe except a Punjabi and more particularly, a Sikh?"

== Joke cycles ==
Santa and Banta are two popular names for the stock characters in the Sardar jokes.

A category of Sardar jokes is the "12 o'clock jokes, " implying that Sikhs are in their senses only at night. Preetinder Singh explains the origin of the "12 o'clock joke" as follows: The real reason for the association of "12 o'clock" with Sikhs comes from Nadir Shah's invasion of India. His troops passed through Punjab after plundering Delhi and, killing hundreds of thousands of Hindus and taking hundreds of women as captives. The Sikhs decided to attack Nadir Shah's camp and free the captive women. Being outnumbered by Nadir Shah's huge army, they could not afford to make a frontal attack. Instead, they used to make midnight guerrilla raids on Nadir Shah's camp, free as many captive women as possible, and return them to their homes.

In jest, the Hindus would say that the Sikhs are in their senses only at night. This later became the trait of a widespread category of derisive jokes. Singh opines: "Hindus started referring to the relatively neutral 12 o'clock, rather than midnight" to avoid annoying the armed Sikhs, and the "final result was the safe, bald statement, 'It is 12 o'clock' shorn of all reference to its very interesting history.....When Hindus crack this joke, they are oblivious to the fact that had the Sikhs not intervened, their womenfolk would have been dishonoured and taken into exile".

== Reaction from the Sikh community ==
=== Protests by Sikh groups ===
In recent years, there have been several cases of Sikh groups protesting against the Sardarji jokes. In Folk Narrative and Ethnic Identity: The 'Sardarji' Joke Cycle, Jawaharlal Handoo notes that the Sikh members in a group generally do not seem to enjoy a Sardarji joke, although they may pretend to enjoy the humour of the joke by smiling or joining the group laughter.

In 2005, some Sikhs protested against a scene in the Pritish Nandy Communications (PNC) film Shabd. In the scene, Zayed Khan tries to cheer Aishwarya Rai by telling a Sardarji joke. As he begins the joke with the words "There was a Sardarji", Aishwarya starts giggling. A group of angry Sikhs stormed the PNC office, and demanded that the scene be deleted from the film.

An organisation called The Sikh Brotherhood International wrote letters to the PNC, the Central Board of Film Certification, and the National Commission for Minorities (NCM), saying that the film had hurt the sentiments of the Sikh community. The Pritish Nandy Communications Limited tendered a written apology, stating that they respect the Sikh community and hold it in high esteem, and they had no intention of ridiculing anybody. The Censor Board issued directions to delete the objectionable scenes in the film.

=== Complaint by National Commission for Minorities ===
On February 25, 2005, journalist Vir Sanghvi wrote a column in Hindustan Times, saying that the NCM was curbing free speech on behalf of the "forces of intolerance", while claiming to fight for minority rights. He wrote that the Sardarji joke is part of the "good-natured Indian tradition", and not an example of anti-minority feeling. He pointed out that the best Sardarji jokes are told by the Sikhs themselves, presenting Khushwant Singh as an example. He further went on to say that the protesters should develop a sense of humour and that "All truth has the power to offend. Take away the offence and you end up suppressing the truth". Research has indicated however that suggesting truth in such stereotypes in ethnic jokes is not supported by facts which are contrary to this suggestion.).

On March 2, 2005, The NCM filed a complaint against the Hindustan Times with the Press Council of India, stating that "the tone, tenor and the content of the article in question has a tendency to hurt the sentiments of Sikh community." The Hindustan Times responded by stating that the article was not aimed to ridicule the Sikh community in any manner, and was a criticism of the NCM, justifiable under the right of free speech under the Constitution of India. The NCM decided not to proceed with the matter, and the case was closed as withdrawn.

=== Complaints to police and court cases ===
Though some jokes were created by the Sikhs themselves, now it has gone out of hand.

— P. S. Pasricha, the second Sikh police commissioner of the Mumbai Police.

In March 2007, around 25 Sikh youths from Sikh Media and Culture Watch (SMCW) demanded arrest of Ranjit Parande, a Matunga-based book seller, for stocking the Santa and Banta Joke Book, a collection of Sardarji jokes. Based on a complaint filed by a Sikh businessman, the Mumbai Police arrested Parande under section 295 of the Indian Penal Code, for "hurting religious sentiments." The SMCW members alleged that several of the Sardarji jokes border on the obscene, and have begun to have a demoralising effect on the Sikh youths.

They later requested the cyber cell department of the Mumbai police crime branch to "ban jokes on the internet" which portray Sikhs as objects of ridicule. Swaranjit Singh Bajaj, the vice-president of SMCW, blamed the Sikh humorists such as Navjot Singh Sidhu and Khushwant Singh for perpetuating the stereotypical image of Sikhs. Khushwant Singh, a Sikh author who has included several Sardarji jokes in his joke books, received a notice from the secretary of SGPC in 2004, asking him to desist from hurting the sentiments of the community. Singh also received similar notices from some Marwari organisations, the Shiv Sena and the RSS. However, he continued to include Sardarji jokes in his subsequent joke books. In the preface to his 7th joke book, he claimed that most of his Sardarji jokes were "pro-Sardarji".

In December 2007, India's second biggest mobile operator Reliance Communications and its head Anil Ambani were charged by Lucknow police with "insulting a religion or faith", after Reliance sent a Sardarji joke as its "joke of the day". Many Sikhs in Meerut staged violent protests. The joke originated from the website santabanta.com, and was supplied to Reliance by OnMobile, a third party supplier. Reliance stated that it was not responsible for content provided by OnMobile, but apologised its subscribers and the Sikh community in Uttar Pradesh. OnMobile also issued a public apology.

In 2013, Atul Kumar was arrested in Jalandhar for texting offensive Santa-Banta jokes, under Section 295 (A) and IT Act.

== See also ==
- Hindu joke
- Pathan joke
