= Black Chalk =

2013 novel by Christopher J. Yates

- First edition
- Author: Christopher J. Yates
- Cover artist: James Jones
- Language: English
- Publisher: Harvill Secker 2013 (UK); Picador 2015 (US)
- Publication place: United Kingdom
- Media type: Print

Black Chalk is the debut novel by English author Christopher J. Yates published in 2013 by Harvill Secker. It was named a 'Best Book of the Year' by NPR in 2015. Set between the University of Oxford and New York City where the author both studied and where he now lives.

== Plot ==
The story has two main threads, the first set in fictional Pitt College at the University of Oxford in 1990 and the second set in Manhattan 14 years later. The main protagonists are Chad — a shy American exchange student — and the charismatic Jolyon, who become friends at Oxford and also gather in Emilia, Dee, Mark and Jack. The six become embroiled in a game of dares and consequences, with the enigmatic Tallest, Middle and Shortest members of the Game Soc policing the game and enforcing its rules — 10,000 pounds is the cash prize. One by one the players lose, resulting in one of their deaths. The remaining two members, Chad and Jolyon meet up again 14 years later in New York to decide on the winner....

== Reception ==
Dennis Drabelle writing in The Washington Post enjoyed the premise: "A circle of bright college friends who feed on one another's cleverness and trump one another's insults until the steady diet of cynicism ends in tragedy - this is the stuff of two fine first novels: Donna Tartt's The Secret History (1992) and, now, Christopher J. Yates's Black Chalk. Yates's characters are even wittier than Tartt's, but then, as undergraduates at Oxford University, they would be, wouldn't they?" and concludes that "Like a locked-room mystery, a boarding-school or college novel reduces the world to a compartment filled with quasi-incestuous conflict. By adding gamesmanship and mental illness to the mix, Yates has achieved something new and impressive."

Marcel Berlins also praises the novel: "Black Chalk is an inventive and intricate psychological puzzle thriller that mystifies, torments, disturbs, beguiles and occasionally irritates...A touch pretentious, in parts overcomplicated, Black Chalk is nevertheless a powerfully intelligent debut for Christopher J. Yates."

Jason Sheehan in NPR praises Yates "who writes like he has 30 books behind him; like he's been doing this so long that lit games and deviltry come to him as natural as breathing...This is the smart summer thriller you've been waiting for. The black and harmful little book you want in your carry-on. The novel you should be reading tonight. Because The Game never really ends. It's out there, just waiting for you to make the first move."

Kirkus Reviews is generally impressed: "Yates’ unreliable narrator makes the story a puzzle in itself, and while frustrating, it’s all fun and games…right? Parts of this story are downright unrealistic, you won’t get much character development, and key elements are left unexplained, but if you’re in this for the game, you’ll leave satisfied. You can’t help but admire how Yates slowly unravels his players’ safety nets—their minds—one roll of the dice at a time."
