= RivALZ (charity event) =

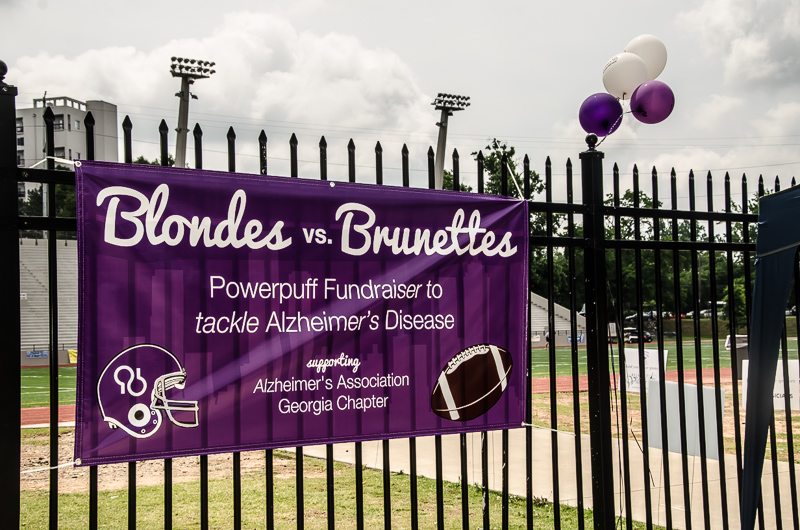
Game banner for 2014 Blondes vs Brunettes powderpuff football game

RivALZ is a powderpuff football game played in cities across the United States. Proceeds from the event are donated to The Alzheimer's Association. Games have been held in more than 40 cities and have cumulatively raised more than $18 Million for the care, support and research efforts of the Association.

== History ==
=== Blondes vs brunettes ===
The annual contests were started by Sara Allen Abbott whose father, Texas State Representative Joseph Hugh Allen, died of Alzheimer's disease in 2008. Looking for a way to raise funds for the Alzheimer's Association, Abbott organized a powder puff football game in tribute to her father, a lifelong football fan. Abbott, who was working and residing in Washington, D.C. at the time, wanted a more hands-on fundraiser in comparison to the many charitable organizations which were raising money predominantly through formal black-tie events. Alongside her sister, she thought a powder puff football game that leveraged pop culture's blonde vs. brunette rivalry would be more appealing to a younger set of donors with a $20 ticket price to provide a low-cost way for attendees to support a good cause.

In Fall 2005, the first blonde vs. brunette powder puff football game was played at Hains Point in Washington, D.C. and raised $10,000. Subsequently, the game searched for a more suitable home and moved around the Washington D.C area before settling in at George Washington University’s Mount Vernon Athletic Field in 2009. Since its inception, the game has received considerable publicity to include feature articles in The Washington Post and has raised over $500,000 in the Washington, D.C. alone.

By 2012, Blondes vs. Brunettes Powderpuff Football was being played in cities across the United States and each city has a slightly different approach to the game. “In Washington, the rivalry is intense. If friends are on opposite teams, they usually don't talk the weekend of the games," Abbott shared. Cities that host the game include: Albany, Amarillo, Akron, Atlanta, Austin, Bakersfield, CA, Baton Rouge, Boston, Buffalo, Charlotte, Burlington, IA, Chicago, Cincinnati, Cleveland, Columbia, SC, Columbus,Denver, Evansville, Houston, Hudson Valley (New Rochelle, NY), Indianapolis, Jackson, Kansas City, Lexington, Los Angeles Louisville, Lubbock, TX, Madison, WI, Minneapolis, New York, North Alabama (Decatur, AL), Phoenix, Plainview, TX, Raleigh, North Carolina, San Diego, Santa Barbara, CA, San Francisco. Tallahassee, FL, Washington, D.C. and Wichita, KS

Abbott received national publicity and multiple awards for her efforts in raising funds for the Alzheimer's Association. Initial plans were to expand the event to more cities and eventually establish a "Blondes vs. Brunettes Super Bowl".

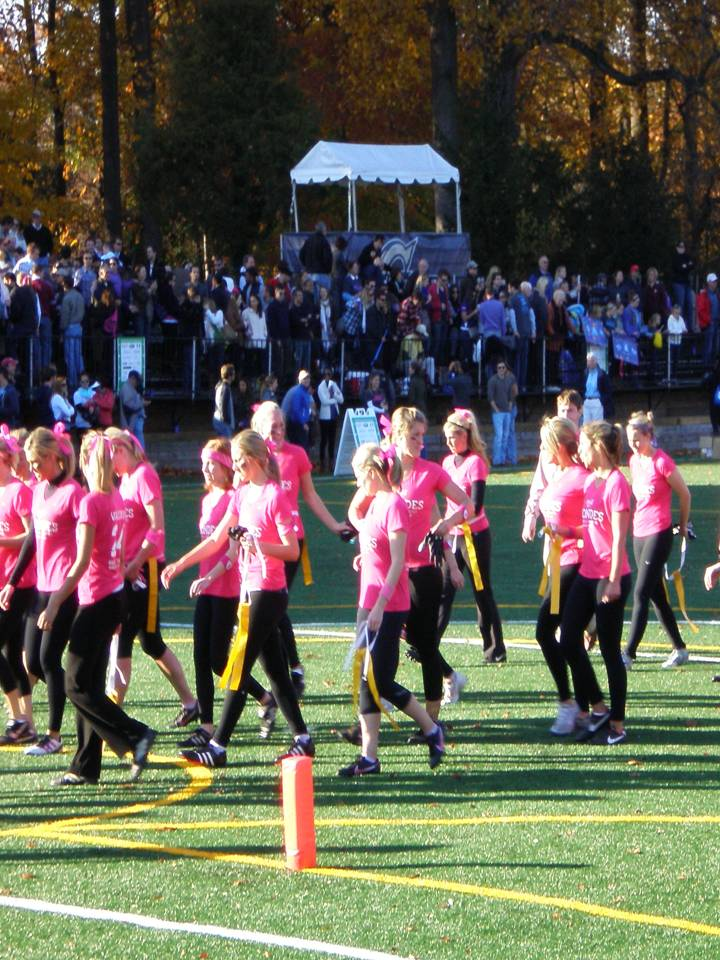
Team Blonde at the 2011 Blondes vs. Brunettes Powder Puff Football Game in Washington D.C.

Publicizing the event, local media outlets have used alliterative, attention grabbing headlines and topic leads such as, "Blondes battle brunettes to fight Alzheimer’s", "Blondes and brunettes battle it out to fund Alzheimer's research", "Blondes Battle Brunettes at the Cotton Bowl", and "Blond women will battle brunettes to help tackle Alzheimer's disease at Cotton Bowl Stadium Saturday evening.".

The game's increasing popularity in the Dallas-Fort Worth area resulted in the 2012 game moving to the Cotton Bowl to accommodate the larger crowds.

=== 2014 rebranding to RivALZ ===
Despite growing to nearly 50 cities, in 2014 ALS decided to drop the "blondes vs brunettes" theme that was created in 2005 and instead, re-brand the effort as "RivALZ", allowing participants to organize opposing teams around other rivalries such as east vs. west or city vs. suburb.

== Rules on hair color ==
Game rules do not require that hair color be natural, and it is common for many of the girls on the blonde team to have dyed hair.

An NBC Washington story cited participants changing their hair color in the weeks before the game and switching sides. Other media stories have highlighted intense workouts, team meetings that feature inspirational films such as Remember the Titans, and participants practicing their trash-talking to include trying to think up ways to intimidate their opponents.

== See also ==
- Blonde versus brunette rivalry
