= Humour in Hinduism =

Hinduism has a long tradition of humour, as evidenced by its presence in the ancient texts of India. This includes references made in legends of the gods, regional legends, as well as jokes about specific classes such as the Brahmins.

== Mythology ==
In an episode recounted in the Ramayana, the deity Indra tricks Ahalya into sleeping with him, taking the guise of her husband, Sage Gautama. Enraged, the sage curses Indra to possess a thousand vaginas all over his body in retribution.

The story of Ayyappan, the son of Shiva and Vishnu in the form of the female enchantress Mohini, is considered to be an example of risque humour. The deity Ganesha is generally depicted to be good humoured, pot-bellied, a mouse as his mount, and described to be a sweet tooth in his legends.

Krishna is described to be mischievous in his youth. In one story, he steals the clothes of the gopis (milkmaids) while they bathed, climbing upon a tree on the riverbank. He refuses to return the clothes until each woman walks up to the foot of the tree naked to retrieve her clothes. This is regarded to symbolise the idea that one cannot hide anything before God, before whom all souls are as good as naked. In another episode, he swallows dirt. When his foster mother Yashoda demands that he open his mouth, he reveals the entire universe within.

== See also ==
- Humour in Islam
- Jewish humor
- Humour in Sikhism
