= Scandinavian Journal of Psychology =

- Discipline: Psychology
- Language: English
- Edited by: Leif Edward Ottesen Kennair

Publication details
- History: 1960–present
- Frequency: Bimonthly
- Impact factor: 1.292 (2012)

Standard abbreviations
- ISO 4: Scand. J. Psychol.

Indexing
- ISSN: 0036-5564 (print); 1467-9450 (web)

The Scandinavian Journal of Psychology is a peer-reviewed academic journal on psychology. It is published in association with the Nordic Psychological Association and on behalf of the Scandinavian Psychological Associations. It was first published in 1960. The journal is divided into four sections: Cognition and Neurosciences, Development and Ageing, Personality and Social Psychology and Health and Disability.
