= Blond =

Human hair color

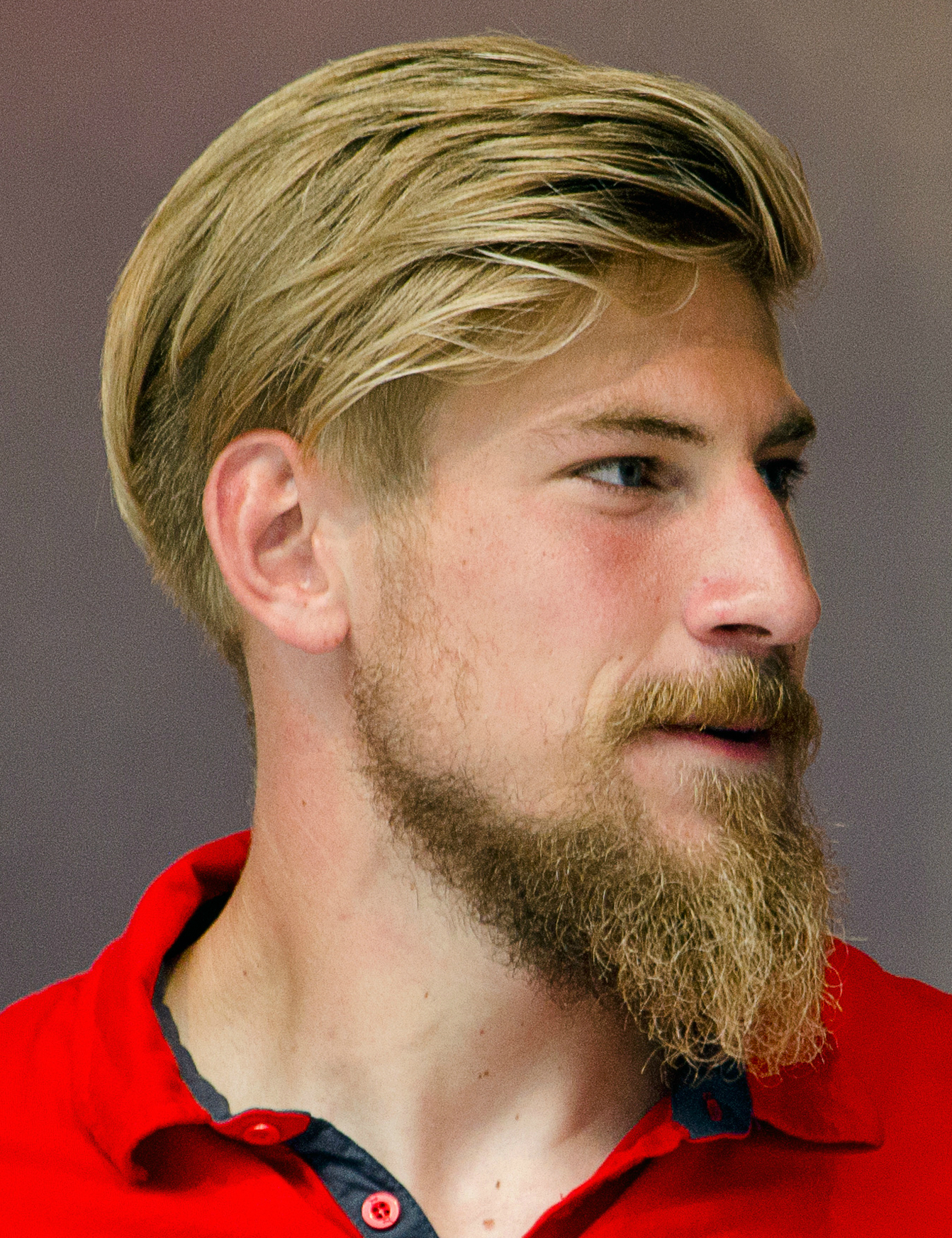
German footballer Lars Unnerstall, who has blond hair and a blond beard

Blond (masc) or blonde (fem), also referred to as fair hair, is a human hair color characterized by low levels of eumelanin, the dark pigment. The resultant visible hue depends on various factors, but always has some yellowish color. The color can be from the very pale blond (caused by a patchy, scarce distribution of pigment) to reddish "strawberry" blond or golden-brownish ("sandy") blond colors (the latter with more eumelanin). Occasionally, the state of being blond, and specifically the occurrence of blond traits in a predominantly dark or colored population are referred to as blondism.

Because hair color tends to darken with age, natural blond hair is significantly less common in adulthood. Naturally occurring blond hair is primarily found in people living in or descended from people who lived in Northern Europe, and may have evolved alongside the development of light skin that enables more efficient synthesis of vitamin D, due to northern Europe's lower levels of sunlight. Blond hair has also developed in other populations, although it is usually not as common, and can be found among the native populations of the Solomon Islands, Vanuatu, and Fiji; among the Berbers of North Africa; and among some Asian people.

In Western culture, blonde hair has long been associated with beauty and vitality. In the Greco-Roman world, blonde hair was frequently associated with prostitutes, who dyed their hair using saffron dyes in order to attract more customers. The Greeks stereotyped Thracians and slaves as light-haired and the Romans associated blondness with the Celts and the Germanic peoples to the north. In the ancient Greek world, the Iliad presented the mythological hero Achilles as what was then the ideal male warrior: handsome, tall, strong, and light-haired. In Western Europe during the Middle Ages, long and blonde hair was idealized as the paragon of female beauty. Sif, the wife of Thor in Norse mythology, and Iseult, the Celtic-origin legendary heroine, were both significantly portrayed as blonde. In contemporary Western culture, blonde women are often stereotyped as beautiful, but unintelligent.

== Etymology, spelling, and grammar ==
=== Origins and meanings ===
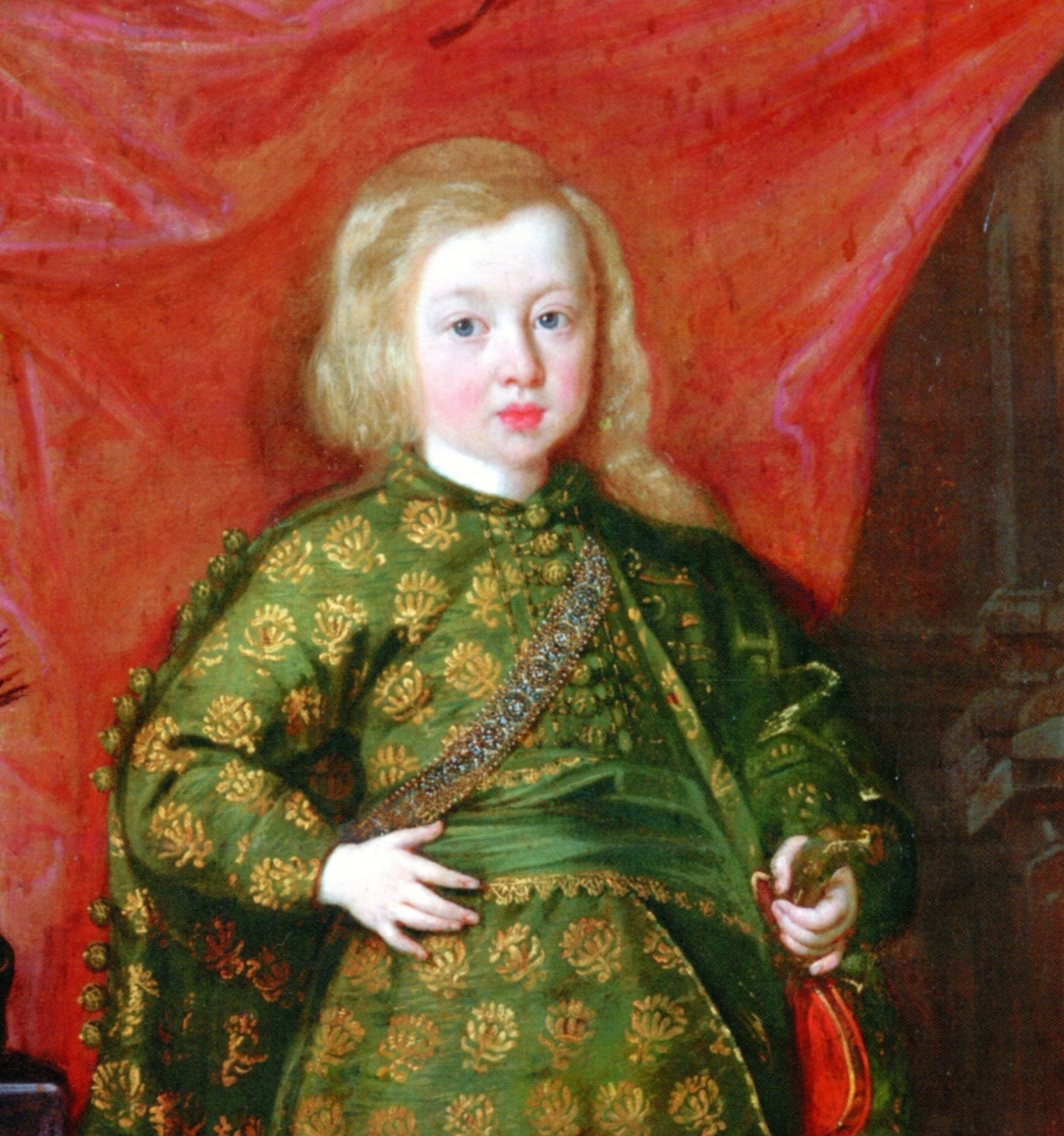
Detail of a portrait of Sigismund Casimir Vasa (c. 1644), with characteristic blond hair which darkened with time as confirmed by his later effigies

The word blond is first documented in English in 1481 and derives from Old French blund, blont, meaning 'a colour midway between golden and light chestnut'. It gradually eclipsed the native term fair, of same meaning, from Old English fæġer, causing fair later to become a general term for 'light complexioned'. This earlier use of fair survives in the proper name Fairfax, from Old English fæġer-feahs meaning 'blond hair'.

The word blond, taken from Old French, may derive from the Medieval Latin blundus, meaning 'yellow'. The feminine form blonde was introduced in the 17th century.

=== Usage ===
Blond/blonde, with its continued gender–varied usage, is one of the few adjectives in written English to retain separate lexical genders. The two forms, however, are pronounced identically. American Heritage's Book of English Usage propounds that, as "a blonde" (just so, with "blonde" as noun) might not uncommonly be used to describe a woman, but less often "a blond" used to describe a man, the term is an example of a "sexist stereotype [whereby] women are primarily defined by their physical characteristics." The Oxford English Dictionary (OED) records that the phrase "big blond beast" was used in the 20th century to refer specifically to men "of the Nordic type" (that is to say, blond-haired). The OED also records that this term for fair hair as an adjective is especially used with reference to women, in which case it is likely to be spelt blonde, citing three Victorian usages of the term. The masculine version is used in the plural, in "blonds of the European race", in a citation from 1833 Penny cyclopedia, which distinguishes genuine blondness as a Caucasian feature distinct from albinism.

By the early 1990s, blonde moment or being a dumb blonde had come into common parlance to mean "an instance of a person, esp. a woman... being foolish or scatter-brained." Another hair color word of French origin, brunette (from the same Germanic root that gave brown), functions in the same way in orthodox English. The OED gives brunet as meaning 'dark-complexioned' or a 'dark-complexioned person', citing a comparative usage of brunet and blond to Thomas Henry Huxley in saying, "The present contrast of blonds and brunets existed among them." Brunette can be used, however, like blonde, to describe a mixed-gender populace. The OED quotes Grant Allen, "The nation which resulted... being sometimes blonde, sometimes brunette."

Blond and blonde are also occasionally used to refer to objects that have a color reminiscent of fair hair. For example, the OED records its use in 19th-century poetic diction to describe flowers, "a variety of clay ironstone of the coal measures", "the colour of raw silk", a breed of ray, lager beer, and pale wood.

== Varieties ==
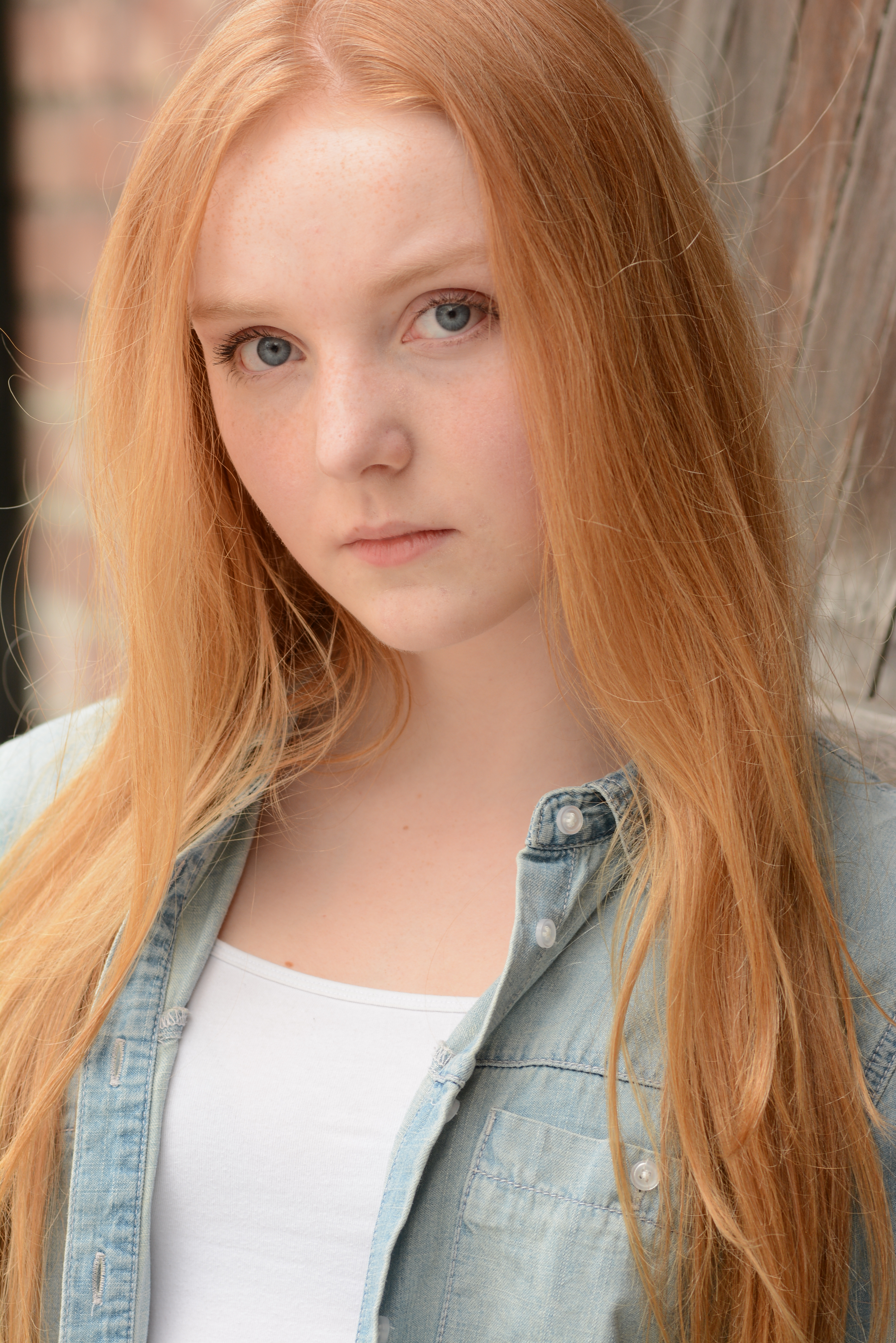
Actress Klara Gadd has strawberry blonde hair

Various subcategories of blond hair have been defined to describe the different shades and sources of the hair color more accurately. Common examples include the following:

- ash-blond: ashen or grayish blond.
- blond/flaxen: when distinguished from other varieties, "blond" by itself refers to a light but not whitish blond, with no traces of red, gold, or brown; this color is often described as "flaxen".
- dirty blond or dishwater blond: dark blond with flecks of golden blond and brown.
- golden blond: a darker to rich yellow blond.
- honey blond: dark iridescent blond.
- platinum blond or towheaded: whitish-blond.
- sandy blond: grayish-hazel or cream-colored blond.
- strawberry blond or Venetian blond: reddish blond

Artificially blond hair may be called bleached blond, bottle blond, or peroxide blond.

== Genetics of blond hair ==
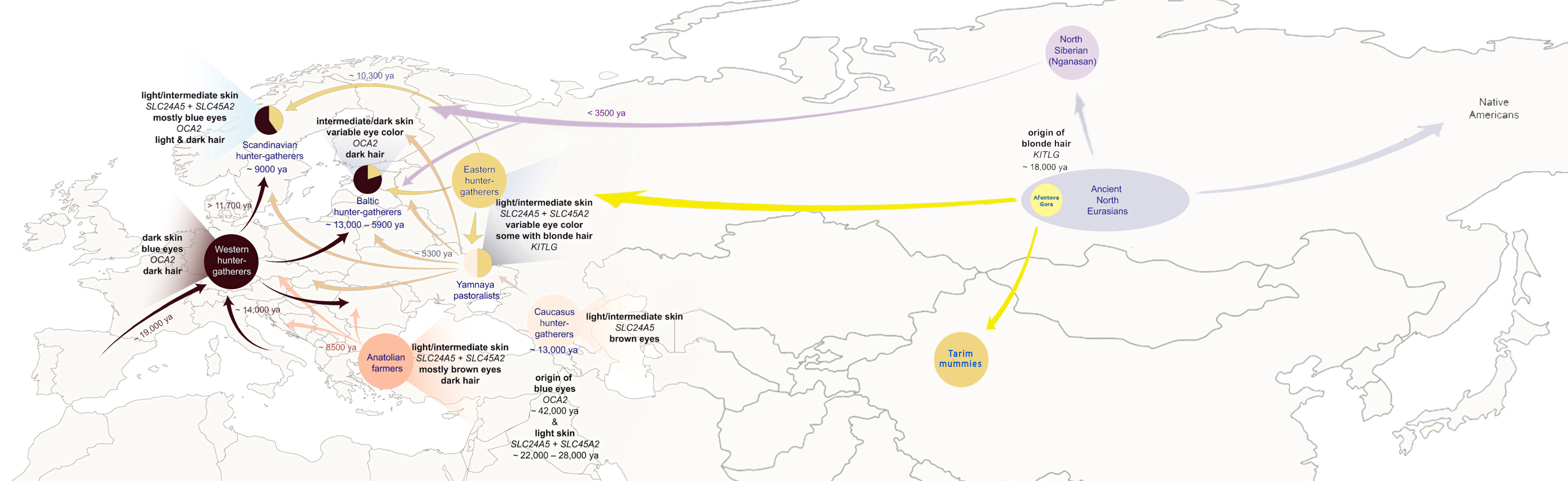
The mutation for blond hair is thought to have originated among the Afontova Gora population of the Ancient North Eurasian (ANE) cline of south-central Siberia

A typical explanation found in the scientific literature for the adaptation of light hair is related to the adaptation of light skin, and in turn the requirement for vitamin D synthesis and northern Europe's seasonally reduced solar radiation.

Ancient DNA analysis (ADNA) has revealed that the oldest fossil known to carry the mutated allele rs12821256 of the KITLG gene, which is responsible for blond hair in modern Europeans, is a 17,000 year old Ancient North Eurasian specimen from Afontova Gora in Southern Siberia. (Note: Japanese research in 2006 found that the genetic mutation that prompted the evolution of blond hair dates to the ice age that happened around 11,000 years ago. Since then, the 17,000-year-old remains of a blonde–haired North Eurasian hunter-gatherer have been found in eastern Siberia, suggesting an earlier origin.)

The precise genetic origin and spread of blond hair into its present-day distribution is a topic of debate amongst population geneticists.

Geneticist David Reich said that the hundreds of millions of copies of this SNP, the classic European blond hair mutation, entered continental Europe by way of a massive population migration from the Eurasian steppe, by a people who had substantial Ancient North Eurasian ancestry. Ancient North Eurasian admixture is present in Mesolithic fossils from Northern Europe, and is linked to the prediction of blond hair in Stone Age Scandinavians by ancient DNA analysis. Gavin Evans analyzed several years of research on the origin of European blond hair, and concluded that the widespread presence of blond hair in Europe is largely due to the territorial expansions of the "all-conquering" Western Steppe Herders; who carried the genes for blond hair. (Note: "But whatever the evolutionary causes of blond and red hair, their spread in Europe had little to do with their possible innate attractiveness and much to do with the success of the all-conquering herders from the steppes who carried these genes.") A review article published in 2020 analyzes fossil data from a wide variety of published sources. The authors affirm the previous statements, noting that Ancient North Eurasian-derived populations carried the derived blond hair allele to Europe, and that the "massive spread" of Yamnaya steppe pastoralists likely caused the "rapid selective sweep in European populations toward light skin and hair."

In contrast, geneticist Iosif Lazaridis questioned whether or not blond hair could have originated from the migration of Steppe peoples. He found evidence for blond individuals in ancient Southern Europe and the Levant, with no Steppe ancestry. He also observed that blond hair was rare in the available samples for early Bronze Age Steppe groups, yet common in the later Bronze Age groups, which is inconsistent with the theory that Steppe populations spread the phenotype for blond hair. However, this is consistent with a phenotype turnover occurring within the Steppe pastoralists, leading to a shift towards blond hair becoming a common hair color in the later Steppe-derived populations of Europe and Central Asia. Lazaridis further wrote that the frequencies of traits like blonde hair could have been shaped by mass migration or selection; but that it is more complex than "simple stories" of sexual selection, or of spreading by Steppe pastoralists.

A 2024 study found that both Neolithic farmer and Steppe-associated ancestries were more significantly associated with blond hair, while European hunter gatherers tended to have dark or even black hair.

== Prevalence ==
=== General ===
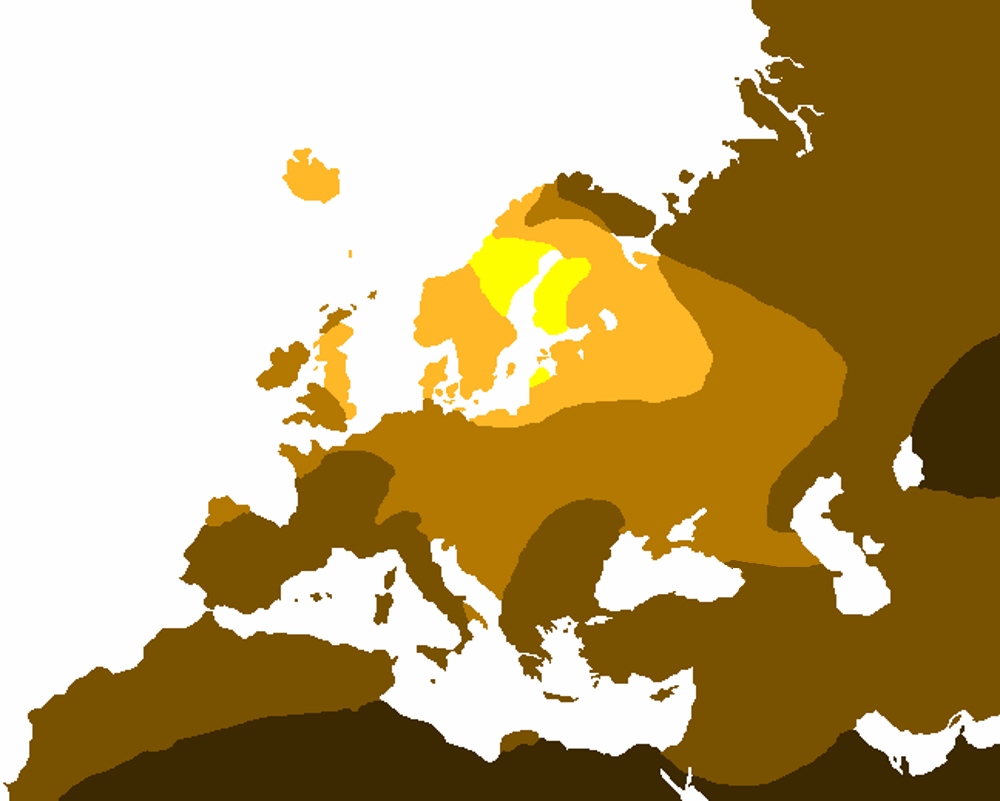
Anthropologist Peter Frost's distribution map of light hair in and around Europe, according to a 2006 study published by the University of St Andrews. It shows that it is most common in Northern Europe: 80—100% 50—79% 20—49% 1—19% Less than 1%

According to the sociologist Christie Davies, only around five percent of adults in Europe and North America are naturally blond. A study conducted in 2003 concluded that only four percent of American adults are naturally blond. A significant number of Caucasian women who have blonde hair have dyed it that way.

=== Europe ===
The pigmentation of both hair and eyes is lightest around the Baltic Sea, and darkness increases regularly and almost concentrically around this region.

In France, according to a source published 1939, blondism is more common in Normandy, and less common in the Pyrenees and the Mediterranean seacoast; 26% of the French population have blond or light brown hair. A 2007 study of French females showed that by then roughly 20% were blonde, although half of these blondes were fully fake. Roughly ten percent of French females are natural blondes, of which 60% bleach their hair to a lighter tone of blond.

In Portugal, the national average of the population shows 11% of varying traces of blondism, peaking at 15% blond people in Póvoa de Varzim in northern Portugal.

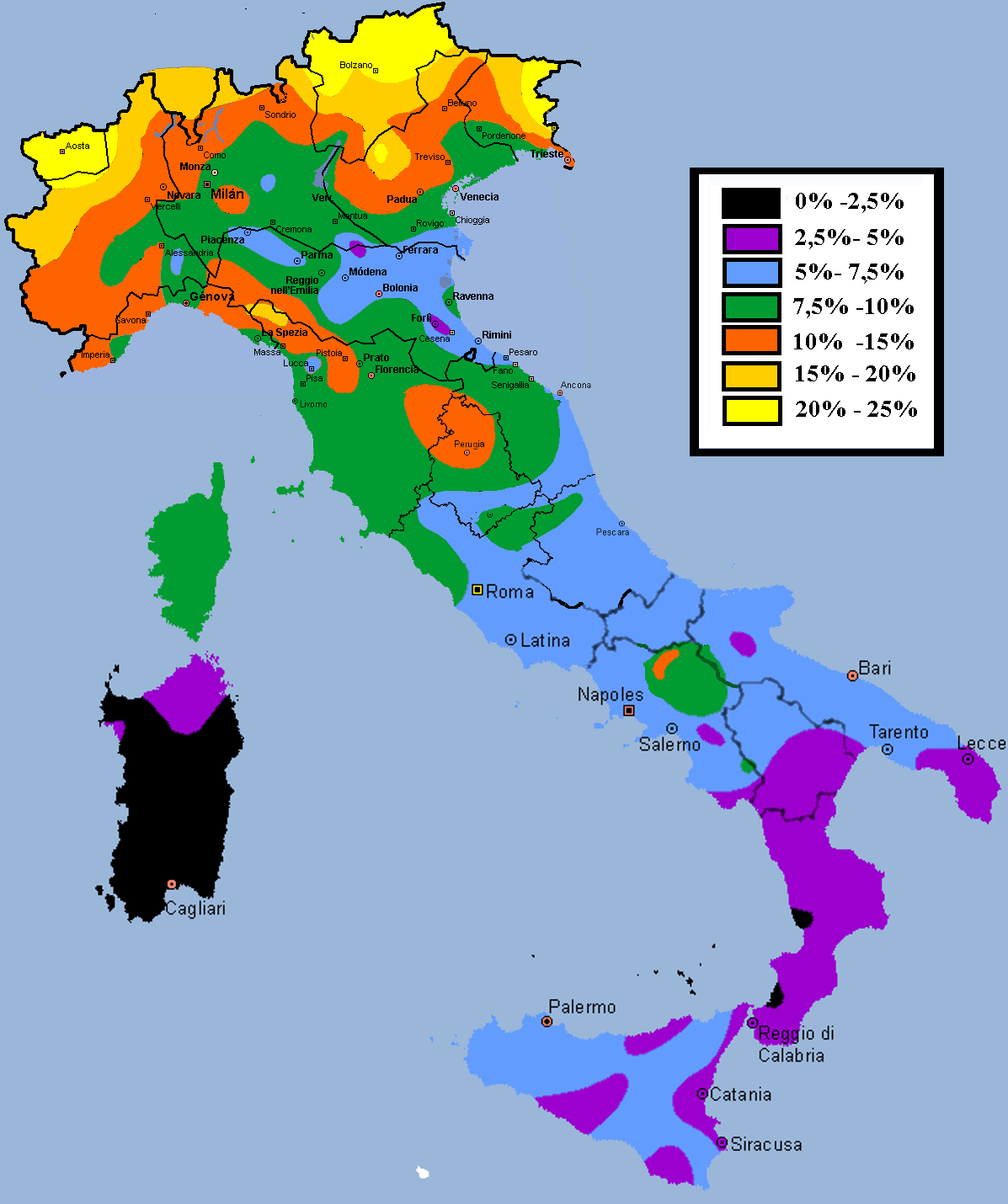
Geographical distribution of blond hair in the Italian geographical region, according to the physical anthropologist Renato Biasutti (1941)

In Italy, a study of Italian men conducted by Ridolfo Livi between 1859 and 1863 on the records of the National Conscription Service showed that 8.2% of Italian men exhibited blond hair; blondism frequency displayed a wide degree of regional variation, ranging from around 12.6% in Veneto to 1.7% among the Sardinians. In a more detailed study from the 20th-century geneticist Renato Biasutti, the regional contrasts of blondism frequency are better shown, with a greater occurrence in the northern regions, where the figure may be over 20%, and a lesser occurrence in Sardinia, where the frequency in many of its districts was 0.5%. With the exception of Benevento and the surrounding area in Campania, where various shades of blond hair were present in 10–15% of the population, Southern Italy as a whole averaged between 2.5% and 7.4%.

=== Africa ===
A number of blond naturally mummified bodies of common people (i.e. not proper mummies) dating to Roman-Christian period have been found in the Fagg El Gamous cemetery in Fayum, Egypt. "Of those whose hair was preserved 54% were blondes or redheads, and the percentage grows to 87% when light-brown hair color is added." Excavations have been ongoing since the 1980s. Burials seem to be clustered by hair-colour.

=== Oceania ===
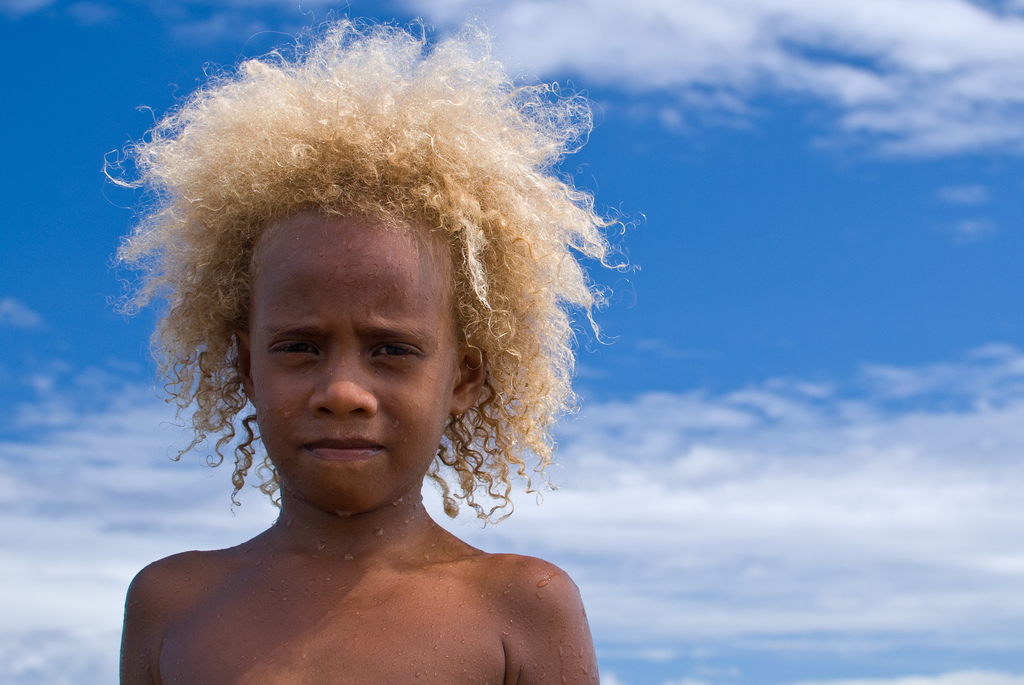
Blonde girl from Vanuatu

Blonde hair is also found in some other parts of the South Pacific, such as the Solomon Islands, Vanuatu, and Fiji, again with higher incidences in children. Blond hair in Melanesians is caused by an amino acid change in the gene TYRP1. This mutation is at a frequency of 26% in the Solomon Islands and is absent outside of Oceania.

=== Asia ===
The higher frequencies of light hair in Asia are prevalent among the Pamiris, Kalash, Nuristani and Uyghur ethnic groups.

According to geneticist David Reich, blond hair has ancient roots in Asia. The derived allele responsible for blond hair in Europeans likely evolved first among the Ancient North Eurasians. The earliest known individual with this allele is a Siberian fossil from Afontova Gora, in south-central Siberia. Reich has written that the derived SNP for blond hair entered continental Europe by way of a massive population migration from the Eurasian steppe, by a people who had substantial Ancient North Eurasian ancestry. Blond hair has been discovered in human burial sites in north-western China and Mongolia dating to the Iron Age.

The Hmong people, originally from northern China, were historically recorded as having blonde hair and blue eyes by the Chinese in ancient times, but their features became darker as they migrated out of China and in to Southeast Asia. The ethnic Miao people of Guizhou province from China, a subgroup of Hmong people, have been described as having blue eyes and blonde hair. F.M Savina of the Paris Foreign missionary society wrote that the Miao are "pale yellow in complexion, almost white, their hair is often light or dark brown, sometimes even red or corn-silk blond, and a few even have pale blue eyes."

Chinese historical documents describe blond haired, blue-eyed warriors among the Xiongnu, a nomadic equestrian culture from Mongolia, who practiced Tengriism. The Shiwei people were a Mongolic-speaking ethnic group who were blond-haired and blue eyed. Blond hair can still be seen among people from the region they inhabited. Some Xianbei were described with blond hair and blue eyes according to Chinese historical chronicles. The Uriankhai tribe of Mongols, to which the military generals Subotai and Jelme belonged, were described by Mongol chronicles as blond haired in the 2nd millennium CE. The Tuvans are a Turkic ethnic group with an occasional occurrence of blond hair with freckles, blue-green eyes.

Children from different ethnicities around Asia

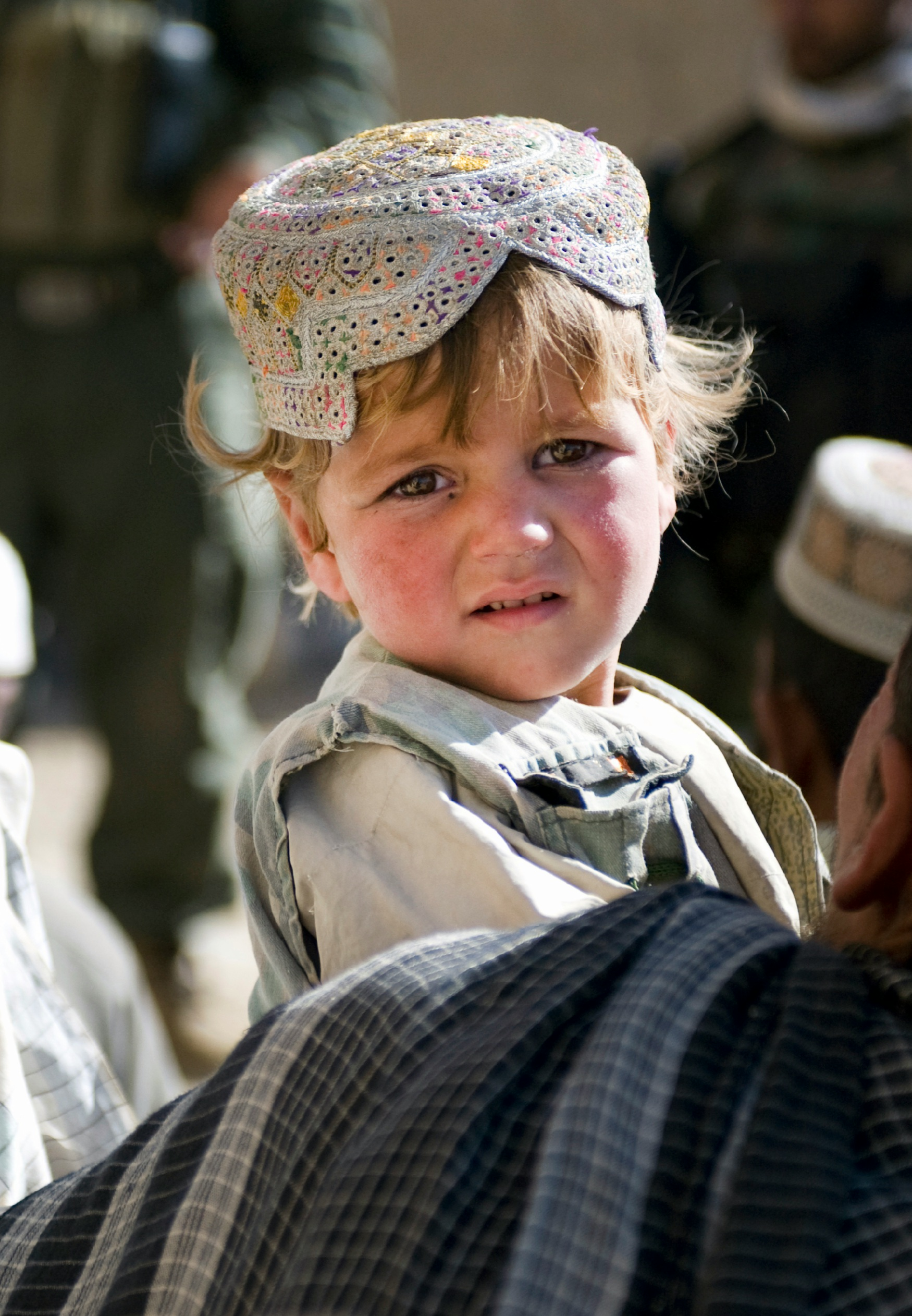
Pashtun baby with blond hair in Afghanistan

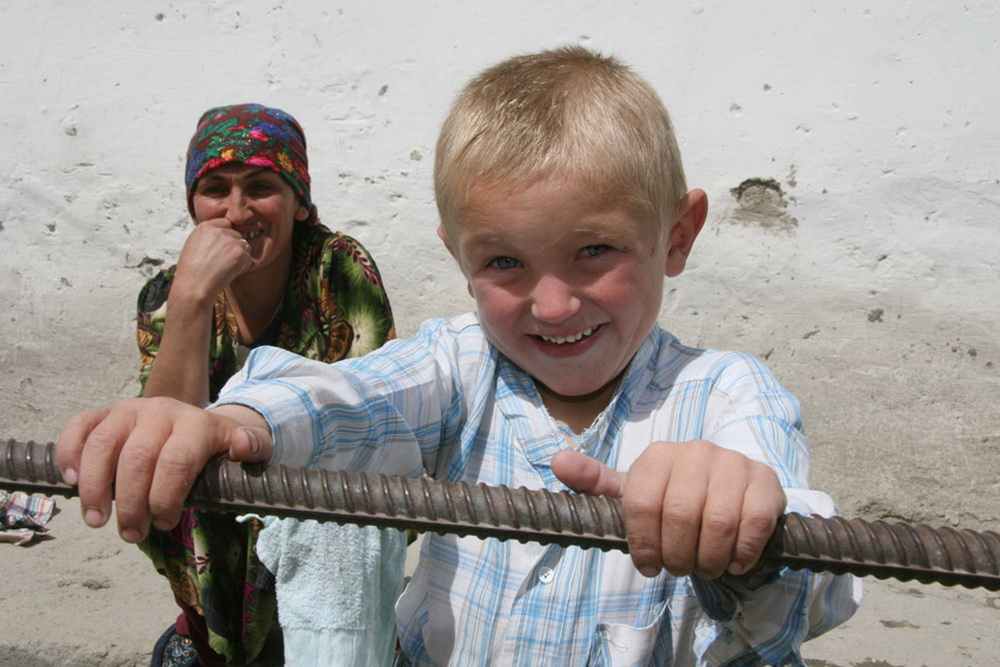
Pamiri child in Tajikistan

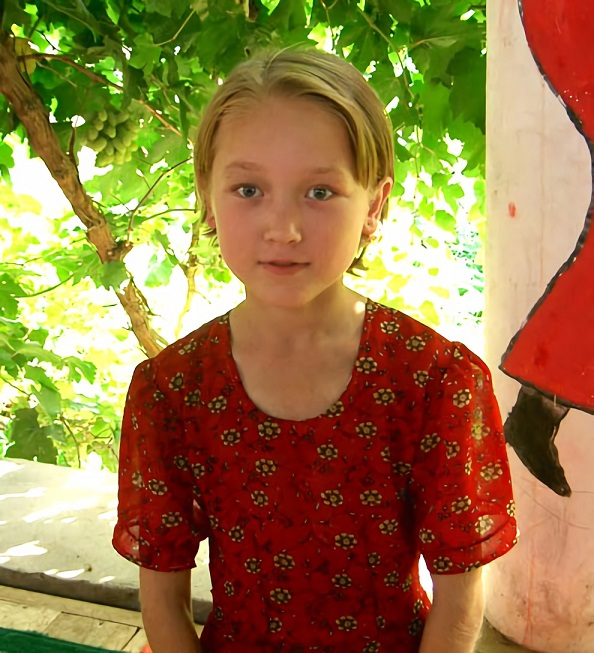
Uyghur girl in Turpan, Xinjiang, China

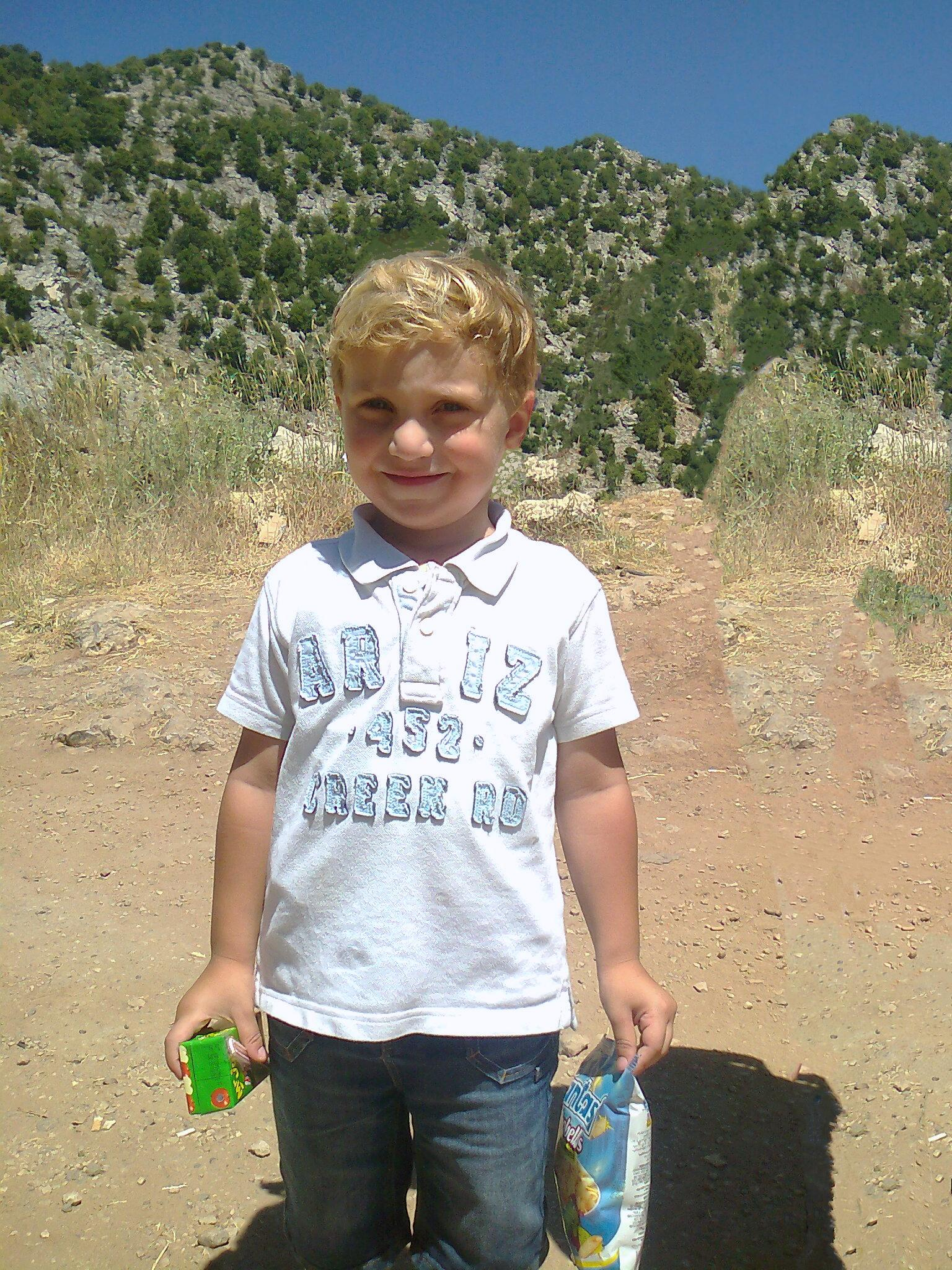
Maronite boy in Mount Lebanon, Lebanon

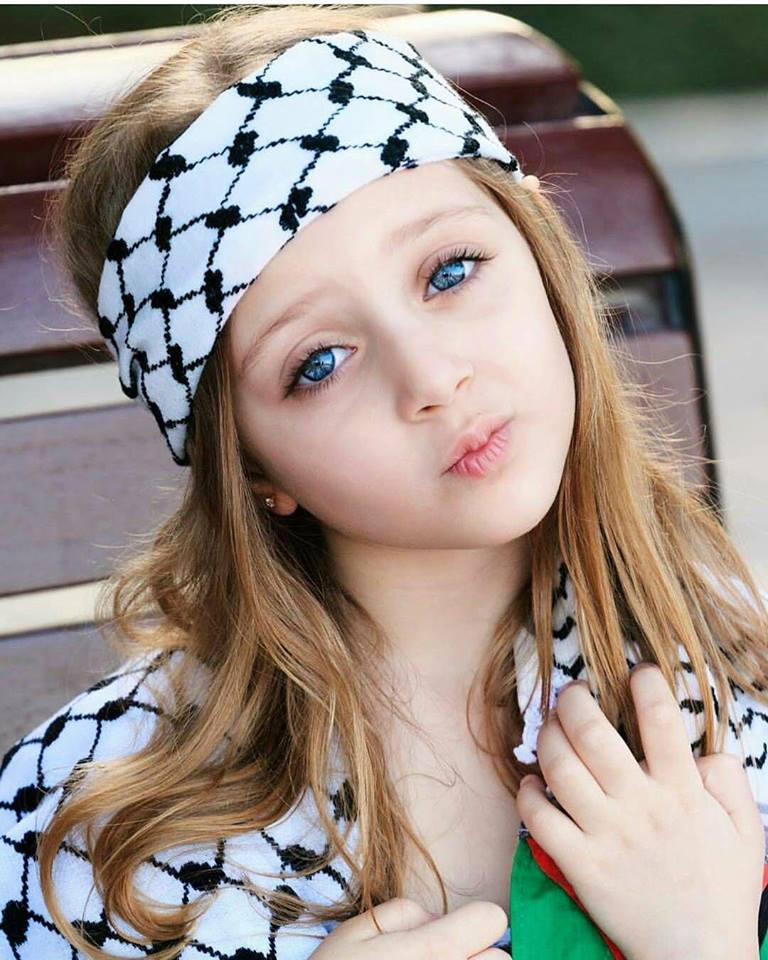
Palestinian girl with blond hair in Palestine

== Historical cultural perceptions ==
=== Ancient Greece ===
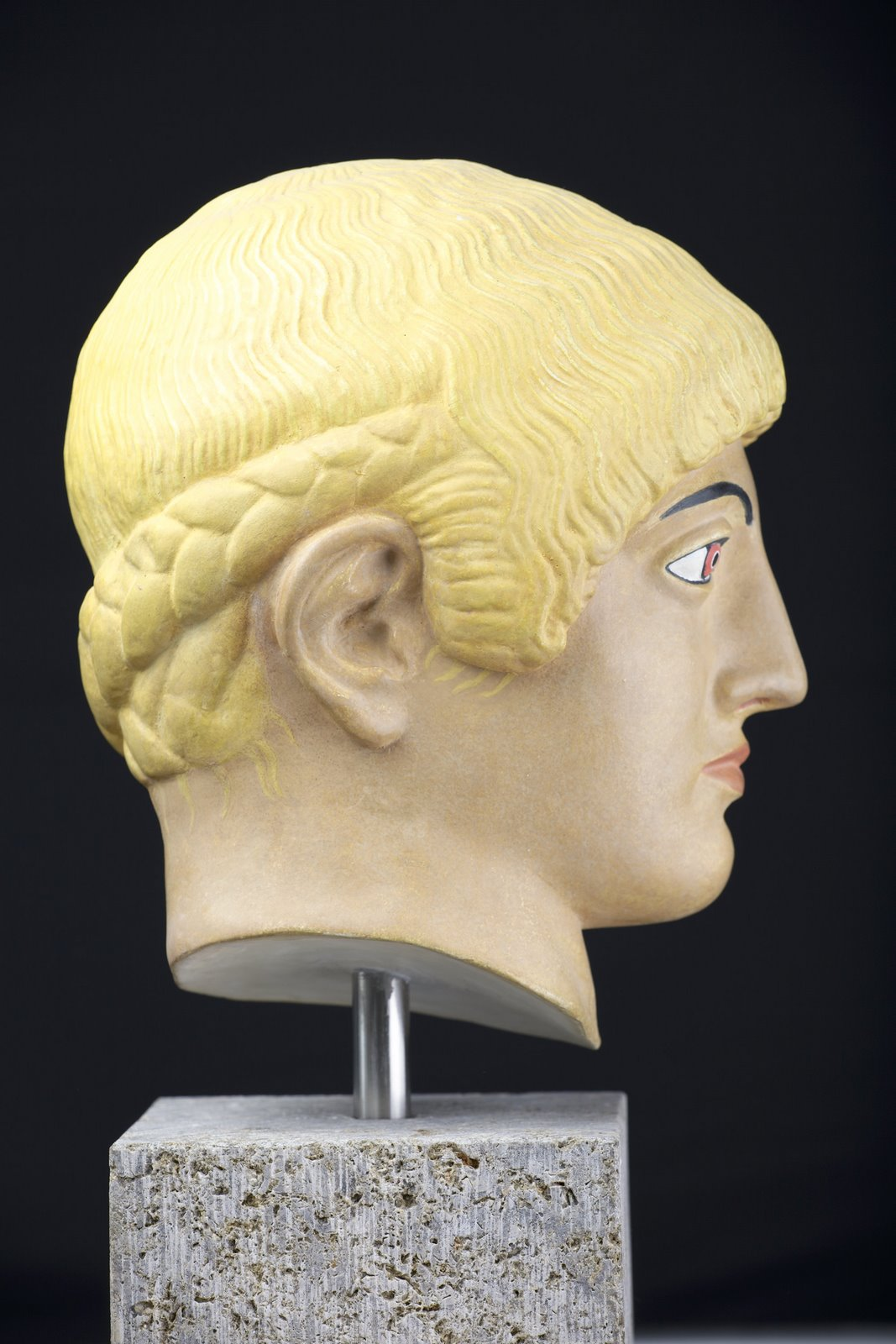
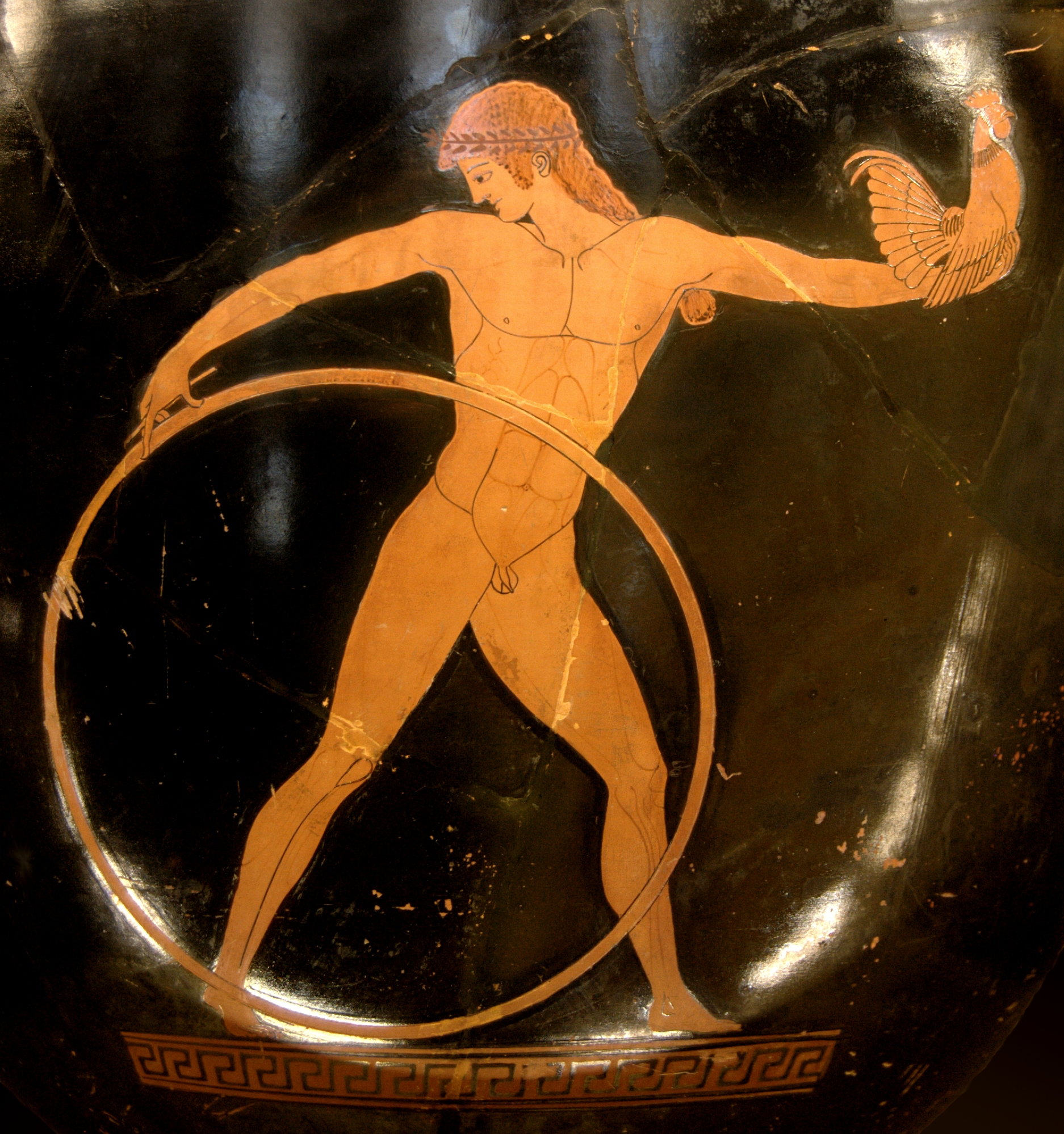
Left: Reconstructed Blond Kouros's Head of the Acropolis, c. 480 BC.
Right: Ganymede, a Trojan youth, rolling a hoop, Attic vase c. 500 BC.

Most people in ancient Greece had dark hair and, as a result of this, the Greeks found blond hair immensely fascinating. In the Homeric epics, Menelaus the king of the Spartans is, together with some other Achaean leaders, portrayed as blond. Other light-haired characters in the Homeric poems are Peleus, Achilles, Meleager, Agamede, and Rhadamanthys. The traces of hair color on Greek korai probably reflect the colors the artists saw in natural hair; these colors include a broad diversity of shades of blond, red and brown. The minority of statues with blond hair range from strawberry blond up to platinum blond.

Sappho of Lesbos (c. 630–570 BC) wrote that purple-colored wraps as headdress were good enough, except if the hair was blond: "...for the girl who has hair that is yellower than a torch [it is better to decorate it] with wreaths of flowers in bloom." Sappho's contemporary Alcman praised golden hair as one of the most desirable qualities of a beautiful woman, describing in various poems "the girl with the yellow hair" and a girl "with the hair like purest gold".

In the fifth century BC, the sculptor Pheidias may have depicted the Greek goddess of wisdom Athena's hair using gold in his famous statue of Athena Parthenos, which was displayed inside the Parthenon. The Greeks thought of the Thracians who lived to the north as having reddish-blond hair. Because many Greek slaves were captured from Thrace, slaves were stereotyped as blond or red-headed. "Xanthias" (Ξανθίας), referring to "light-colored hair", was a common name for slaves in ancient Greece and a slave by this name appears in many of the comedies of Aristophanes. Historian and Egyptologist Joann Fletcher asserts that the Macedonian ruler Alexander the Great and members of the Macedonian Greek Ptolemaic dynasty of Hellenistic Egypt had blond hair, such as Arsinoe II and Berenice II. Additionally, the ancient Greek lyric poet Bacchylides wrote of "the blonde daughters of the Lacedaemonians" (Spartans), while also noting the light hair of athletes at the Nemean Games.

Greek prostitutes frequently dyed their hair blond using saffron dyes or colored powders. Blond dye was highly expensive, took great effort to apply, and smelled repugnant, but none of these factors inhibited Greek prostitutes from dying their hair. As a result of this and the natural rarity of blond hair in the Mediterranean region, by the fourth century BC, blond hair was inextricably associated with prostitutes. The comic playwright Menander (c. 342/41–c. 290 BC) protests that "no chaste woman ought to make her hair yellow". At another point, he deplores blond hair dye as dangerous: "What can we women do wise or brilliant, who sit with hair dyed yellow, outraging the character of gentlewomen, causing the overthrow of houses, the ruin of nuptials, and accusations on the part of children?"

Greek authors associated light hair with northern peoples. The historian Diodorus Siculus wrote that the Gauls were tall, generally heavily built, very light-skinned, light-haired (xanthoí), and not only naturally so, while also noting that "their children are usually born with grayish (polia) hair, but as they grow older the colour of their hair changes to that of their parents". Strabo observed that the Gauls were more light-haired (xanthotriches) than the Britons, while the Germans were wilder, taller, and had lighter (xanthotetos) hair than the Gauls. Galen reported that peoples from cold, wet places, such as the Illyrians, Germans, Dalmatians, Sarmatians, and Scythians, had "reddish-fair" (purrhas) hair, in contrast to those from hot or well-balanced lands, who had "dark" (melaina) hair. Adamantius, in his work based on the Greek physiognomist Polemon, wrote that the Scythians and Celts could have "excessively light" (agan xanthe) and "whitish" (hupoleukos) hair.

=== Roman Empire ===
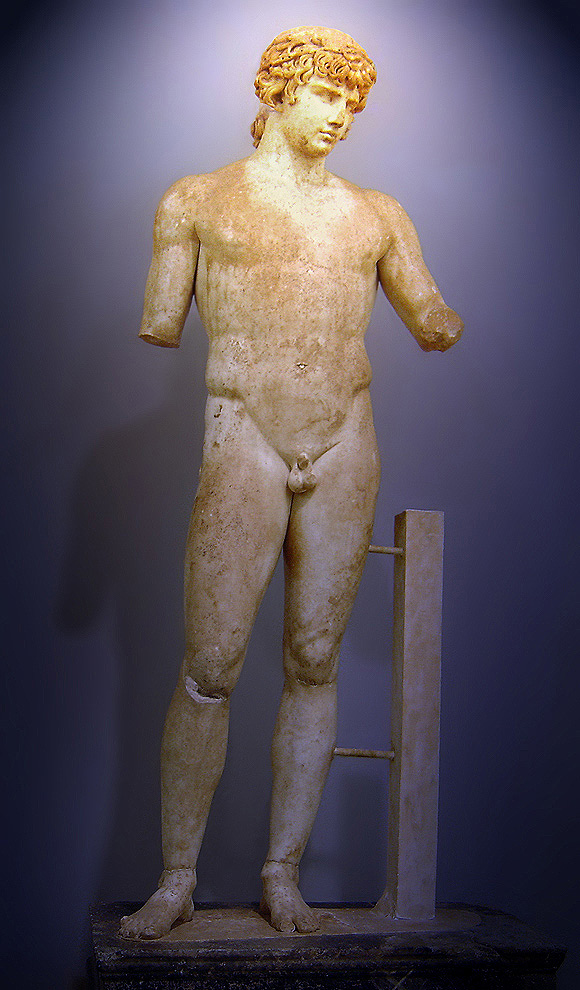
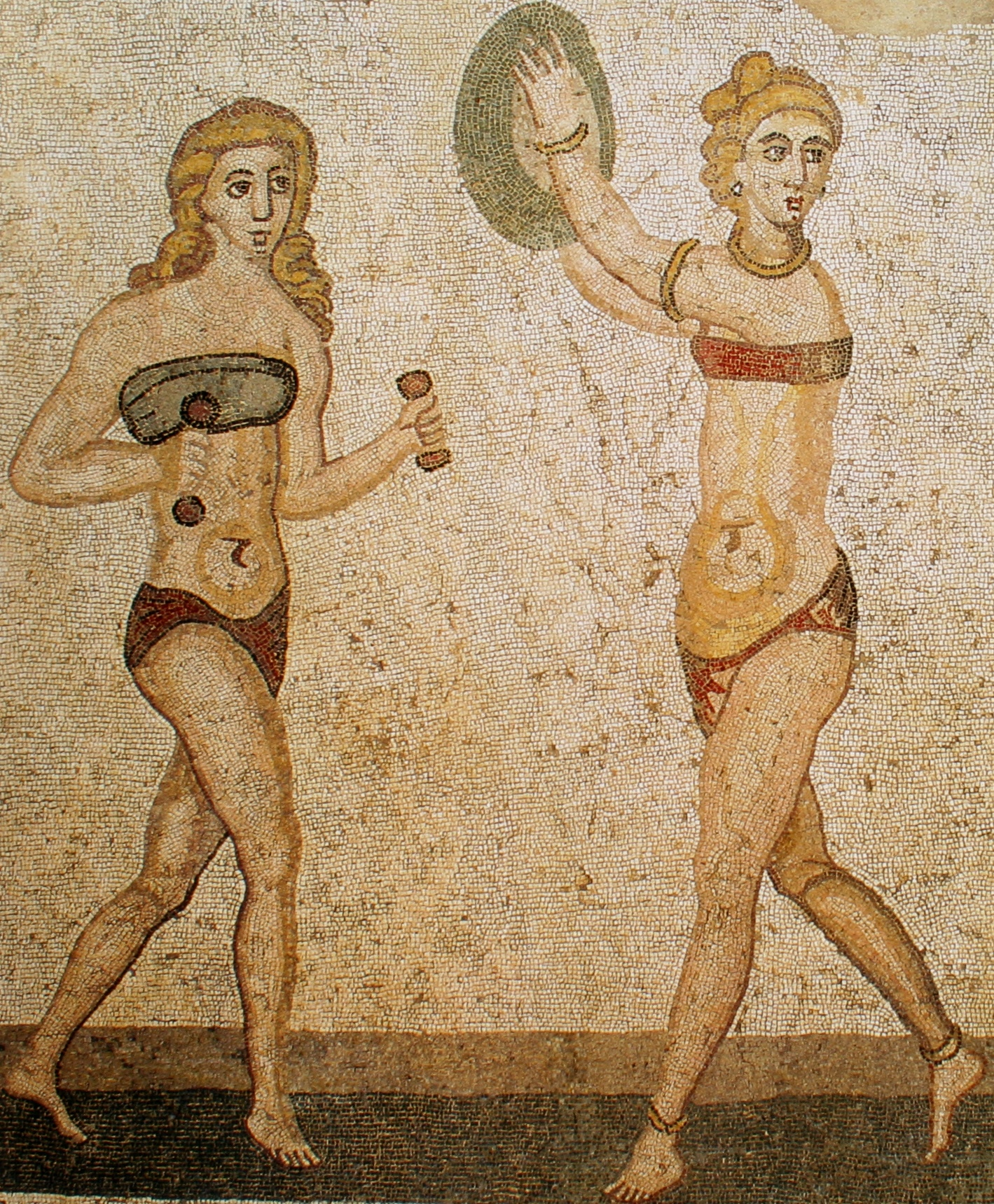
On the left: Statue of Antinous (Delphi), depicting Antinous, polychrome Parian marble, made during the reign of Hadrian (r. 117–138 AD)
On the right: detail of athletic women in the "bikini girls" mosaic of the Villa Romana del Casale, Roman Sicily, 4th century AD

During the early years of the Roman Empire, blond hair was associated with prostitutes. The preference changed to bleaching the hair blond when Greek culture, which practiced bleaching, reached Rome, and was reinforced when the legions that conquered Gaul returned with blond slaves. Sherrow also states that Roman women tried to lighten their hair, but the substances often caused hair loss, so they resorted to wigs made from the captives' hair. According to Francis Owen, Roman literary records describe several well-known Roman historical personalities as light-haired.

Juvenal wrote in a satirical poem that Messalina, Roman empress of noble birth, would hide her black hair with a blond wig for her nightly visits to the brothel: sed nigrum flavo crinem abscondente galero intravit calidum veteri centone lupanar. Roman historian Suetonius wrote that Augustus (r. 27 BC – 14 AD), the first emperor of Rome, had curly hair that was inclined towards golden (subflavum), which historian Adrian Goldsworthy interprets as being either "slightly blond" or "brown rather than black". Suetonius also noted that Nero's hair was subflavum, and recorded a tradition that an ancestor of the Domitii had his black hair and beard miraculously transformed to a bronze-like color by the Dioscuri, a trait reportedly seen in his descendants. In his Commentary on the Aeneid of Virgil, Maurus Servius Honoratus noted that the respectable matron was only black haired, never blonde. In the same passage, he mentioned that Cato the Elder wrote that some matrons would sprinkle golden dust on their hair to make it reddish-color. Emperor Lucius Verus (r. 161–169 AD) was said to sprinkle gold-dust on his already light (flaventium) hair to make it blonder and brighter. While Sulla considered that "his golden (khrusopon) head of hair gave him a singular appearance."

The poet Ovid mentions blond hair alongside various features of women that attract his desire:

Fair ones capture me: I'm captured by golden girls,
but Venus is still pleasing when darkly coloured.
If dark tresses hang on a snowy neck,
then Leda was famed for her black hair;
if they're golden, Aurora's saffron hair pleases.
My desire adapts itself to all the stories…

From an ethnic point of view, Roman authors associated blond and red hair with the Gauls and the Germans: e.g., the poet Virgil describes the hair of the Gauls as "golden" (aurea caesaries), Tacitus wrote that "the Germans have fierce blue eyes, red-blond hair (rutilae comae), huge (tall) frames"; in accordance with Ammianus, almost all the Gauls were "of tall stature, fair and ruddy". Juvenal contrasted Roman and Germanic appearances, asking: "Who is astounded at the blue eyes of the German, at his yellow hair, at his twisting its tufts into a moistened curl? Because, to be sure, this natural appearance is common to all of them." Celtic and Germanic peoples of the provinces, among the free subjects called peregrini, served in Rome's armies as auxilia, such as the cavalry contingents in the army of Julius Caesar. Some became Roman citizens as far back as the 1st century BC, following a policy of Romanization of Gaul and Lesser Germania. Sometimes entire Celtic and Germanic tribes were granted citizenship, such as when emperor Otho granted citizenship to all of the Lingones in 69 AD.

By the 1st century BC, the Roman Republic had expanded its control into parts of western Germany, and by 85 AD the provinces of Germania Inferior and Germania Superior were formally established there. Yet as late as the 4th century AD, Ausonius, a poet and tutor from Burdigala, wrote a poem about an Alemanni slave girl named Bissula, whom he had recently freed after she'd been taken as a prisoner of war in the campaigns of Valentinian I, noting that her adopted Latin language marked her as a woman of Latium yet her blond-haired, blue-eyed appearance ultimately signified her true origins from the Rhine. Further south, the Iberian Peninsula was originally inhabited by Celtiberians outside of Roman control. The gradual Roman conquest of Iberia was completed by the early 1st century AD. The Romans established provinces such as Hispania Terraconensis that were inhabited largely by Gallaeci, whose red- and blond-haired descendants (which also include those of Visigothic origins) have continued to inhabit northern areas of Spain such as Galicia and Portugal into the modern era.

The Goths, a Germanic tribe who played a central role in the Fall of the Western Roman Empire through their conquest, were always described in ancient sources as tall and athletic, with light skin, yellow (blond) hair and blue eyes, The contemporary Greek scholar and historian Procopius noted of the Goths: "they all have white bodies and fair hair, and are tall and handsome to look upon."

=== Medieval Europe ===
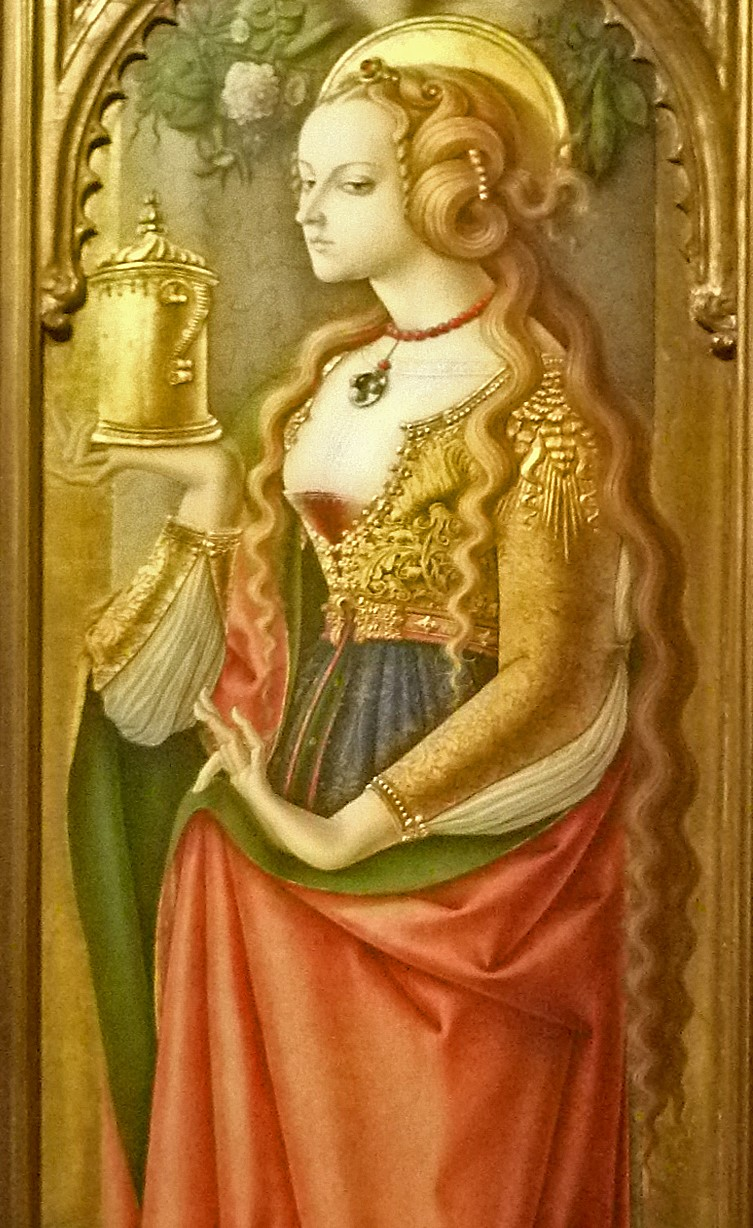
Mary Magdalene (c. 1480–1487), altarpiece in International Gothic style by Carlo Crivelli showing her with long, blonde hair

Medieval Scandinavian art and literature often places emphasis on the length and color of a woman's hair, considering long, blond hair to be the ideal, as it was associated with gold. In Norse mythology, the goddess Sif has famously blond hair. In the Old Norse Gunnlaug Saga, Helga the Beautiful, described as "the most beautiful woman in the world", is said to have had blond hair so long that it can "envelope her entirely". In the Poetic Edda poem Rígsþula, the blond man Jarl is considered to be the ancestor of the dominant warrior class.

The Scandinavians were not the only ones to place strong emphasis on the beauty of blond hair; the French writer Christine de Pisan writes in her book The Treasure of the City of Ladies (1404) that "there is nothing in the world lovelier on a woman's head than beautiful blond hair". In medieval artwork, female saints are often shown with long, shimmering blond hair, which emphasizes their holiness and virginity. At the same time, however, Eve is sometimes shown with long, blond hair, which frames her nude body and draws attention to her sexual attractiveness.

In the older versions of the story of Tristan and Iseult, Tristan falls in love with Iseult after seeing only a single lock of her long, blond hair. In fact, Iseult was so closely associated with blondness that, in the poems of Chrétien de Troyes, she is called "Iseult le Blonde". In Geoffrey Chaucer's Canterbury Tales (written from 1387 until 1400), the knight describes the beautiful Princess Emily in his tale, stating, "yclothed was she fressh, for to devyse:/Hir yellow heer was broided in a tresse/Behinde hir bak, a yerde long, I gesse" (lines 1048–1050).

Because of blond hair's relative commonness in northern Europe, folk tales from these regions tend to feature large numbers of blond protagonists, although these stories may not have been seen by their original tellers as idealizing blond hair. Furthermore, it is noted that there is also a black-haired ideal of female beauty in northern Europe, as shown in plays like Snow White and other forms of entertainment portraying black-haired heroines. Similarly, Nordic Skalds often glorified dark-haired women.

During the medieval period, Spanish ladies preferred to dye their hair black, yet by the time of the Renaissance in the 16th century the fashion (imported from Italy) was to dye their hair blond or red.

=== Early twentieth-century ===
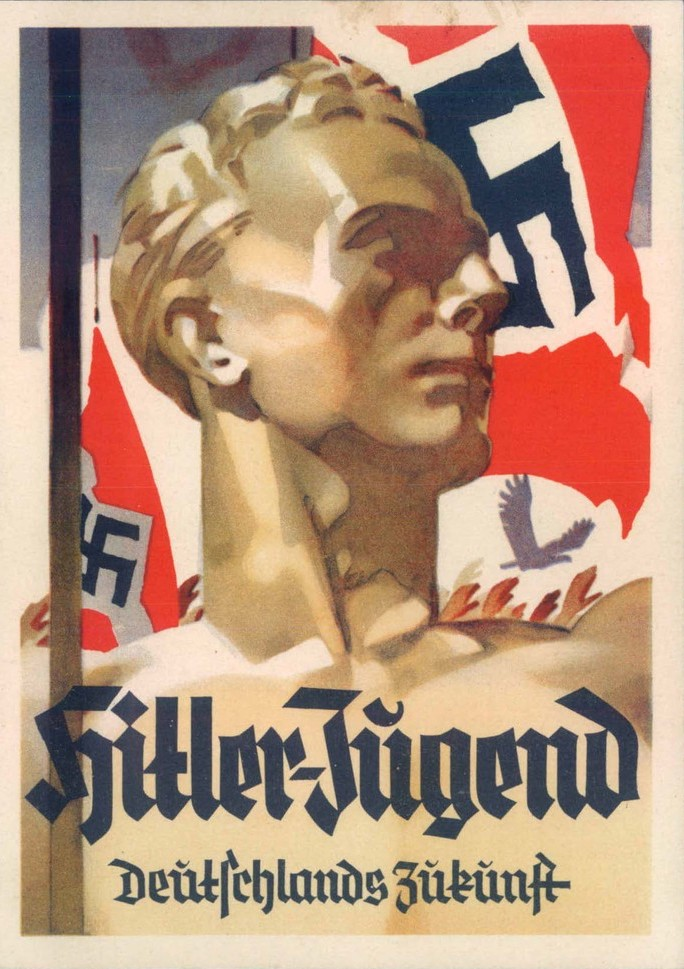
Propaganda in Nazi Germany often featured people with blond hair and blue eyes and other "Teutonic" traits, said to embody features of a "master race".

In 'Mark Twain and the American West', American novel writer Willa Cather's depiction of Alexander the Great in 'Alexander's Bridge' was described as "embodying the ideal", a "large, strong man with broad shoulders and rugged, blond good looks".

In Nazi Germany, blond, stern-jawed men were seen as the masculine ideal as depicted in the films of Leni Riefenstahl and other propaganda. Writer R. Horrocks noted that totalitarianism reached a ludicrous extreme in Nazi society, where "men were virile blond warriors, women were breeders, and gay men were killed in the death camps".

The fact that many Nazi leaders, including Adolf Hitler, did not possess these traits was noted with irony by the Allies of World War II. The most famous joke on the subject asked: What is the ideal German? Blond like Hitler, slim like Göring, masculine like Goebbels. . . .

Senior curator at the Norwegian Museum of Science and Technology Jon Røyne Kyllingstad has written that in the early twentieth-century racialist and supremacist thinkers promulgated the theory that human features such as blond hair and blue eyes were hallmarks of a "master race". In the 1920s, the eugenicist Eugen Fischer invented a hair palette called the Fischer scale that he said could categorize racial typology—these typologies were abandoned after World War II. Kyllingstad sees classification of race based on physical characteristics such as hair color as a "flawed, pseudo-scientific relic of the past".

== Modern cultural stereotypes ==
=== Sexuality ===
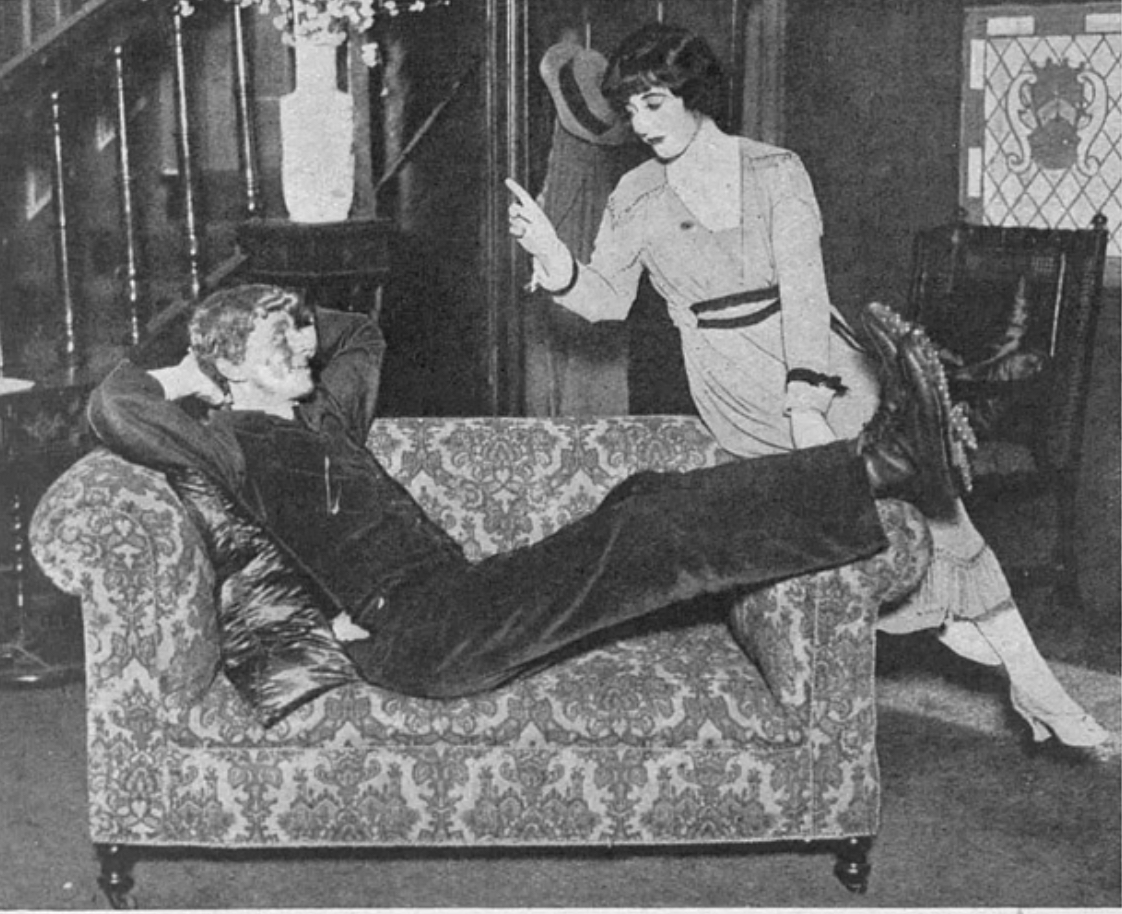
In the stage play "A Week-End" (1918), Lucille (Yvonne Arnaud) is depicted as a French woman with a "weakness for yellow-haired men", and in expressing her deep attraction and admiration to her love interest Ambrose is fixated on his hair color.

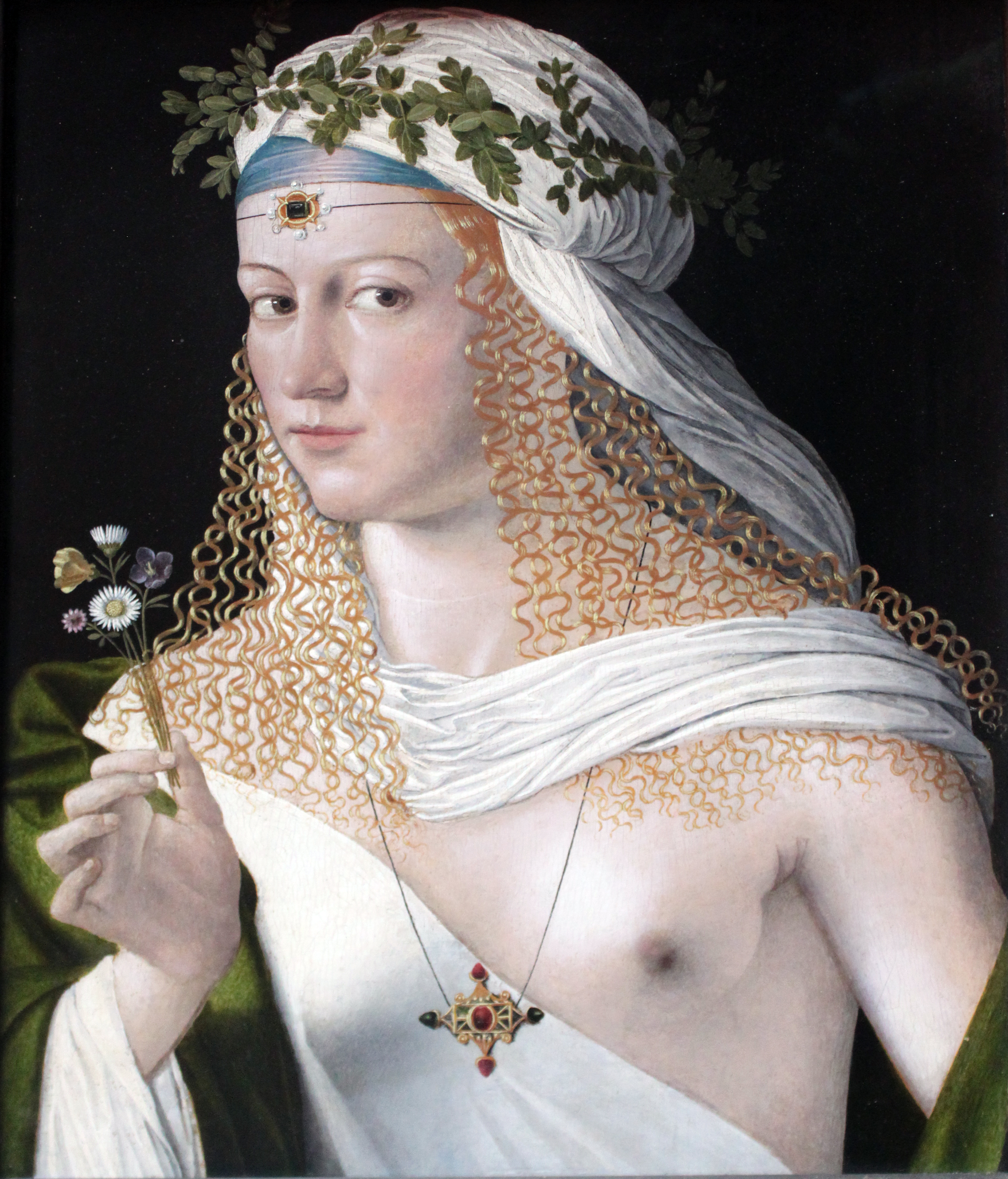
Portrait of a Woman by Bartolomeo Veneto, traditionally assumed to be Lucrezia Borgia

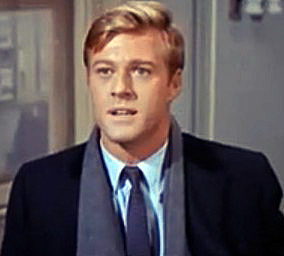
Robert Redford, a well-known natural blond actor and "Male Sex Symbol of the Seventies" (photo from Barefoot in the Park, 1967)

In contemporary Western popular culture, blonde women are sometimes stereotyped as being attractive. For example, Anita Loos popularized this idea in her 1925 novel Gentlemen Prefer Blondes. However, studies which sought to verify this found no evidence for a general preference of blonde women among Western men. A 2008 study found that men in Greater London, England preferred dark haired women rather than women with blond hair. A 2018 study based on University of Florida students found that men prefer brunette women over blonde women. Swami, et al. (2008) suggested that men may prefer women with dark hair because they are predominant in the fashion and modelling industries, or because they may be perceived as healthier or more fertile than blonde women.

In Central Asia and East Asia, blonde women are ranked below black-haired women in the hierarchy of female attractiveness. In the Soviet Union, Russian schoolteachers struggled to convince Central Asian students that blue-eyed, blonde heroines in Russian poetry were attractive. The ethnic Kyrgyz students, in particular, regarded blonde women as "hideous", and insisted that their hair be changed to black. Popular television commercials in Japan have portrayed blonde women as highly jealous of black-haired Japanese women. In 2014, a study found that blond-haired Swedish women were ranked below Chinese women in the female beauty hierarchy. According to the author, the blonde hair of Swedish women reduced their femininity, because it was seen as a Western trait. These women's Swedish husbands were highly attracted to local East Asian women, which further reduced the self-esteem of the blonde Swedish women.

Similarly in many eastern cultures (Asia, The Middle East) blond men are often seen as symbolizing western masculinity: excessively manly, flirtatious, and sexually attractive. Depictions of relations between blond European men and dark-haired Arab women have even been used as an allegory for European colonialism, specifically in regards to French Algeria.

=== Intelligence ===
Originating in Europe, the "blonde stereotype" is also associated with being less serious or less intelligent. Blonde jokes are a class of jokes based on the stereotype of blonde women as unintelligent. In Brazil, this extends to blonde women being looked down upon, as reflected in sexist jokes, as also sexually licentious. It is believed the originator of the dumb blonde was an eighteenth-century blonde French prostitute named Rosalie Duthé whose reputation of being beautiful but dumb inspired a play about her called Les Curiosités de la Foire (Paris 1775). Blonde actresses have contributed to this perception; some of them include Jean Harlow, Judy Holliday, Jayne Mansfield and Goldie Hawn during her time at Laugh-In.

The British filmmaker Alfred Hitchcock preferred to cast blonde women for major roles in his films as he believed that the audience would suspect them the least, comparing them to "virgin snow that shows up the bloody footprints", hence the term Hitchcock blonde. This stereotype has become so ingrained it has spawned counter-narratives, such as in the 2001 film Legally Blonde in which Elle Woods, played by Reese Witherspoon, succeeds at Harvard despite biases against her beauty and blond hair.

The notion that blonds are less intelligent is not grounded in fact. A 2016 study of 10,878 Americans found that both women and men with natural blond hair had IQ scores similar to the average IQ of non-blond white Americans, and that white women with natural blond hair in fact had a slightly higher average IQ score (103.2) than white women with red hair (101.2), or black hair (100.5). Although many consider blonde jokes to be harmless, the author of the study stated the stereotype can have serious negative effects on hiring, promotion and other social experiences. Rhiannon Williams of The Telegraph writes that dumb blonde jokes are "one of the last 'acceptable' forms of prejudice".

== See also ==
Science

- Ancient North Eurasian
- Disappearing blonde gene
- Human hair color
  - Auburn hair
  - Black hair
  - Brown hair
  - Red hair

Society

- Blonde vs. brunette rivalry
- Blonde stereotype
- Ganguro
- Go Blonde Festival
