= Bjarnar saga Hítdœlakappa =

Icelandic saga

Bjarnar saga Hítdœlakappa (Old Norse pronunciation: [ˈbjarnar ˈsaɣa ˈhiːtˌdøːlaˌkʰapːa]; Modern Icelandic: Bjarnar saga Hítdælakappa Icelandic pronunciation: [ˈpjartnar ˈsaːɣa ˈhiːtˌtajlaˌkʰaʰpa]; The Saga of Bjǫrn, Champion of the Hitardal People, Bjǫrn's saga) is one of the sagas of Icelanders. The text is incomplete and can be found in two parchment manuscripts from the 14th century (AM 162 f, fol.) and two paper manuscripts of the 17th century (AM 551 d alfa 4to).

Bjǫrn, a relative of Egill Skallagrímsson in Egil's Saga, grows up at Borg á Mýrum, the homestead that has passed from Egill to his son and grandson. The main plot of the saga, which takes place near Snæfellsnes between the years 1000 and 1025, and is about the disagreement between Bjǫrn and his rival Thord (Þórðr skáld Kolbeinsson). Thord becomes friends with Bjǫrn in Norway. Thord promises to carry a marriage proposal from Bjǫrn to Oddny (Oddný Þorkelsdóttir), but he falsifies the message, spreads a rumour that Bjǫrn has died, and marries Oddny himself. The story ends after Bjǫrn's death as Thord is sentenced at the Thing (assembly).

== Family relationship ==
Bjǫrn was born in 989. His grandmother was Sæunn Skallagrímsdóttir, making him a great-nephew of the warrior-poet Egill Skallagrímsson. He was fostered at Borg á Mýrum and grew up with Egill's grandson Skúli Þórsteinsson. (Note: Although referred to only obliquely as "Skúli's father" in the saga (e.g. "Skuli and his father gave Bjorn ample funds for the trip."Finlay & Waley 2002, Chap. 2 (p. 154)), Þórsteinn would have been alive and the patriarch of the household in the years of the opening narrative. Þórsteinn was the father of Helga the fair, the woman in the love triangle in Gunnlaugs saga ormstungu.)Finlay & Waley 2002, Chap. 1–2 (pp. 153–4) and notes

== Analysis ==
The saga contains a number of erotic and satirical elements. It is notable for a passage that appears to describe a man being found to possess a woodcut depicting anal sex between two men.

Þess er nú við getit at hlutr sá fannsk í hafnarmarki Þórðar er þvígit vinveittligra þótti. Þat váru karlar tveir ok hafði annarr hǫtt blán á hǫfði. Þeir stóðu lútir ok horfði annarr eptir ǫðrum. Þat þótti illr fundr ok mæltu menn at hvárskis hlutr væri góðr þeirra er þar stóðu ok enn verri er fyrir stóð.

Translation:

Now it is mentioned that an item was found among the possessions that Thord left behind at the shore, an item that was no more friendly. It was two men, and one wore a blue hat on his head. They were leaning over and one was looking over from behind the other. This was considered a terrible find and all were agreed that both parties seen standing there were in a bad position, but the one in front a much worse position still.
