= Hítardalur =

Coordinates: 64.833°N 22.048°W

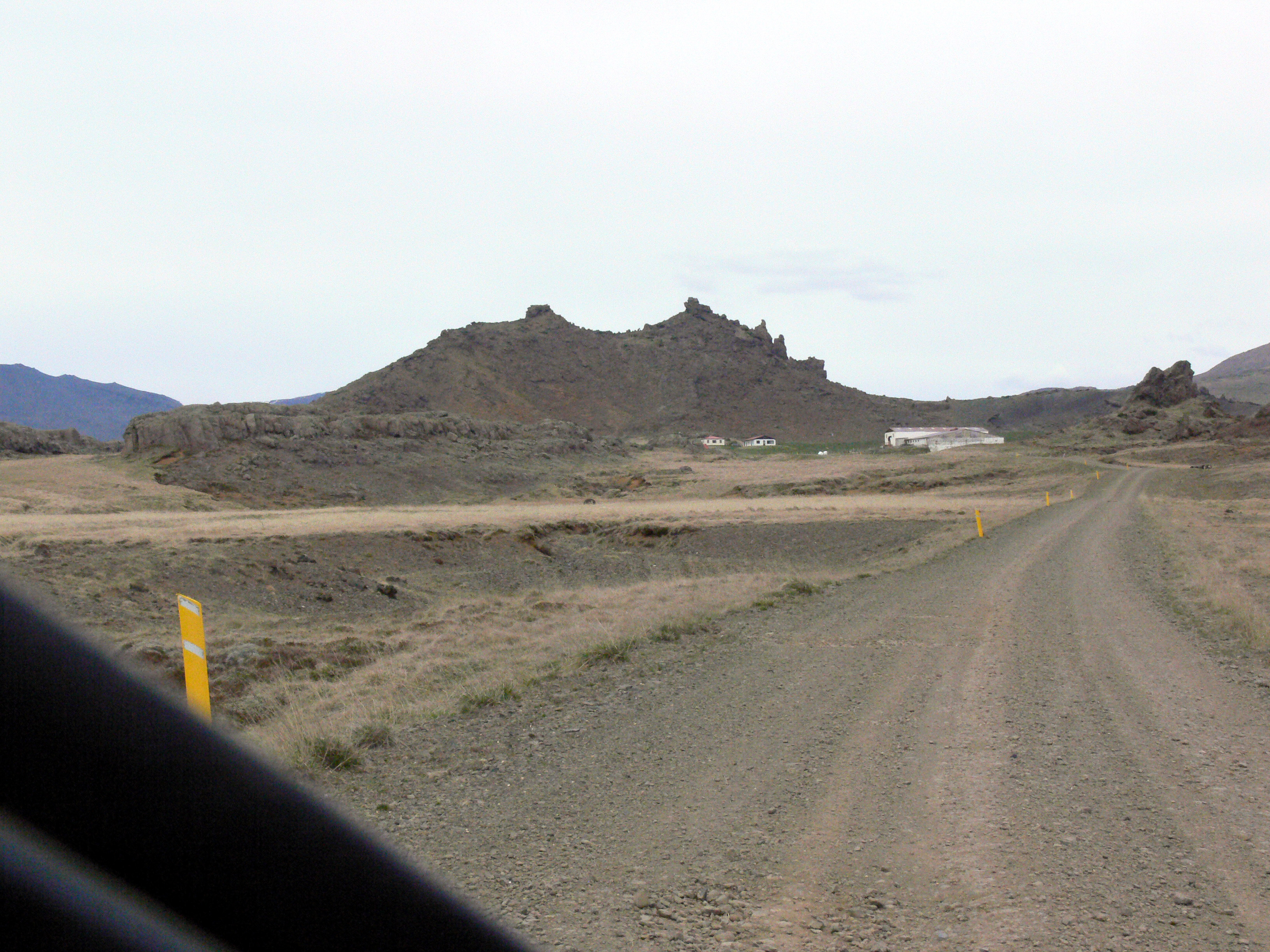
Hítardalur now.

Hítardalur (Icelandic pronunciation: [ˈhiːtarˌtaːlʏr̥]) is a farm and ancient church and rectory estate in Mýrasýslu, Borgarbyggð. The farm estate is situated in Hítardalur valley of the same name, both of which are supposedly named after the ogre Hít who, as the rumour has it, was traveling there along with half-human turned ogre Bárður Snæfellsás. The pair were late returning to their lair in the mountains which they had to reach before the first rays of daylight, and consequently turned into stone, a pair of very specific rock formations still found to be in their place close to the farm houses on the estate.

The original names of the farm and the small fell under which the farm resides, were that of Húsafell, which today is the name of yet another big farm not far away in Borgarbyggð. The name of the fell has for the longest time now been by common consensus Bæjarfell, and the name of the farm estate Hítardalur, is recorded as the name of a place known as to that ofn original settlement claimed by one of Iceland's first settlers, Þórhaddur Steinsson, just after 900 AD, according to the settlers records of Landnáma.

As history has it, very early on there resided a monastery at Hítardalur, but no kept records have been specific as to its size, numbers of occupancy, nor the duration of its operation. What is known though, is that somewhere between the years 1166 and 1201, there was a monastery of the Benedictine order operating on the premises, but very little else is known of or about it, except that it definitely ceases to be and/or exist after 1201.

The history of the purported monastery in Hítardalur is closely connected to the documented and tragic story of one of Iceland's biggest ever, in terms of casualties, accidental house fire at Hítardalur farm. In what must have been a huge blase and the ensuing collapse of buildings, more than 70 people died in that fire, most of whom were dignitaries of the Icelandic church, one of which was the then bishop of Skálholt, his friends and relatives, The bishop and his entourage were there on his regular visit to the diocese, and the guest was there, supposedly, in connection to his visit and subsequent invitation to a feast and banquet.

== See also ==
- Bjarnar saga Hítdœlakappa
