= Go Blonde Festival =

Festival in Latvia

Go Blonde Festival is an annual event held in Riga, Latvia. Blonde women, dressed in pink, parade down the streets of Riga to promote economic growth and to spread cheer. The event is organized by the Latvian Association of Blondes.

The parade has also become a tourist attraction for people who are interested in more than just the city's fine Art Nouveau architecture. It is a tourism generator, rivaling events such as carnivals in Brazil and Italy.

Each year, the festival receives more world attention, and it has grown into the biggest Blondes festival in the world. The previous Go Blonde festivals received international media attention. German national TV Channel One created a documentary about the Latvian Blondes Association. The festival was covered by over 500 internet portals globally, CNN, as well as the popular lifestyle magazines Glamour, Marie Claire in the USA, and Grazia in England and Italy. The festival is also receiving attention from Turkish and Russian media.

In 2012, "Go Blonde” organized the fourth festival, which took place in Jurmala, Latvia, on 13 July. The whole day featured activities on water and on the beach, a Marilyn Monroe lookalike contest, the Miss and Mister Australian Gold beauty pageant finale, tennis and golf tournaments, and a Harley-Davidson bike parade. The festival concluded with an all-night party, with local celebrities present as well as internationally renowned DJs and performers.

== Years ==
=== 2009 ===
- First Festival
- About 500 participants

=== 2010 (May 28th-29th) ===
- About 800 participants

=== 2011 ===
- Over 500 participants registered from abroad, including people from New Zealand, Finland, Italy, and Lithuania.
- Around a thousand people, mostly men, lined the route.
