= Helga the Fair =

Icelandic woman

Helga the Fair was an Icelandic woman whose life and relationships are described in Gunnlaugs saga ormstungu. She is the daughter of Þorsteinn Egilsson and his wife Jofrid, and the granddaughter of Egill Skallagrímsson. Helga is trapped in a love triangle with Gunnlaugr Ormstunga and Hrafn Önundarson, which eventually leads to the men's deaths.

== Life ==
Before Helga's birth, her father has a dream in which two eagles fight and kill each other over a swan. A hawk then comes to the swan and the two fly off together. Thorstein recounts this dream to a Norwegian and the Norwegian interprets the dream to mean that two noble men will come to fight for the hand of Thorstein's future daughter, killing each other in the process. His daughter will then eventually remarry. Thorstein decides that if his wife has a baby girl, she must leave the child to die of exposure, so this prophecy does not come to pass. Thorstein then travels to the Althing and Jofrid has a shepherd girl, Thorvard, take the baby to Egil's daughter, and Helga's aunt, Thorgerd at Hjardarholt.

Six years later, Thorstein is at Hjardarholt for a feast and Thorgerd reveals that one of the girls at the feast is in fact his daughter, Helga. She receives the name Helga the Fair for her exceptional beauty. Thorstein then takes Helga home to his farm at Borg and she was "cherished by her father and mother and all her relatives".

Six years after this, Gunnlaug comes to Thorstein's farm after an argument with his father, where he stays for one year, becoming Helga's playmate and friend. Helga was said to have been the most beautiful woman there had ever been in Iceland. "She had such long hair that it could cover her completely, and it was radiant as beaten gold." Gunnlaug eventually seeks Helga's hand in marriage, and has his father Illugi request Helga's hand for him from Thorstein. Thorstein agrees to promise – but not formally betroth – Helga to Gunnlaug for three years while Gunnlaug goes abroad. After those three years, both Helga and Thorstein would be freed from any obligation regarding the marriage. Gunnlaug travels abroad, and Helga waits for him.

At the Althing, Hrafn requests Helga's hand, and Thorstein decides that if Gunnlaug has not returned by the summer, Hrafn and Helga would be married at Borg at the Winter Nights, but neither Thorstein nor Helga would be obligated to Hrafn if Gunnlaug returned before then. "Helga did not like the arrangement at all." Gunnlaug, meanwhile, is forced by honor to stay at the court of King Ethelred, which costs him Helga to his rival Hrafn. Because Gunnlaug has not returned, Hrafn and Helga are married, but "most people say that the bride was rather gloomy". Hrafn and Helga then move to Mosfell.

One night, Hrafn has a dream and describes it to Helga, as it depicts his murder. Helga says she would not be upset if it were to come true, as she had been tricked into this marriage. Gunnlaug returns to Iceland, and Helga and Hrafn's marriage become strained. The two do not enjoy intimacy after that. At a wedding, Helga gives meaningful looks to Gunnlaug, and Gunnlaug gives Helga a cloak that King Ethelred gave him as a gift to Helga. Gunnlaug and Hrafn get into an argument and decide to duel for Helga. Each rival kills one another.

After some time has passed, Thorstein marries Helga to Thorkel Hallkelsson, but she does not love him, although they had several children together. She truly loved Gunnlaug and spent the rest of her life mourning him. "Helga's greatest pleasure was to unfold the cloak which Gunnlaug had given her and stare at it for a long time." Helga becomes ill, and sits with her head on Thorkel's lap with Gunnlaug's cloak spread in front of her, staring at it. She then died in Thorkel's arms. Helga was taken to the church to be buried, and Thorkel was very grieved by her death.
