= Fag el-Gamous =

Ancient cemetery in Egypt

Fagg El Gamous (translated Way of the Buffalo) is an ancient Egyptian cemetery located in the Faiyum Governorate dating from the 1st to the 7th century AD, the period of Roman rule in Egypt.

The cemetery was discovered by a team of archeologists from Brigham Young University in 1980. They were given sole responsibility for the excavation in 1981.

The excavations are done under time-pressure due to threat of incursion by local farmers who wish to expand their fields across the cemetery.

The skeletons and natural mummies (i.e. not the result of a professional mummification as used for royalty) seem to be common people; "The bodies have been well preserved, so the organs and remains are virtually complete. The preservation results from sealing in the moisture and the atmosphere of the burial spot." By 2014, roughly 1,000 bodies had been excavated at the site.

In 1988, it was noted by the researchers that the graveyard contained an unexpected number of blondes amongst the naturally mummified bodies, as well as oddities in tooth decay amongst the buried; "Of those whose hair was preserved 54% were blondes or redheads, and the percentage grows to 87% when light-brown hair color is added". In 2014, it was revealed that burials seem to be clustered by hair-colour, those with red-hair are in one area, those with blonde hair in another.

== Controversy ==
In 2014, the BYU team claimed that the cemetery contains over a million mummies.

In an e-mail to Newsweek, Kerry Muhlestein explained "In a square that is 5 by 5 meters across and usually just over 2 meters deep, we will typically find about 40 burials. The cemetery is very large and so far seems to maintain that kind of burial density throughout. Thus, the math suggests that there are over a million mummies in the cemetery, though we cannot be certain of this without further exploration and a thorough academic review process."

Scientists, however, are unsure where so many mummies have come from, as the nearby village was too small to house such a huge number of people, while the nearest town of Philadelphia has its own cemetery. The corpses were found buried in deep shafts cut into the limestone rock.

The "million mummies" claim was promptly dismissed by Egyptian authorities, since the data reported to the press by the Brigham Young University team were only an estimate, and furthermore these were referring to burials, not necessarily mummies: indeed, the team has discovered many poorly preserved skeletons, ranging from a person 213 cm tall to an 18-month-old girl's remains, but the only real mummy ever found at Fagg El Gamous was unearthed in 1988.

After working things out with Egyptian authorities, the team was granted renewed permission to excavate in mid January 2015.

== Publications ==
- Excavating a Christian Cemetery Near Selia, in the Fayum Region of Egypt Excavations at Seila, Egypt, ed. C. Wilfred Griggs (1988)
- Rethinking burial dates at a Graeco-Roman Cemetery: Fagg El Gamous, Fayoum, Egypt Journal of Archaeological Science: Reports (2015)
- Photos at Livescience
