= Gunnlaugs saga ormstungu =

Icelandic saga

Gunnlaugs saga ormstunga
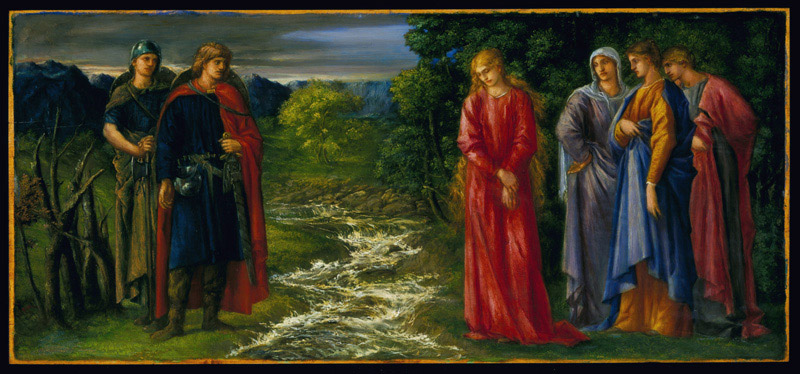
- Gunnlaugur and Helga the Fair meeting by Charles Fairfax Murray

Gunnlaugs saga ormstungu or the Saga of Gunnlaugur Serpent-Tongue is one of the sagas of Icelanders. Composed at the end of the 13th century, it is preserved complete in a slightly younger manuscript. It contains 25 verses of skaldic poetry attributed to the main characters.

It is an important work in both Norwegian and Icelandic literary history. Gunnlaugur is sometimes Anglicized as Gunnlaug. The cognomen can also be translated as Worm-Tongue or Snake-Tongue.

The saga has similarities to earlier sagas of poets, such as Kormáks saga and Bjarnar saga, but it is more refined and elegant with strong characterisation and emotional impact. Long considered a masterpiece, the saga is often read by beginning students of Old Norse literature. Printed with a Latin translation and commentary in 1775, it was the first of the Icelanders' sagas to be published in a scholarly edition.

== Story ==
The saga, said to have taken place around the introduction of Christianity in Iceland, tells the story of two Icelandic poets, Gunnlaugr Ormstunga and Hrafn Önundarson, and their love of Helga the Fair, granddaughter of Egill Skallagrímsson, which results in a competition leading to a deadly duel of honour.

The story opens with a prophetic dream of two eagles who fight over a swan before killing each other. A hawk then arrives to comfort the swan, foreshadowing the rest of the saga and the love triangle element of the story.

The saga then transitions to Gunnlaugr and his upbringing. After Gunnlaugr has an altercation with his father, Illugi the Black, Gunnlaugr rides away to Borg where he meets a farmer, Thorstein, son of Egil Skallagrímsson. Gunnlaugr accepts Thorstein's gracious invitation to stay with him, and he spends a year there studying law. During this year, Gunnlaugr and Helga, Thorstein's daughter, begin a friendship which culminates in them taking a liking for one another. Gunnlaugr then decides to travel abroad, but first asks Thorstein for Helga's hand in marriage—a customary practice in that day. Thorstein quickly rejects Gunnlaugr's proposal because of his decision to travel abroad, but after he and Illugi discuss the matter further they agree that if Gunnlaugr returns in 3 years he can have Helga as his wife.

Despite his feelings for Helga, Gunnlaugr travels to the courts of Northern kings to recite his poetry. He first visits Norway and earl Eric Haakonsson, where his initial poem is received indifferently. Gunnlaugr eventually is banished from the country after Gunnlaugr replies to the Earl's followers with disrespect, further cementing his nickname of "Serpent-Tongue". Gunnlaugr quickly leaves Norway and heads to England, where King Æthelred rewards Gunnlaugr handsomely for his poem with a cloak of scarlet and requests that he return next autumn. After this, Gunnlaugr travels to Ireland and the court of Sigtrygg Silkbeard. The king has no idea what the proper reward for a poem is, and initially offers a lavish prize before he is counseled to give a more reasonable gift of scarlet clothes, an embroidered tunic, a cloak lined with exquisite furs, and a gold bracelet. Next to be visited is Orkney, where Gunnlaugr receives an axe from Earl Sigurd Hlodvirsson. After this comes Sweden, where Gunnlaugr recites a poem in praise of the Norwegian earl Eiríkr, who finally appreciates Gunnlaugr's verses.

To cement his relationship with Æthelred Gunnlaugr returns to England. He is delayed for the winter before heading to Sweden to visit King Óláfr Skötkonung. Here Gunnlaugr meets Hrafn Önundarson—the antagonist of the saga. Each of them recites a poem for the king, and is told to discuss the other's poem. They both respond by making back-handed comments, resulting in a falling out. Hrafn then returns to Iceland, where he discusses with Skafti the Lawspeaker the possibility of asking Thorstein for Helga's hand in marriage. Skafti references the agreement between Gunnlaugr and Thorstein previously made, but Hrafn ignores the objection and says that Gunnlaug is so proud these days that he "won’t take any notice of this or care about it at all". After Hrafn and Skafti discuss the issue with Illugi and Thorstein, they agree that if Gunnlaugr breaks his vow of returning after three years to claim his wife, Hrafn then has permission to marry Helga.

The story then transitions back to Gunnlaugr and his adventures abroad, where he fulfills his oath to King Æthelred and returns to England. At the king's insistence, Gunnlaugr stays an extra summer in England, which ultimately causes his original agreement with Thorstein to be void. Gunnlaugr returns to Iceland too late to stop the marriage, and consequently Gunnlaugr and Hrafn become embroiled in a bitter rivalry. It is apparent throughout the wedding that Helga still possesses feelings for Gunnlaugr. After the ceremony, Gunnlaugr approaches Helga and they talk for a while. Their talk concludes with Gunnlaugr giving the cloak King Æthelred gave to him to his beloved Helga.

With Gunnlaugr returning to Iceland, Helga loses all interest in Hrafn, causing him increasing disdain for the tragic hero. They first compete in verse and later in battle. After their first altercation ends anticlimactically, Hrafn and Gunnlaugr agree to travel to Norway to end their dispute once and for all. Dueling became outlawed after their first physical altercation. Their feud in Norway continues, with Gunnlaugr cutting off Hrafn's leg. Hrafn, in one final act of spite, tricks Gunnlaugr into lowering his guard and mortally wounds Gunnlaugr before he is ultimately defeated. Gunnlaugr dies a short time later and Helga is married off to another poet named Thorkel, fulfilling the prophecy. Helga dies a little later, gazing at the cloak that Gunnlaugr gave her.

== Court culture and gift-giving ==
The Saga of Gunnlaugr Serpent-Tongue is the strongest example among the Icelandic sagas of court culture and the culture of gift giving in the late Viking Age. The exchange of gifts was common in many parts of Viking society outside of court culture as a means of settling disputes and showing respect, but gift-giving in a court context had a special significance in Viking culture. Making expeditions from Iceland to Norway and England travelling to the courts of wealthy and powerful men and offering them gifts was a way to gain favour with influential people and make a name for one's self. Honor was a crucial part of one's character in this society, and most interactions were based on people's reputations and the honour that they had accrued over their lifetime, so it was a constant struggle to increase one's honour to make one's life easier. By giving gifts to an earl or a king, the honour of both the giver and the receiver are increased.

When a visitor to a court comes bearing a gift, it is usually something unique or significant that is intended to catch the eye of both the receiver and anyone who enters their court. In Gunnlaug's saga, Gunnlaug gives the gift of poetry to the leaders of the courts he visits. Poetry was greatly respected during this time because it was not only an art form that could be dedicated to a specific person, but if the poem was good enough and happened to speak well of its subject, then there was a chance that it would be remembered and recited for generations, carrying on the story of the person for whom it was written. In another saga, Audun of The West Fjords, Audun brings the gift of a polar bear from Greenland to a Danish king, and gains much honour as well as material wealth because of the rarity and extravagance of his gift.

Because honour played such a large role in these transactions, the heads of court who would be receiving these gifts were obliged to reciprocate these gifts in one form or another for a number of reasons. In Viking culture, people in power often maintained their positions of power by maintaining favour with their subjects, usually by hosting large feasts and ensuring their well-being in terms of food and shelter. The most important part of this was being willing to be conspicuous with one's wealth, sharing it with the people who supported you, and if a visitor comes from far away with a specific gift to pay tribute to you, it would be in the leader's best interest to repay their gift, showing that not only were they being honourable by repaying a gift, but these leaders would often attempt to go above and beyond in their gift-giving to bolster their reputation and forge strong relationships with new people. The remnants of this culture can still be seen in Iceland today with a culture of charitable donations.

== Popular culture ==
Gunnlaugs saga ormstungu has served as inspiration for a number of modern literary works. This includes Friedrich de la Motte Fouqué's novel Die Saga von dem Gunnlaugur (1826) and Karl Bleibtreu's novel Gunnlaug Schlangenzunge: Eine Inselmär (1879). Poetic works inspired by the saga include Walter Savage Landor's Gunlaug (1806), Kristian Arentzen's Gunlög Ormetunge (1852), and Anton Edzardi's Schön-Helga und Gunnlaug (1875). Benedikt Erlingsson's Ormstunga: ástarsaga (2003) is a dramatic adaptation of the saga.

== Editions ==
Gunnlaugs saga was first printed in Copenhagen in 1775 by Frederik Christian Godiche, in an edition edited by Jón Eiríksson (baekur.is). The edition featured a facing-page Latin translation of the text. Modern editions include:

- Gunnlaugs saga ormstungu, text in modern Icelandic spelling at Netútgáfan
- Gunnlaugssaga Ormstungu, Edited from the Stockholm and Copenhagen Manuscripts, ed. by L. M. Small, Leeds School of English Language Texts and Monographs, 1 (Leeds: School of English Language, University of Leeds, 1935).
- Gunnlaugs saga ormstungu, ed. by Eugen Mogk, 2nd edn, Altnordische Texte, 1 (Halle a. S.: Niemeyer, 1908)

=== Facsimiles ===
- The Saga of Gunnlaug Serpent-Tongue, and three other sagas: Perg. 4:0 nr 18 in the Royal Library, Stockholm, ed. by Bjarni Einarsson, Early Icelandic Manuscripts in Facsimile, 16 (Copenhagen: Rosenkilde and Bagger, 1986).

== Translations ==
=== Translations ===
- "The Saga of Gunnlaug Serpent-Tongue" translated by Katrina C. Attwood in The Sagas of Icelanders edited by Örnólfur Thorsson (2001), pp. 558–94. Penguin Books. ISBN 0-14-100003-1
- 'The Story of Gunnlaug the Worm-Tongue and Raven the Skald', in Three Northern Love Stories and Other Tales, trans. by Eiríkur Magnússon and William Morris (London: Ellis & White, 1875), pp. 1–64 [repr. in blackletter as a single volume as The story of Gunnlaug the Worm-tongue and Raven the Skald: even as Ari Thorgilson the Learned, the Priest, Hath Told it, Who Was the Man of All Iceland Most Learned in Tales of the Land's Inhabiting and in Lore of Time Agone (Chiswick: Chiswick Press, 1891), Project Guternberg; archive.org
- Whaley, Diana (2002) Sagas of Warrior-Poets (Penguin) ISBN 978-0140447712
- Hreinsson, Vidar (1997) The Complete Sagas of Icelanders (Leifur Eiriksson Publishing) ISBN 978-9979929307

== See also ==
- Holmgang
