= Jewish humor =

Wit and humor in Jewish culture

Jewish humor dates back to the compilation of Talmud and Midrash. In the Jewish community of the Holy Roman Empire, theological satire was a traditional way to clandestinely express opposition to Christianization.

During the nineteenth century, modern Jewish humor emerged among German-speaking Jewish proponents of the Haskalah (Jewish Enlightenment), it matured in the shtetls of the Russian Empire, and then, it flourished in twentieth-century America, arriving with the millions of Jews who emigrated from Eastern Europe between the 1880s and the early 1920s. Beginning on vaudeville and continuing on radio, stand-up, film, and television, a disproportionately high percentage of American comedians have been Jewish. Time estimated in 1978 that 80 percent of professional American comics were Jewish.

Jewish humor is diverse, but most frequently, it consists of wordplay, irony, and satire, and the themes of it are highly anti-authoritarian, mocking religious and secular life alike. Sigmund Freud considered Jewish humor unique in that its humor is primarily derived from mocking the in-group (Jews) rather than the Other. However, rather than simply being self-deprecating, it also contains an element of self-praise.

== History ==
Jewish humor is rooted in several traditions. Jewish humor can be found in one of history's earliest recorded documents, the Hebrew Bible, as well as the Talmud. In particular, the intellectual and legal methods of the Talmud, which uses elaborate legal arguments and situations often seen as so absurd as to be humorous, in order to tease out the meaning of religious law. For example:

The Mishnah states: If a fledgling bird is found within fifty cubits of a dovecote, it belongs to the owner of the dovecote. If it is found outside the limit of fifty cubits, it belongs to the person who finds it. ...

Rabbi Jeremiah asked: If one foot of the fledgling is within fifty cubits and one foot is outside of it, what is the law?

It was for this question that Rabbi Jeremiah was thrown out of the House of Study

-- Talmud (Bava Batra 23b)

A Sephardic tradition is centered on a Nasreddin-derived folk character who is known as Djoha.

A more recent tradition which originated in the Jewish communities of Eastern Europe is an egalitarian tradition in which the powerful were frequently mocked subtly, rather than attacked overtly—as Saul Bellow once put it, "Oppressed people tend to be witty." Jesters known as badchens used to poke fun at prominent members of the community during weddings, creating a good-natured tradition of humor as a levelling device. Rabbi Moshe Waldoks, a scholar of Jewish humor, argued:

You have a lot of shtoch, or jab humor, which is usually meant to deflate pomposity or ego, and to deflate people who consider themselves high and mighty. But Jewish humor was also a device for self-criticism within the community, and I think that's where it really was the most powerful. The humorist, like the prophet, would basically take people to task for their failings. The humor of Eastern Europe especially was centered on defending the poor against the exploitation of the upper classes or other authority figures, so rabbis were made fun of, authority figures were made fun of and rich people were made fun of. It really served as a social catharsis.

After Jews began to migrate to America in large numbers, they, like other minority groups, found it difficult to gain mainstream acceptance and obtain upward mobility. The development of the entertainment industry, combined with the tradition of Jewish humor, provided a potential route where Jews could succeed. One of the first successful radio "sitcoms", The Goldbergs, featured a Jewish family. As radio and television matured, many of its most famous comedians, including Eddie Cantor, Jack Benny, George Burns, Henny Youngman, Milton Berle, Jack Carter, Sid Caesar, Jerry Lewis, and Joan Rivers, were Jewish. The Jewish comedy tradition continues today, with Jewish humor much entwined with mainstream humor, as comedies like Seinfeld, Curb Your Enthusiasm, and Woody Allen films indicate.. The series Difficult People, starring Jewish comedians Julie Klausner and Billy Eichner, incorporates elements of Jewish humor, as does Emma Seligman’s 2020 film Shiva Baby.

In his essay, Jokes and their Relation to the Unconscious, Sigmund Freud analyzes the nature of Jewish jokes, among other things.

== Types ==
=== Religious humor ===
Because religion was such an important part of life in Jewish communities, much of the humor which was developed in them is centered on the relationship between Judaism, the individual Jew and the Jewish community as a whole.

Two Rabbis argued late into the night about the existence of God, and, using strong arguments from the scriptures, ended up indisputably disproving His existence. The next day, one Rabbi was surprised to see the other walking into the shul for morning services.

"I thought we had agreed there was no God," he said.

"Yes, what does that have to do with it?" replied the other.

The part left out is the fact that it was traditional to go to services, regardless of what one believed, and the rabbi was merely following that tradition. This is like the story of the boy who tells his rabbi he cannot daven (pray) because he no longer believes in God. The rabbi merely tells him, "Yes God, no God: doesn't matter! Three times a day, you DAVEN!"

==== Assimilation ====
The American Jewish community has been lamenting the rate of assimilation among its children and it has also been lamenting the absence of them as they grow into adulthood.

Two Rabbis were discussing their problems with squirrels in their synagogue attic. One Rabbi said, "We simply called an exterminator and we never saw the squirrels again." The other Rabbi said, "We just gave the squirrels a bar mitzvah, and we never saw them again."

==== Self-deprecating ====
Jews often mock their own negative stereotypes.

Question: How can you always spot a convert to Judaism?
Answer: That's easy. They're the only normal ones in the congregation.

==== Wit ====
In the tradition of the legal arguments of the Talmud, one prominent type of Jewish humor involves clever, often legalistic, solutions to Talmudic problems, such as:

Q: Is one permitted to ride in an airplane on the Sabbath?

A: Yes, as long as your seat belt remains fastened. In this case, it is considered that you are not riding, you are wearing the plane.

==== Tales of the Rebbes ====
Some jokes make fun of the "Rebbe miracle stories" and involve different Hasidim bragging about their teachers' miraculous abilities:

Three Hasidim are bragging about their Rebbes: "My rebbe is very powerful. He was walking once, and there was a big lake in his path. He waved his handkerchief, and there was lake on the right, lake on the left, but no lake in the middle." To which the second retorted, "That's nothing. My rebbe is even more powerful. He was walking once, and there was a huge mountain in his path. He waved his handkerchief, and there was mountain on the right, mountain on the left, but no mountain in the middle!" Said the third, "Ha! That is still nothing! My rebbe is the most powerful. He was walking once on Shabbos (Saturday, the holy day in Judaism, on which it is forbidden to handle money), and there was a wallet crammed full of cash in his path. He waved his handkerchief, and it was Shabbos on the right, Shabbos on the left, but not Shabbos in the middle!"

Or:

Caesar said to Joshua ben Hananiah "Why does the Sabbath dish have such a fragrant odor?" Joshua said "We have a certain spice called Shabbat (shevet), that we put in it." "Let me have some", he requested. Joshua replied, "For those who observe Shabbat, it works; for those who don't, it doesn't."

— Shabbat 119a.

=== Eastern European Jewish humor ===
A number of traditions in Jewish humor date back to stories and anecdotes from the 19th century.

==== Chełm ====
Jewish folklore makes fun of the Jewish residents of Chełm (Yiddish: כעלעם, Hebrew: חלם; often transcribed as Helm) in eastern Poland for their foolishness. These stories often center on the "wise" men and their silly decisions, similarly to the English Wise Men of Gotham or the German Schildbürger. The jokes are almost always about silly solutions to problems. Some of these solutions display "foolish wisdom" (reaching the correct answer by the wrong train of reasoning), while others are simply wrong.

Many of these stories have become well-known thanks to storytellers and writers such as Isaac Bashevis Singer, a Nobel Prize-winning Jewish writer in the Yiddish language, who wrote The Fools of Chełm and Their History (published in English translation in 1973), and the great Soviet Yiddish poet Ovsey Driz who wrote stories in verse. The latter achieved great popularity in the Soviet Union in Russian and Ukrainian translations, and were made into several animated films.

Other notable adaptations of folklore Chełm stories into the mainstream culture are the comedy Chelmer Chachomim ("The Wise Men of Chełm") by Aaron Zeitlin, The Heroes of Chelm (1942) by Shlomo Simon, published in English translation as The Wise Men of Helm (Solomon Simon, 1945) and More Wise Men of Helm (Solomon Simon, 1965), and the book Chelmer Chachomim by Y. Y. Trunk. The animated short film comedy Village of Idiots also recounts Chełm tales.

Allen Mandelbaum's Chelmaxioms : The Maxims, Axioms, Maxioms of Chelm (David R. Godine, 1978) treats the wise men less as fools than as an "echt Chelm" of true scholars who in their narrow specialized knowledge are nonetheless knowledgeable but lacking sense. The poetry of Chelmaxioms is supposedly the discovered lost manuscripts of the wise men of Chełm.

Here are a few examples of a Chełm tale:

It is said that after God made the world, he filled it with people. He sent off an angel with two sacks, one full of wisdom and one full of foolishness. The second sack was much heavier. So after a time it started to drag. Soon it got caught on a mountaintop and so all the foolishness spilled out and fell into Chełm.

One Jewish Chełm resident bought a fish on Friday in order to cook it for Sabbath. He put the live fish underneath his coat and the fish slapped his face with its tail. He went to the Chełm court to submit a charge and the court sentenced the fish to death by drowning.

In Chełm, the shammes used to go around waking everyone up for minyan (communal prayer) in the morning. Every time it snowed, the people would complain that, although the snow was beautiful, they could not see it in its pristine state because by the time they got up in the morning, the shammes had already trekked through the snow. The townspeople decided that they had to find a way to be woken up for minyan without having the shammes making tracks in the snow.
The people of Chełm hit on a solution: they got four volunteers to carry the shammes around on a table when there was fresh snow in the morning. That way, the shammes could make his wake up calls, but he would not leave tracks in the snow.

The town of Chełm decided to build a new synagogue. So, some strong, able-bodied men were sent to a mountaintop to gather heavy stones for the foundation. The men put the stones on their shoulders and trudged down the mountain to the town below. When they arrived, the town constable yelled, "Foolish men! You should have rolled the stones down the mountain!" The men agreed this was an excellent idea. So they turned around, and with the stones still on their shoulders, trudged back up the mountain, and rolled the stones back down again.

==== Hershele Ostropoler ====
Hershele Ostropoler, also known as Hershel of Ostropol, was a legendary prankster who was based on a historic figure. Thought to have come from Ukraine, he lived in the small village of Ostropol, working as shochet, a ritual slaughterer. According to legend he lost his job because of his constant joking, which offended the leaders of the village.

In his subsequent wanderings throughout Ukraine, he became a familiar figure at restaurants and inns.

Eventually he settled down at the court of Rabbi Boruch of Medzhybizh, grandson of the Baal Shem Tov. The rabbi was plagued by frequent depressions, and Hershele served as a sort of court jester, mocking the rabbi and his cronies, to the delight of the common folk.

After his death he was remembered in a series of pamphlets recording his tales and witty remarks.

He was the subject of several epic poems, a novel, a comedy performed in 1930 by the Vilna Troupe, and a U.S. television programme in the 1950s. Two illustrated children's books, The Adventures of Hershel of Ostropol, and Hershel and the Hanukkah Goblins, have been published. Both books were written by Eric Kimmel and illustrated by Trina Schart Hyman. In 2002, a play entitled Hershele the Storyteller was performed in New York City. He is also the protagonist in a new series of comics for children with the titles The Adventures of Hershele, Hershele Rescues the Captives, Hershele and the Treasure in Yerushalayim, Hershele makes the Grade, and Hershele Discovers America.

=== Humor about antisemitism ===
Much Jewish humor takes the form of self-deprecating comments on Jewish culture, acting as a shield against antisemitic stereotypes by exploiting them first:

Rabbi Altmann and his secretary were sitting in a coffeehouse in Berlin in 1935. "Herr Altmann," said his secretary, "I notice you're reading Der Stürmer! I can't understand why. A Nazi libel sheet! Are you some kind of masochist, or, God forbid, a self-hating Jew?"
"On the contrary, Frau Epstein. When I used to read the Jewish papers, all I learned about were pogroms, riots in Palestine, and assimilation in America. But now that I read Der Stürmer, I see so much more: that the Jews control all the banks, that we dominate in the arts, and that we're on the verge of taking over the entire world. You know – it makes me feel a whole lot better!"

Or, on a similar note:

After the assassination of Tsar Alexander II of Russia, a government official in Ukraine menacingly addressed the local rabbi, "I suppose you know in full detail who was behind it."

"Ach," the rabbi replied, "I have no idea, but the government's conclusion will be the same as always: they will blame the Jews and the chimneysweeps."
"Why the chimneysweeps?" asked the befuddled official.

"Why the Jews?" responded the rabbi.

Another example features gallows humor:

During the days of oppression and poverty of the Russian shtetls, one village had a rumor going around: a Christian girl was found murdered near their village. Fearing a pogrom, they gathered at the synagogue. Suddenly, the rabbi came running up, and cried, "Wonderful news! The murdered girl was Jewish!"

This one combines accusations of the lack of patriotism, and avarice:

Post-Soviet Russia. Rabinovich calls the Pamyat headquarters: "Is it true that we Jews sold out Mother Russia?" "Damn right, you filthy kike!" "Oh good. Could you tell me where I might get my share?"

=== American Jewish humor ===
A 2013 survey by the Pew Research Center found that 42 percent of American Jews rated humor as essential to their Jewish identity.

==== About religion ====
One common strain of Jewish humor examines the role of religion in contemporary life, often gently mocking the religious hypocrite. For example:

A Reform Rabbi was so compulsive a golfer that once, on Yom Kippur, he left the house early and went out for a quick nine holes by himself. An angel who happened to be looking on immediately notified his superiors that a grievous sin was being committed. On the sixth hole, God caused a mighty wind to take the ball directly from the tee to the cup – a miraculous shot.

The angel was horrified. "A hole in one!" he exclaimed, "You call this a punishment, Lord?!"

Answered God with a sly smile, "So who can he tell?"

Or, on differences between Orthodox, Conservative and Reform movements:

An Orthodox, a Conservative, and a Reform rabbi are each asked whether one is supposed to say a beracha (blessing) over a lobster (non-kosher food, normally not eaten by religious Jews).
The Orthodox rabbi asks, "What is this...'lobster'...thing?" The Conservative rabbi doesn't know what to say, muttering about responsa. The Reform rabbi says, "What's a beracha?"

In particular, Reform Jews may be lampooned for their rejection of traditional Jewish beliefs. An example, from one of Woody Allen's early stand-up routines:

We were married by a Reform rabbi in Long Island. A very Reform rabbi. A Nazi.

Jokes have been made about the shifting of gender roles (in the more traditional Orthodox movement, women marry at a young age and have many children, while the more liberal Conservative and Reform movements make gender roles more egalitarian, even ordaining women as Rabbis). The Reconstructionist movement was the first to ordain homosexuals, all of which leads to this joke:

At an Orthodox wedding, the bride's mother is pregnant. At a Conservative wedding, the bride is pregnant. At a Reform wedding, the rabbi is pregnant. At a Reconstructionist wedding, the rabbi and her wife are both pregnant.

The following joke refers to Jewish congregational rivalry and splitting.

A Jew is rescued from a desert island after 20 years. The rescuers see his house and two synagogues. "Why two?" - they ask. - "In this synagogue I daven, and that one, I never step my foot in."

==== About Jews ====
Jewish humor continues to exploit stereotypes of Jews, both as a sort of "in-joke", and as a form of self-defence. Jewish mothers, "cheapness"/frugality, kvetching, and other stereotyped habits are all common subjects. Frugality has been frequently singled out:

An old Jewish schnorrer was out on the street in New York City with his tin cup.

"Please, sir," he pleaded to a passerby, "could you spare seventy-three cents for a cup of coffee and some pie?"
The man asked, "Where do you get coffee and pie for seventy-three cents in New York? It costs at least a dollar!"

The beggar replied, "Who buys retail?"

Or,

A Catholic priest, a Reverend, and a Rabbi are discussing their income.

The Priest says: "I draw a circle on the ground, take the offering, and throw it up into the air. Any money that falls outside the circle is for the Lord, and the money that falls inside the circle is for me."
The Reverend says: "I do things almost the same, except the money that falls outside the circle is my salary, and the money that falls inside the circle is for the Lord."

The Rabbi says: "I do things quite different. I take the offering, throw it up into the air, and pray: "Lord, take whatever is Yours."

Or,

Did you hear they built the first Starbucks in Israel? There's a fork in the sugar bowl.

Or,

A Buddhist monk goes to a barber to have his head shaved. "What should I pay you?" the monk asks. "No price, for a holy man such as yourself," the barber replies. And what do you know, the next day the barber comes to open his shop, and finds on his doorstep a dozen gemstones.

Later that day, a priest comes in to have his hair cut. "What shall I pay you, my son?" "No price, for a man of the cloth such as yourself." And what do you know, the next day the barber comes to open his shop, and finds on his doorstep a dozen roses.

Later that day, Rabbi Finklestein comes in to get his payot trimmed. "What do you want I should pay you?" "Nothing, for a man of God such as yourself." And the next morning, what do you know? The barber finds on his doorstep – a dozen rabbis!

Or,

A Jewish man lies on his deathbed, surrounded by his children. "Ah," he says, "I can smell your mother's brisket – how I would love to taste it one last time before I die." So one of his sons hurries down to the kitchen, but he returns empty-handed.
"Sorry, papa. She says it's for the shiva (mourning period)."

Or, about traditional roles of men and women in Jewish families:

A boy comes home from school and tells his mother he got a part in the school play.

"That's wonderful!" says the mother, "Which part?"
"The part of a Jewish husband," says the boy, proudly.

Frowning, the mother says, "Go back and tell them you want a speaking role!"

Or,

A Jewish girl bemoans, "Finally, I meet a nice, rich Jewish boy! He's just like papa. He looks like him. He acts like him. Oy vey, mama hates him!"

Or

"Sarah, how's that boy of yours?"

"David? Ach, don't ask – he's living in Miami with a man named Miguel."
"That's terrible!"

"I know – why couldn't he find a nice Jewish boy?"

Or

Miriam and Sharon, long-time friends, are catching up on one another's lives by telephone.

"But that's enough about me," says Miriam. "I hear your son Isaac has a very successful neurology practice in Brooklyn!"
"Yes, yes," says Sharon. "I could kvell for days."
Continues Miriam, "And that's to say nothing of Reuven. Our first Jewish President of the United States... and he's your son!!"

"Ah yes," replies Sharon, disappointment creeping into her voice. "Reuven... the one who's not a doctor."

Or, on kvetching (complaining),

A Jewish man in a hospital tells the doctor he wants to be transferred to a different hospital.

The doctor says "What's wrong? Is it the food?"
"No, the food is fine. I can't kvetch."
"Is it the room?"
"No, the room is fine. I can't kvetch."
"Is it the staff?"
"No, everyone on the staff is fine. I can't kvetch."
"Then why do you want to be transferred?"

"I can't kvetch!"

What did the waiter ask the group of dining Jewish mothers? "Pardon me ladies, but is anything all right?"

A version of the following joke is quoted in Born To Kvetch: Yiddish Language and Culture in All Its Moods, by Michael Wex:

An old Jewish man riding on a train begins to moan: "Oy, am I thirsty; oy, am I thirsty", to the annoyance of the other passengers. Finally, another passenger gets a cup of water from the drinking fountain and gives it to the old man, who thanks him profusely and gulps it down. Feeling satisfied, the other passenger sits down again, only to hear "Oy, was I thirsty; oy, was I thirsty".

Wex comments:

"It contains virtually every important element of the Yiddish-speaking mind-set in easily accessible form: the constant tension between the Jewish and the non-Jewish; the faux naivete that allows the old man to pretend that he isn't disturbing anyone; the deflation of the other passenger's hopes, the disappointment of all his expectations after he has watered the Jew; and most importantly of all, the underlying assumption, the fundamental idea that kvetching—complaining—is not only a pastime, not only a response to adverse or imperfect circumstance, but a way of life that has nothing to do with the fulfillment or frustration of desire."

==== About Christianity ====
Many Jewish jokes involve a rabbi and a Christian clergyman, exploiting different interpretations of a shared environment. Often they start with something like "A rabbi and a priest..." and make fun of either the rabbi's interpretation of Christianity or (seeming) differences between Christian and Jewish interpretation of some areas.

A Catholic priest says to a rabbi, "It seems to me that, since the Creator made pork, He must have made it for some purpose. Therefore, it must be a sin not to use it, don't you think? So, will you finally eat some pork?"
The rabbi replies, "I will try some, Father – at your wedding."

A rabbi, a minister, and a priest were playing poker when the police raided the game.

Turning to the priest, the lead police officer said, "Father Murphy, were you gambling?" Turning his eyes to heaven, the priest whispered, "Lord, forgive me for what I am about to do." To the police officer, he then said, "No, officer; I was not gambling." The officer then asked the minister, "Pastor Johnson, were you gambling?" Again, after an appeal to heaven, the minister replied, "No, officer; I was not gambling." Turning to the rabbi, the officer again asked, "Rabbi Goldstein, were you gambling?"

Shrugging his shoulders, the rabbi replied, "With whom?"

=== Jewish humor in the Soviet Union ===
See Russian jokes in general, or more specifically Rabinovich jokes, Russian Jewish jokes, Russian political jokes; also History of the Jews in Russia and the Soviet Union.

Q: Rabinovich, what is a fortune?
A: A fortune is to live in our Socialist motherland.
Q: And what's a misfortune?
A: A misfortune is to have such a "fortune".

Or, in the last years of the Soviet Union:

Q: Comrade Lev, why now, just when things are getting better for your people, are you applying for an exit visa to make aliyah to Israel?
A: Well, comrade, there are two reasons. One is that my next-door neighbor is Pamyat and he tells me that after they get rid of you communists, they are coming next after the Jews.
Q: But they will never get rid of us communists!
A: I know, I know, of course you are right! And that's the other reason.

Or

An old Jewish man was finally allowed to leave the Soviet Union, to emigrate to Israel. When he was searched at the Moscow airport, the customs official found a bust of Lenin.

Customs: What is that?
Old man: What is that? What is that?! Don't say "What is that?" say "Who is that?" That is Lenin! The genius who thought up this worker's paradise!
The official laughed and let the old man through.
The old man arrived at Tel Aviv airport, where an Israeli customs official found the bust of Lenin.
Customs: What is that?
Old man: What is that? What is that?! Don't say "What is that?" say "Who is that?" That is Lenin! The sonofabitch! I will put him on display in my toilet for all the years he prevented an old man from coming home.
The official laughed and let him through.
When he arrived at his family's house in Jerusalem, his grandson saw him unpack the bust.
Grandson: Who is that?
Old man: Who is that? Who is that?! Don't say "Who is that?" say "What is that?" That, my child, is eight pounds of gold!

=== Israeli humor ===
Israeli humor featured many of the same themes as Jewish humor elsewhere, making fun of the country and its habits, while containing a fair bit of gallows humor as well, as a joke from a 1950 Israeli joke book indicates:

An elderly man refuses to leave for the air raid shelter until he can find his dentures. His wife yells at him, "What, you think they are dropping sandwiches?"

Israelis' view of themselves:

A man dies and comes up to the heavenly court to be judged. An angel informs him that he has to serve some time in hell, but not to worry, he can choose between three different hells: French hell, American hell and Israeli hell. Asks the man: "What's the difference?" Answers the angel: "Well, in French hell, everyone spends the day walking along the boulevards and feasting in bistros. Then, at midnight, everyone is placed in the most boiling-hot water until morning." The man: "Oy, sounds terrible." The angel: "It is." The man: "So what's American hell?" The angel: "Well, in American hell, everyone spends the day watching movies and eating fast-food. Then, at midnight, everyone is placed in the most boiling-hot water until morning." The man: "Oy, sounds terrible." The angel: "It is." The man: "So what's Israeli hell?" The angel: "Well, in Israeli hell, you live on a kibbutz: you wake up at dawn to work all day in the fields, at lunch you get some bread and cheese. Then, at midnight, everyone is placed in the most boiling-hot water until morning." The man: "That sounds horrible, why would anyone want Israeli hell?"

The angel: "'Midnight' isn't exactly midnight...the water isn't exactly hot...we could probably work out some sort of deal and maybe get you a schnitzel..."

== Role of Yiddish ==
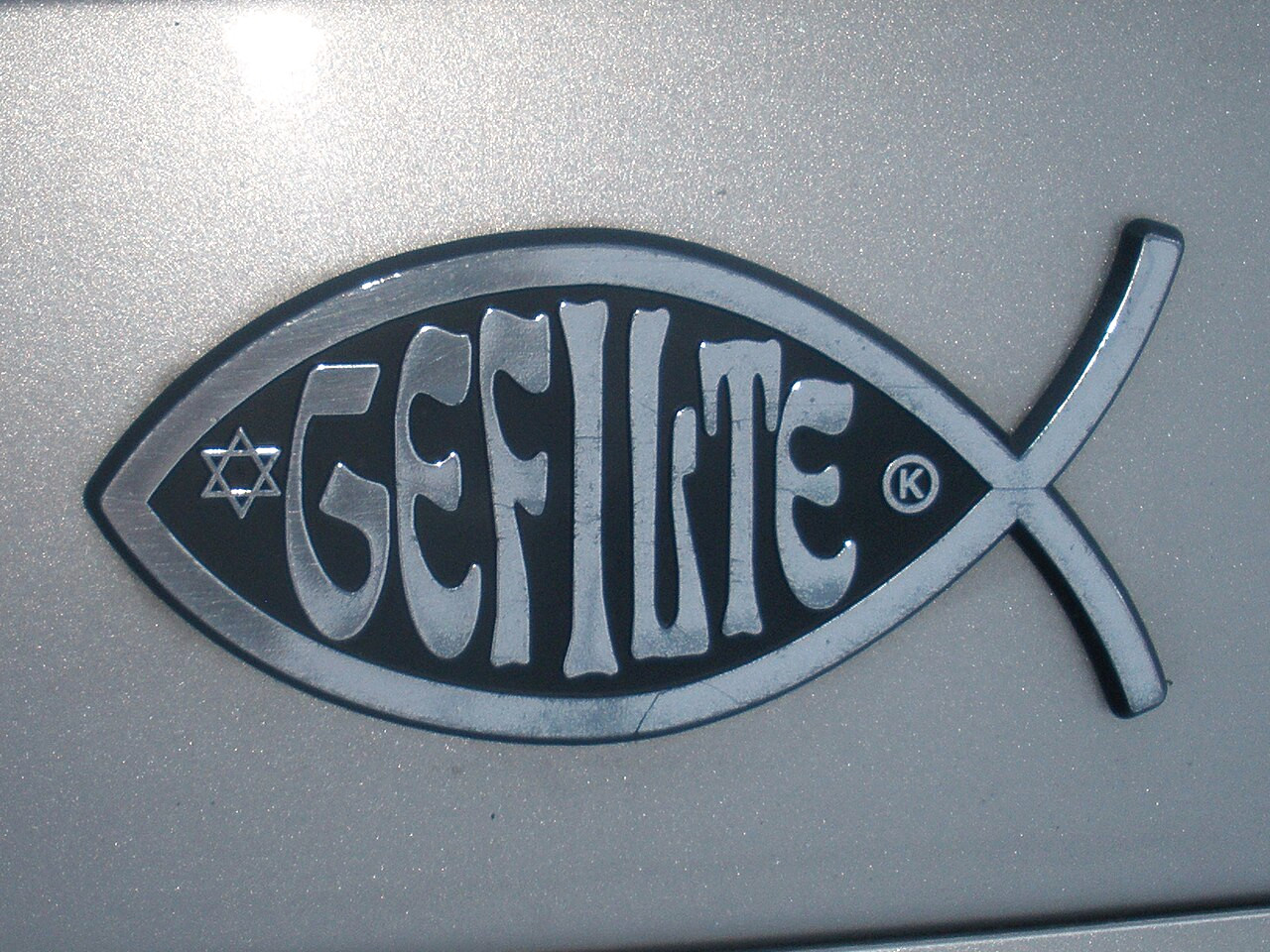
"Gefilte fish" on a car, a humorous parody of the fish symbol

Some Yiddish words may sound comical to an English speaker. Terms like shnook and shmendrik, shlemiel and shlimazel (often considered inherently funny words) were exploited for their humorous sounds, as were "Yinglish" shm-reduplication constructs, such as "fancy-schmancy". Yiddish constructions—such as ending sentences with questions—became part of the verbal word play of Jewish comedians.

== See also ==
- Happiness in Judaism
- Ethnic joke
- List of American Jewish comedians
- The Bible and humor
- Holocaust humor
- Category:Purim humor
