= Hershel of Ostropol =

Jewish prankster (1757–1811)

Hershel of Ostropol (Yiddish: הערשעלע אסטראפאלער, romanized: Hershele Ostropoler, Little Hersh of Ostropol; 1757–1811) is a prominent figure in Jewish humor. Hershel was a badchen from Ostropol, Crown Poland (now Ukraine), who lived in poverty and targeted the rich and powerful, both Jew and Gentile. Common folks were not safe from his shenanigans, either, but usually got off lightly. He is also remembered by Ukrainian Gentiles as something of an ethnic folk hero, who could take on establishment forces much larger than himself with nothing but his humor.

Hershel was originally a shochet who, having offended some of his townspeople with his humor, left, wandered, and "found his calling" as court jester of the Baal Shem Tov's grandson. Publicity for the transition to reputation as a jokester is traced to a 1920s writer named Chaim Bloch and a book he wrote.

== Overview ==
While his exploits have been mythologized over the years, the character of Hershele is based on a historic figure, who lived in what is today Ukraine during the late 18th or early 19th century. He may have used his wits to get by, eventually earning a permanent position as court jester of sorts to Boruch of Medzhybizh.

In the Hershele stories, he was chosen by members of Boruch's court in order to counter the rebbe's notorious fits of temper and lift his chronic melancholy.

It is believed that Hershele died of an accident that was brought about by one of Boruch's fits of anger. Hershele lingered for several days and died in Boruch's own bed surrounded by Boruch and his followers. He is thought to be buried in the old Jewish cemetery in Medzhybizh.

== In later culture ==
Hershele was the subject of several epic poems, a novel, a comedy performed in 1930 by the Vilna Troupe, and a US TV program in the 1950s. Two illustrated children's books, The Adventures of Hershel of Ostropol, and Hershel and the Hanukkah Goblins, have been published. Both books were written by Eric Kimmel and illustrated by Trina Schart Hyman.

A tale about him, When Hershel Eats by Nathan Ausubel, was included in Joanna Cole's 1982 work, Best-Loved Folktales of the World.

In 2002, a play entitled Hershele the Storyteller was performed in New York City.

== Examples of tales ==
=== The goose leg ===
When Hershel was a child he once stole a leg off a roast goose his mother had set aside for that night's dinner. When his mother saw the goose and rebuked him for taking the leg, he replied that perhaps the goose had only had one leg, and his mother asked if he had ever seen a one-legged bird.

That evening on the way to the synagogue with his father Hershel pointed out a stork standing on one leg. His father said the stork was standing on one leg with the other leg hidden, threw a stone to drive off the stork, which put its other leg down and flew off. Hershel's father then told him his mother was right.

"Maybe if you drove the roast goose off, you'd see its other leg" said Hershel.

=== "What my father did" ===
Once Hershel stopped at an inn where the only person besides Hershel himself was the innkeeper's wife, who decided he looked too impoverished and disreputable to be able to pay and told him the kitchen was closed. "In that case. I'll have to do what my father did" he told her, and when she asked, frightened, what his father did, he said "My father did what he had to do."

Imagining that his father might have done terrible things when his demands were not met, she brought him a full meal. After he ate it he complimented her on the food. Now that he was satisfied she finally dared to ask him what it was his father did, and he said "whenever my father couldn’t get anything to eat—he went to bed hungry."

=== The caftan ===
After Hershel had been turned away from the wedding of a rich man's daughter because he was shabbily dressed, he returned wearing a new caftan he had borrowed from a friend and was admitted.

When he was given food and drink at the wedding he spilled it all on the caftan instead of eating and drinking it, and when asked to explain he said "After all, it's the caftan that's being honored, not me."

=== Marriage ===
Asked if a story that he used a stick to beat his wife while she hit him in the head with a rolling pin was true, he said "Not really; sometimes we switch."

== See also ==
- Hitar Petar
- Motke Chabad
- Nasreddin
- Păcală
- Till Eulenspiegel
