= Trina Schart Hyman =

American children's book illustrator

Trina Schart Hyman (April 8, 1939 – November 19, 2004) was an American illustrator of children's books. She illustrated over 150 books, including fairy tales and Arthurian legends. She won the 1985 Caldecott Medal for U.S. picture book illustration, recognizing Saint George and the Dragon, retold by Margaret Hodges.

== Biography ==
Born in Philadelphia to Margaret Doris Bruck and Albert H. Schart, she grew up in Wyncote, Pennsylvania and learned to read and draw at an early age. Her favorite story as a child was Little Red Riding Hood, and she spent an entire year of her childhood wearing a red cape. She enrolled at the Philadelphia Museum College of Art (now part of the University of the Arts) in 1956, but moved to Boston, Massachusetts, in 1959 after marrying Harris Hyman, a mathematician and engineer. She graduated from School of the Museum of Fine Arts, Boston, in 1960. The couple then moved to Stockholm, Sweden, for two years, where Trina studied at the Konstfackskolan (Swedish State Art School) and illustrated her first children's book, titled Toffe och den lilla bilen (Toffe and the Little Car).

In 1963, the couple's daughter, Katrin Tchana (née Hyman), was born. In 1968, the couple divorced. Trina and Katrin moved to Lyme, New Hampshire. Schart Hyman lived for some time with children's writer and editor Barbara Rogasky (with whom she collaborated on several projects). During roughly the last decade of her life, Schart Hyman's romantic partner was teacher Jean K. Aull. She was the first art director of Cricket Magazine, from 1973 to 1979, and contributed illustrations regularly until her death. Many of Schart Hyman's illustrations can be quite complex. For example, in one scene in Saint George and the Dragon, the dragon's tail stretches into the border artwork of the next page.

== Awards and honors ==
Hyman won the annual Caldecott Medal from the American Library Association, recognizing the year's best-illustrated U.S. children's picture book, for Saint George and the Dragon, published by Little, Brown in 1984. Margaret Hodges wrote the text, retelling Edmund Spenser's version of the Saint George legend. She also won the Boston Globe–Horn Book Award for picture books, recognizing King Stork (Little, Brown, 1973), text by Howard Pyle (1853–1911).She won the Golden Kite Award for her illustration of Little Red Riding Hood in 1984.

She received three Caldecott Honors, for her own retelling of Little Red Riding Hood in 1984, Hershel and the Hanukkah Goblins by Eric Kimmel in 1990, and A Child's Calendar by John Updike in 2000.

The Golem by Barbara Rogasky and illustrated by Hyman won the 1997 National Jewish Book Award in the Children's Literature category.

== Works ==
=== As writer and illustrator ===
- How Six Found Christmas, 1969.
- (Reteller) The Sleeping Beauty, from the Brothers Grimm, 1977.
- A Little Alphabet, 1980.
- Self-Portrait: Trina Schart Hyman, 1981.
- (Reteller) Little Red Riding Hood, from the Brothers Grimm, 1983.
- The Enchanted Forest, 1984.

=== As illustrator ===
- Hertha von Gebhardt, Toffe och den lilla bilen (Rabén & Sjögren, 1961) – as Trina Schart, Swedish-language edition of Toffi und das kleine Auto (Toffi and the Tiny Auto), OCLC 72336530
- Laurence Rittenhouse, God Created Me (Boston: United Church Press, 1963) – as Trina Schart Hyman, OCLC 1402954
- Carl Memling, Riddles, Riddles, from A to Z, 1963.
- Melanie Bellah, Bow Wow! Meow!, 1963.
- Sandol S. Warburg, Curl Up Small, 1964.
- Edna Butler Trickey, Billy Finds Out, 1964.
- Eileen O'Faolain, Children of the Salmon, 1965.
- All Kinds of Signs, 1965.
- Ruth Sawyer, Joy to the World: Christmas Legends, 1966.
- Joyce Varney, The Magic Maker, 1966.
- Virginia Haviland, reteller, Favorite Fairy Tales Told in Czechoslovakia, 1966.
- Edna Butler Trickey, Billy Celebrates, 1966.
- Jacob D. Townsend, The Five Trials of the Pansy Bed, 1967.
- Elizabeth Johnson, Stuck with Luck, 1967.
- Josephine Poole, Moon Eyes, 1967.
- John T. Moore, Cinnamon Seed, 1967.
- Paul Tripp, The Little Red Flower, 1968.
- Joyce Varney, The Half-Time Gypsy, 1968.
- Elizabeth Johnson, All in Free but Janey, 1968.
- Norah Smaridge, I Do My Best, 1968.
- Betty M. Owen and Mary MacEwen, editors, Wreath of Carols, 1968.
- Tom McGowen, Dragon Stew, 1969.
- Susan Meyers, The Cabin on the Fjord, 1969.
- Peter Hunter Blair, The Coming of Pout, 1969.
- Clyde R. Bulla, The Moon Singer, 1969.
- Ruth Nichols, A Walk Out of the World, 1969.
- Claudia Paley, Benjamin the True, 1969.
- Paul Tripp, The Vi-Daylin Book of Minnie the Mump, 1970.
- Donald J. Sobol, Greta the Strong, 1970.
- Blanche Luria Serwer, reteller, Let's Steal the Moon: Jewish Tales, Ancient and Recent, 1970.
- Mollie Hunter, The Walking Stones: A Story of Suspense, 1970.
- Tom McGowen, Sir Machinery, 1970.
- Phyllis Krasilovsky, The Shy Little Girl, 1970.
- The Pumpkin Giant, retold by Ellin Greene, 1970.
- Wylly Folk St. John, The Ghost Next Door, 1971.
- Osmond Molarsky, The Bigger They Come, 1971.
- Osmond Molarsky, Take It or Leave It, 1971.
- Carolyn Meyer, The Bread Book: All about Bread and How to Make It, 1971.
- Elizabeth Johnson, Break a Magic Circle, 1971.
- Ellin Greene, reteller, Princess Rosetta and the Popcorn Man, 1971.
- Eleanor Cameron, A Room Made of Windows, 1971.
- Eleanor Clymer, How I Went Shopping and What I Got, 1972.
- Dori White, Sarah and Katie, 1972.
- Ruth Nichols, The Marrow of the World, 1972.
- Eva Moore, The Fairy Tale Life of Hans Christian Andersen, 1972.
- Jan Wahl, Magic Heart, 1972.
- Phyllis Krasilovsky, The Popular Girls Club, 1972.
- Paula Hendrich, Who Says So?, 1972.
- Myra Cohn Livingston, editor, Listen, Children, Listen: An Anthology of Poems for the Very Young, 1972.
- Carol Ryrie Brink, The Bad Times of Irma Baumlein, 1972.
- Eve Merriam, reteller, Epaminondas, 1972.
- Howard Pyle, King Stork, 1973.
- Hans Christian Andersen, The Ugly Duckling and Two Other Stories, edited by Lilian Moore, 1973.
- Phyllis La Farge, Joanna Runs Away, 1973.
- Ellin Greene, compiler, Clever Cooks: A Concoction of Stories, Recipes and Riddles, 1973.
- Carol Ryrie Brink, Caddie Woodlawn, revised edition, 1973.
- Elizabeth Coatsworth, The Wanderers, 1973.
- Eleanor G. Vance, The Everything Book, 1974.
- Doris Gates, Two Queens of Heaven: Aphrodite and Demeter, 1974.
- Dorothy S. Carter, editor, Greedy Mariani and Other Folktales of the Antilles, 1974.
- Charles Causley, Figgie Hobbin, 1974.
- Charlotte Herman, You've Come a Long Way, Sybil McIntosh: A Book of Manners and Grooming for Girls, 1974.
- Jacob Grimm and Wilhelm Grimm, Snow White, translated from the German by Paul Heins, 1974.
- Jean Fritz, Why Don't You Get a Horse, Sam Adams?, 1974.
- March Wiesbauer, The Big Green Bean, 1974.
- Tobi Tobias, The Quitting Deal, 1975.
- Margaret Kimmel, Magic in the Mist, 1975.
- Jane Curry, The Watchers, 1975.
- Louise Moeri, Star Mother's Youngest Child, 1975.
- Jean Fritz, Will You Sign Here, John Hancock?, 1976.
- Daisy Wallace, editor, Witch Poems, 1976.
- William Sleator, Among the Dolls, 1976.
- Tobi Tobias, Jane, Wishing, 1977.
- Spiridon Vangheli, Meet Guguze, 1977.
- Norma Farber, Six Impossible Things Before Breakfast, 1977.
- Betsy Hearne, South Star, 1977.
- Patricia Gauch, On to Widecombe Fair, 1978.
- Betsy Hearne, Home, 1979.
- Norma Farber, How Does It Feel to Be Old?, 1979.
- Pamela Stearns, The Mechanical Doll, 1979.
- Barbara S. Hazen, Tight Times, 1979.
- Daisy Wallace, editor, Fairy Poems, 1980.
- J. M. Barrie, Peter Pan, 1980.
- Elizabeth G. Jones, editor, Ranger Rick's Holiday Book, 1980.
- Kathryn Lasky, The Night Journey, 1981.
- Jean Fritz, The Man Who Loved Books, 1981.
- Jacob Grimm and Wilhelm Grimm, Rapunzel, retold by Barbara Rogasky, 1982.
- Margaret Mary Kimmel and Elizabeth Segel, For Reading Out Loud! A Guide to Sharing Books with Children, 1983.
- Mary Calhoun, Big Sixteen, 1983.
- Astrid Lindgren, Ronia the Robber's Daughter, 1983.
- Charles Dickens, A Christmas Carol: In Prose, Being a Ghost Story of Christmas, 1983.
- Myra Cohn Livingston, Christmas Poems, 1984.
- (With Hilary Knight, Nancy Carlson, and Peter E. Hanson) Pamela Espeland and Marilyn Waniek, The Cat Walked through the Casserole: And Other Poems for Children, 1984.
- Margaret Hodges, Saint George and the Dragon, A Golden Legend Adapted from Edmund Spenser's Faerie Queen, 1984.
- Elizabeth Winthrop, The Castle in the Attic, 1985.
- Dylan Thomas, A Child's Christmas in Wales, 1985.
- Jacob Grimm and Wilhelm Grimm, The Water of Life, retold by Barbara Rogasky, 1986.
- Vivian Vande Velde, A Hidden Magic, 1986.
- Myra Cohn Livingston, compiler, Cat Poems, 1987.
- Mark Twain, A Connecticut Yankee in King Arthur's Court, 1988.
- Geoffrey Chaucer, Canterbury Tales, adapted by Barbara Cohen, 1988.
- (With Marcia Brown and others) Beatrice Schenk de Regniers, compiler, Sing a Song of Popcorn: Every Child's Book of Poems, 1988.
- Swan Lake, retold by Margot Fonteyn, 1989.
- Eric Kimmel, Hershel and the Hanukkah Goblins, 1989.
- Margaret Hodges, The Kitchen Knight: A Tale from King Arthur, 1990.
- (With Steven Kellogg and others) Ann Durell, Marilyn Sachs, compilers, Lois Lowry, writer, The Big Book for Peace, 1990.
- Barbara Rogasky, compiler and editor, Winter Poems, 1991.
- Jane Yolen, Wizard's Hall, 1991.
- Lloyd Alexander, The Fortune-Tellers, 1992.
- Marion Dane Bauer, Ghost Eye, 1992.
- Michael J. Rosen, Speak!: Children's Book Illustrators Brag about their Dogs, 1993.
- Eric A. Kimmel, reteller, Iron John, 1994.
- Eric A. Kimmel, reteller, The Adventures of Hershel of Ostropol, 1995.
- Barbara Rogasky, The Golem: A Version, 1996.
- Margaret Hodges, adapter, Comus, 1996.
- Angela Shelf Medearis, Haunts: Five Hair-Raising Tales, 1996.
- Howard Pyle, Bearskin, 1997.
- John Updike, A Child's Calendar, 1999.
- Katrin Tchana, reteller, The Serpent Slayer and Other Stories of Strong Women, 2000.
- Sherry Garland, Children of the Dragon: Selected Tales from Vietnam, 2001.
- Katrin Tchana, Sense Pass King: A Tale from Cameroon, 2002.
- Dean Whitlock, Sky Carver, 2005.
- Contributor of illustrations to textbooks and Cricket magazine.
- Katrin Tchana, Changing Woman and Her Sisters: Goddesses from Around the World, 2006.

=== Adaptations ===
- Dragon Stew was adapted as a filmstrip with record, BFA Educational Media, 1975.
- Tight Times was filmed as a Reading Rainbow special, PBS-TV, 1983.
- Little Red Riding Hood was adapted as a filmstrip with cassette, Listening Library, 1984.

== Gallery ==
Saint George and the Dragon (1984) book cover

Hershel and the Hanukkah Goblins (1989) book cover
