= Dreams in the Golden Country =

Children's historical fiction novel by Kathryn Lasky

Dreams in the Golden Country: The Diary of Zipporah Feldman, a Jewish Immigrant Girl, New York City, 1903
- Author: Kathryn Lasky
- Language: English
- Genre: Historical Fiction
- Set in: New York City, 1903
- Publisher: Scholastic
- Publication date: March 1, 1998
- Publication place: United States
- ISBN: 9780439156004

Dreams in the Golden Country: The Diary of Zipporah Feldman, a Jewish Immigrant Girl, New York City, 1903 is a 1998 children's historical novel by Kathryn Lasky, part of the Dear America series. The novel takes the form of a diary written by 12-year-old Zipporah "Zippy" Feldman, a Russian Jew who has immigrated to the Lower East Side of New York City with her family. It is the series' only book on Jewish and Russian immigrants to the U.S.

The novel was partially inspired by Lasky's grandparents' immigration to the U.S.

== Analysis ==
The "golden country" in the novel's title refers to the United States and its economic opportunity. This eponym has been used similarly in other children's literature discussing Jewish immigration to the U.S. in this period. However, the novel also discusses the "twin threats of poverty and sickness" in Zippy's new life, and how "exploitation clashes with the expectation of prosperity" in the Lower East Side.

The novel takes place entirely within the U.S., as with the majority of similar children's literature addressing Jewish immigration to the U.S. at the turn of the 20th century.

== Synopsis ==
Zipporah "Zippy" Feldman, her mother, and her older sisters Miriam and Tovah arrive at Ellis Island, after traveling from Zarichka, a village in the Russian Empire. After passing the health inspections, they reunite with Zippy's father, who arrived in the U.S. previously to work, and settle into their tenement on the Lower East Side.

Zippy begins attending school, where she begins learning English and American culture, and makes friends. She also becomes interested in theater. Tovah begins work at a shirtwaist factory and founds a union there, while Miriam elopes with a Catholic man named Sean, which angers her mother.

In addition to finding her own place in American life, Zippy tries to reignite her father's love of violin and find ways to help her mother adjust to American culture.

After a series of tragic events, including the death of family friend Mamie in a shirtwaist factory fire and the death of Zippy's new baby brother, Yossel, the family reunites with Miriam and Zippy finishes her diary.

== Film adaptation ==
VHS cover for the HBO film adaptation.

The novel was adapted into an HBO film of the same name in April 1999, following largely the same plot at the book. Zippy was played by Natalie Vansier.
