= Motke Chabad =

Jewish Lithuanian joker

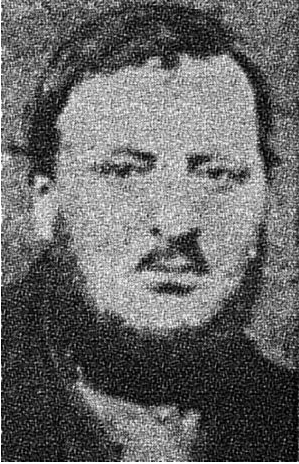
Motke Chabad

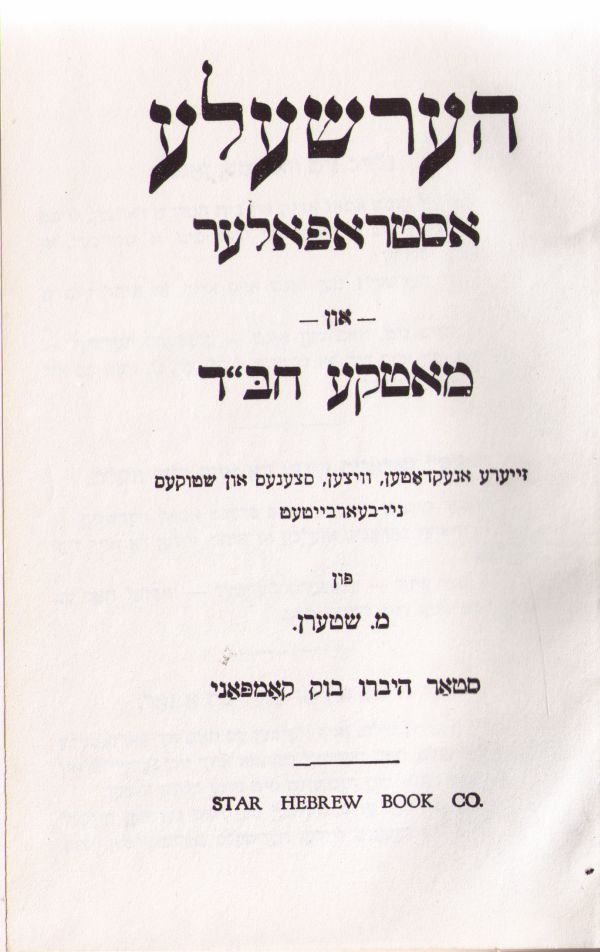
A book Hershele Ostropoler and Motke Chabad

Motke Chabad (Mordechai Chabad) (c.1820-c.1880) was a Jewish Lithuanian (litvak) jester (badchen) from Vilnius known from many Jewish jokes.

- Mordechai complained: "Had God willed it, I could have made a hundred golden rubles yesterday". People asked: "How could that be?" He replied: "A rich matron said she would give me one hundred golden rubles to look upon me." They told him: "Mordechai, you fool, why did you refuse?" He answered: "I did not refuse. It was just that she was blind in both eyes".

In many jokes he is an archetypal schlemiel, misfortunate in his endeavors:

- Motke decided to become a teamster, but soon he noticed that his horses eat lots of oats and decided to train them out of this bad habit depriving him of all profits. So he started giving them less and less oats and soon they ate almost none of it. The horses didn't complain, but suddenly they all died. "What a pity!" - grieved he. - "Would they endure one more week and they wouldn't need oats at all!".

Some jokes of Motke Chabad are ascribed to Hershele Ostropoler and vice versa.

== Some collections of jokes about Motke Chabad ==
=== Popular publications in Yiddish ===
- Levitan, M. Ya. (ed.) Motke Khabad, oder Vitsen iber vitsen, nayntsig sheyne vitsen in reyn zhargon heroysgegebn fun M. I. Levitan. Vilna: Typography of Rozenkrants and Shriftszetser, 1892. - 32 p. (90 jokes with foreword).
  - Levitan, M. Ya. (ed.) Motke Khabad fun Vilne, oder Vitsen iber vitsen, nayntsig sheyne vitsen in reyn zhargon heroysgegebn fun M. I. Levitan. 3-rd ed. from the 2nd edition of 1893 without changes. Vilna, 1894. - 32 p. (90 jokes with foreword)
- [Anon.] (ed.) Motke Chabad oder Vitse iber vitse. 180 sheyne vitsn in reyne zhargon. New York: Di Hebrew Publishing Companie, 1902. - 59 + 5 p. (180 jokes), 10th ed.;
  - [Anon.] (ed.)Motke Chabad oder Vitse iber vitse. 180 sheyne vitsn in reyne zhargon. New York: Di Hebrew Publishing Company, 1911. - 59 p. (180 jokes), 11th ed.
  - [Anon.] (ed.) Motke Chabad oder Vitse iber vitse. 180 sheyne vitsn in reyne zhargon. New York: Di Hebrew Publishing Company, [1926 ?] - 59 p. (180 jokes); on the title is noted as 11th ed.
  - [Anon.] (ed.) Der velt barimter komiker Motke Khabad. New York: Hebrew Publishing Company, New Yorḳ, [between 1900 and 1940]. - 59 p. (180 jokes)
- Shtern, M. (ed.) Motke Khabad, zayne aneḳdoten, ṿitsen, stsenes un shtukes nay-bearbaytet fun M. Shtern. New York: Star Hebrew Books Co, [no date]. - 63 p. (jokes are not numbered)
  - Shtern, M. (ed.) Motke Khabad, zayne aneḳdoten, ṿitsen, stsenes un shtukes nay-bearbaytet fun M. Shtern. New York: Star Hebrew Books Co, [no date]. - 63 p. (jokes are not numbered)
- Shtern, M. (ed.) Hershele Osṭropoler un Motke Khabad, zeyere anekdoten, ṿitsen, stsenes un shtukes nay-bearbaytet fun M. Shtern. New York: Star Hebrew Books Co. [no date]. 124 p. (jokes are not numbered)

=== Folklore collections in Yiddish ===
- Cahan, I. L. (ed.) Vitsn un vitsike mayselekh: Motke Khabad. in: Yidisher folklor. Vilna: YIVO, 1938. P. 197-199 (15 jokes).

he:מוטקה חב"ד
