= Y. Y. Trunk =

Polish-American Jewish literary critic and author

Yehiel Yeshaya Trunk (Hebrew: יחיאל ישעיהו טרונק), better known by his pen name Y. Y. Trunk, was a Jewish literary critic and author. He is best known for his criticism of Sholem Aleichem, his imaginative reworkings of Jewish folklore, and his collections of humorous stories about Chełm.

== Life ==
Trunk was born in Osmólsk Górny, Poland to a wealthy Jewish family, and was raised in Łódź. His mother's family were successful landowners, while his paternal side included the tzadik Shayele Kutner and his grandfather, the rabbi of Kutno. He received both a secular and religious education, initially writing in Hebrew from 1905 but shifting to Yiddish from the influence of I. L. Peretz by 1908. Under the editorial pen of Peretz, he began publishing fiction, prose, poetry, and essays in 1908. Trunk married Khane Prywes, the granddaughter of wealthy industrialist Isaiah Prywes, and was able to write in financial security. They traveled extensively throughout Europe, North Africa, and Asia, spending twelve months in Palestine from 1913 to 1914. His time in Palestine became the basis of his book Feygnboymer (Fig Trees), published in 1922.

In 1925, Trunk moved to Warsaw and became head of the Yiddish PEN club in 1936.

Following the invasion of Poland in 1939, Trunk and his wife fled eastward, into Siberia, Japan, and eventually the United States. Arriving in New York City, his wife worked in a sweatshop, supporting his writing once again. After Khane's death in 1944, Trunk lived in the Washington Heights neighborhood of Manhattan for the remainder of his life. Between 1951 and 1960, he published another eight books on a variety of subjects.

Trunk's corpus of works ranged widely, from novellas and short story collections to essays and non-fiction books about socialism, Jewish culture, and writers, foreign and domestic, including Hersh Dovid Nomberg and Oscar Wilde. Following his arrival in the United States, he wrote a seven-volume autobiography, Poyln (Poland), that included collections of literature, criticism, and Chełm-related folklore.

== Bibliography ==
- Feygenboymer : un and[ere] dertseylungen (in Yiddish). 1922. OCLC 48422930.
- Trunk, Yehiel Yeshaya (2007). Shapiro, Robert Moses; Wróbel, Piotr (eds.). Poyln. Translated by Clarke, Anna. University of Toronto. ISBN 9780802093301.
