= Samson ben Pesah Ostropoli =

Polish rabbi & martyr (1600–1648)

Samson ben Pesah Ostropoli (1600 – July 15, 1648), was a Polish rabbi and Kabbalist from Ostropol who was killed at Polonnoye, Volhynia, during the Khmelnytsky Uprising. His maternal grandfather was Shimshon, brother of Judah Loew ben Bezalel. When the Cossacks laid siege to Polonnoye, Samson, with 300 of his followers, arrayed in their shrouds and praying-shawls, went to the synagogue, and stood there praying until the enemy came and butchered them all.

Ostropoli was a noted kabalist. He was the author of a commentary (published by his nephew Pesaḥ at Zolkiev in 1709) on the kabalistic work Ḳarnayim. According to the author of Yewen Meẓulah, he wrote also a commentary on the Zohar, titled Machane Dan, in conformity with the cabalistic system of Isaac Luria, but this work has not been preserved. Other works of his include Dan Yadin, a commentary on an early cryptic kabalistic work called Sefer Karnayim, and a collection of all Rabbi Shimshon's known Torah commentaries called Nitzotzay Shimshon.

His most famous work is the Erev (eve of) Pesach Letter famous for the assurance of blessing to those that study it called "Maamar Sod Eztba Elokim" (The Secret of The Finger of God) on the ten plagues in Egypt.

== See also ==
- Martyrdom in Judaism
