= Hershel and the Hanukkah Goblins =

1989 picture book by Eric Kimmel and Trina Schart Hyman

- Author: Eric Kimmel, Trina Schart Hyman
- Language: English
- Published: 1989
- Publisher: Holiday House
- Publication place: United States of America
- ISBN: 9780823431649
- OCLC: 867424068

Hershel and the Hanukkah Goblins is an American children's picture book written by Eric Kimmel and illustrated by Trina Schart Hyman in 1989. It features the Jewish folk hero and trickster figure Hershel of Ostropol challenging and defeating through guile a series of goblins over the course of the eight nights of Hanukkah, culminating in a showdown with the King of the Goblins himself on the final night. The book won a Caldecott Honor in 1990.

== Adaptations ==
In 1999, Shari Aronson of Z Puppets Rosenschnoz received permission from Eric Kimmel to adapt the book Hershel and the Hanukkah Goblins for the stage. This adaptation has since been produced four times by Minnesota Jewish Theatre Company, with puppets by Chris Griffith winning a 2009 MN Ivey Award, and multiple times by theater companies across the U.S.
