= Stanley Simmonds =

English painter

Stanley Simmonds ARCA
- Simmonds alongside one of his portraits of Charles Causley
- Born: 29 October 1917; Droitwich, Worcestershire, England
- Died: 22 June 2006 (aged 88); Launceston, Cornwall, England
- Education: Royal Grammar School Worcester; Birmingham College of Art; Royal College of Art
- Known for: Painter, Art teacher
- Spouse: Cynthia Kathleen King
- Website: stanleysimmonds.com

Stanley Wilfred Simmonds ARCA (29 October 1917 – 11 June 2006) was a British painter and art teacher.

He was born in Droitwich, Worcestershire, England, in 1917, the third and youngest son of a relief signalman and a dressmaker. After a scholarship to the Royal Grammar School Worcester, he attended Birmingham College of Art from 1934 to 1939. During the Second World War, he served in the Royal Navy, where he encountered the poet Charles Causley, who was to remain a lifelong friend. He painted a number of portraits of Causley, and the poet dedicated his 1970 book of poems for children, Figgie Hobbin to Simmonds and his wife. Serving aboard the aircraft carrier HMS Arbiter, he observed the dropping of the atomic bomb on Hiroshima. Service in the Far East awoke an interest in oriental art, which is reflected in the colour-palette of some his later paintings.

After the war, he studied at the Royal College of Art, graduating in 1948 with the ARCA in Painting. It was around this time that he married the artist Cynthia King, whom he had met at the college.

In 1949 he began teaching art at Chislehurst and Sidcup Grammar School, where he was to remain for the entirety of his teaching career. Among his pupils was Quentin Blake, who has paid tribute to him as a mentor:

He was enormously helpful and valuable to me, as I am sure he was to many others, because his commentary on your work was not a question of marks and assessment but an adult exchange about what you had actually done.

This is supported by the school's historian, who notes that Simmonds fought against the headmaster's "relentless drive for academic laurels".

== Style ==
Droitwich Orchard by Stanley Simmonds. Oil on wood. 43cm x 43cm

His early work was purely figurative, with portraits, urban and country scenes, exemplified by Droitwich Orchard. These early works were praised by a reviewer as

lavish landscape oil paintings, which could be equated to the eloquence of Wordsworth in a frame. Typical of his early work, the luscious strokes of deep greens and bursts of colour capture England’s delicate wilderness beautifully.

In the post-war period, his paintings developed a more abstract approach, though still reflecting the physical world, as seen in a series of paintings of Billingsgate Market and its porters:

His paintings of the market document his journey from figuration through to abstraction, exploring blocks of colour and tonal valuation but all imbued with the light and atmosphere of the market at dawn.

Billingsgate Porters by Stanley Simmonds. Oil on board, 53cm x 69cm.

In later years he started to embrace a more complete abstraction, seen, for example, in the Untitled painting shown here, originally exhibited in 1960. Of Simmonds's development, Quentin Blake commented:

The Billingsgate paintings were evidently the fruit of many studies made on site; but it wasn’t, you felt, the detail of everyday life that took the artist’s attention as much as, together with substantial reality, the architecture of forms supplied by the porters and their surroundings. Those pictures were soon followed by a remarkable development into abstraction. What was formerly substance becomes atmosphere. It is a world of movement, distance, luminosity, but one which the architecture of the canvas is still disposed with authority.

Untitled, 1960, by Stanley Simmonds.

His retirement to Cornwall saw a return to more representational work, such as the paintings of the Barbican harbour in Plymouth, though these still had a strong abstract flavour.

== Exhibitions ==
He exhibited at the Royal Academy and with the London Group. In 1958, he was part of the Contemporary British Landscape Painters exhibition at the Bear Lane Gallery, Oxford, along with John Piper, John Bratby and Ivon Hitchens, and he had a number of further exhibitions at that gallery. In 1963 Hertford College, Oxford, hosted a joint exhibition of work by Simmonds and Quentin Blake.

In 1978, Simmonds was awarded The George Rowney Prize for Oil Painting in "The Spirit of London Competition2. Alongside his work as a painter, he undertook book illustration and theatre design.

== Later life ==
In 1983, he retired from teaching, and he and Cynthia moved to South Petherwin, near Launceston in Cornwall, home of his friend Charles Causley. There, he set up a studio in a former Bible Christian chapel, where he continued to paint until his death in 2006. Cynthia Simmonds died in 2012. Retrospective exhibitions of his work were held in Launceston in 2012, organised by the Charles Causley Society, Lewes in 2014 and Egdean, Sussex, in 2015. The Lewes retrospective was described by Quentin Blake as "an eloquent tribute to an exemplary life in art".

== Publications ==
- Causley, Charles (1973). Six Women. Keepsake Poem 14. illustrated by Stanley Simmonds. Richmond, Surrey: Keepsake Press.
- Causley, Charles (1976). Here we go round the Round House. illustrated by Stanley Simmonds. Leicester: New Broom Press. ISBN 0901870234.
- Savage, Toni (1976). Dancing Grace. Phoenix Broadsheet 115. illustrated by Stanley Simmonds. Leicester: Toni Savage.

== Sources ==
- Artemis Arts (15 June 2016). "Stanley Simmonds ARCA 1917–2006. A Retrospective Exhibition". Artemis Arts.
- Blake, Quentin (2013). "An introduction to Stanley Simmonds by Quentin Blake". stanleysimmonds.com.
- General Register Office (2006). "England & Wales Deaths 1837–2007". Findmypast.(subscription required)
- Gillbard, John (2013). South Petherwin Parish Past & Present No 1. Redruth: Gillbard Press. ISBN 978-0957609648.
- Green, Laurence (2013). All Cornwall Thunders at My Door: A Biography of Charles Causley. Sheffield: Cornovia Press. ISBN 978-1-908878-08-3.
- Moncrieff, Elspeth (2013). "A short biography of Stanley Simmonds". stanleysimmonds.com.
- Moncrieff-Bray Gallery (6 October 2015). "Stanley Simmonds (1917–2006) Paintings from his Cornish Studio". Moncrieff-Bray Gallery.
- Probate Service (2016). "Find a will". GOV.UK.
- Read, Rebecca (15 May 2014). "Brighton Fringe: Stanley Simmonds: A Retrospective 1917–2006, Lewes House, Lewes, until May 25". The Argus.
- stanleysimmonds.com (2013). "Stanley Simmonds. A list of previous exhibitions". stanleysimmonds.com.
- Telegraph Announcements (2006). "Deaths>Simmonds". Telegraph Announcements.
- Telegraph Announcements (2012). "Deaths>Simmonds". Telegraph Announcements.
- Wells, Charles; Hazelgrove, John (2011). Past Purple: A History of Chislehurst and Sidcup Grammar School (2 ed.). London: Chislehurst and Sidcup Grammar School. ISBN 978-0-9569063-0-4.
