= Blood Secret =

Young adult novel by Kathryn Lasky

- Author: Kathryn Lasky
- Cover artist: Sasha Illingworth
- Language: English
- Genre: Novel
- Publisher: HarperCollins
- Publication date: 1 August 2004
- Publication place: United States
- Media type: Print (Hardcover and Paperback)
- Pages: 256 pp (first edition, hardback)
- ISBN: 978-0-06-000066-0 (first edition, hardback)
- OCLC: 54035383
- LC Class: PZ7.L3274 Bl 2004

Blood Secret is a young adult novel by Kathryn Lasky.

== Plot summary ==
Fourteen-year-old Jerry Luna refuses to speak after her mother's disappearance. Living at her great-great-aunt Constanza's house, she discovers a trunk and is transported into the lives of her Jewish ancestors living in Spain in the years before the Spanish Inquisition and later in Spanish America.

== Reception ==
Kirkus Reviews discussed how "Lasky tries to weave [Blood Secret] into a tale of Catholic, Jewish, Aztec, and Navajo strands, where Jerry learns her full name and all of its meaning." They concluded, "Though it often reads like a lesson in this aspect of Jewish history, rather than a true historical time-travel, there will be readers eager to delve into the secrets of blood and shadows."

Booklist also reviewed the novel.

== See also ==
- Time travel
- Mutism
- Jews of Spain
