= Saint George and the Dragon (book) =

1984 picture book by Margaret Hodges

- Saint George and the Dragon
- Author: Margaret Hodges
- Illustrator: Trina Schart Hyman
- Cover artist: Trina Schart Hyman
- Genre: Children's book
- Publisher: Little, Brown
- Publication date: August 23, 1984
- Publication place: United States
- Pages: 32
- ISBN: 978-0-316-36789-9
- OCLC: 10046624
- Dewey Decimal: 398.2 19
- LC Class: PZ8.1.H69 Sai 1984

Saint George and the Dragon is a children's book written by Margaret Hodges and illustrated by Trina Schart Hyman. Released by Little, Brown in 1984, it was the recipient of the Caldecott Medal for illustration in 1985. The text is adapted from Edmund Spenser's epic poem The Faerie Queene.

== Description ==
Saint George and The Dragon is a small book measuring 9 x 0.1 x 10.1 inches, weighing 5.6 ounces, and is 32 pages long.

== Plot ==
This story begins with a nameless knight riding around the plain who has never been to battle. Despite this the Queene of Faeries sends him to fight a dragon who has been terrorizing their land. He travels with Una the princess of the land. On his way to the dragon the knight meets an old hermit on top of a hill who explains to him his English heritage and tells him his name is George. George meets the dragon lying down as if it was a hill itself. The dragon sees his sword and prepares for battle. The Dragon fells our hero twice, but each time he rises up stronger. After a hard-fought third battle George eventually emerges triumphant and slays the dragon. The king, promising Una to whoever slays the dragon, fulfills his promise and marries George and Una. Although all is well in the land George still fights other battles for the Queene of Faeries and through these battles George becomes Saint George.

== Characters ==
- George - Red cross knight hired by the queen of Faeries to defeat the dragon.
- Queen of Faeries - Sends George to fight the dragon.
- Una - The Princess of the land who embarks on the mission with George.
- Hermit - Meets George on top of a hill and informs him that his name is George.
- Dragon - Monster who makes life hard for the people of the land until it gets slain by George.
- Queen - Una's mother.
- King - Promises his daughter Una to whoever slays the dragon.
- Donkey - Una rides alongside George on top of the donkey
- Dwarf - Tasked with carrying the food.

== History ==
The legend which was developed during the crusades is about George, a man who lived in 3rd century Rome in the area we call Libya today. George was an army commander during the persecution of Christianity under Roman emperor Diocletian. George refused to persecute Christians and was tortured and eventually beheaded. He became known as Saint George when Christian Roman Emperor Constantine devoted a church to him.

== Critical reception ==
Goodreads.com calls Saint George and the Dragon "the perfect way to introduce a classic tale to a whole new generation of readers." Steve Barancik of "The Best Children's Books" says "St. George appears scratched. The dragon loses some bloody appendages. Thus, make your own decisions about sharing the book with younger children." The Catholic Information Center calls Saint George and the Dragon "truly marvelous and appropriate for girls and boys of all ages." "The Illustrations are worth the admission alone." This adaptation of The Faerie Queen features illustrations that "glitter with color and mesmerizing details," said PW. Kirkus Reviews calls Saint George and the Dragon "a strong narrative, with stagy decor and pictures." In a retrospective essay about the Caldecott Medal-winning books from 1976 to 1985, Barbara Bader described Saint George and the Dragon as "a pretentious invocation of past illustrational glories, which it cheapens rather than enhances: the definition of kitsch."

Awards
Preceded by The Glorious Flight	Caldecott Medal recipient 1985	Succeeded by The Polar Express
