= Sugaring Time =

1983 children's nonfiction book about maple syrup

- Author: Kathryn Lasky
- Language: English
- Genre: Children's literature
- Publisher: Macmillan
- Publication date: 1983
- Publication place: United States
- ISBN: 0-02-751680-6

Sugaring Time is a 1983 children's nonfiction book written by Kathryn Lasky with photographs from her husband Christopher G. Knight. The story follows a Vermont family, the Laceys, as they diligently work to collect and process sap into syrup, beginning with tapping the trees to allow the sap to flow out; the sap is collected and brought to the sugar house for boiling, which evaporates the water in the sap, leaving behind maple syrup. The title refers to the time of the year when the sap begins to flow upward from the roots of the trees and can be harvested. The book earned a Newbery Honor in 1983.
