= Ruth Nichols (author) =

Canadian writer

- Born: Joanna Ruth Nichols; 4 March 1948 (age 78); Toronto, Ontario, Canada
- Occupation: Writer
- Writing career
- Genres: Children's and young adult fantasy and historical fiction

Joanna Ruth Nichols (born March 4, 1948) was a Canadian writer of fiction for children and young adults, primarily historical fiction and historical fantasy.

== Life ==
Ruth Nichols was born in Toronto. She died on August 10, 2023, age 75. At age 18 she wrote her first novel to be published, A Walk Out of the World. That young-adult fantasy was published by Longmans in Canada and Harcourt Brace in America with illustrations by Trina Schart Hyman, when Nichols was 20 or 21.

She received her B.A. in religious studies from the University of British Columbia, and her M.A. in 1972 and Ph.D. in 1977, both from McMaster University. She lectured for several years at Carleton University in Ottawa.

Nichols married William Norman Houston in September 1974. They initially lived in Ottawa and then moved to Toronto. Having experienced success early in life as a writer of adolescent fantasy, Nichols' moved to adult historical fiction. Her last published novel was "What Dangers Deep", set in the Elizabethan era.

After divorcing in 1998, health problems forced Nichols to live in a chronic care facility in Toronto.

== Awards ==
Nichols received the Government of India Prize in 1962 for a 100-page biography of Catherine de' Medici.

The Marrow of the World was named Book of the Year for Children by the Canadian Library Association in 1973.

== Works ==
- A Walk Out of the World (1969), illustrated by Trina Schart Hyman
- Ceremony of Innocence (1969)
- The Marrow of the World (1972), illus. Hyman – CLA Book of the Year
- Song of the Pearl (1976)
- The Left-Handed Spirit (1978)
- The Burning of the Rose (1990)
- What Dangers Deep: a story of Philip Sydney (1992)
