= List of Horn Book Magazine editors =

This is a chronological list of editors of Horn Book Magazine.

== Bertha Mahony Miller ==
Bertha Mahony Miller was the founding editor of Horn Book. She served in that post from 1924 to 1951.

== Jennie Lindquist ==
Jennie D. Lindquist served as editor from 1951 to 1958. Before that, she held the title of managing editor under Bertha Mahony Miller.

== Ruth Hill Viguers ==
Ruth Hill Viguers was the editor from 1958 to 1967. She was known to write stories concerning social realism.

== Paul Heins ==
Paul Heins served as editor from 1967 to 1974 and was also a noted book critic. Before his tenure as editor, Heins was a teacher at the Boston English High School. During his editorship, he created the controversial Eleanor Cameron vs. Roald Dahl segment. He was also the author of two books: one being a retelling of Snow White illustrated by Trina Schart Hyman and the other Crosscurrents of Criticism: Horn Book Essays, 1968-1977.

== Ethel Heins ==
Ethel L. Heins served as editor from 1974 to 1985. She added the sections "A Second Look" and "Out of Print — But Look in Your Library". Heins also wrote the book The Cat and the Cook and Other Fables of Krylov. She became editor as of the Magazine's 50th Anniversary edition.

== Anita Silvey ==
Anita Silvey was editor of the magazine from 1985 to 1995, when she left to become the vice-president of Houghton Mifflin.

== Roger Sutton ==
Roger Sutton was editor at The Bulletin of the Center for Children's Books before becoming editor of The Horn Book from 1996 to 2021.

== Elissa Gershowitz ==
Elissa Gershowitz became editor in 2023.
