= April Halprin Wayland =

American children's and young adult author and poet

- Born: 1954 (age 71–72); Southern California, U.S.
- Education: University of California, Davis
- Occupations: Author; poet; educator
- Spouse: Gary Wayland
- Writing career
- Genres: Children's literature Young adult fiction
- Website: www.aprilwayland.com

April Halprin Wayland (born 1954) is an American children's and young adult author, poet, and teacher.

== Biography ==
April Halprin Wayland was born and raised in Southern California and graduated from University of California, Davis with a degree in Human Development. She worked for the Rand Corporation and was the governess for a Hollywood celebrity before starting a company called Positive Education, Inc. with Elizabeth Howland.

After traveling to Europe and working on kibbutz in Israel, she returned to Los Angeles, married Gary Wayland, worked in the corporate world, and four years later left her job to write full-time. She studied with children's authors Ruth Lercher Bornstein, Sonia Levitin, Susan Goldman Rubin, and many others. For twelve years she studied with children's poet Myra Cohn Livingston.

Wayland began teaching in the UCLA Extension Writers' Program in 1999 and, as of 2025, continues teaching two subjects: "Writing the Children's Picture Book" and "Writing Children's Poetry."

Wayland's poems have been included in numerous anthologies and magazines and have won multiple awards from the Society of Children's Book Writers and Illustrators. Her novel in poems, GIRL COMING IN FOR A LANDING, was awarded Pennsylvania State University's Lee Bennett Hopkins Honor Award for Poetry and the Myra Cohn Livingston Award for Best Poetry Book. Her picture book, NEW YEAR AT THE PIER—A Rosh Hashanah Story, won the Sydney Taylor Book Award for Younger Readers.

== Works ==
- More Than Enough: A Passover Story, Dial Books for Young Readers, 2016
- New Year at the Pier: A Rosh Hashanah Story, Dial Books for Young Readers, 2009 (Sydney Taylor Book Award gold medal in the Younger Readers Category)
- Rabbittown, Scholastic, 1989
- The Night Horse, Scholastic, 1991
- It's Not My Turn To Look For Grandma!, Knopf, 1995
- Girl Coming In For A Landing—A Novel in Poems, Knopf, 2002
