= Margaret Hodges =

American writer

- Born: July 26, 1911; Indianapolis, Indiana
- Died: December 13, 2005 (aged 94); Oakmont, Pennsylvania
- Occupations: Librarian, Children's book writer
- Spouse: Fletcher Hodges Jr.

Sarah Margaret Hodges née Moore (July 26, 1911 – December 13, 2005) was an American writer of children's books, librarian, and storyteller.

== Life and career ==
Sarah Margaret Moore was born in Indianapolis, Indiana to Arthur Carlisle Moore and Annie Marie Moore. She enrolled at Tudor Hall, a college preparatory school for girls. A 1932 graduate of Vassar College, she arrived in Pittsburgh, Pennsylvania with her husband Fletcher Hodges Jr. when in 1937 he became curator at the Stephen Foster Memorial. She trained as a librarian at Carnegie Institute of Technology, now Carnegie Mellon University, under Elizabeth Nesbitt, and she volunteered as a storyteller at the Carnegie Library of Pittsburgh. Beginning in 1958 with One Little Drum, she wrote more than 40 published books. She also wrote the book John F. Kennedy: Voice of Hope. In 1953, she was hired as the storyteller for a radio show called Let's Tell A Story. It became the storytelling segment, "Tell Me a Story", for Fred Rogers' children's television show at WQED, which ran from the mid-1960s to 1976 (the first run of Mister Rogers' Neighborhood).

Illustrator Trina Schart Hyman won the annual Caldecott Medal for the 1985 picture book Saint George and the Dragon written by Hodges. Two more of her well-known works are What's for Lunch, Charley?, and Merlin and the Making of the King.

She was a professor of library science at the University of Pittsburgh, where she retired in 1976.

Hodges died of heart disease on December 13, 2005, at her home in Oakmont, Pennsylvania. She suffered from Parkinson's disease.

She wrote her stories on a notebook or a typewriter. "I need good ideas, and they don't come out of machines", she once said.

== Awards ==
- Caldecott Medal, 1985, Saint George and the Dragon

== Bibliography ==
- Saint George and the Dragon (1984) (Illustrated by Trina Schart Hyman)
- The Kitchen Knight: A Tale from King Arthur (1990) (Illustrated by Trina Schart Hyman)
- Comus (1996) (Illustrated by Trina Schart Hyman)
