= Phyllis Krasilovsky =

American writer (1926–2014)

- Born: August 28, 1926
- Died: February 26, 2014 (aged 87)
- Occupation: Writer
- Known for: Children's books

Phyllis Louise Krasilovsky (née Manning; August 28, 1926 – February 26, 2014) was an American writer of children's books.

== Life ==
Phyllis Louise Manning was born in Brooklyn and graduated from its James Madison High School. She recalled that she started telling children's stories to her then-fiancé William Krasilovsky's five-year-old cousin, who was dying of cancer. Krasilovsky was first published after she walked into the Doubleday offices and insisted she must see an editor immediately before the couple left for Alaska.

Children’s book editor Margaret Lesser heard the confrontation at the front desk, invited her in, read the manuscript and accepted The Man Who Didn't Wash His Dishes a few minutes later. Krasilovsky's husband, at the time still a student at Cornell Law School, carefully studied the contract before approving.

Then they headed for Alaska. Their Crossley miniature car was so small, the wheel span was too narrow for the wooden tracks they occasionally encountered on the unpaved Alaska Highway. They had to hitch over the bridges with the car on the back of trucks. Phyllis subsequently used her power of persuasion in the Yukon to get them overnight lodging in a jail when they had nowhere else to stay. They were featured in an article in Ladies' Home Journal, How America Lives: Newcomers to Alaska.

Over the years Krasilovsky published 20 books for children, including The Very Little Girl and Scaredy Cat and perhaps best remembered, The Cow Who Fell in the Canal and Benny’s Flag. She described her The Popular Girls Club as "one of the first books about mean kids". Her books were translated into fourteen languages.

In the late 1960s, Krasilovsky was part of an initiative of eminent children’s book authors who pressed for foreign rights to their works to be negotiated separately from domestic publishing contracts. The first meeting, including Maurice Sendak, Margret Rey and H. A. Rey, Ruth Krauss, Remy Charlip, and Crockett Johnson, was held in her living room in Chappaqua, New York.

Beginning in 1970, Krasilovsky taught children’s literature at Marymount College in Tarrytown, NY, for three years; she was asked to lead the academic procession at graduation despite her lack of a college degree. As a child of the Depression, she had attended James Madison High School in Brooklyn on the commercial track to learn typing and stenography but also joined the debating team, whose medal she won in her graduating year and where she met her future husband.

The success of her book The Cow Who Fell in the Canal led the Dutch government to honor her with a reception at its Consulate in New York and a trip to the Netherlands. In addition to writing for many magazines, she wrote several op-eds for The New York Times.

The Krasilovskys had four children: Alexis, Jessica, Margaret and Peter.

== Death ==
Krasilovsky died at the age of 87 on February 27, 2014, in Redding, Connecticut, of complications from a stroke.

== Books ==
- The Man Who Didn’t Wash His Dishes (Doubleday, 1950), illustrated by Barbara Cooney
- The Very Little Girl (1953), illus. Ninon MacKnight; 1992 edition illus. Karen Gundersheimer, LCCN 91-44949
- The Cow Who Fell in the Canal (1957), illus. Peter Spier
- Scaredy Cat (1959), illus. Ninon
- Benny's Flag (1960), illus. W. T. Mars; 2002 edition illus. Jim Fowler – "recounts the story of Jon Ben Benson, a young Aleut boy who enters a contest to design a state flag for Alaska" (Note: Quoting a catalog record for the 2002 edition, library unknown, OCLC 51611073. Another called it "the true story of Benny" who designed the state flag of Alaska (catalog record for the 1960 edition, library unknown, OCLC 8991673). The Library of Congress assigns to the 2002 edition several "Fiction" subject headings (LCCN 2002-108932). Retrieved 2015-08-16.)
- The Very Little Boy (1962), illus. Ninon; 1992 edition illus. Karen Gundersheimer, LCCN 91-44948
- Susan Sometimes (1962), illus. Abbi Giventer
- The Girl Who Was a Cowboy (1965), illus. Cyndy Szekeres
- The Very Tall Little Girl (1969), illus. Olivia H. H. Cole
- The Shy Little Girl (Houghton Mifflin, 1970), illus. Trina Schart Hyman
- The Popular Girls Club (Simon & Schuster, 1973), illus. Trina Schart Hyman
- L. C. is the Greatest (1975) – 129 pages, OCLC 1551120
- The Man Who Tried to Save Time (1979), illus. Marcia Sewall
- The Man Who Entered a Contest (1980), illus. Yuri Salzman
- The Man Who Cooked for Himself (Parents Magazine Press, 1981), illus. Mamoru Funai
- The First Tulips in Holland (1982), illus. S. D. Schindler – "fictionalized account of how a Dutch merchant brought tulip bulbs from Persia", OCLC 7460219
- The Christmas Tree That Grew (1987), illus. Kathy Wilburn
- The Happy Times Storybook (1987), illus. Ruth Sanderson
- The Man Who Was Too Lazy to Fix Things (1992), illus. John Emil Cymerman
- The Woman Who Saved Things (1993), illus. John Emil Cymerman
