= Mary Calhoun =

- Born: 3 August 1926; Keokuk, Iowa, United States
- Died: 27 October 2015 (aged 89); Boulder, Colorado, United States
- Occupation: Children's author
- Spouses: James Franklin Calhoun (m. 1948; death 1961); Leon Ray Wilkins (m. 1962; death 2015)

Mary Louise Huiskamp Calhoun Wilkins (3 August 1926 - 27 October 2015), known professionally as Mary Calhoun, was an American author of children's and young adult books. She wrote more than 50 titles, including the Katie John series, Julie's Tree, High-Wire Henry, and Cross-Country Cat.

== Biography ==
=== Early life and education ===
Calhoun was born on 3 August 1926 to William Clark and Louisa Belle (Waples) Huiskamp in Keokuk, Iowa, which lies at the confluence of the Mississippi and Des Moines rivers. Several of Calhoun's books are set in the region and feature a large brick house on Blondeau Street that was built by her great-grandfather. At the age of seven, Calhoun decided she wanted to be a writer. After graduating from high school, she attended the University of Iowa where she received a BA in journalism in 1948.

Upon graduation, Calhoun took a job at the Omaha World-Herald in Nebraska. Later that year, she moved to Oregon and took a position at the Gresham Outlook where she served as a society editor until 1949.

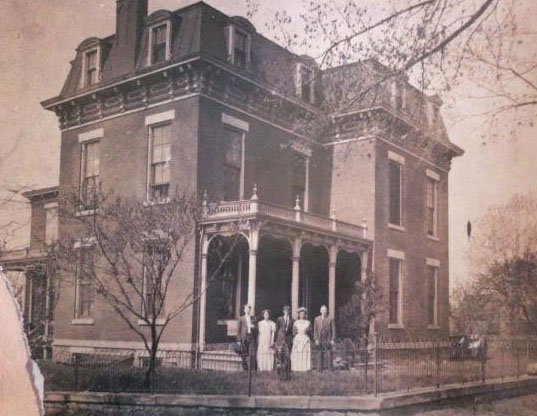
202 Blondeau Street, Keokuk, Iowa

=== Marriage and children ===
While working on the Omaha World Herald, Calhoun met her first husband, fellow journalist James Franklin Calhoun. They married on 2 September 1948 in Portland, Oregon. After their marriage, Mary Calhoun became a homemaker, and the couple had two sons: Michael and Gregory. On 12 August 1961, Frank died of a heart attack. Calhoun married her second husband, Leon Ray Wilkins, on 8 November 1962. Wilkins was a high school friend and an Episcopalian priest. They remained married until Wilkins's death on 23 February 2015.

== Career ==
Calhoun’s storytelling started as a way to entertain her two sons. Later, she began writing the stories down and submitting them to children's magazines. Her first book, Making the Mississippi Shout, was published in 1957. Others followed, and by the 1960s, her titles were appearing in lists of notable children's books. She continued writing and publishing for the next several decades. Her final book, Henry the Christmas Cat, appeared in 2004. The Mississippi River and the American Midwest provide settings for several of her historical and contemporary works, while European folk traditions inform stories involving witches, elves, dwarfs, brownies, and other supernatural figures. Calhoun also stated that strong emotion was an important element in her writing and identified “a strong emotion and a desire to tell the story to certain children” as important aspects of writing for young readers.

=== Critical reception ===
Contemporary reviews discussed Calhoun's characterizations, humor, and treatment of family relationships. Reviewing Katie John for The New York Times Book Review in 1960, Miriam James commented on the characterization of its protagonist. In a 1961 review of Depend on Katie John, Virginia Haviland of The Horn Book discussed the book's varied characters, humor, and depiction of family life. Reviews of Calhoun's other books appeared consistently over the years in several publications, such as Library Journal, Kirkus Reviews, Booklist, and School Library Journal.

== Death and legacy ==
Mary Calhoun died on 27 October 2015 in Boulder, Colorado, at the age of 89. Collections of her papers can be found at the University of Southern Mississippi, the University of Iowa Libraries, and in the Kerlan Collection at the University of Minnesota - Twin Cities.

== Published works ==
Title	Date published	Illustrator	Original publisher
Making the Mississippi Shout	1957	Paul Galdone	William Morrow
The Sweet Patootie Doll	1957	Roger Duvoisin	William Morrow
The River-Minded Boy	1958	William R. Lohse	William Morrow
Wobble, the Witch Cat	1958	Roger Duvoisin	William Morrow
Houn' Dog	1959	Roger Duvoisin	William Morrow
Katie John	1960	Paul Frame	Harper & Row
Cowboy Cal and the Outlaw	1961	Frank Nicholas	William Morrow
Depend on Katie John	1961	Paul Frame	Harper & Row
The Nine Lives of Homer C. Cat	1961	Roger Duvoisin	William Morrow
The Hungry Leprechaun	1962	Roger Duvoisin	William Morrow
Honestly, Katie John!	1963	Paul Frame	Harper & Row
The Witch of Hissing Hill	1964	Janet McCaffery	William Morrow
High Wind for Kansas	1965	W. T. Mars	William Morrow
The House of Thirty Cats	1965	Mary Chalmers	William Morrow
The Runaway Brownie	1967	Janet McCaffery	William Morrow
The Thieving Dwarfs	1967	Janet McCaffery	William Morrow
The Goblin Under the Stairs	1968	Janet McCaffery	William Morrow
The Last Two Elves in Denmark	1968	Janet McCaffery	William Morrow
The Pixy and the Lazy Housewife	1969	Janet McCaffery	William Morrow
The Traveling Ball of String	1969	Janet McCaffery	William Morrow
Magic in the Alley	1970	Janet McCaffery	Atheneum
Mermaid of Storms	1970	Janet McCaffery	William Morrow
White Witch of Kynance	1970	John Gundelfinger	Harper & Row
Camels Are Meaner Than Mules	1971	Herman B. Vestal	Garrard Publishing
Daisy, Tell Me!	1971	Janet McCaffery	William Morrow
It's Getting Beautiful Now	1971	—	Harper & Row
The Flower Mother	1972	Janet McCaffery	William Morrow
Mrs. Dog's Own House	1972	Janet McCaffery	William Morrow
Three Kinds of Stubborn	1972	Edward Malsberg	Garrard Publishing
The Battle of Reuben Robin & Kite Uncle John	1973	Janet McCaffery	William Morrow
The Horse Comes First	1974	John Gretzer	Atheneum
Old Man Whickutt's Donkey	1975	Tomie dePaola	Parents' Magazine Press
Ownself	1975	—	Harper & Row
Euphonia and the Flood	1976	Simms Taaback	Parents' Magazine Press
Medicine Show: Conning People and Making Them Like It	1976	—	Harper & Row
The Witch's Pig: A Cornish Folktale	1977	Lady McCrady	William Morrow
Jack the Wise and the Cornish Cuckoos	1978	Lady McCrady	William Morrow
Cross-Country Cat	1979	Erick Ingraham	William Morrow
The Witch Who Lost Her Shadow	1979	Trinka Hakes Noble	Harper & Row
Katie John and Heathcliff	1980	—	Harper & Row
Audubon Cat	1981	Susan Bonners	William Morrow
Hot-Air Henry	1981	Erick Ingraham	William Morrow
The Night the Monster Came	1982	Leslie H. Morrill	William Morrow
Big Sixteen	1983	Trina Schart Hyman	William Morrow
Jack and the Whoopee Wind	1987	Dick Gackenbach	William Morrow
Julie's Tree	1988	—	Harper & Row
High-Wire Henry	1991	Erick Ingraham	Morrow Junior Books
While I Sleep	1992	Ed Young	Morrow Junior Books
Henry the Sailor Cat	1994	Erick Ingraham	Morrow Junior Books
Tonio's Cat	1996	Edward Martinez	Morrow Junior Books
Flood!	1997	Erick Ingraham	Morrow Junior Books
Blue-Ribbon Henry	1998	Erick Ingraham	Morrow Junior Books
A Shepherd's Gift	2001	Raúl Colón	HarperCollins
Henry the Christmas Cat	2004	Erick Ingraham	HarperCollins

=== Published under the name Mary Huiskamp Calhoun Wilkins ===
- John M. Huiskamp, Artist, Pine Ridge Press (1997)

== Recognition ==
- 1979 Boston Globe–Horn Book Award, Honor Book for Cross-Country Cat
- 1980 Golden Kite Honor Book citation, Society of Children's Book Writers and Illustrators for Cross-Country Cat
- 1981 Colorado Children's Book Award for Cross-Country Cat
- 1982 Washington Children's Choice Picture Book Award for Cross-Country Cat
- 1991 School Library Journal Best Books citation for High-Wire Henry
- 1994 California Young Readers Medal for High-Wire Henry
