= Myra Cohn Livingston =

American poet, writer, and educator (1926–1996)

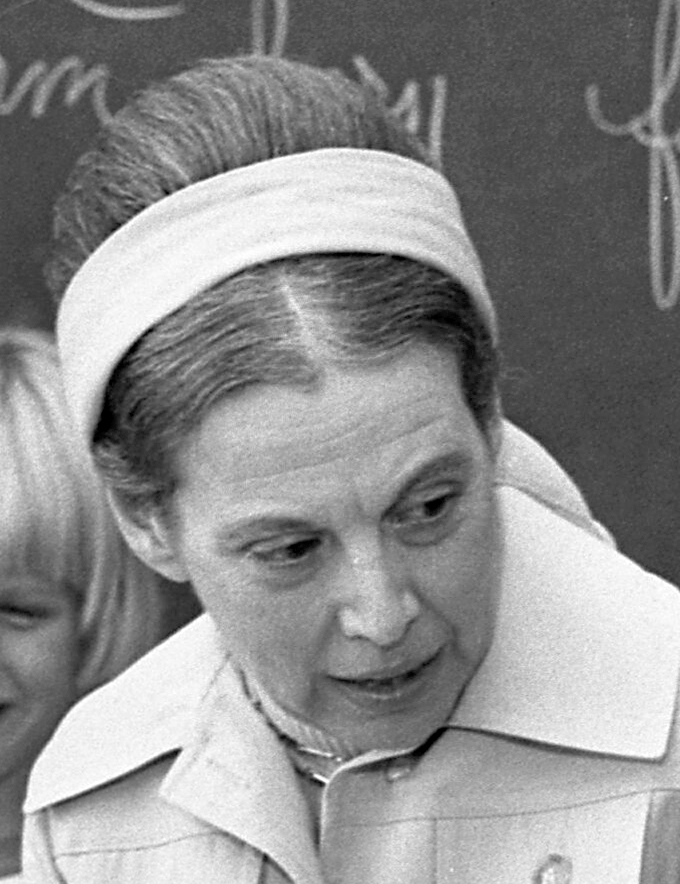
Livingston in 1973

Myra Cohn Livingston (August 17, 1926 – August 23, 1996) was an American poet, writer, and educator who is primarily known for her books of free verse children's poetry.

== Biography ==
=== Early life and education ===
Myra Cohn was born in Omaha, Nebraska. Her family moved to California when she was twelve years old.

She earned a Bachelor of Arts degree from Sarah Lawrence College, where she had studied under Horace Gregory and Robert Fitzgerald, in 1948.

=== Career ===
She was a professional French horn musician from 1941 to 1948 and a book reviewer for the Los Angeles Daily News from 1948 to 1949 and Los Angeles Mirror from 1949 to 1950. She was personal secretary for singer Dinah Shore and for violinist Jascha Heifetz.

She lived in Dallas for thirteen years after she married Richard R. Livingston and she took a year off working, but she decided that she was dissatisfied without a job outside the home. She worked at a bookstore and at the Dallas Public Library as a creative writing instructor. She also published her first of many books of children's poetry, Whispers, and Other Poems (Harcourt, 1958). She had written it twelve years earlier when she was in college. Her early works drew upon her childhood and the experiences of her children.

Her book The Way Things Are, and Other Poems received a Golden Kite Honor Award from the Society of Children's Book Writers in 1974. Poems for Jewish Holidays received a National Jewish Book Award in 1987. She received a Kerlan Award from the University of Minnesota.

Livingston wrote in an article that appeared in Language Arts in March 1978: "No one can teach creative writing.... One can only make children aware of their sensitivities, and help children learn of the forms, the basic tools of poetry, into which they can put their own voices. During these [twenty] years I have touched the lives of thousands of children and I have given praise when it is due, and criticism when it is warranted. But I have never told a child that he is a poet, for I know only too well the years and work it takes to be considered a poet".

Livingston worked as a children's poetry consultant to publishing houses from 1975 to 1996.

Livingston was poet in residence for the Beverly Hills Unified School District from 1966 to 1984. She was a senior extension lecturer at the University of California, Los Angeles, senior extension lecturer, 1973 to 1996. Her students included Kristine O'Connell George, Hope Anita Smith, Sonya Sones, April Halprin Wayland, and Janet S. Wong.

=== Personal life, death, and legacy ===
She married Richard R. Livingston, a certified public accountant, in 1952. He died in 1990. They had three children, one of whom, Jennie, is a filmmaker.

Livingston was a collector of books.

Livingston died of cancer on August 23, 1996, in Beverly Hills, California.

The Children's Literature Council of Southern California's Myra Cohn Livingston Award is named for her.

== Selected works ==
=== Children's poetry books ===
- Whispers, and Other Poems, illustrated by Jacqueline Chwast, Harcourt, 1958.
- Wide Awake, and Other Poems, illustrated by Chwast, Harcourt, 1959.
- I'm Hiding, illustrated by Erik Blegvad, Harcourt, 1961.
- See What I Found, illustrated by Blegvad, Harcourt, 1962.
- I Talk to Elephants, photographs by Isabel Gordon, Harcourt, 1962.
- I'm Not Me, illustrated by Blegvad, Harcourt, 1963.
- Happy Birthday!, illustrated by Blegvad, Harcourt, 1964.
- The Moon and a Star, and Other Poems, illustrated by Judith Shahn, Harcourt, 1965.
- I'm Waiting!, illustrated by Blegvad, Harcourt, 1966.
- Old Mrs. Twindlytart, and Other Rhymes, illustrated by Enrico Arno, Harcourt, 1967.
- A Crazy Flight, and Other Poems, illustrated by James J. Spanfeller, Harcourt, 1969.
- The Malibu, and Other Poems, illustrated by Spanfeller, Atheneum, 1972.
- The Way Things Are, and Other Poems, illustrated by Jenny Oliver, Atheneum, 1974.
- 4-Way Stop, and Other Poems, illustrated by Spanfeller, Atheneum, 1976.
- A Lollygag of Limericks, illustrated by Joseph Low, Atheneum, 1978.
- O Sliver of Liver: Together with Other Triolets, Cinquains, Haiku, Verses, and a Dash of Poems, illustrated by Iris Van Rynbach, Atheneum, 1978.
- No Way of Knowing: Dallas Poems, Atheneum, 1979.
- A Circle of Seasons, illustrated by Leonard Everett Fisher, Holiday House (New York, NY), 1982.
- Sky Songs, illustrated by Fisher, Holiday House, 1984.
- Monkey Puzzle, and Other Poems, illustrated by Antonio Frasconi, Atheneum, 1984.
- A Song I Sang to You: A Selection of Poems, illustrated by Margot Tomes, Harcourt, 1984.
- Celebrations, illustrated by Fisher, Holiday House, 1985.
- Worlds I Know and Other Poems, illustrated by Tim Arnold, Atheneum, 1985.
- Earth Songs, illustrated by Fisher, Holiday House, 1986.
- Higgledy-Piggledy: Verses and Pictures, illustrated by Peter Sis, Macmillan (New York, NY), 1986.
- Sea Songs, illustrated by Fisher, Holiday House, 1986.
- Space Songs, illustrated by Fisher, Holiday House, 1988.
- There Was a Place and Other Poems, Macmillan, 1988.
- Up in the Air, illustrated by Fisher, Holiday House, 1989.
- Birthday Poems, illustrated by Tomes, Holiday House, 1989.
- Remembering, and Other Poems, Macmillan, 1989.
- My Head Is Red and Other Riddle Rhymes, illustrated by Tere Lo Prete, Holiday House, 1990.
- Let Freedom Ring: A Ballad of Martin Luther King, Jr., illustrated by Samuel Byrd, Holiday House, 1992.
- Light and Shadow, photographs by Barbara Rogasky, Holiday House, 1992.
- I Never Told, and Other Poems, McElderry (New York, NY), 1992.
- Abraham Lincoln: A Man for All the People, illustrated by Samuel Byrd, Holiday House, 1993.
- Call Down to the Moon: Poems of Music, HarperCollins (New York, NY), 1994.
- Keep on Singing: A Ballad of Marian Anderson, illustrated by Samuel Byrd, Holiday House, 1994.
- Flights of Fancy and Other Poems, McElderry, 1994.
- B Is For Baby: An Alphabet of Verses, photographs by Steel Stillman, McElderry, 1996.
- Festivals, illustrated by Leonard Everett Fisher, Holiday House, 1996.
- Cricket Never Does: A Collection of Haiku and Tanka, Margaret K. McElderry Books (New York, NY), 1997.

=== Adult non-fiction ===
- When You Are Alone / It Keeps You Capone: An Approach to Creative Writing with Children, Atheneum (New York, NY), 1973.
- Come Away (fiction for children), illustrated by Irene Haas, Atheneum, 1974.
- A Tribune to Lloyd Alexander, Drexel Institute (Philadelphia), 1976.
- The Child as Poet: Myth or Reality?, Horn Book (Boston), 1984.
- Climb into the Bell Tower: Essays on Poetry, Harper (New York City), 1990.
- Poem-Making: Ways to Begin Writing Poetry, Harper, 1991.
- (Translator with Joseph F. Dominguez) Juan R. Jimenez, Platero and I, illustrated by Antonio Frasconi, Houghton (Boston), 1993.

=== Collections edited ===
- A Tune beyond Us: A Collection of Poetry, illustrated by Spanfeller, Harcourt, 1968.
- Speak Roughly to Your Little Boy: A Collection of Parodies and Burlesques, Together with the Original Poems, Chosen and Annotated for Young People, illustrated by Low, Harcourt, 1971.
- Listen, Children, Listen: An Anthology of Poems for the Very Young, illustrated by Trina Schart Hyman, Harcourt, 1972.
- What a Wonderful Bird the Frog Are: An Assortment of Humorous Poetry and Verse, Atheneum, 1973.
- The Poems of Lewis Carroll, illustrated by John Tenniel and others, Crowell (New York, NY), 1973.
- One Little Room, An Everywhere: Poems of Love, illustrated by Frasconi, Atheneum, 1975.
- O Frabjous Day! Poetry for Holidays, and Special Occasions, Atheneum, 1977.
- Callooh! Callay!: Holiday Poems for Young Readers, illustrated by Janet Stevens, Atheneum, 1979.
- Poems of Christmas, Atheneum, 1980.
- Why Am I Grown So Cold?: Poems of the Unknowable, Macmillan, 1982.
- How Pleasant to Know Mr. Lear!, Holiday House, 1982.
- Christmas Poems, illustrated by Hyman, Holiday House, 1984.
- (With Zena Sutherland) The Scott, Foresman Anthology of Children's Literature, Scott, Foresman (Glenview, IL), 1984.
- Easter Poems, illustrated by John Wallner, Holiday House, 1985.
- Thanksgiving Poems, illustrated by Stephen Gammell, Holiday House, 1985.
- A Learical Lexicon: A Magnificent Feast of Boshblobberbosh and Fun from the Works of Edward Lear, illustrated by Low, Atheneum, 1985.
- Poems for Jewish Holidays, illustrated by Lloyd Bloom, Holiday House, 1986.
- New Year's Poems, illustrated by Tomes, Holiday House, 1987.
- Valentine Poems, illustrated by Patricia Brewster, Holiday House, 1987.
- Cat Poems, illustrated by Hyman, Holiday House, 1987.
- I Like You, If You Like Me: Poems of Friendship, Macmillan, 1987.
- (With Norma Farber) These Small Stones, Harper, 1987.
- Poems for Mothers, illustrated by Deborah Kogan Ray, Holiday House, 1988.
- Poems for Fathers, illustrated by Robert Casilla, Holiday House, 1989.
- Halloween Poems, illustrated by Gammell, Holiday House, 1989.
- Dilly Dilly Piccalilli: Poems for the Very Young, illustrated by Eileen Christelow, Macmillan, 1989.
- If the Owl Calls Again, illustrated by Frasconi, Macmillan, 1990.
- Dog Poems, illustrated by Leslie Morrill, Holiday House, 1990.
- Poems for Grandmothers, illustrated by Patricia Callen-Clark, Holiday House, 1990.
- Poems for Brothers, Poems for Sisters, illustrated by Jean Zallinger, Holiday House, 1991.
- Lots of Limericks, Macmillan, 1991.
- If You Ever Meet a Whale, illustrated by Leonard Everett Fisher, Holiday House, 1992.
- A Time to Talk: Poems of Friendship, McElderry, 1992.
- Read Along: Poems on Wheels, McElderry, 1993.
- Riddle-me Rhymes, McElderry, 1994.
- Animal, Vegetable, Mineral: Poems about Small Things, HarperCollins (New York, NY), 1994.
- Call Down the Moon: Poems of Music, McElderry, 1995.
