= The Night Journey (novel) =

1981 novel by Kathryn Lasky

- First edition
- Author: Kathryn Lasky
- Illustrator: Trina Schart Hyman
- Cover artist: Trina Schart Hyman
- Language: English
- Genre: Children's historical novel
- Publisher: Frederick Warne
- Media type: Print (Hardback)
- ISBN: 0723262012
- Preceded by: N/A
- Followed by: Broken Song

The Night Journey is a 1981 novel by Kathryn Lasky, and illustrated by Trina Schart Hyman.

== Plot overview ==
Nana Sashie (an Ashkenazi Jewish woman born in Mykolaiv in what is now Ukraine) tells her great-grandchild, Rachel, of her escape from the Russian Empire during the early 1900s, when pogroms were common. Nana Sashie refuses to eat for a week with the intention of dying, and passes away. Before moving to Minnesota, Nana Sashie was married to Reuven Bloom for 40 years.

Open Court Reading took the book and shortened it, giving Rachel the name "Rache". The story starts with a background of the story and the story from Ed's gift – a samovar – and Nana Sashie looking upset. When Rachel sneaks into Nana Sashie's room to look at the samovar, she ends up hearing Nana's tale.

== Awards ==
1982: National Jewish Book Award in the Children's Literature category
