= Fletcher Hodges Jr. =

- Born: August 6, 1905
- Died: March 13, 2006 (aged 100)
- Education: Harvard University
- Spouse: Margaret Hodges

Fletcher Hodges Jr. (August 6, 1905 – March 13, 2006) was an American who curated the Foster Hall Collection, a collection of documents and music related to Stephen Foster at the University of Pittsburgh, for fifty-one years.

== Biography ==
"One of the chief activities of Foster Hall has been the publication of Songs of Stephen Foster, a collection of the composer's best works, arranged for schools and general use. During the past nineteen years, approximately a million copies of these song books have been presented to schools, libraries, churches, musical organizations, and the armed forces, in all parts of the United States and of the world."

— Hodges Jr. on the activities of Foster Hall, 1953

Hodges, an Indiana native, graduated from Harvard University. He was hired during the Great Depression by Josiah K. Lilly Sr., owner of the Eli Lilly and Company pharmaceutical corporation, to organize the Lilly family's archive of Foster materials, which then numbered 20,000 items. Lilly was a friend of University of Pittsburgh Chancellor John Gabbert Bowman, and he later donated the archive in 1937 to Bowman's newly constructed Stephen Foster Memorial on the Pitt campus. Hodges moved from Indianapolis to Pittsburgh, Pennsylvania with the collection.

== Personal life ==
Hodges' wife, Margaret Hodges, was a Caldecott Medal winning writer of books for children. She preceded him in death in December 2005.

After contraction of pneumonia, Hodges Jr. died on March 13, 2006, at a retirement home in Oakmont, Pennsylvania.

== Bibliography ==
- Stephen Foster: America's Troubadour (co-written with John Tasker Howard), New York — Thomas Y. Crowell Company, 1934.
- A Pittsburgh Composer and his Memorial. Pittsburgh — Historical Society of Western Pennsylvania, 1938?
- Stephen Foster, Democrat. Pittsburgh — University of Pittsburgh, 1945.
- The Research Work of the Foster Hall Collection. Philadelphia — Pennsylvania Historical Association, 1948.
- Stephen Foster. An address by Mr. Fletcher Hodges Jr., given at the 1949 Annual Meeting of the Historical and Philosophical Society of Ohio. Cincinnati — Printed and bound by the C.J. Krehbiel Co., 1950.
- Swanee River and a Biographical Sketch of Stephen Collins Foster, White Springs, Florida. — Stephen Foster Memorial Association, 1958.
