= True North (novel) =

1996 historical novel by Kathryn Lasky

- First edition
- Author: Kathryn Lasky
- Language: English
- Publication date: 1996

True North is a 1996 historical novel for young adults by Kathryn Lasky, and published by Scholastic Corporation. Set in 1850s America, it is a story about the Underground Railroad. Afrika, a slave girl from Virginia, and Lucy, an independent girl constricted by Boston society, take different paths in life, with Lucy exploring her family's history, and Afrika desperately searching for freedom, narrowly escaping capture.
