= Staryi Ostropil =

Village in Khmelnytskyi Oblast, Ukraine

Staryi Ostropil Старий Остропіль
- Village
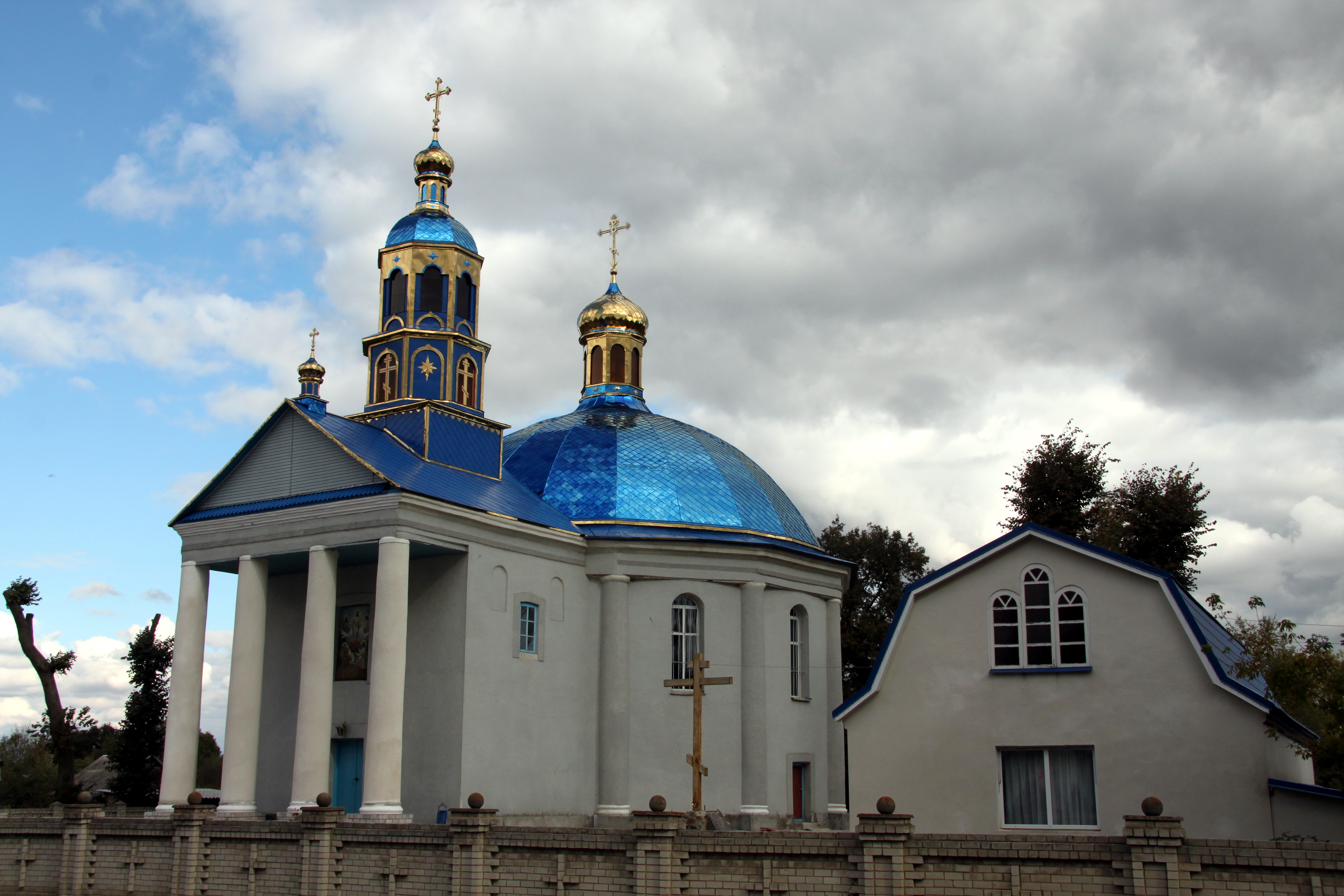
- Church of the Transfiguration in Staryi Ostropil

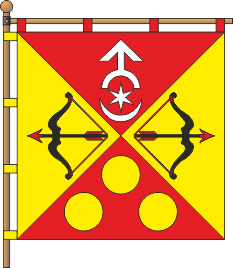
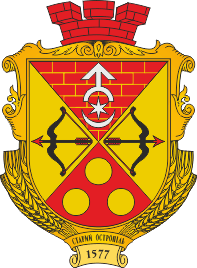
- Flag Coat of arms

- Location within Khmelnytskyi Oblast Location within Ukraine
- Coordinates: 49°47′52″N 27°33′51″E
- Country: Ukraine
- Oblast: Khmelnytskyi Oblast
- Raion: Khmelnytskyi Raion

Area
  - Total: 4,485 km^{2} (1,732 sq mi)
- Elevation: 262 m (860 ft)

Population (2001)
  - Total: 1,374
  - Density: 0.3064/km^{2} (0.7935/sq mi)
- Time zone: UTC+2 (EET)
  - Summer (DST): UTC+3 (EEST)
- Postal code: 31146
- Dialling code: +380 3854

Staryi Ostropil (Ukrainian: Старий Остропіль), also known as Ostropil (Ukrainian: Остропіль), is a village on the Sluch River located in Khmelnytskyi Raion, Khmelnytskyi Oblast about 133 miles (222 km) WSW of Kyiv, Ukraine. It hosts the administration of Staryi Ostropil rural hromada, one of the hromadas of Ukraine. Staryi Ostropil is located at latitude 49°48' N, longitude 27°34' E and is situated at an altitude of 742.5 feet (225 m). The town of Lyubar is 11.1 miles (18.5 km) from Staryi Ostropil.

Ostropil was an important Jewish center in the 17th century and was mentioned in many contemporary texts including the birthplace of the noted Rabbi, Kabbalist and martyr Samson ben Pesah Ostropoli. Its Jewish population was wiped out along with that of Starokostiantyniv by the Nazis in 1942 before being liberated by the Red Army in 1945. The 5200 murdered Jews have since been commemorated at the Holocaust Memorial Park in Brooklyn, New York.

Until 18 July 2020, Staryi Ostropil belonged to Starokostiantyniv Raion. The raion was abolished in July 2020 as part of the administrative reform of Ukraine, which reduced the number of raions of Khmelnytskyi Oblast to three. The area of Starokostiantyniv Raion was merged into Khmelnytskyi Raion.

There are two cemeteries, one across the street from the other. Both are in a dilapidated condition.

== Notable people ==
- S. S. Koteliansky, translator, publisher, and literary scholar
- Samson ben Pesah Ostropoli was born in Ostropil
- The hero of Jewish humor, Hershele Ostropoler, was from that town
- Grandparents of American filmmaker James Gray
- V. Volodarsky, was a Marxist revolutionary and Soviet politician
