= Figgie Hobbin =

Book by Charles Causley

- Author: Charles Causley
- Illustrator: Pat Marriott; Trina Schart Hyman (1974); Gerald Rose (1993)
- Cover artist: Pat Marriott; Trina Schart Hyman (1974); Gerald Rose (1993)
- Language: English
- Genre: Children's poetry
- Publisher: Macmillan
- Publication date: 1970
- Publication place: England
- Media type: hardback
- ISBN: 0-333-12078-7
- OCLC: 22729750
- Dewey Decimal: 821/.9/14
- LC Class: PZ8.3.C3134 Fi

Figgie Hobbin: Poems for Children is a children's poetry collection written by the Cornish poet Charles Causley and first published in 1970. Since then it has gone through numerous reprints, including a notable version published in the United States in 1974, with illustrations by Trina Schart Hyman. It is dedicated to the artist Stanley Simmonds and his wife Cynthia.

The poems' subjects are fairly evenly split between gentle introspection and delighting in random nonsense. The poem from which the book gets its title speaks of the old King of Cornwall, tempted with all sorts of exotic dishes, who petulantly tells his servants to take it all away and bring him what he really wants—a humble dish of figgie hobbin. (Figgy hobbin:- plain pastry, cooked with a handful of raisins (raisins being "figs" and figs "broad raisins").

== Poems ==
Note: the following poems are printed in the U.S. edition of the book. The U.K. edition may contain a slightly different collection of poems.

- I saw a jolly hunter
- A fox came into my garden
- 'Quack!' said the billy goat
- Colonel Fazackerley
- Tell me, tell me, Sarah Jane
- As I went down Zig Zag
- Logs of wood
- Old Mrs. Thing-um-e-bob
- King Foo Foo
- Riley
- At nine of the night I opened my door
- My mother saw a dancing bear
- Figgie Hobbin
