= Album of Dinosaurs =

- Author: Tom McGowen
- Illustrator: Rod Ruth
- Language: English
- Publisher: Rand McNally
- Publication date: 1972
- Media type: Print Hardcover
- Pages: 60
- ISBN: 0-528-82024-9
- OCLC: 324218
- Dewey Decimal: 568/.19
- LC Class: QE862.D5 M28

Album of Dinosaurs is a dinosaur book written by Tom McGowen and illustrated by Rod Ruth.

The book was first published by Rand McNally & Company in 1972. It was first published in Spanish in 1985 and then published again in 1987 by Fernández Editores, México, DF, and translated by Jorge Blanco y Correa; the book was published under the name El Gran Libro de Dinosaurios.

The book contains a chapter on dinosaurs in general as well as individual chapters on Coelophysis, Apatosaurus, Stegosaurus, Allosaurus, Iguanodon, Compsognathus, Anatosaurus, Protoceratops, Triceratops, Tyrannosaurus, Ankylosaurus, and Struthiomimus.
