= Allen Mandelbaum =

American writer

Allen Mandelbaum (May 4, 1926 – October 27, 2011) was an American professor of literature and the humanities, poet, and translator from Classical Greek, Latin and Italian. His translations of classic works gained him numerous awards in Italy and the United States.

== Early life and education ==
He was born in Albany, New York in 1926 and at age 13 moved with his family to Manhattan. After beginning his higher education at Yeshiva University, he studied English and comparative literature at Columbia University, receiving his master's degree in 1946 and his doctorate in 1951. He then spent 15 years in Italy.

== Academic career ==
He taught English and comparative literature at the Graduate Center of the City University of New York from 1966 to 1986 and served as executive officer of the Ph.D. Program in English from 1972 to 1980. In 1989 he was named the W. R. Kenan Jr. Professor of Humanities at Wake Forest University.

== Translations ==
His translation of the Divine Comedy of Dante Alighieri appeared between 1980 and 1984; they were published by the University of California Press and supported by the notable Dante scholar Irma Brandeis. He subsequently acted as general editor of the California Lectura Dantis, a collection of essays on the Comedy; two volumes, on the Inferno and Purgatorio, have been published. Mandelbaum received the 1973 National Book Award in category Translation for Virgil's Aeneid. In 2000, Mandelbaum traveled to Florence, Italy, for the 735th anniversary of Dante's birth, and was awarded the Gold Medal of Honor of the City of Florence for his translation of the Divine Comedy. In 2003, he was awarded The Presidential Prize for Translation from the President of Italy, and received Italy's highest award, the Presidential Cross of the Order of the Star of Italian Solidarity.

In 1994, he was one of three finalists for the Pulitzer Prize in Poetry specifically for his translation of the Metamorphoses of Ovid.

== Awards ==
- 1973: National Book Award for translation
- 2000: City of Florence Gold Medal of Honor
- 2003: Italian Presidential Prize for Translation
- 2003: Italian Presidential Cross of the Order of the Star of Italian Solidarity
- Order of Merit from the Republic of Italy
- Premio Mondello
- Premio Leonardo
- Premio Biella
- Premio Lerici-Pea
- Premio Montale at the Montale Centenary in Rome
- Circe-Sabaudia Award

== Death and legacy ==
He died in Winston-Salem, North Carolina in 2011. His nephew was author Paul Auster.

== Published works ==
=== Verse ===
- Journeyman
- Leaves of Absence
- Chelmaxioms: the maxims, axioms, maxioms of Chelm (1977)
  Chelmaxioms treats the Wise Men of Chelm less as fools than as an "echt Chelm" of true scholars who in their narrow specialized knowledge are nonetheless knowledgeable but lacking sense. The poetry of Chelmaxioms is supposedly coming from the discovered lost manuscripts of the wise men of Chelm.
  A stanza from Chelmaxioms was used for the chorus in the 2006 composition "Shofar: an oratorio for soprano, tenor, two bass-baritones, chorus and orchestra" by Catherine Madsen and Robert Stern.
- A Lied of Letterpress for Moser and McGrath (1980)
- The Savantasse of Montparnasse

=== Translations ===
==== Classics ====
- The Aeneid of Virgil (rev. 1971). New York: Bantam. 1981. ISBN 0-553-21041-6.
- Homer's Odyssey. New York: Bantam. 1991. ISBN 978-0-553-21399-7.
- Ovid's Metamorphoses
- The Divine Comedy of Dante Alighieri: Inferno (1980). New York: Bantam. 1982. ISBN 0-553-21339-3.
- The Divine Comedy of Dante Alighieri: Purgatorio (1982). New York: Bantam. 1984. ISBN 0-553-21344-X.
- The Divine Comedy of Dante Alighieri: Paradiso (1984). New York: Bantam. 1986. ISBN 0-553-21204-4.

==== Contemporary Italian poetry ====
- The Selected Writings of Salvatore Quasimodo (1960)
- Selected poems of Giuseppe Ungaretti. Ithaca: Cornell UP. 1975. ISBN 0-8014-0850-4.

=== Edited work ===
- Mandelbaum, Allen; Anthony Oldcorn; Charles Ross (1998). Lectura Dantis: Inferno. A Canto-by-Canto Commentary. Berkeley: University of California Press. ISBN 978-0-520-21270-1.
- Mandelbaum, Allen; Anthony Oldcorn; Charles Ross (2008). Lectura Dantis: Purgatorio. A Canto-by-Canto Commentary. Berkeley: University of California Press. ISBN 978-0-520-25056-7.
