= Ovsey Driz =

Soviet poet writing in Yiddish (1908–1971)

Ovsey Ovseyevich Driz, birth name Yehoshua "Shike" Driz (Yiddish: יהושע (שיקע) דריז) (1908–1971) was a Soviet poet of Ukrainian Jewish origin, known for poems written in Yiddish and Russian. His Russian poems are usually translations from Yiddish. During 1960s–1980s, as Ovsey Driz, he was particularly famous in the Soviet Union for his children's poems, published in 55 children's books. Several animated films uses Driz's poems.

== Biography ==
Shike Dris started writing in Yiddish by the end of 1920s. Initially he was publishing in Yiddish magazines, and two books of his collections of poems were published. His poems continued to be published in magazines until the infamous year of 1948, the year of the Case of the Jewish Anti-Fascist Committee. In 1934 he enlisted into the Soviet Border Troops and demobilized in 1947, after World War II. Probably for this reason he was off the radar at the height of the Stalinist repression of Jewish intellectuals. In 1961, the Jews were permitted to have their magazine Sovetish Heymland ("Soviet Homeland"), and Driz started publishing there. During the hiatus he took odd menial jobs, including the job of a lapidarist, cutting sculptures in workshops of the USSR Art Fund. For the latter he was chastised by the bureaucrats of the Union of Soviet Writers, who wrote a letter to Khrushchev complaining about the unproportionally high numbers of Jewish members of the Union, in which Driz was given as an example of a person who is not even a writer, yet a member.
