= Charles Causley =

Cornish poet and educator (1917–2003)

- Pencil drawing of Causley by Stanley Simmonds
- Born: 24 August 1917; Launceston, Cornwall
- Died: 4 November 2003 (aged 86); Launceston, Cornwall
- Resting place: St Thomas Churchyard, Launceston, Cornwall
- Writing career
- Genres: Poetry (ballads, other formal poetic structures and free verse; also, children's poetry); short plays, including for radio; libretti; short stories; essays and criticism.
- Notable works: Collected Poems, 1951–1997; Collected Poems for Children; individual poems including 'Timothy Winters', 'Eden Rock' and many more

Charles Stanley Causley CBE FRSL (24 August 1917 – 4 November 2003) was a Cornish poet, school teacher and writer. His work is often noted for its simplicity and directness as well as its associations with folklore, legends and magic, especially when linked to his native Cornwall.

== Early life ==
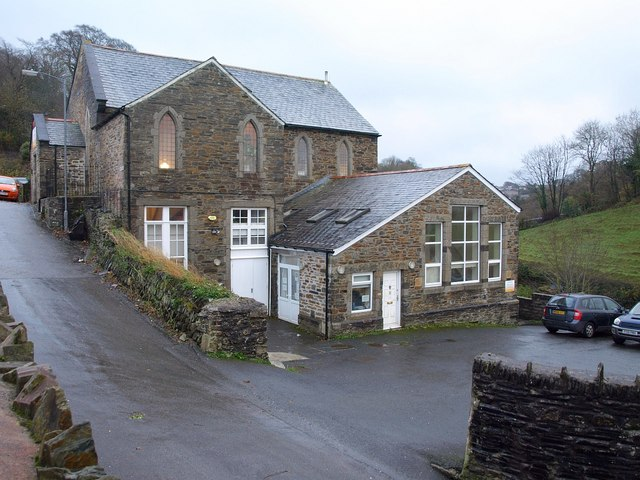
Former National School, Launceston, where Causley was both pupil and teacher

Causley was born at Launceston, Cornwall, to Charles Samuel Causley, who worked as a groom and gardener, and his wife Laura Jane Bartlett, who was in domestic service. He was educated at the local primary school and Launceston College. When he was seven, in 1924, his father died from long-standing injuries incurred in World War I.

Causley left school at 16, working as a clerk in a builder's office. He played in a semi-professional dance band, and wrote plays—one of which was broadcast on the BBC West Country service before World War II.

== Career ==
He enlisted in the Royal Navy in 1940 and served as an ordinary seaman during the Second World War, firstly aboard the destroyer HMS Eclipse in the Atlantic, at shore bases in Gibraltar and northwest England. Later he served in the Pacific on the aircraft carrier HMS Glory, after promotion to petty officer.

Causley later wrote about his wartime experiences (and their longer-term impact on him) in his poetry, and also in a book of short stories, Hands to Dance and Skylark. His first collection of poems, Farewell, Aggie Weston (1951) contained the 'Song of the Dying Gunner A.A.1': (Note: "Guz" - Devonport; "tiddley suit" - very smart suit.)

Farewell, Aggie Weston, the Barracks at Guz,
Hang my tiddley suit on the door
I'm sewn up neat in a canvas sheet
And I shan't be home no more.

The collection Survivor's Leave followed in 1953, and from then until his death Causley published frequently, in magazines, in his own volumes and shared ones, in anthologies and then in several editions of his Collected Poems.

After demobilisation in 1946, he took advantage of a government scheme to train as a teacher at Peterborough. He then worked full-time as a teacher at his old school for over 35 years, teaching for his very final year at St. Catherine's CofE Primary elsewhere in the town, where the National School had been relocated. He twice spent time in Perth as a visiting Fellow at the University of Western Australia, and also worked at the Banff School of Fine Arts in Canada.

Causley travelled still more widely and frequently, however, after taking early retirement in 1976 to pursue a full-time career in writing.

He was much in demand at poetry readings in the United Kingdom and worldwide—the latter travels were sometimes as part of Arts Council and British Council initiatives. He also made many television and radio appearances over the post-war period, particularly for the BBC in the West Country, and as the presenter for many years of the BBC Radio 4 series Poetry Please.

Though an intensely private person, Caulsley was nevertheless approachable and friendly. He corresponded with, and was well-acquainted with, writers like Siegfried Sassoon, A. L. Rowse, Susan Hill, Jack Clemo and Ted Hughes (his closest friend)—and a host of other figures from the literary, publishing and wider cultural spheres around the world, as well the southwest region.

In addition to Causley's poetry dealing with issues of faith, folklore, memory, his wartime experience and its later impact, landscape, travel, friends and family, his poems for children were and remain very popular. He used to say that he could have lived comfortably on the fees paid for the reproduction of 'Timothy Winters':

Timothy Winters comes to school
With eyes as wide as a football pool,
Ears like bombs and teeth like splinters:
A blitz of a boy is Timothy Winters.
—first verse

So come one angel, come on ten:
Timothy Winters says "Amen
Amen amen amen amen."
Timothy Winters, Lord.
Amen.
—last verse

In 1952 Causley was made a bard of Gorsedh Kernow adopting the bardic name Morvardh (Sea poet). In 1958 Causley was made a Fellow of the Royal Society of Literature, and he was made a CBE in 1986. When he was 83 years old he was made a Companion of Literature by the Royal Society of Literature: he greeted this award with the words, "My goodness, what an encouragement!"

Other awards include the Queen's Gold Medal for Poetry in 1967 and a Cholmondeley Award in 1971. In 1973/74 he was visiting fellow in poetry at the University of Exeter, from which institution he received an honorary doctorate on 7 July 1977.. In April 1982 he was awarded an honorary Open University degree at their Exeter University ceremony. ( personal recollection Neville Chapman)

He was presented with the Heywood Hill Literary Prize in 2000. Between 1962 and 1966 he was a member of the Poetry Panel of the Arts Council of Great Britain. He was twice awarded a travelling scholarship by the Society of Authors. There was a campaign to have him appointed Poet Laureate on the death of Sir John Betjeman, but in the end, that role was given to Ted Hughes. Causley himself was not very keen on the idea. However, to the people of his home town, he became "the greatest poet laureate we never had". He was interviewed by Roy Plomley on Desert Island Discs on 1 December 1979: his music choices included five classical selections and three others, while his chosen book was Boswell's Life of Johnson.

In 1982, on his 65th birthday, a book of poems was published in his honour that included contributions from Ted Hughes, Seamus Heaney, Philip Larkin and twenty-three other poets, testifying to the respect and indeed love that the British poetry community had for him. This was followed by a fuller and more wide-ranging tribute (including some unpublished reflective essays, and reproductions of several drafts of his poem 'Immunity' from his archive at Exeter University), published in 1987 and entitled Causley at 70.

Causley's popularity amongst general readers and listeners, particularly among the Cornish, remains high, and also appears to be expanding. A Causley piece that has gained attention is "Eden Rock", a reflection on childhood, memory, family and mortality. Its opening lines are:

They are waiting for me somewhere beyond Eden Rock:
My father, twenty-five, in the same suit
Of Genuine Irish Tweed, his terrier Jack
Still two years old and trembling at his feet.

Poet Laureate Sir Andrew Motion has said that if he could write a line as perfect as the one which closes this poem, he would go to his grave a happy man. The full text of "Eden Rock" accompanies a recording on the Poetry Archive website of Causley himself reading it (amongst several other poems) aloud, shortly before his death in 2003.

== Reception ==
According to the Norton Anthology of Children's Literature, "because his characteristic themes, preoccupations, and freshness of language vary little, it is often difficult to distinguish between his writings for children and those for adults. He himself declared that he did know whether a given poem was for children or adults as he was writing it, and he included his children's poetry without comment in his collected works."

Causley stayed true to what he called his 'guiding principle', adopted from Auden and others, that: "while there are some good poems which are only for adults, because they presuppose adult experience in their readers, there are no good poems which are only for children."

His close friend Ted Hughes said of Causley:

"Among the English poetry of the last half century, Charles Causley's could well turn out to be the best loved and most needed.... Before I was made Poet Laureate, I was asked to name my choice of the best poet for the job. Without hesitation, I named Charles Causley—this marvellously resourceful, original poet, yet among all known poets the only one who could be called a man of the people, in the old, best sense. A poet for whom the title might have been invented afresh. I was pleased to hear that in an unpublished letter, Philip Larkin thought the same and chose him too."

Perhaps because of that widespread perception of Causley as a poetic 'outsider', academia has so far paid less attention to his work than it might have done. However, the publication over recent years of a book of critical essays edited by Michael Hanke, OCLC 776765173 Through the Granite Kingdom], as well as a number of dissertations about Causley's work (alone, or alongside poets such as Larkin and R. S. Thomas) suggest that this situation is changing.

== Legacy ==
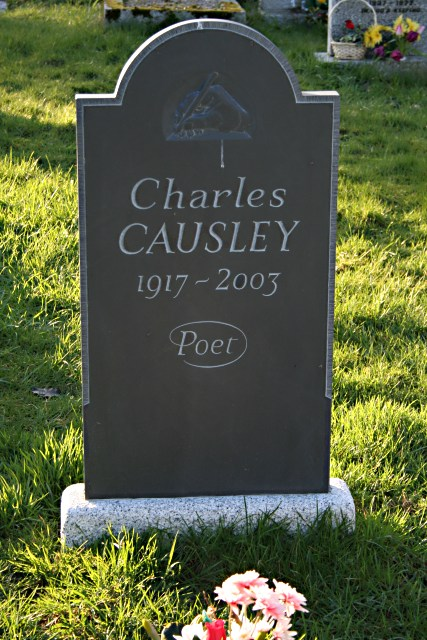
Causley's grave in St Thomas Churchyard in Launceston, Cornwall, is barely 100 yards from where he was born

The Charles Causley Trust, a registered charity, exists to celebrate his life and work and promote new literature activity in the community and region in which he lived. In 2006, the trust secured Cyprus Well, the poet's small house in Launceston, for the nation. After considerable repairs, refurbishment and upgrading, that has been opened on a limited basis to the public, and to provide a facility for a varied programme of activities. Most particularly, there has been a series of residencies for writers of all kinds, artists and musicians, as well as other heritage events. These promote both Causley's life and work, and the arts in general—especially across the South West region of Cornwall and Devon.

In June 2010, the first of a continuing series of annual Charles Causley Festivals took place in Launceston, held over a long weekend. Festival programmes encompass literature, music, art and a variety of other fields for adults, families and children, featuring performers and other contributors from the local area, the region, the whole of the UK, and even worldwide.

Subsequently, festivals have taken place in and around the town for varying periods of up to a full week or more. Over the years, poets such as Sir Andrew Motion (former Poet Laureate, and patron of the Causley Trust), Dame Carol Ann Duffy, Brian Patten and Lemn Sissay, novelists like Patrick Gale, journalists such as George Alagiah, and illustrators like John Lawrence have been headliners.

Music at the festival has included regular appearances from Causley's distant relative, folk singer Jim Causley. featuring his settings of Causley poems, some of which have been recorded for commercial CDs.

The fifth festival in June 2014 was prefaced by the unveiling of a memorial plaque at Cyprus Well (another one later marked his nearby birthplace near St Thomas Church and the River Kensey). That festival also marked the centenary of the start of the First World War with a series of talks on war poetry. A documentary film about Causley's life and work, made by Jane Darke and Andrew Tebbs of Boatshed Films, featured in several versions across the 6th and 7th festivals (2015 and 2016). A shortened version of the full 1990 film, The Poet: Charles Causley, was broadcast on BBC4 as Charles Causley: Cornwall's Native Poet on 1 October 2017.

The June 2017 festival (the 8th) marked the centenary of Causley's birth in August 1917. There were rare performances of several of Causley's one-act plays from the 1930s, and a session from the illustrator John Lawrence and Gaby Morgan marking the reissue of Charles Causley's Collected Poems for Children. The 2018 festival (the 9th) was headlined by poet and broadcaster Roger McGough, while the 10th festival was in June 2019.

In terms of Causley's musical legacy, an original opera by Steven McNeff based on Causley's libretto 'The Burning Boy', was premiered by the Bournemouth Symphony Orchestra's Kokoro Ensemble in Launceston and St. Ives in November 2017. The majority of the songs of Alex Atterson (1931–1996) are settings of Causley poems.

An art exhibition entitled 'Charles Causley: A Tribute from the Artists' was organised to coincide with Causley's 70th birthday in 1987 by Ron Tamplin of Exeter University, and featured a wide range of paintings, drawings, photographs and sculptures. It later transferred from the University to the Institute of Education in Russell Square, London, for a period; an illustrated catalogue was published.

Mother's Boy (2022) is a fictional account of Causley's youth by Patrick Gale, a patron of the Charles Causley Trust, who used Causley's poems and diary. The novel touches on Causley's homosexuality which, according to Gale, the trustees were keen to see addressed, as there had been a feeling it had been the important missing element from public narratives of Causley.

== International poetry competitions ==
The Charles Causley International Poetry Prize is administered by the Causley Trust and is open to anyone over the age of 18. It began in 2013 and has continued in most years since, with a steadily-increasing number of entries. There are a number of monetary prizes and a good deal of publicity for the prize-winning poets and those achieving honourable mentions.

After its early years, it developed into an international competition. In 2018, the announcements and presentations were hosted by Paul Tyler, Lord Linkinhorne (a patron of the Causley Trust), at the House of Lords.

The following is a list of the competition winners and judges to date:

=== 2013 ===
1st prize – Jo Bell, 'The Icicle Garden'. Judge: Sir Andrew Motion

=== 2014 ===
1st prize – Angela Readman, 'The Museum of Water'. Judge: Kathryn Simmonds

=== 2015 ===
1st prize – Claire Dyer, 'Trust and the Horse'. Judges: Antony Caleshu, Miriam Darlington, Kim Martindale and Ronald Tamplin.

=== 2016 ===
1st prize – Jack Thacker, 'The Load'. Judge: Sir Andrew Motion

=== 2017 ===
(The competition was suspended for this year.)

=== 2018 ===
1st prize – Judy O'Kane, 'Tasting Notes'. Judge: Sir Andrew Motion

=== 2019 ===
1st prize – Luke Allen, 'First Winter in Iceland'. Judge: Michael Rosen

=== 2020 ===
1st prize – Elena Croitoru, 'Tower Block Twelve'. Judge: Lemn Sissay

=== 2021 ===
1st prize – Matthew Canavan 'Apropos of Nothing.' Head Judge: Vahni Anthony Capildeo.

=== 2022 ===
1st prize – Vera K Yuen, 'Chinese Diacritics of War & Peace.' Head Judge Seán Hewitt.

=== 2023 ===
No prize was awarded in 2023

=== 2024 ===
1st prize – Anastasia Taylor-Lind, 'Blessing.' Head Judge: Pascale Petit

=== 2025 ===
y Sharman 'Complaints about pigeons and the loss of goldfinches'

In recent years, the Causley Trust has also administered a children's (now young person's) poetry competition. The judges for that have included Jackie Kay, David Devanny, Patrick Gale and Penelope Shuttle (some of whom are either patrons or trustees of the Causley Trust).

== Main publications ==
=== Books primarily intended for adult readers ===
- Hands to Dance (short stories, later re-published as Hands to Dance and Skylark) (1951)
- Farewell, Aggie Weston (1951)
- Survivor's Leave (1953)
- Union Street (1957)
- Johnny Alleluia (1961)
- Underneath the Water (1968)
- Secret Destinations (1984)
- Twenty-One Poems (1986)
- A Field of Vision (1988)
- Collected Poems: several editions, starting in 1975 and culminating with Collected Poems 1951–2000 (2000)

=== Books and longer poems for young readers ===
- Figure of 8 (narrative poems, 1969)
- Figgie Hobbin: Poems for Children (1970)
- 'Quack!' Said the Billy-Goat (c.1970)
- The Tail of the Trinosaur (1972)
- As I Went Down Zig Zag (1974)
- When Dad Felt Bad (1975). In the Little Nippers series.
- The Hill of the Fairy Calf (1976)
- Dick Whittington (1976)
- The Song of the Shapes (1977)
- Twenty-Four Hours (1977)
- The Animals' Carol (1978)
- The Gift of a Lamb (1985)
- Early in the Morning: A Collection of New Poems (1986), with music by Anthony Castro and illustrations by Michael Foreman
- Jack the Treacle Eater (Macmillan, 1987), illustrated by Charles Keeping – winner of the Kurt Maschler Award, or the Emil, for integrated writing and illustration
- The Young Man of Cury and Other Poems (1991)
- All Day Saturday, and Other Poems (1994)
- Collected Poems for Children (1996, reprinted 2017), illustrated by John Lawrence
- The Merrymaid of Zennor (1999)
- I Had a Little Cat (2009) – an intervening version between those of the Collected Poems for Children, above

=== Plays and libretti ===
- Runaway (1936)
- The Conquering Hero (1937)
- Benedict (1938)
- How Pleasant to Know Mrs. Lear: A Victorian Comedy in One Act (1948)
- The Ballad of Aucassin and Nicolette (libretto, 1981)
- The Burning Boy (exact date of composition unknown, but probably in the mid-1980s)

=== As editor ===
- Peninsula (1957)
- Dawn and Dusk (1964)
- Modern Folk Ballads (1966)
- Rising Early (1972)
- The Puffin Book of Magic Verse (1974)
- The Puffin Book of Salt-Sea Verse (1978)
- The Batsford Book of Stories in Verse (1979)
- The Sun, Dancing: An Anthology of Christian Verse (1984)

=== As translator (some in limited editions) ===
- Twenty-Five Poems by Hamdija Demirovic (1980), translated with the author from the original Yugoslavian
- Schondilie (1982), from the original German by an anonymous author
- Kings' Children (1986), taken from German folk ballads
