= Village of Idiots =

- Directed by: Eugene Fedorenko; Rose Newlove
- Written by: John Lazarus
- Produced by: John Spotton; John Taylor; Dennis Murphy; Gerry Flahive; Barrie Angus McLean; David Verrall
- Narrated by: Nicholas Rice
- Distributed by: National Film Board of Canada
- Release date: 1999
- Running time: 13 minutes
- Country: Canada
- Language: English

Village of Idiots is a Canadian short animated comedy based on the classic humorous Jewish folk tales about the Wise Men of Chełm, directed and animated by Eugene Fedorenko and Rose Newlove, written by John Lazarus, and produced by the National Film Board of Canada (NFB). Fedorenko is the Academy Award-winning animator of the 1979 NFB short Every Child. In 1999, it was one of four films in the 1st Annual Animation Show of Shows.

== Summary ==
“Outsiders call Chełm the village of idiots," Shmendrick explains, "but our rabbi said we were a city of natural geniuses, with our own way of figuring things out.”

With muted, mesmerizing illustrations and heavy accordion-based music, the film follows Shmendrick as he sets out on a journey away from home for the first time. But along his journey from Chełm to Warsaw, He decides to have a rest. He then eats some food that he brought with him and then has a sleep. Afterwards, Shmendrick awakens and continues his journey. But as he travels, he comes upon a city that is eerily similar to the one he left behind. The rest of us might think Shmendrik just took a wrong turn and ended up back home, but for Shmendrik, this discovery sheds light on holy teachings: “the Talmud tells us that the world is everywhere the same," he recalls.

The above turn of the plot is a retelling of the short story by Isaac Bashevis Singer When Shlemiel Went to Warsaw.

== Awards ==
- 1999: CINANIMA International Animated Film Festival, Espinho, Portugal: RTP Internacional, Jury Honorable Mention, Special Jury Award, Audience Award
- 1999: Vancouver International Film Festival, Vancouver: Best Animated Film
- 1999: Montreal World Film Festival, Montreal: FIPRESCI Award from the International Federation of Film Critics, Second Prize in Short Films category
- 1999: Writers Guild of Canada: Best Script, to John Lazarus
- Castelli Animati, Genzano di Roma, Italy: Grand Prize, 2000
- Curtas Vila do Conde International Film Festival, Vila do Conde, Portugal: Grand Prize for Animation, 2000
- International Jewish Video Competition of the Judah L. Magnes Museum, Berkeley, California: First Prize, Animation, 2000
- Hiroshima International Animation Festival, Hiroshima, Japan: Renzo Kinoshita Award, 2000
- Palm Springs International Festival of Short Films, Palm Springs, California: Second Place, Animation, 2000
- Animafest Zagreb, Zagreb, Croatia: Second Prize, 2000
- Message to Man International Film Festival, St. Petersburg, Russia – Centaur Award for Best Animation, 2000
- Annecy International Animation Film Festival, Annecy, France: Special Jury Award, 2000
- Brisbane International Film Festival, Brisbane, Australia: Special Jury Award, 2000
- Melbourne International Animation Festival, Melbourne: Award for Best of International Session 6, 2001
- California SUN International Animation Festival, Los Angeles: Silver Star Award for Best Experimental Animation, 2001
- 21st Genie Awards, Toronto – Genie Award for Best Animated Short, 2001
- New York International Children's Film Festival, New York: Grand Prize Audience Award, 2002
