= Eric Kimmel =

American writer (born 1946)

Eric A. Kimmel
- Born: 1946 (age 79–80)
- Occupations: Author, professor
- Notable work: Hershel and the Hanukkah Goblins

Eric A. Kimmel (born 1946) is an American author of more than 150 children's books. His works include Caldecott Honor Book Hershel and the Hanukkah Goblins (illustrated by Trina Schart Hyman), Sydney Taylor Book Award winners The Chanukkah Guest and Gershon's Monster, and Simon and the Bear: A Hanukkah Tale.

Kimmel was born in Brooklyn, New York and earned a bachelor's degree in English literature from Lafayette College in 1967, a master's degree from New York University, and a PhD in Education from the University of Illinois in 1973. He taught at Indiana University at South Bend, and at Portland State University, where he is Professor Emeritus of Education.

Kimmel lives with his wife, Doris, in Portland, Oregon.

== Awards ==
- 2004: National Jewish Book Award for Wonders and Miracles: A Passover Companion
- 2008: National Jewish Book Award in the Illustrated Children's Book category for The Mysterious Guests: A Sukkot Story. Illustration by Katya Krenina
- 2011: National Jewish Book Award in the Illustrated Children's Book category for The Golem's Latkes Illustration by Aaron Jasinski
- 2013: National Jewish Book Award in the Illustrated Children's Book category for Hanukkah Bear Illustration by Mike Wohnoutka
- 2024: Regina Medal from the Catholic Library Association

== Bibliography ==
- Hershel and the Hanukkah Goblins (1989), written by Eric Kimmel, illustrated by Trina Schart Hyman
- Iron John (1994), written by Eric Kimmel, illustrated by Trina Schart Hyman
- The Adventures of Hershel of Ostropol (1995), written by Eric Kimmel, illustrated by Trina Schart Hyman
