= Kathryn Lasky =

American children's writer (born 1944)

- Born: June 24, 1944 (age 82); Indianapolis, Indiana, U.S.
- Education: University of Michigan
- Spouse: Christopher Knight
- Writing career
- Pen name: E. L. Swann
- Notable awards: Anne V. Zarrow Award for Young Readers' Literature; National Jewish Book Award; Newbery Honor
- Website: kathrynlasky.com

Kathryn Lasky (born June 24, 1944) is an American children's writer who also writes for adults under the names Kathryn Lasky Knight and E. L. Swann. Her children's books include several Dear America books, The Royal Diaries books, Sugaring Time, The Night Journey, Wolves of the Beyond, and the Guardians of Ga'Hoole series. Her awards include Anne V. Zarrow Award for Young Readers' Literature, National Jewish Book Award, and Newbery Honor.

== Biography ==
Kathryn Lasky grew up in Indianapolis. She is Jewish and of Russian descent. She is married to Christopher Knight, with whom she lives in Cambridge, Massachusetts and Deer Isle, Maine. She received a bachelor's degree in English from the University of Michigan and a master's degree in early childhood education from Wheelock College.

She was the 2011 winner of the Anne V. Zarrow Award for Young Readers' Literature.

She is the author of over one hundred books. Her most notable book series is Guardians of Ga’Hoole, which has more than 8 millions copies printed. Her books have been translated into 19 languages around the world.

Her adult nonfiction work includes the 2011 book, Silk and Venom: Searching for a Dangerous Spider, a biography of the arachnologist Greta Binford, and the 2017 bestseller Night Witches, the story of Soviet women pilots of the 588th Night Bomber Regiment in WWII.

== Works ==
=== Camp Princess ===
- Born To Rule
- Unicorns? Get Real!

=== The Royal Diaries ===
- Elizabeth I: Red Rose of the House of Tudor (England 1544)
- Marie Antoinette: Princess of Versailles (Austria-France 1769)
- Mary, Queen of Scots: Queen Without a Country (France 1553)
- Jahanara: Princess of Princesses (India, 1627)
- Kazunomiya: Prisoner of Heaven (Japan 1858)

=== Dear America ===
- A Journey to the New World: The Diary of Remember Patience Whipple, Mayflower, 1620
- Dreams in the Golden Country: The Diary of Zipporah Feldman a Jewish Immigrant Girl, New York City, 1903
- Christmas After All: The Great Depression Diary of Minnie Swift, Indianapolis, Indiana, 1932
- A Time for Courage: The Suffragette Diary of Kathleen Bowen, Washington, D.C., 1917
- Blazing West: The Journal of Augustus Pelletier, Lewis and Clark Expedition, 1804

=== My America ===
- Hope In My Heart: Sofia's Immigrant Diary (also known as Hope In My Heart, Sofia's Ellis Island Diary)
- Home at Last: Sofia's Immigrant Diary
- An American Spring: Sofia's Immigrant Diary

=== Daughters of the Sea ===
- Hannah
- May
- Lucy
- The Crossing

=== Horses of the Dawn ===
1. The Escape (2014)
2. Star Rise (2014)
3. Wild Blood (2016)

=== Starbuck Family Adventures ===
- Double Trouble Squared
- Shadows in the Water
- A Voice in the Wind

=== Guardians of Ga'Hoole ===
1. The Capture (also published as a movie tie-in edition in the UK as Legend of the Guardians)
2. The Journey
3. The Rescue
4. The Siege
5. The Shattering
6. The Burning
7. The Hatchling
8. The Outcast
9. The First Collier
10. The Coming of Hoole
11. To Be a King
12. The Golden Tree
13. The River of Wind
14. Exile
15. The War of the Ember
- The Rise of a Legend (2013) (this is a prequel to the Guardians of Ga'Hoole series about Ezylryb)

Two guide books were released to give readers more insight into the world of Hoole. They are narrated by the owl Otulissa.

- A Guide Book to the Great Tree (2007)
- Lost Tales of Ga'Hoole (2010)

=== Wolves Of The Beyond ===
- Lone Wolf
- Shadow Wolf
- Watch Wolf
- Frost Wolf
- Spirit Wolf
- Star Wolf

=== The Deadlies ===
- Felix Takes the Stage
- Spiders on the Case

=== Bears of the Ice ===
- Quest of the Cubs
- The Den of Forever Frost
- The Keepers of the Keys

=== Portraits ===
- Dancing Through Fire (2005)

=== Standalone titles ===
- Night Witches (2017)
- The Last Girls of Pompeii (2007)
- Blood Secret (2004)
- Broken Song (2005) (companion to The Night Journey)
- Star Split (1999) (Published in German as 3038: Staat der Klone)
- Alice Rose and Sam (1998)
- True North (1996)
- Beyond the Burning Time (1994)
- Memoirs of a Bookbat (1994)
- The Bone Wars (1988)
- Pageant (1986)
- Beyond the Divide (1983)
- The Night Journey (1981) (1982 winner of the National Jewish Book Award for Children's Literature)
- Prank (1984)
- Robin Hood: The Boy Who Became a Legend (1999)
- Hawksmaid: The Untold Story of Robin Hood and Maid Marian (2000)
- Ashes (2010)
- Chasing Orion (2007)
- Home Free (1985)

=== Children and YA non-fiction ===
- John Muir: America's First Environmentalist
- Interrupted Journey: Saving Endangered Sea Turtles
- Silk and Venom: Searching for a Dangerous Spider (2011) Candlewick. ISBN 978-0-7636-4222-8
- Shadows in the Dawn: The Lemurs of Madagascar
- The Most Beautiful Roof in the World
- Sugaring Time (1983 Newbery Honor)
- Days of the Dead
- Searching for Laura Ingalls
- Monarchs
- Surtsey: The Newest Place on Earth
- Dinosaur Dig
- Traces of Life: The Origins of Humankind
- A Baby map
- "Tangled in Time: The Portal" (2019)
- "Tangled in Time: The Burning Queen" (2019)

=== Picture books ===
- Lunch Bunnies
- Show and Tell Bunnies
- Science Fair Bunnies
- Tumble Bunnies
- Lucille's Snowsuit
- Lucille Camps In
- Starring Lucille
- Pirate Bob
- Humphrey, Albert, and the Flying Machine
- Before I was Your Mother
- The Man Who Made Time Travel
- A Voice of Her Own: The Story of Phillis Wheatley, Slave Poet
- Love That Baby
- Mommy's Hands
- Porkenstein
- Born in the Breezes: The Voyages Of Joshua Slocum
- Vision of Beauty
- First Painter
- The Emperor's Old Clothes
- Sophie and Rose. Illustrated by Wendy Anderson Halperin. Candlewick Press, 1998.
- Marven of the Great North Woods (1997 winner of the National Jewish Book Award for Children's Picture Books illustrated by Kevin Hawkes. January 2013 selection by the PJ Library.)
- A Brilliant Streak: The Making of Mark Twain
- Hercules: The Man, The Myth, The Hero
- The Librarian Who Measured the Earth
- She's Wearing a Dead Bird on Her Head!
- The Gates of the Wind
- Pond Year
- Cloud Eyes
- I Have an Aunt on Marlborough Street
- Sea Swan
- My Island Grandma

=== Adult ===
Other than Night Gardening all Lasky's works for adult readers are under the name Kathryn Lasky Knight.

- Atlantic Circle (1985) (Memoir about Lasky and her husband, Chris Knight, covering their childhood years on to a trip shortly their getting married sailing a thirty-foot ketch from Maine to Europe and back.)
- The Widow of Oz (1989)
- Night Gardening (1999) (written under the pseudonym of E.L. Swann)

==== Calista Jacobs mystery ====
This series for adult readers was also written under the name Kathryn Lasky Knight.

- Trace Elements (1986)
- Mortal Words (1990)
- Mumbo Jumbo (1991)
- Dark Swan (1994)
