= Fool (stock character) =

Stock character in creative works

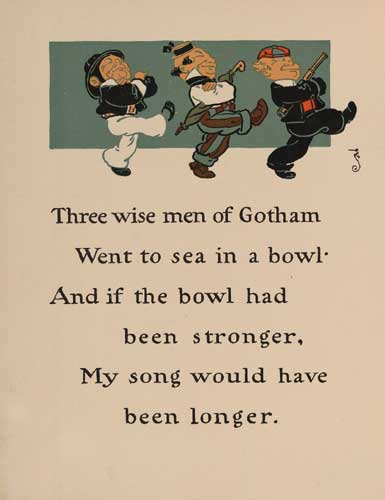
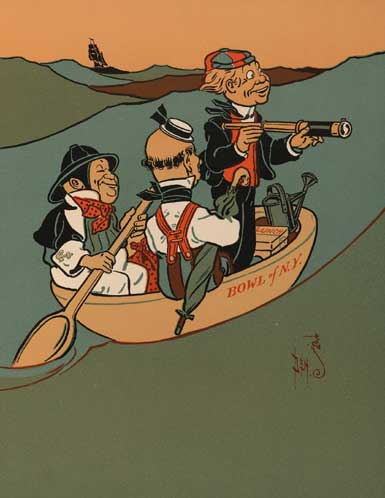
William Wallace Denslow's illustrations for Three Wise Men of Gotham, from a 1901 edition of Mother Goose

The fool is a stock character in creative works (literature, film, etc.) and folklore. There are several distinct, although overlapping, categories of fool: simpleton fool, wise fool, and serendipitous fool.

The six volume Motif-Index of Folk-Literature contains (in volume four) a group of motifs under the category "Fools (and other unwise persons)".

== Silly fool ==
A silly, stupid, simpleton, luckless fool is a butt of numerous jokes and tales all over the world.

Sometimes the foolishness is ascribed to a whole place, as exemplified by the Wise Men of Gotham. The localizing of fools is common to most countries, and there are many other reputed imbecile centres in England besides Gotham. Thus there are the people of Coggeshall, Essex, the "carles" of Austwick, Yorkshire, the "gowks" of Gordon, Berwickshire, and for many centuries the charge of folly has been made against silly Suffolk and Norfolk (Descriptio Norfolciensium about twelfth century, printed in Wright's Early Mysteries and other Latin Poems).

In Germany there are the "Schildbürger", from the fictitious town of "Schilda"; in the Netherlands, the people of Kampen; in Bohemia, the people of Kocourkov; and in Moravia the people of Šimperk. There are also the Swedish Täljetokar from Södertälje and Kälkborgare from Kälkestad, and the Danish tell tales of the foolish inhabitants of the Molboland. In Latin America, the people of Galicia are the butt of many jokes. In Spain, the people of Lepe, a town in Andalusia, follow a similar fate. Among the ancient Greeks, Boeotia was the home of fools; among the Thracians, Abdera; among the ancient Jews, Nazareth; among modern Jews, Chełm; among the ancient Asiatics, Phrygia.

=== Subcategories ===
In Jewish folklore, Schlemiel and Schlimazl are two popular subtypes of a fool. The following saying helps to tell them apart: a schlemiel is a man who spills hot soup on a schlimazl: the first one is clueless, while the second one is luckless.

Numbskull/noodlehead stories are about well-meaning folks who take advice too literally to their own grievance or who find the most complicated solution to the most simple problem. However, sometimes they may end with luck ("serendipitous fool"). These can vary from an absent-minded professor (a stock character in itself) to Jack from Jack and the Beanstalk who exchanged a cow for a bean. In that, numbskull stories overlap with trickster stories, where a numbskull is often a "mark" (victim) for a trickster.

Sichuan opera makes extensive use of the fool archetype, particularly in comparison to other forms of Chinese opera. Fool characters appear in guises including Mangpao (the emperor's attendant), the fool in mandarin's clothes, the playboy fool, the dirty and disheveled fool, the old-fashioned fool, and the thief fool. The thief fool is one of the most popular character archetypes in Sichuan opera.

== Wise and clever fools ==
German jester depicted at Altes Rathaus ln München

Many tales are based on the idea that a simple nature of a fool is a guise of wisdom, or even the wisdom itself.

On the other hand, the mask of a fool may be used to utter wise but unpleasant truths. Some classify jesters into two categories: "natural fools" (people who lacked social awareness and could occasionally utter the truth simply being unaware of social conventions) and "licensed fools" (often picked to be jester for their physical handicap, and telling the truth was simply part of their "job description").

In addition to jesters, naturally stupid people gave rise to other categories of respected fools, such as holy fool, e.g., yurodivy in Russian tradition, avadhuta in some Indian religions, and other manifestations of "crazy wisdom" in various cultures.

== Serendipitous fool ==
In scenarios of this kind a simpleton, a laughing stock in the end wins big, usually a princess or a kingdom, or wealth, or all the above. Brothers Grimm have three tales of a lucky simpleton. In The Queen Bee, The Three Languages and The Three Feathers, the fool gets help from animals. The luck of the Russian folk character Ivan the Fool comes from his simplicity.

== Heroes, villains and fools ==
While some characters are archetypal fools, at the same time, the coordinates "hero/villain/fool may be seen as major measures of any character. Sometimes these traits mix or boundaries are blurred."

== Archetypal foolish persons ==
- Ivan the Fool of Russian folklore
- Hloupý Honza, Czech
- Shakespearean fool

== Archetypal foolish groups ==
- Town of fools trope
  - Hölmöläiset
  - Molboers
  - Schildbürger
  - Wise Men of Chelm
  - Wise men of Gotham
- Keystone Cops, incompetent policemen featured in slapstick comedies

=== Racist and other discriminative joke series ===
- Blonde jokes
- Sardarji jokes
- Polish jokes
- East Frisian jokes

== See also ==
- Blason populaire
- Shakespearean fool
- Feigned madness
- Fool's literature
- Foolishness for Christ
- Idiot savant
- Švejk, a merry simpleton who often outwits the better ones.
- Guru Paramartha, a foolish fictional Buddhist monk
- Hans Dumm, "Dumb Hans", a Brothers Grimm fairytale, see "Hans Dumm" in Wikisource
