= Simpleton =

Cliche in folklore

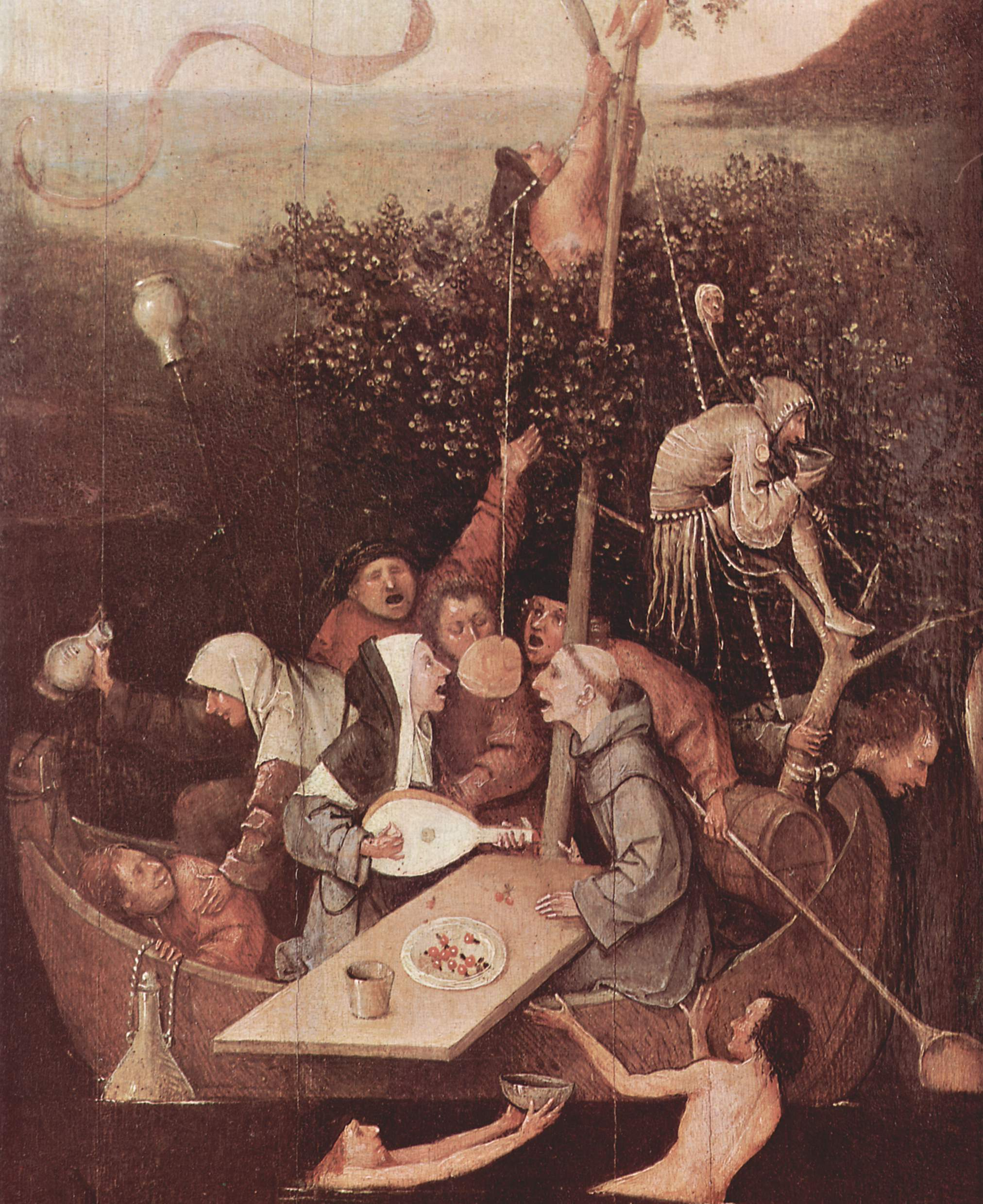
The Ship of Fools by Hieronymus Bosch, between 1488 and 1510.

In folklore, a simpleton is a person whose foolish actions are the subject of often-repeated stories. Simpletons are also known as noodles or fools. Folklore often holds, with no basis in fact, that certain towns or countries are thought to be home to large numbers of simpletons. The ancient Greeks told tales of stupid populations in Abdera and other cities; in Germany, burgher of Schilda are conspicuous in these stories; in Spain hundreds of jokes exist about the supposed foolishness of the people from Lepe; and in the United Kingdom, the village of Gotham in England is reputed to be populated by simpletons. In Sri Lanka whole districts in the central, southern, and western provinces are credited with being the abode of foolish people.

Tales of simpleton behavior have often been collected into books, and early joke books include many simpleton jokes. In ancient Greece, Hierokles created such a collection. In the United Kingdom, the famous Joe Miller's Jests is highly inclusive of simpleton jokes. In Britain the Irish are often stereotyped as stupid and are the butt of An Englishman, an Irishman and a Scotsman jokes. Books of simpleton tales exist in Persia, Ireland, Turkey, Iceland, Japan, Sicily, and India.

Simpleton tales are huge in number, but many of them share the same notions of simple-minded behavior. Many are repeated, with altered names, settings, characters, etc., in language after language and collection after collection.

A very old such tale from the United Kingdom is:

There was a man of Gotham that rode to the market with two bushels of wheat, and because his horse should not be damaged by carrying too great a burden, he was determined to carry the corn himself upon his own neck, and still kept riding upon his horse till he arrived at the end of his journey. Now I will leave you to judge which was the wisest, his horse or himself.

A famous one from ancient Greece is:

A man's father having died, the son dutifully took the body to the embalmers. When he returned at the appointed time to take it, there happened to be a number of bodies in the same place, so he was asked if his father ′had′ any peculiarity by which his body might be recognised, and the simpleton replied, "He had a cough."

The shortened form simp is also a derogatory term with a long history.

== See also ==
- Fool (stock character)
- Fools of Chelm
- Jester
- Lightbulb joke
- Molbo story
- Polish joke
- Wise Men of Gotham
- Guru Paramartha
- The Lazy Boy (fairy tales)
