= When Shlemiel Went to Warsaw and Other Stories =

Children's short story collection

When Shlemiel Went to Warsaw and Other Stories is a 1968 book of children's short stories by Isaac Bashevis Singer, illustrated by Margot Zemach, translated by the author and Elizabeth Shub. It was a 1969 Newbery Honor book, Singer's third consecutive Newbery Honor (1967, 1968). The book contains eight stories.

== Contents ==
In the preface Singer wrote that some of the stories mother told him, while the stories about Tsirtsur and Peziza, Rabbi Leib, and Menaseh are his own.

"Shrewd Todie and Lyzer the Miser" ("Todie the Wise and Leyzer the Miser" [Todye der hokhem un Leyzer der karger])

Todie borrows a silver spoon from Lyzer and returns two, claiming that the spoon gave birth. The greedy Lyzer accepts the explanation and takes both spoons. Todie repeats that several times and eventually borrows nine expensive silver candlesticks. Next day he says the candlesticks died. Lyzer finds this unbelievable and brings Todie before the rabby for judgement, but the rabby dismisses the complaint, because Lyzer put himself in the predicament by himself, by accepting the first unbelievable claim.

"Tsirtsur and Peziza" (original 1967 title: A mayse vegn shretelekh un grilen["A Story about Elves and Crickets"])

It is a story about the unusual friendship of a cricket and an "orphan imp". Both lived behind the stove. "Tsirtsur" is for the sound a cricket makes and "Pesiza" is a female name derived from the adjective "quick". Eventually they both had found their couples and the four of them lived behind the stove happily ever after.

"Rabbi Leib and the Witch Cunegunde" (Yiddish title: R. Leyb Sore's un di makhsheyfe Kunegunde [ (Sarah's Son Reb Leyb and the Witch Kunegunde)], Jewish Daily Forward, 1967);

Both the rabbi and the witch lived in the same forest and both were miracle workers, with the difference that the former used the divine powers, while the latter resorted to the powers of devil, and for years they waged a silent war against each other. Eventually Cunegunde started admiring the rabbi, who was always stronger, and decided to force him to marry her, and then carry out a revenge. She resorted to the help of the devil, but Rabbi Leib outwitted her again.

"The Elders of Chelm and Genendel's Key" ("Why Did She Give Me the Key?" [Farvos hot zi mir gegebn dem shlisl?])

This is a story from the cycle about the Wise Men of Chelm. The shortage of milk threatens the Chelmers to deprive them of sour cream for holiday blintzes, and the Elders headed by Gronam the Ox (known from the 1966 book The Fools of Chelm and Their History) declare for water to be called sour cream and vice versa. However, while there was plenty of "sour cream" now, the Chelmers started complaining about the shortage of "water". But that was "an entirely new problem, to be solved after the holidays". The key in the title is the key for the strongbox his wife Genendel is supposed to give to him as a secret signal that he said something unwise.

"Shlemiel, the Businessman" ("Shlemiel's Business" [Shlumiel's mis'herim])

Yet another story about Chelm. The failure of Shlemiel's first enterprize is basically the same as in The Bewitched Tailor (1901) by Sholem Aleichem: Shlemiel buys a she-goat to start milk business, but midway an innkeeper switches the she-goat with a he-goat. When Shlemiel goes back to the seller to complain about the wrong goat, the innkeeper switches the goats back...

"Utzel and His Daughter Poverty"

"Menaseh's Dream" (Yiddih title: Der palats ["The Palace"], 1967)

"When Shlemiel Went to Warsaw" ( (Ven Shlemiel iz gegangen keyn Varshe)

This is a story from the cycle about the Wise Men of Chelm. Shlemiel sets off to Warsaw. Midway he prepares for a night's sleep by the roadside, takes off his shoes, and points them towards Warsaw, in order to remember which direction to go. A passer-by turns the shoes around, and the unsispecting Shlemiel arrives to the town that strikingly resembles his native Chelm...
