= Numskulls cannot find their own legs =

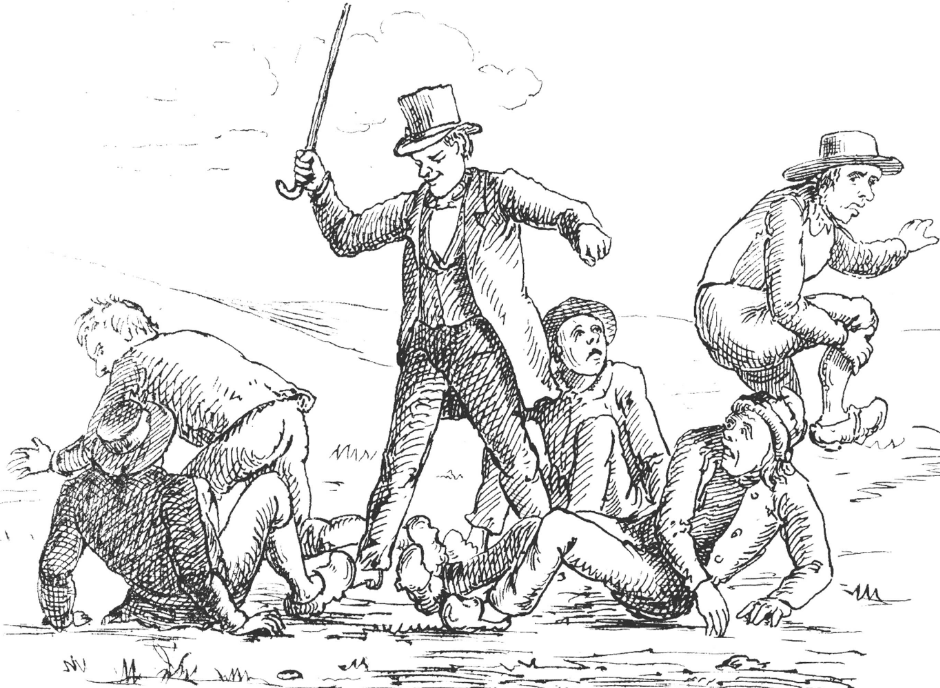
Molbos' mixed leg sorting

"Numskulls Cannot Find Their Own Legs" is a category of stories about fools known in several cultures. The name is from the Aarne–Thompson–Uther Index, ATU 1288. It is also classified as AT 1288 "Fools Cannot Find Their Own Legs" and in Motif-Index of Folk-Literature: J2021. "Numskulls cannot find their own legs". A typical plot goes as follows. A bunch of people after sitting together cannot stand up and go because they no longer know which leg belongs to whom. A passer-by sorts this out by beating them with a stick.

The Molbo story version may be found here. It, together with several other Molbo stories, is also part of the 1898 the operetta "Molboerne" (The People of Mols) by composer Olfert Jespersen and lyricist Herman Petersen.

The version for children by Isaac Bashevis Singer, "The Mixed-Up Feet and the Silly Bridegroom", is about four daughters of a family in the town of fools, Chelm, who slept in a common bed and could not get out because of their feet mixed. The town elder recalled that such thing had happened before and the long stick helped that time. To prevent this from repeating, he also advised to marry the girls off, so that each will have her own bed.

The Book of Noodles by W. A. Clouston mentions two such stories and compares it with that of "self-counting" (Note: Counting story: A group of numskulls try to count themselves, but each of them forgets to count himself, until a stranger counts them, for a hefty fee, with a whip.):

A story akin to that of the Gothamite fishers, if not, indeed, an older form of it, is told in Iceland of the "Three Brothers of Bakki", who came upon one of the hot springs which abound in that volcanic island, and taking off their boots and stockings, put their feet into the water and began to bathe them. When they would rise up, they were perplexed to know each his own feet, and so they sat disconsolate, until a wayfarer chanced to pass by, to whom they told their case, when he soon relieved their minds by striking the feet of each, for which important service they gave him many thanks. This story reappears, slightly modified, in Campbell's Popular Tales of the West Highlands: A party of masons, engaged in building a dyke, take shelter during a heavy shower, and when it has passed, they continue sitting, because their legs had got mixed together, and none knew his own, until they were put right by a traveller with a big stick.

It is also the subject of the tale "How the Twelve Clever Brothers Got Their Feet Mixed Up," in The Twelve Clever Brothers and Other Fools: Folktales from Russia by Mirra Ginsburg (1979).
