= Shlemiel the First =

Shlemiel the First can refer to:

- A play by Isaac Bashevis Singer based on When Shlemiel Went to Warsaw and some other short stories from his Chelm cycle
- Shlemiel the First (musical), a musical theatre adaptation of Singer's play
