= Fünsing =

Fictional German "village of fools"

Fünsing is a fictional German "village of fools". The 19th-century Deutsches Wörterbuch by the Brothers Grimm defines the word Fünsinger as a silly person, a simpleton whose actions provoke laughter; Latin: baburnus, stultus, and compares the word with "Schildbürger".

Making fun of peasants was common in 16th-century German drama, drawing a contrast between smart and well-mannered city dwellers and stupid and clumsy peasants.

Fünsing is best known from two Schwanks by the 16th-century German poet and playwright Hans Sachs: "Der Roßdieb zu Fünsing" ("A Horse Thief from Fünsing") and "Die Fünsinger Bauern" ("Peasants of Fünsing") (1558).

In the first one, one of Sachs' best-known pieces, the caught horse thief defends himself by arguing that he is no more dishonest than the judges, who, he asserts, would do the same if they had the opportunity. The judges let him go after he promises to come back after the harvest to be hanged.

The second one tells of the stupidity of the Fünsinger in verse. One of the tales goes as follows:

One day a bunch of Fünsinger went to the forest to collect acorns for the swine. A branch onto which a farmer clung broke, so he fell down, but his head got caught in the branches and was torn off. Others found him under the tree without a head and started wondering whether he had a head at all. They asked his wife, who answered that on Saturday when she washed him, he still had his head on, but she didn't remember if he still had it on Sunday.

There is a Molbo story similar to that of "Die Fünsinger Bauern".
