= Paramartha (disambiguation) =

Paramartha is a concept in Buddhism.

Paramartha may also refer to:

- Paramartha (Chinese monk)
- Guru Paramartha, fictional monk in Tamili humor
- Paramartha Sangeet, a collection of devotional songs in Bengal music
