= Goldenes Posthorn =

- Native name: Werner Behringer GmbH
- Industry: Restaurant
- Founded: 1498
- Headquarters: Glöckleinsgasse 2, 90403 Nuremberg, Germany
- Key people: Kai Behringer
- Website: goldenes-posthorn.de

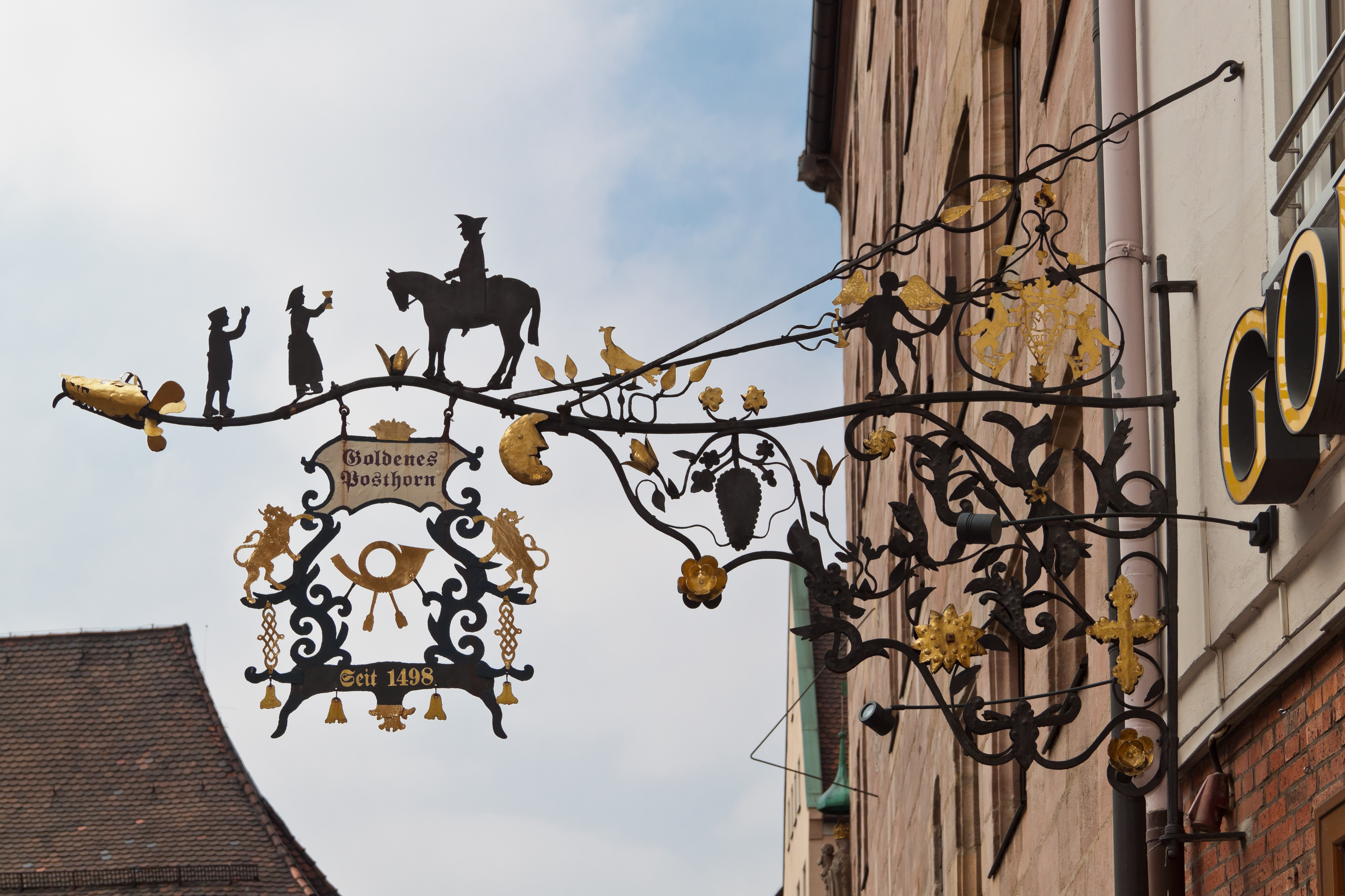
Goldenes Posthorn sign

Goldenes Posthorn is one of the oldest wine shops in Germany. It was founded in 1498 in the historic center of Nuremberg.

During history it was visited by many famous people including Albrecht Dürer, Hans Sachs, and Richard Wagner.

== See also ==
- List of oldest companies
