= Kocourkov Teachers =

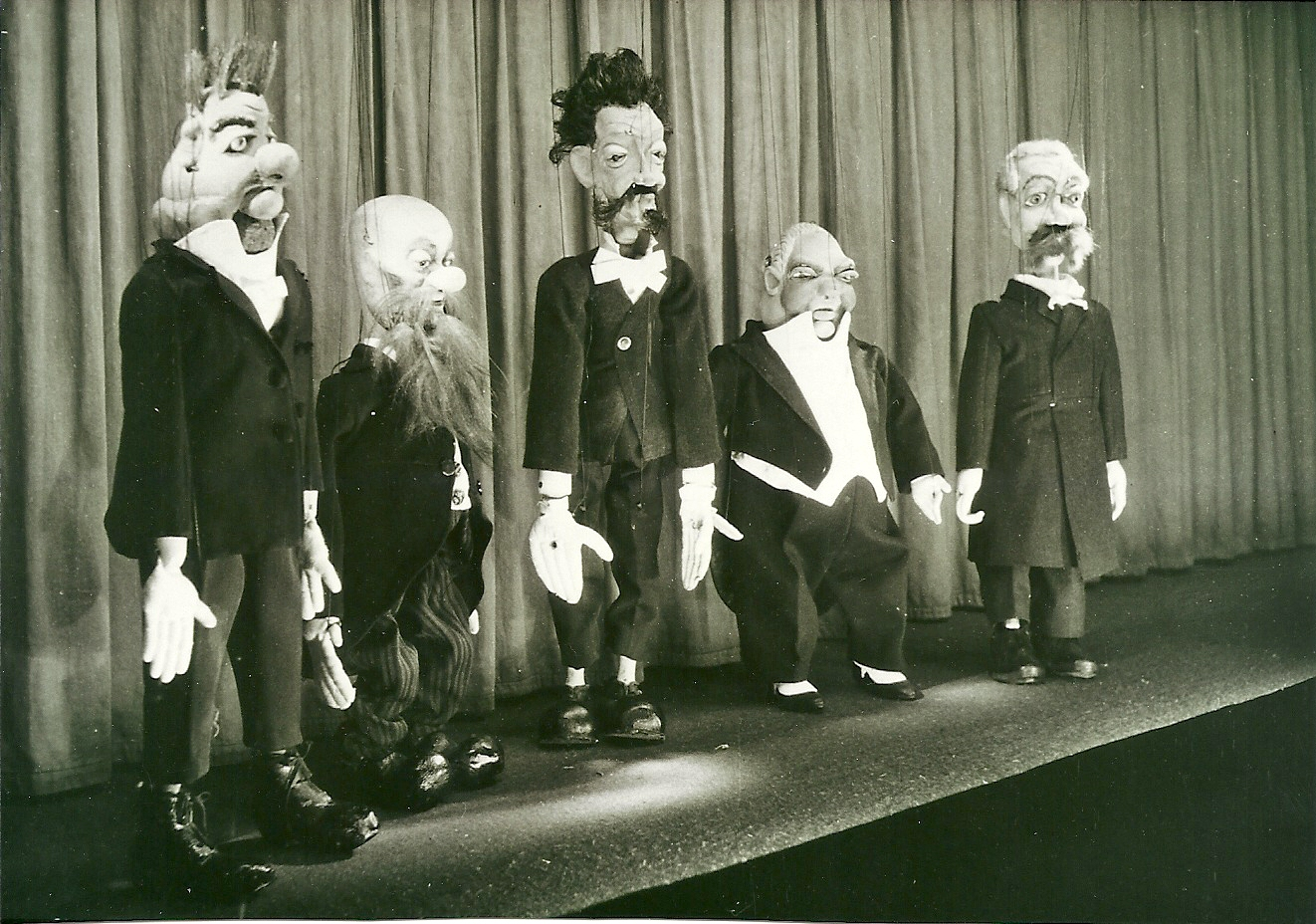
"Kocourkov Teachers 50 years after" by puppeteer Jan Vavřík-Rýz

The Singers' Association of Kocourkov Teachers or the Kocourkov Teachers (Czech: Pěvecké sdružení učitelů kocourkovských (PSUK), Kocourkovští učitelé) were a Czech parody all-men's vocal group active during 1914–1959, with intermittent breaks, which enjoyed high popularity both in interwar Czechoslovakia and the Czechoslovak Socialist Republic, despite being frowned upon by the communist powers in the latter. The name was a parody of the names of some teachers' singing groups, such as the Singers’ Association of Moravian Teachers, and Kocourkov is a fictional Czech "town of fools". Despite the name, nobody (with a brief exception) was a teacher. The name of the town derives form the word kocour, ("tomcat"); therefore they were informally referred to as Kocouři ("Tomcats"), and cats were featured on their posters.

== History ==
The singing group was formed in 1914 by gymnasium students from Rychnov nad Kněžnou for fun and they did some performing for a while, until World War I broke out. After the war, they got together again and managed to be listed in the programme of the famous cabaret Červená sedma in Prague. At the audition, nine "Kocourkov teachers" presented their act Balada na Váhu, a paraphrase of the work of Vítězslav Novák; however, Novák's version was a serenade about the Slovak river Váh, while the "teachers" sung about váha decimálka (decimal balance). They also performed at some other venues. The composition of the members varied throughout the years. After the demise of the cabaret due to lack of interest, the group broke up again, but in 1926, they resumed performing, lasting until the 1940s. After World War II, they continued to work together until 1954. The height of their career was between 1931 and 1949. During that time, they played in four films and recorded over forty songs. In 1947, they were among those invited to a film festival in London. Their last official performance was in 1949, after which they mostly performed at various smaller events such as weddings, birthdays, etc. After 1953, i.e., with the fall of Stalinism, they were allowed to present their program in various places in Bohemia and Moravia. Their very last performance was in Dobruška in September 1959.

Throughout all this time, they were amateur singers and had other regular professions.

== Discography ==
- 1955: Kocourkovský kongres duchů, Supraphon
- 1979: Kocourkovští učitelé, Supraphon

== Filmography ==
- 1931 Kariéra Pavla Čamrdy
- 1934 U nás v Kocourkově
- 1940 The Catacombs
- 1941 Z českých mlýnů

== Other ==
In 1939, they published a book about themselves, Kocourkovští učitelé se zpovídají aneb Chudí hoši, kteří se proslavili.
