= The Real Shlemiel =

1995 film

The Real Shlemiel (Aaron's Magic Village)
- Directed by: Albert Hanan Kaminski
- Written by: Galia Benousilio; Albert Hanan Kaminski
- Based on: The Fools of Chelm and Their History by Isaac Bashevis Singer
- Produced by: Dora Benousilio; Peter Völkle; Gilbert Hus
- Starring: Tommy J. Michaels; Tovah Feldshuh; Harry Goz; Steve Newman
- Narrated by: Fyvush Finkel
- Music by: Michel Legrand
- Production companies: Les Films de L'Arlequin; TMO Films; Project Images Films; Videovox Studio; C2A
- Distributed by: Beaufilm GmbH (Germany); Cinema Public Films (France)
- Release date: October 13, 1995 (Germany)
- Running time: 78 minutes
- Countries: France; Germany; Hungary; Israel
- Language: English

The Real Shlemiel, also Aaron's Magic Village, (Note: German title: Die Schelme von Schelm (The Rascals of Schelm); French: Le monde est un grand Chelm (The World is a Big Chelm) and Aaron et le livre des merveilles (Aaron and the Book of Wonders); Hebrew: הרפתקאות שלומיאל (Shlemiel's Adventures).) is a 1995 German-French-Hungarian adventure-fantasy film. It was released in Germany in 1995 and in the United States in 1997. The film is based on Stories for Children by Isaac Bashevis Singer.

== Plot ==
After creating the world, God has three cherubs spread intelligence, wisdom, and foolishness over the world. The third cherub accidentally drops all the foolishness on the village of Chelm, so that everyone in Chelm is very dumb.

A recently orphaned boy named Aaron moves to Chelm to live with his uncle Shlemiel, while Darko, an evil sorcerer, plans to create a golem to destroy Chelm, (Note: Cf. with "real" Golem of Chełm.) but needs the Book of Marvels (Note: The Book of Marvels is a hint to Zohar.) to bring the golem to life.

Shlemiel's family is poor so he asks the rabbi, Gronam, (Note: Aaron, the Lantuch, Gronam the Great, and Zlateh the Goat are characters from Singer's tales.) for a raise. Gronam instead tells him to marry off his three daughters, which will make him rich, while Shlemiel's wife, Sarah, tells Aaron to sell his goat, Zlateh, who cannot make milk. Darko's fox listens in on Shlemiel's plan to marry off his daughters, so Darko poses as a female matchmaker and offers three nonexistent rich husbands to Shlemiel in exchange for the Book of Marvels. When Shlemiel refuses, Darko reveals his true identity and angrily causes a blizzard.

While Aaron and Zlateh take shelter from the storm inside a haystack, an imp called the Lantuch is blown inside, hitting Aaron in the head and getting mild amnesia, causing him to forget his spells. When he tries to use a spell to find the biscuits Aaron lost, it instead gives Zlateh the ability to make milk, causing his family to keep her when he returns.

Shlemiel informs Gronam that a sorcerer is after the Book of Marvels, and Gronam entrusts the Book to Shlemiel. Darko instructs his fox to spy on Shlemiel and inform him where he hides the Book of Marvels. Shlemiel hides it in the cupboard that Gronam originally took it from, and hides the key in his shoe. When Shlemiel falls asleep on his way to Warsaw to find husbands for his daughters, he points his shoes in the direction of Warsaw to remember which way to go when he wakes up. The fox steals the key from his shoe, and mischievously points the shoes back toward Chelm. After receiving the key, Darko steals the Book of Marvels.

Falling for the fox's trick, Shlemiel goes back the way he came, and when he arrives back at Chelm, he thinks that it is a second version of the village. Everyone but Aaron believes this as well. Darko returns to his castle, brings the golem to life, and orders it to destroy Chelm. The golem destroys all the buildings in Chelm except the synagogue because it is sacred, much to the sorcerer's anger.

Gronam says that if the golem lives past the Sabbath, it will live forever, and the world will be destroyed. Because the way to kill a golem is written in the Book of Marvels, Aaron goes to Darko's castle with Zlateh and the Lantuch to find the Book. As Aaron reads the information he needs, confirming that what Gronam said was true, the Lantuch accidentally alerts Darko while casting a spell. Darko takes the Book of Marvels back, but Zlateh attacks him, causing the Book to fall into the fire. As Aaron, Zlateh, and the Lantuch escape the castle, Darko sends the golem after them, but the golem has a change of heart due to Aaron's courage and refuses to harm him, even protecting him from Darko's attack. The Lantuch is hit on the head by a rock, regains his memory, and turns Darko to stone. Though reluctant to kill the golem after his latest action, Aaron does so by erasing a symbol on his head to save the world.

With Chelm destroyed, all its inhabitants leave to find new homes somewhere else, with Shlemiel and his family intending to go to "Chelm #1".

== Cast ==
Character	German voice actor	English voice actor
Aaron	Manuel Straube	Tommy J. Michaels
Uncle Shlemiel	Michael Rüth	Ronn Carroll
Zlateh the Goat	Sybille Nicolai	Tovah Feldshuh
Darko the Sorcerer	Willi Röbke; Lisa Kreuzer (The Matchmaker)	Steven Newman; Tovah Feldshuh (The Matchmaker)
The Lantuch	Katrin Fröhlich	Ivy Austin
Gronam Ox	Donald Arthur	Harry Goz
Aunt Sarah	Anita Höfer	Tovah Feldshuh
Sendel the Shoemaker	Alwin Joachim Meyer; Peter Bischoff (singing)	Lee Wilkof
Treitel the Tailor	Roland Astor; Gotti Gottschalk (singing)	Chip Zien
Schmendrick the Carpenter	Imo Heite; Fritz Graas (singing)	Larry Keith
Lekish	Hans Rainer Müller; Wolly Emperhoff (singing)	Lewis J. Stadlen
Tudras	Gert Wiedenhofen	Lee Wilkof
Zeinvel the Baker	Imo Heite	Lewis J. Stadlen
The Donkey	Frank Lenart	Chip Zien
The Peddler	Martin Umbach; Peter Bischoff (singing)	Lewis J. Stadlen
Dana	Angela Wiederhut; Jane Bogaert (singing)	Laura Dean
Dina	Mara Winzer	Margery Gray Harnick
Dona	Alisa Palmer; Ulli Essmann (singing)	Julia K. Murney
