= Underdog =

Competitor who is expected to lose

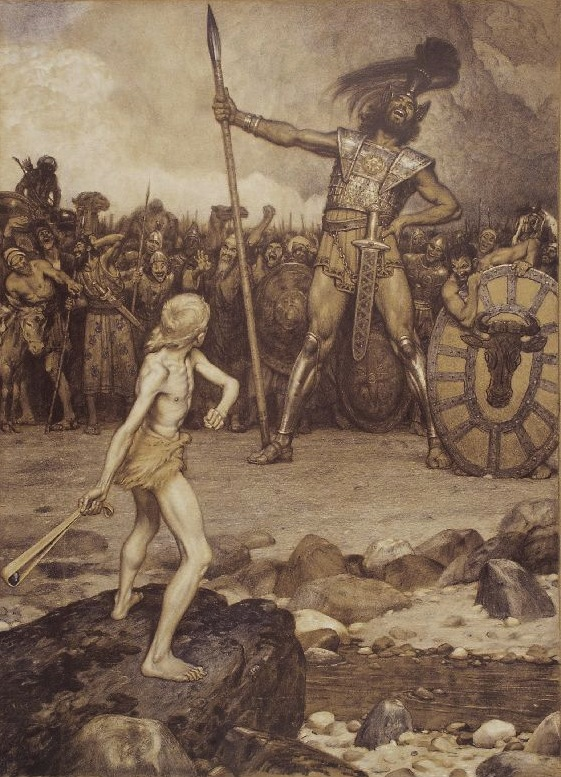
In the battle between David and Goliath, David is an archetypal example of an underdog.

An underdog is a person or group participating in a competition, usually sports and creative works, who is largely expected to lose. The party, team, or individual expected to win is called the favorite or top dog. In the case where an underdog wins, the outcome is an upset. An "underdog bet" is a bet on the underdog or outsider for which the odds are generally higher.

The first recorded uses of the term occurred in the second half of the 19th century; its first meaning was "the beaten dog in a fight".

In British and American culture, underdogs are highly regarded. This harkens back to core biblical stories, such as that of David and Goliath, and also ancient British legends such as Robin Hood and King Arthur. This is also reflected in the idea of the American dream, where someone from a low social class can achieve success through hard work. Sports are another instance where underdogs are highly valorized, reflected in both real events, such as the Miracle on Ice or the Maracanazo, and in popular culture depictions of sports. Spectators and commentators are commonly drawn to establishing one side as the underdog, even if both teams are considered evenly matched.

In a story, the Fool is often an underdog if they are the main character. Their apparent ineptitude leads to people underestimating their true abilities, and they are able to win either through luck or hidden wisdom against a more powerful, "establishment" villain. An example in film is The Tramp portrayed by Charlie Chaplin.

== Cinderella ==
In sports, the terms "Cinderella", "Cinderella story", and "Cinderella team" are used to refer to situations in which competitors achieve far greater success than reasonably expected. Cinderella stories tend to gain much media and fan attention as they move closer to the tournament final game.

The term comes from the well-known European folk tale of Cinderella, which embodies a myth-element of unjust oppression and triumphant reward, when the title character's life of poverty is suddenly changed to one of remarkable fortune. In a sporting context the term has been used since at least 1935 when James J. Braddock fought Max Baer for the world heavyweight championship and won. For this unlikely feat he was given the nickname "Cinderella Man" by Damon Runyon.. It came into widespread usage in 1950, when the Disney movie was released that year, and in reference to City College of New York, the unexpected winners of the NCAA Men's Basketball championship also that year. The term was used by Bill Murray in the 1980 movie Caddyshack where he pretends as the announcer to his own golf fantasy: "Cinderella story. Outta nowhere. A former greenskeeper, now, about to become the Masters champion." Referring somewhat inaccurately to the plot details of the classic Cinderella story, the media will debate whether the given "Cinderella" team or player will "turn into a pumpkin", i.e. fail to win the prize and then return to its former obscurity. In the fairy tale, it was the carriage that turned into a pumpkin at midnight, not Cinderella herself. Another popular term is "strike midnight", when a Cinderella team does finally get beaten.

Prior to the widespread use of "Cinderella" in this way, the more common term for unexpected and dramatic success was "Miracle", as in the "Miracle Braves" of 1914, the "Miracle on Grass" in 1950, the "Miracle of Coogan's Bluff" in 1951, the "Miracle Mets" of 1969, "Miracle on Ice" in 1980 and the "A Miracle at Bourbon Street" in 2014.

Cinderella teams are also referred to as a "surprise package" or "surprise packet", and their success would be termed a "fairy-tale run". A related concept is the giant-killer, which refers to a lesser competitor who defeats a favorite, reflecting the story of David and Goliath. In Soviet sports, particularly team sports like football and hockey, there appeared a term Thunder to the Dominant [teams] (Russian: Гроза авторитетов, Groza avtoritetov) that referred to underdog, often a strong mid-table team, of which the dominant teams were afraid. The title is still in use in the post-Soviet period and sometimes is given to "dark horse" teams which manage to win a major tournament. In the 1970s and 1980s, the Soviet sports weekly Sportivnaya Moskva introduced an official award for top football and hockey competitions, which was given to teams that managed to take away the highest number of points from the last season's top three teams.

== See also ==
- Dark horse
- Rags to riches
- Upset (competition)
