= Julius von Voss =

German writer

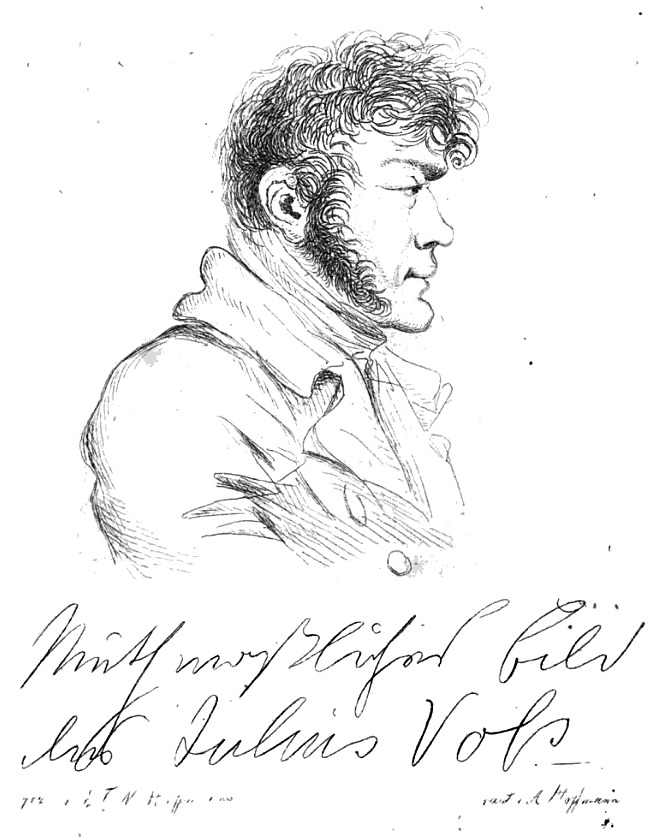
Julius von Voss, a drawing by E. T. A. Hoffmann

Julius von Voss, also Julius von Voß (24 August 1768, Brandenburg an der Havel, Prussia – 1 November 1832 Berlin) was a German writer.

== Work ==
His rapidity of literary production was almost without a parallel. He published about 160 works (plays, novels, and short stories) and a large number of works remained unpublished.

His best novel is Die Schildbürger (1823), a comical novel about Schildbürger, residents of Schilda, a fictional German town of fools (the text is available at Google Books). He wrote many comedies, farces, and satirical parodies. In The Strahlau Haul of Fish (1822, a popular piece with songs, in the Berlin patois) he gives the first example of the Berlinese farce. Ini. Ein Roman aus dem ein und zwanzigsten Jahrhundert (Ini. A novel from the 21st century, 1810) is regarded as the first German science fiction novel.

== Publications ==
- Geschichte eines bei Jena gefangnen preussischen Offiziers (1807)
- Ini. Ein Roman aus dem ein und zwanzigsten Jahrhundert ["Ini: A Novel from the Twenty First Century"] (1810), Reprint with commentary by Ulrich Blode: Oberhaid: Utopica, 2008, ISBN 978-3-938083-11-6
- Das Grab der Mutter in Palermo, novel (1818)
- Die Damenhüte im Theater (1820)
- Der Stralower Fischzug, play (1821)
- Die sechzehn Ahnen des Grafen von Luftheim, family chronicle (1821)
- Spanien's Jungfrauen-Tribut an die Mauren, novel (1830)

== See also ==
- German science fiction literature
