= Kocourkov =

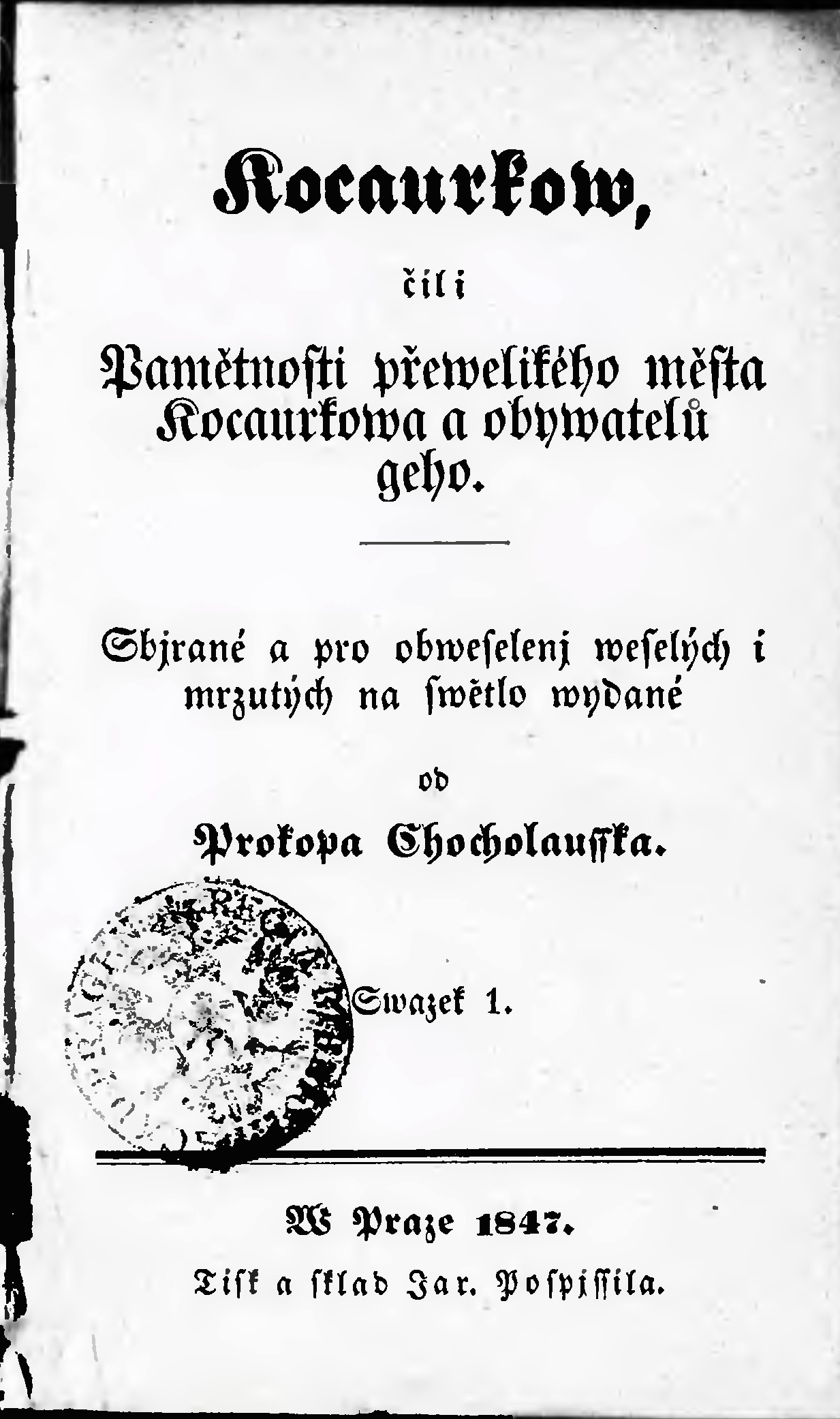
Prokop Chocholoušek, Kocaurkow (title page, 1847)

In Czech culture, Kocourkov is a fictional place, whose inhabitants are attributed with doing various stupid things, similar to stories about other towns of fools: how they sowed salt, how they dragged a bull to the church roof to graze the grass, etc.

== Kocourkov stories ==
The name of the town derives from the word kocour, "tomcat" in Czech, so it literally means "Tomcat's". Ethnographer Cecílie Havlíková terms the "town of fools" stories as "Kocourkov stories" and classifies them into three categories. Some of them are "classic" stories present in nearly the same form in nearly every European culture. Others are adapted to the realities of a particular culture and thus may change quite considerably. The third category are tales peculiar only to a certain country and often only to a certain locality. She lists several other Czech and Slovak locations of similar glory: Přelouč in Czech Republic, Šimperk in northern Moravia, Lhotky in Horňácko region, in western Slovakia it is Skalica and the fictional location of this type is known as Čudákova ("Oddball's").

Czech poet and journalist Josef Jaroslav Langer in his 1832 satirical allegory "A Day in Kocourkove" mentions that a Schwank (satirical verse) "Die Fünsinger Bauern" by German poet Hans Sachs was translated as "Kocourkovští sedláci", which dates the glory of Kocourkov to the 16th century at the latest.

=== Sample stories ===
Ondřej Sekora in his Chronicles of the Town of Kocourkov gave the following examples of the wisdom of Kocourkov.

The books record a case with an exemplary punishment of bird thieves - sparrows who brazenly stole grain. The chosen individual was executed by being thrown from the town hall tower; the execution was successful, not a feather was left of the sparrow.

Oblízal, a dweller of Kocourkov, sowed three bags of salt in the freshly plowed black soil behind the walls at the turn of April and May. Nettles did grow instead of salt, but Kocourkovites considered them to be unripe salt, and many of them had health problems when trying to taste it. The Kocourkov women then fed the "unripe salt" to their geese.

On an occasion of the opening of a new town hall, the musicians were ordered to play all over the city, but they had different repertoire, and produced what is now known as "Kocourkov music". (Note: "Cats's music" or "cat's concerto" is a common idiom for cacophony.)

== In modern culture ==
In 1934 a full-length comedy film U nás v Kocourkově was released in Czechoslovakia. An escaped convict gets off a train in Kocourkov, where he is mistaken for the son of a famous poacher Jalovec, and "Jalovec, Junior" is elected city mayor.....

Ondřej Sekora's 1947 children's book Chronicles of the Town of Kocourkov was republished several times.

In 1988 a radio show Kocourkov was recorded by Jana Dvořáková.

In 1959 Josef Hiršal and Jiří Kolář wrote a children's book Kocourkov, whose humorous stories were adapted from old German texts. In 1992 a TV comedy Kocourkov was released based on the book.

The alleged absurdities in politics of Czech Republics made various people to compare the country with Kocourkov.

== See also ==
- Kocourkov Teachers
