= Hamala =

Hamala may refer to:

- Hamala, Algeria
- Hamala, Bahrain

== See also ==
- Hämälä
