= Fastnachtspiel =

German sixteenth century prelenten play

A Fastnachtspiel (English "Shrovetide play"), plural Fastnachtspiele, was a type of play performed in what is now Germany on Shrove Tuesday (Fastnacht) during the sixteenth century as a part of pre-Lenten carnivals. Extant examples mostly originated from the city of Nuremberg (although they were performed widely) and Hans Sachs was considered the most prolific in this form. Though sometimes performed on stage, Fastnachtspiele were usually performed in a street or town square as a part of the carnival celebrations. Productions usually lacked props and only had simply scenery. Fastnachtspiele typically used existing stories from ancient or medieval works which were adapted to contemporary conditions. Playwrights such as Sachs took major inspiration from The Decameron of the 14th century and from earlier burlesque stories.

== List of works ==
Hans Sachs:

- Der fahrende Schüler im Paradies ("The travelling student in Paradise"), 1550
- Das Wildbad ("The bathing pool"), 1550
- Das heiss Eisen ("The hot iron"), 1551
- Der Bauer im Fegefeuer ("The farmer in Purgatory"), 1552
