= Stephen D. Newman =

American Actor

- Born: January 20, 1943 (age 82); Seattle, Washington, U.S.

Stephen D. Newman (born January 20, 1943) is an American actor. In 1983, he appeared opposite Brian Bedford in a Broadway production of Molière's The Misanthrope. For his performance in The Misanthrope, in which he played Philinte, Newman was nominated for a Drama Desk Award for Outstanding Featured Actor in a Play. From 1980-81, he played the role of Barrett Marshall on the NBC daytime drama Texas. Newman also appeared in the 1982 film Sophie's Choice.

== Filmography ==
Year	Title	Role	Notes
1967	Funnyman	Sculptor	
1976	The Next Man	Andy Hampsas	
1979	The Seduction of Joe Tynan	Congressman Wayne Tiller	
1982	Hanky Panky	Calder Aide	
1982	Sophie's Choice	Larry	
1995	The Real Shlemiel	Darko, the Sorcerer	Voice
