= Land of Fools =

Land of Fools or Country of Fools may refer to:

- A fabulous land from the Russian literary fairy tale The Golden Key, or The Adventures of Buratino and its adaptations
- The unnamed country called Land of Fools where the events of the novel The Final Circle of Paradise happen

== See also ==
- Town of fools
