= From the Czech Mills (1925 film) =

1925 film

- Directed by: Svatopluk Innemann; Ferry Seidl
- Written by: Václav Wasserman
- Based on: Z českých mlýnů by Karel Tůma
- Starring: Ferry Seidl; Filip Balek-Brodský
- Cinematography: Jaroslav Fischer; Svatopluk Innemann
- Release date: 13 November 1925
- Running time: 97 minutes
- Country: Czechoslovakia
- Language: Silent

From the Czech Mills (Czech: Z českých mlýnů) is a 1925 Czechoslovak comedy film directed by Svatopluk Innemann.

== Cast ==
- Ferry Seidl as Šebestián Šafránek
- Filip Balek-Brodský as Florián Karásek / Vodník
- Božena Svobodová as Mrs. Karásková
- Bohumil Kovář as Priest
- Zdena Kavková as Anička
- Jiří Plachý as Karel Karásek
- Vladimír Řepa as Tonda Kolenatý
- Antonín Frič as Old miller
- Luigi Hofman as Landowner
- Nora Ferry as Julinka, landowner's daughter
- Milka Balek-Brodská as Aunt Filomena
- Hugo Haas as Baron Zachariáš Zlámaný
- Kocourkov Teachers vocal group as members of the cyclists' association "Don't Get Married"
