= Facetia =

European literary genre from the Renaissance

Facetia (singular; plural: facetiae) is a European literary genre from the Renaissance consisting of short humorous stories, jokes, jests, witticisms or drollery, often obscene or coarse.

The first printed joke book is Facetiae (full title: Poggii Florentini Oratoris clarissimi facetiarum liber, English: A book of jokes by Poggius, the most famous Florentine orator) by Poggio Bracciolini, first published in 1470 and reprinted many times. Earlier manuscripts of this type are known, such as Libellus de facetiis Rudolfi regis ("A Little Book with Facetiae about King Rudolph") by a Strasbourg clergyman Albert of Strasbourg, which contained anecdotes about Rudolf I of Germany (erroneously attributed to a certain Albertus Argentinensis); however, Bracciolini's is the first printed joke book. Since then many other authors printed collections of facetiae, first, in Latin and later, in other European languages.

== Other notable collections ==
- Faceciae Polskie abo Żartowne a trefne powieście biesiadne ... teraz znowu poprawione i przydano (Polish Faceciae, Or...)
- Facetiae facetiarum, hoc est joco-seriorum fasciculus novus (Jokes of jokes, this is a new bundle of joke-serious jokes)
  - It contains a number of facetious parodies of scientific and philosophical treatises: Delineatio Summorum Capitum Lustitudinis studenticae In Nonnullis Academiis ufitata (A delineation of the main points of student debauchery, as practiced in some academies), p. 1. Discursus Methodicus de Peditu, eiusque speciebus, crepitu & visio, in Theses digestus (A methodical discourse of the foot, its species, noises and appearance, compiled into a Thesis), p. 17. Disputatio Feudalis de cucurbitatione (A feudal disputation on cuckoldry), p. 43. Disputatio Inauguralis, Theoretico-Practica, de Ivre Potandi (An inaugural disputation, theoretical and practical, on the law of drinking), p. 55. Nobile scabiei encomiun (In praise of the noble itch), p. 101. Bonus mulier sive Centuria Iuridica Practica Quaestionum illustrium: de Mulieribus vel uxoribus (A good woman, or, a century of practical legal questions of an illustrious nature: about women or wives), p. 139. Iucunda de osculis Dissertatio historica, philologica (The joy of kisses, a historical and philosophical dissertation), p. 185. Theses inaugurales de Virginibus (An inaugural thesis on Virgins), p. 251. Disputatio de Iure et Natura pennalium (A disputation on the law and nature of pens), p. 303. De multisciis studiosis et magistris (On multi skilled students and teachers), p. 333. Theses de cochleatione (Theses on cochleation), p. 379. De Hanreitate, p. 445. Theses de hasione et hasibili qualitate (Theses on Hasion and the Hasible quality), p. 511. Floia, cortum versicalem (Fleas, a short verse), p. 531. Disputatio de Cornelio et eiudem natura Ac Propietate (A disputation on Cornelius, his nature and properties) p. 539. De Beanis (On beani), (Note: beani was a medieval Latin term for new students) p. 559.

== See also ==
- Schwank, short satirical tale, verse or play, in German literature
- Fabliau
- Polish absurd literature
- Ribald comedy
