= Hans Sachs =

German meistersinger ("mastersinger"), poet, playwright and shoemaker

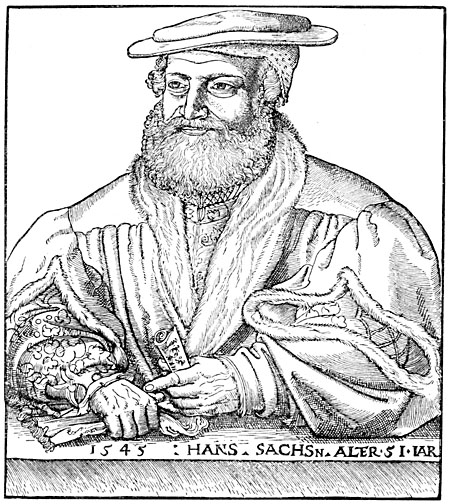
Hans Sachs, wood engraving by Michael Ostendorfer

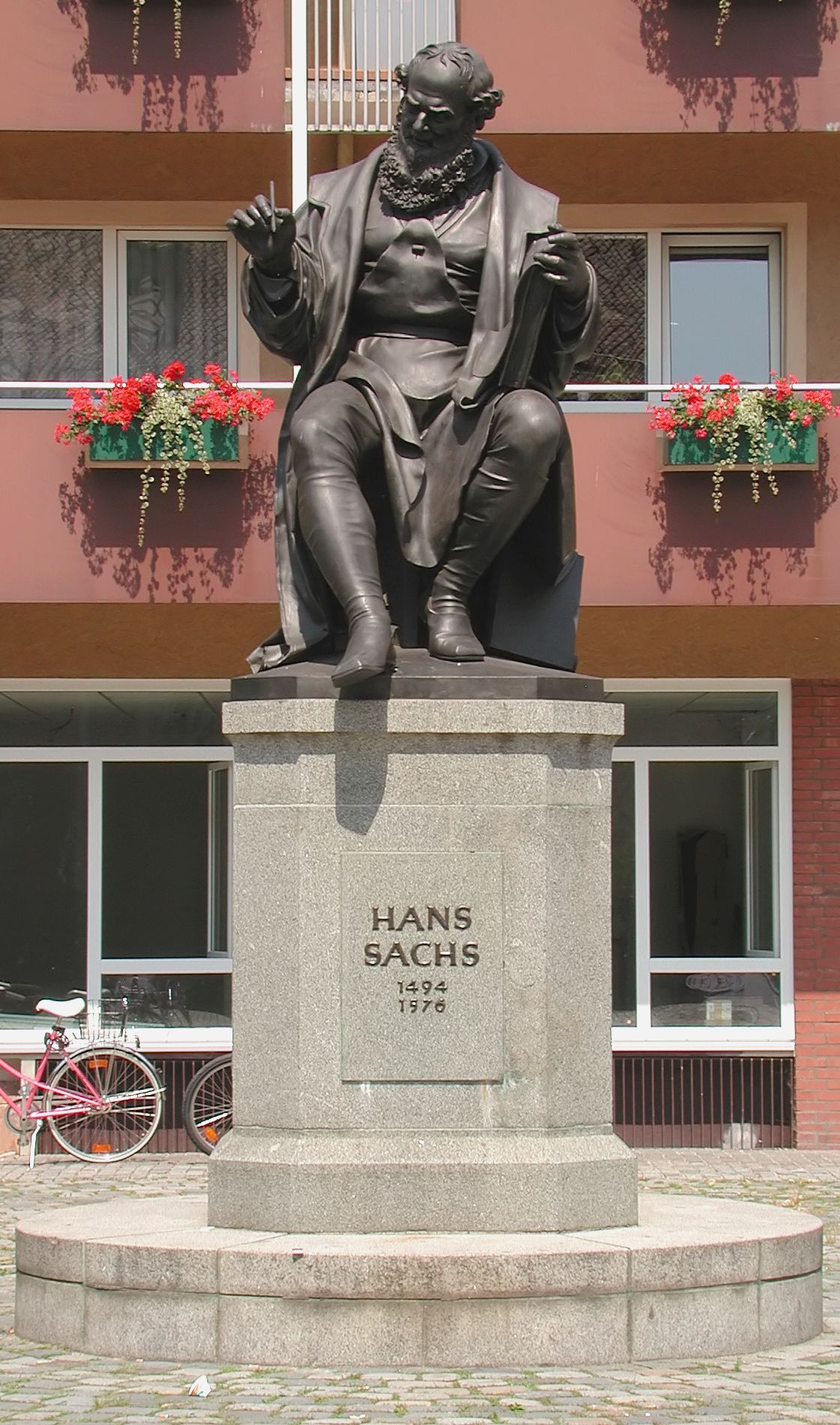
Hans Sachs memorial Nuremberg by Johann Konrad Krausser

Hans Sachs (5 November 1494 – 19 January 1576) was a German Meistersinger ("mastersinger"), poet, playwright, and shoemaker.

== Biography ==
Hans Sachs was born in the Free Imperial City of Nuremberg (German: Nürnberg), Holy Roman Empire. As a child he attended a singing school that was held in the church of Nuremberg. This helped to awaken in him a taste for poetry and music. His father was a tailor. He attended Latin school (German: Lateinschule) in Nuremberg. When he was 14 he took up an apprenticeship as a shoemaker.

After the apprenticeship, at age 17, he set out on his Wanderjahre or Walz as a Wandering journeyman, travelling about with companions and students. Over several years he worked at his craft in many towns, including Regensburg, Passau, Salzburg, Munich, Osnabrück, Lübeck, and Leipzig.

In 1513 he reached the small town of Wels, where he remained for a time, devoting himself to the cultivation of the fine arts. The Emperor Maximilian I chanced to pass through this town with his dazzling retinue, and the young poet allowed himself to be carried away by the splendour of the court. The prince placed him in the halls of the palace of Innsbruck. Later Hans Sachs quit the court and went to Schatz and Munich.

In the same year, he took up a kind of apprenticeship to become a mastersinger at Munich. Lienhard Nunnenbeck, a linen weaver, was his master. In 1516 he settled in Nuremberg and stayed there for the rest of his life. On 1 September 1519 he married Kunigunde Creutzer (1502–1560). He had seven children, but all died while he was still alive. He married again on 2 September 1561, this time to the young widow Barbara Harscher.

The great event of his intellectual life was the coming of the Reformation; he became an ardent adherent of Luther, and in 1523 wrote in Luther's honor the poem beginning "The nightingale of Wittenberg, which is heard everywhere" (German: Die wittenbergisch Nachtigall, Die man jetzt höret überall), and four remarkable dialogues in prose, in which his warm sympathy with the reformer was tempered by counsels of moderation. In spite of this, his advocacy of the new faith earned him a reproof from the town council of Nuremberg, and he was forbidden to publish any more "pamphlets or rhymes" (German: Büchlein oder Reimen). It was not long, however, before the council itself openly threw in its lot with the Reformation.

== Works ==
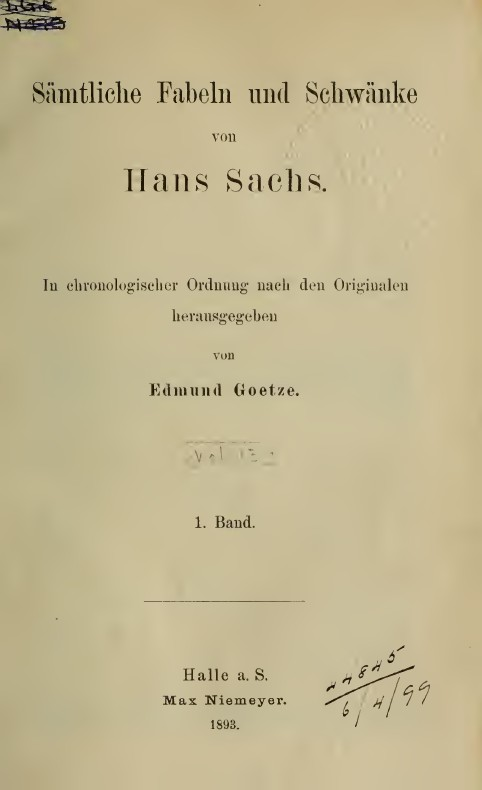
Sämtliche Fabeln und Schwänke. 1 (1893)

He wrote over 6000 pieces of various kinds. Exact numbers vary widely in secondary literature, mainly because it is not always clear if a piece is an independent work or part of a larger work. Also, certain works may be put in different categories by different authors. His productivity is especially remarkable because he kept working as a shoemaker throughout his life. (As far as is known, the Mastersingers did not as a common practice write or sing for money.) His works include

- Mastersongs (German: Meisterlieder) proper (about 4200)
- other poems and songs
- Carnival plays
- Tragedies
- Comedies
- Prose dialogues
- Fables
- Religious tracts, including “A wonderful prophecy of the papacy about how things will go for it up until the end of the world” (German: Eyn wunderliche Weyssagung von dem Babsttumb, wie es ihm biz an das endt der welt gehen sol) in collaboration with Andreas Osiander (1527).

Sachs wrote about Fünsing, a fictional "village of fools", known from two of his Schwanks: "Der Roßdieb zu Fünsing" ("A Horse Thief from Fünsing") and "Die Fünsinger Bauern" ("Peasants of Fünsing"). (1558)

In the first one, one of the best known pieces of Sachs, the caught horse thief defends himself by arguing that he is no more dishonest than the judges, who, he asserts would do the same, had they had an opportunity. The judges let him go after he promises to come back after the harvest to be hanged.

The second one tells of various stupidity of Fünsinger in verse.

== Assessment ==
His mastersongs were not published, being intended solely for the use of the Nuremberg Meistersinger school, of which Sachs was the leading spirit. His fame rests mainly on the "spoken poems" (German: Spruchgedichte) which include his dramatic writings. His "tragedies" and "comedies" are, however, little more than stories told in dialogue, and are divided by convenient pauses into a varying number of acts. Sachs had little idea of the essentials of dramatic construction or the nature of dramatic action.

The subjects are drawn from the most varied sources, but particularly the Bible, the classics and the Italian novelists. He succeeds best in the short anecdotal Fastnachtsspiel or Shrovetide play, where characterisation and humorous situation are of more importance than dramatic form or construction.

Some of his farces have been played on the modern stage. Among these are:

- Der fahrende Schüler im Paradies (1550)
- Das Wildbad (1550)
- Das heiss Eisen (1551)
- Der Bauer im Fegefeuer (1552)

== As a fictional character ==
Hans Sachs is the subject of an opera (1840) by Albert Lortzing. He is a leading character in Richard Wagner's opera Die Meistersinger von Nürnberg (1868).
