= Hymylä =

In Finnish folklore, Hymylä (variants: Himola, Huikkola, Hyvölä, Hytölä, Hämälä, Hölmölä) is a mysterious place for the banishment of a child who failed in a children's game, usually, the game of riddles.

With a chant, e.g., "Hyys, hyys, Hymylään! kun et sitäkään tiedä" ("Off, off, to Hymylä! You don't know anything!") a failed child is banished somewhere outside the children's circle, e.g., outdoors, if the game is indoors. Upon return the child is demanded to tell a story about his trip. Most commonly the story describes some kind of ridiculous, topsy-turvy world. People there stir porridge with an axe and chop firewood with a ladle, etc. Sometimes a trip to Hymylä involves some kind of forfeit: some silly work, trifle money, or suffering. A trip to Hymylä is perceived as a kind of disgrace.

The earliest account of the tradition was reported by Cristfried Ganander in his Aenigmata Fennica ("Finnish Riddles") in 1783.

Over time, places with these names were perceived akin to Gotham, the Three Wise Men were from, a settlement of proverbial fools.

== See also ==
Hölmölä, a Finnish town of fools
