= Motif-Index of Folk-Literature =

Six volume catalogue of folklore motifs used by folklorists, composed by Stith Thompson

The Motif-Index of Folk-Literature is a six volume catalogue of motifs, granular elements of folklore, composed by American folklorist Stith Thompson (1932–1936, revised and expanded 1955–1958). Often referred to as Thompson's motif-index, the catalogue has been extensively used in folklore studies, where folklorists commonly use it in tandem with the Aarne–Thompson–Uther Index (ATU), an index used for folktale type analysis.

The motif-index and the ATU indices are regarded as standard tools in the study of folklore. For example, folklorist Mary Beth Stein said that, "Together with Thompson's six-volume Motif-Index of Folk-Literature, with which it is cross-indexed, The Types of Folktale constitutes the most important reference work and research tool for comparative folk-tale analysis.” Alan Dundes, who was an outspoken critic, also said substantially the same thing, without confining the application to comparative studies: "[the indices] constitute two of the most valuable tools in the professional folklorist's arsenal of aids for analysis".

Concise outlines of both indices appear in Thompson's The Folktale (1946).

== Terminology ==
In the context of the index, Thompson has defined motif as follows: "A motif is the smallest element in a tale having a power to persist in tradition. In order to have this power it must have something unusual and striking about it".

But in the Motif-index itself, Thompson had also provided a more "cautious" definition: "[a]nything that goes to make up a traditional narrative ... When the term motif is employed, it is always in a very loose sense, and is made to include any of the elements of narrative structure".

This use of the noun motif is specialized to the field of folklore studies. According to the Oxford English Dictionary, folkloristic use of the noun motif is not summed up in the definition for literary criticism ("Motif", def. 3a), but deserves its own separate sense of this definition ("Motif", def. 3b). Similarly, the compound noun motif index is used in cultural anthropology to denote "an index of standard motifs, esp. those found in folk tales".

== System ==
Thompson discusses composing the Motif-Index of Folk-Literature in his autobiography, A Folklorist's Progress: Reflection of a Scholar's Life. In producing the motif-index, Thompson built upon the research of Finnish folklorist Antti Aarne, who in 1910 published an index of European tale-types. Thompson himself had revised this in 1928 to cover the region from Europe to Asia: this is known as the Aarne-Thompson tale type index. In his Motif-Index, Thompson then compiled, classified, and numbered the traditional motifs of the mostly European folktale types in the tale-type index.

Thompson's motif-index organizes thousands of motifs. Entries are first organized by an umbrella topic (for example, category S is "Unnatural Cruelty"). Entries are then divided into more specific subcategories. For example, entry S50 "Cruel relatives-in-law" contains the sub-entry S51.1 "Cruel mother-in-law plans death of daughter-in-law". Thompson's The Folktale includes the following overview of the motif-index:

- A. Mythological motifs
  - A0–A99 Creator
    - A21 Creator from above
      - A21.1 Male and female creators
  - A100–A499 Gods
    - A116 Twin gods
      - A116.1 Twin gods – one mortal, other immortal
    - A210 Sky god
  - A500–A599 Demigods and culture heroes
    - A515 Pair of culture heroes
      - A515.1 Culture hero brothers
        - A515.1.1.1 Twin culture heroes sired by two fathers
  - A600–A899 Cosmogony and cosmology
    - A716.1 Four suns at first: culture hero shoots three down
    - A751 Man in the Moon
      - A751.2 Man in the Moon a rabbit (or other animal)
    - A773 Origin of the Pleiades
    - A812 Earth Diver
  - A900–A999 Topological
  - A1000–A1099 World calamities
  - A1100–A1199 Establishment of natural order
    - A1115.2 Why the Sea is Salt: magic salt mill
  - A1200–A1699 Creation and ordering of human life
    - A1411 Theft of light
    - A1415 Theft of fire
  - A1700–A1799 Creation of animal life
  - A2200–A2599 Animal characteristics
  - A2600–A2699 Origins of trees and plants
- B. Animals
  - B0–B99 Mythical animals
    - B32 Phoenix
  - B100–B199 Magic animals
    - B100–B119 Treasure animals
    - B120–B169 Animals with magic wisdom
    - B170–B199 Other magic animals
  - B200–B299 Animals with human traits
    - B215.1 Bird language
  - B300–B599 Friendly animals
    - B300–B349 Helpful animals―general
    - B350–B399 Grateful Animals
    - B400–B499 Kinds of helpful animals
    - B500–B599 Services of helpful animals
      - B582.1.1 Animal wins wife for his master (Puss in Boots).
    - B600–B699 Marriage of person to animal
      - B640 Marriage to person in animal form
      - B650 Marriage to animal in human form
    - B700–B799 Fanciful traits of animals
- C. Taboo
  - C0–C99 Taboo connected with supernatural beings
  - C100–C199 Sex taboo
  - C200–C299 Eating and drinking taboo
  - C300–C399 Looking taboo
  - C400–C499 Speaking taboo
  - C900–C999 Punishment for breaking taboo
    - C961.1 Transformation to pillar of salt for breaking taboo
- D. Magic
  - D0–D699 Transformation
    - D10–D99 Transformation of man to different man
    - D100–D199 Transformation: man to animal
      - D113.1.1 Werewolf
    - D200–D299 Transformation: man to object
    - D300–D399 Transformation: animals to person
      - D361.1 Swan maiden
    - D400–D499 Other forms of transformation
    - D450–D499 Transformation: object to object
    - D500–D599 Means of transformation
    - D600–D699 Miscellaneous transformation incidents
  - D700–D799 Repeated transformation
    - D732 Loathly lady
    - D735.1 Beauty and the beast: disenchantment by kiss
  - D800–D1699 Magic objects
    - D800–D899 Ownership of magic objects
    - D900–D1299 Kinds of magic objects
      - D990–D1029 Magic bodily members
      - D1070 Magic ornaments
        - D1076 Magic ring
      - D1080 Magic weapons
      - D1081 Magic swords
        - D1081.1 Sword of magic origin
      - D1470 Magic object as provider
        - D1470.1.46 Magic hammer
    - D1520 Magic object affords miraculous transportation
      - D1521.1 Seven-league boots
    - D1550 Magic object miraculously opens and closes
      - D1552.2 Mountain opens to magic formula (Open sesame)
    - D1600–D1699 Characteristics of magic objects
  - D1700–2199 Magic powers and manifestations
    - D1710–D1799 Manifestations of magic power
      - D1711 Magician
      - D1719 Possession of magic powers — miscellaneous
        - D1719.5 Magic power of a fairy
        - D1719.6 Magic power of a Holy Cross
      - D1720 Acquisition of magic powers
      - D1740 Loss of magic powers
      - D1761 Magic results produced by wishing
  - D1800–D2199 Possession and means of employment of magic
    - D1800–D1949 Lasting magic qualities
      - D1830 Magic strength
      - D1831 Magic strength resides in hair
    - D1950–D2049 Magic characteristics
      - D1960 Magic sleep
        - D1960.2 Kyffhäuser or king asleep in mountain
        - D2003 Forgotten fiancée
    - D2050–D2099 Destructive magic powers
    - D2100–D2199 Other manifestations of magic power
      - D2100 Magic wealth
- E. The dead
  - E0–E199 Resuscitation
  - E200–E599 Ghosts and other revenants
    - E215 The Dead Rider (Lenore)
    - E251 Vampire
    - E341 The grateful dead
    - E491 Procession of the dead
    - E501 Wild Hunt
  - E600–E699 Reincarnation
  - E700–E799 The soul
- F. Marvels
  - F0–F199 Otherworldly journeys
  - F200–F699 Marvelous creatures
    - F535.1 Thumbling
  - F700–F899 Extraordinary places and things
- G. Ogres (and Satan)
  - G10–G399 Kinds of ogres
    - G20 Ghouls; persons eat corpses
    - G84 Fee-fi-fo-fum
  - G100–G199 Giant ogres
  - G200–G299 Witches
    - G264 La Belle Dame sans Merci
  - G300–G399 Other ogres
  - G400–G499 Falling into ogre's power
  - G500–G599 Ogre defeated
- H. Tests
  - H0–H199 Identity tests: recognition
    - H41.1 Princess on the pea
  - H300–H499 Marriage tests
  - H500–H899 Tests of cleverness
  - H900–H1199 Tests of prowess: Tasks
  - H1200–H1399 Tests of prowess: Quests
    - H1337 Quest for sword of light
- J. The wise and the foolish
  - J0–J199 Acquisition and possession of wisdom/knowledge
  - J200–J1099 Wise and unwise conduct
  - J1100–J1699 Cleverness
    - J1185.1 Scheherazade: story with indefinite sequels told to stave off execution
  - J1700–J2799 Fools (and other unwise persons)
    - J1703 Town (country) of fools
    - J2021 Numskulls cannot find their own legs
    - J2100 Remedies worse than the disease (examples in Molbo story and Wise Men of Chelm)
- K. Deceptions
  - K0–K99 Contests won by deception
  - K100–K299 Deceptive bargains
    - K112.2 "Soup stone" sold
  - K300–K499 Thefts and Cheats
    - K301 Master thief
    - K445 The emperor's new clothes
  - K500–K699 Escape by deception
  - K700–K799 Capture by deception
  - K800–K999 Fatal deception
  - K1000–K1199 Deception into self-injury
  - K1200–K1299 Deception into humiliating position
  - K1300–K1399 Seduction or deceptive marriage
  - K1400–K1499 Dupe's property destroyed
  - K1400–K1599 Deceptions connected with adultery
  - K1600–K1699 Deceiver falls into own trap
  - K1700–K1799 Deception through bluffing
  - K1800–K1899 Deceptions by disguise or illusion
  - K1900–K1999 Impostures
  - K2100–K2199 False accusations
    - K2110.1 Calumniated wife
    - K2111 Potiphar's wife
- L. Reversal of fortune
- M. Ordaining the future
  - M223 Rash promise
- N. Chance and fate
  - N411.1 Whittington's cat
- P. Society
- Q. Rewards and punishment
- R. Captives and fugitives
- S. Unnatural Cruelty
- T. Sex
  - T80 Tragic love
    - T83 Hero and Leander
- U. The nature of life
- V. Religion
- W. Traits of character
- X. Humor
- Z. Miscellaneous groups of motifs

== Relation to tale-type index ==
The idea has been expressed that a combined set of motifs (in the motif-index) may constitute a folktale narrative (cf. the description of the Motif-Index as "a huge catalogue of folk narrative elements that may variously combine to form whole folk narratives" by Jan Harold Brunvand).

This idea had already been anticipated by Alexander Veselovsky who wrote that a "cluster of motifs" constituted a "plot", influencing Russian formalists like Vladimir Propp, whose study prefigured Thompson's Motif-Index, as has been pointed out.

In the book The Folktale, Thompson invokes this phrase "cluster of motifs" in several passages, as here, in connection with tales involving the dead helper: (Note: The grateful dead (E341).)

The chain of circumstances by which this helper joins the hero and certain details of his later experience are so uniform and well articulated as to form an easily recognizable motif, or rather cluster of motifs. This fact has caused some confusion to scholars who have not sufficiently distinguished between such a motif and the entire tale of which it forms only an important part.

But in this instance, Thompson is warning that the motif cluster is rather "only a framework for the adventures of the hero", containing "at least three different tales within".

Thompson also explains that a single motif may be found in numerous folktales "from all parts of the earth" (383).

== Editions (print and digitised) ==
=== Print editions ===
- Stith Thompson, Motif-Index of Folk-Literature: A Classification of Narrative Elements in Folk-Tales, Ballads, Myths, Fables, Mediaeval Romances, Exempla, Fabliaux, Jest-Books, and Local Legends, FF Communications, 106–109, 116–117, 6 vols (Helsinki: Suomalainen Tiedeakatemia/Academia Scientiarum Fennica, 1932–36)/Indiana University Studies, 96–97, 100–101, 105–106, 108–112, 6 vols (Bloomington, Ind, 1932–1936).
- Stith Thompson, Motif-Index of Folk-Literature: A Classification of Narrative Elements in Folk-Tales, Ballads, Myths, Fables, Mediaeval Romances, Exempla, Fabliaux, Jest-Books, and Local Legends, rev. and enl. edn, 6 vols (Copenhagen: Rosenkilde and Bagger, 1955–58).

=== Digitisations of the second edition (book format) ===
- Reissued on CD-ROM Bloomington: Indiana University Press, 1993.

== Other motif indices ==
Many folklorists have produced extensive motif and tale-type indices for culture areas not covered by Thompson, or covered only to a limited extent. For surveys, see

- Azzolina, David S. 1987. Tale type- and motif-indexes: An annotated bibliography. New York, London: Garland.
- Uther, Hans-Jörg (1996). "Type- and Motif-Indices 1980-1995: An Inventory". Asian Folklore Studies. 55 (2): 299–317. doi:10.2307/1178824. JSTOR 1178824.

Examples of related folklore studies indices include the following:

- Baughman, Ernest (1966). Type and Motif-Index of the Folktales of England and North America.
- Boberg, Inger M. (1966). Motif-Index of Early Icelandic Literature. Bibliotheca Arnamagnæana 27. Copenhagen: Munksgaard.
- Bordman, Gerald (1963). Motif-Index of the English Metrical Romances.
- Bray, Dorothy Ann (1992). A list of motifs in the lives of the early Irish saints. FF Communications 252. Helsinki: Academia Scientiarum Fennica.
- Cross, Tom Peete (1952). Motif-Index of Early Irish Literature. Indiana University Publications, Folklore Series 7. Bloomington: Indiana University.
- El-Shamy, Hasan (1995). Folk Traditions in the Arab World: A Guide to Motif Classification. 2 Vols. Bloomington: Indiana University Press.
- El-Shamy, Hasan (2006). Motif Index of The Thousand and One Nights. Bloomington: Indiana University Press.
- Frenzel, Elisabeth (^{6}2008). Motive der Weltliteratur: Ein Lexikon dichtungsgeschichtlicher Längsschnitte. Stuttgart: Kroener.
- Goldberg, Harriet (1998). Motif-index of medieval Spanish folk narratives.
- Goldberg, Harriet (2000). Motif-index of folk narratives in the pan-Hispanic romancero.
- Guerreau-Jalabert, Anita (1992). Index des Motifs Narratifs dans les Romans Arthuriens Français en Vers (XIIe-XIIIe Siècles)/Motif-Index of French Arthurian Verse Romances (12th-13th century). Publications Romanes et Françaises 202. Geneva: Droz.
- Haboucha, Reginetta (1992). Types and motifs of the Judeo-Spanish folktales. New York, London: Garland.
- Jason, Heda (2000). Motif, type, and genre: a manual for compilation of indices & a bibliography of indices and indexing.
- Kirtley, Bacil F. A Motif-Index of Traditional Polynesian Narratives. Honolulu: University of Hawai'i Press, 1971. Accessed September 11, 2021. doi:10.2307/j.ctvp2n3hb.
- Kristić, Branislav (1984). Indeks motiva narodnih pesama balkanskih Slovena. Ed. I. Nikolié. Belgrad: Minerva.
- Lichtblau, K., S. Obermayer, and C. Tuczay, (1982). Motiv-Index der deutschsprachigen weltlichen Erzählliteratur von den Anfangen bis 1400. Fabula 23: 293–95.
- Marzolph, Ulrich (1983). Motiv-Index der arabischen literarischen Anekdote. Fabula 24: 275–7.
- Neugaard, Edward (1993). Motif-index of medieval Catalan folktales. Binghamton, N.Y: Center for Medieval and Early Renaissance Studies.
- Neuland, Lena (1981). Motif-index of Latvian folktales and legends. FF Communications 229. Helsinki: Academia Scientiarum Fennica.
- Ruck, E. H. (1991). An index of themes and motifs in twelfth-century French Arthurian poetry. Arthurian studies 25 Woodbridge: Brewer.
- Sakaoǧlu, S. (1980). Anadolu-tiur efsanelerinde tas kesilme motifi ve efsanelerin tip katalogu. Ankara: Ankara Universitesi Basemev.
- Smith, R. E. (1980). Type-index and motif-index of the Roman de Renard. Uppsala: Etnologiska Institutionen.
- Tracy, Ann B. (1981). The gothic novel 1790-1830: Plot summaries and index to motifs. Lexington: University Press of Kentucky.
- Wurzbach, Natascha and Simone Salz (1995). Motif index of the Child corpus: The English and Scottish popular ballad. Berlin: de Gruyter.

== See also ==
- Comparative mythology
- Mytheme
