= Schildbürger =

Fictitious citizens of a German town of fools

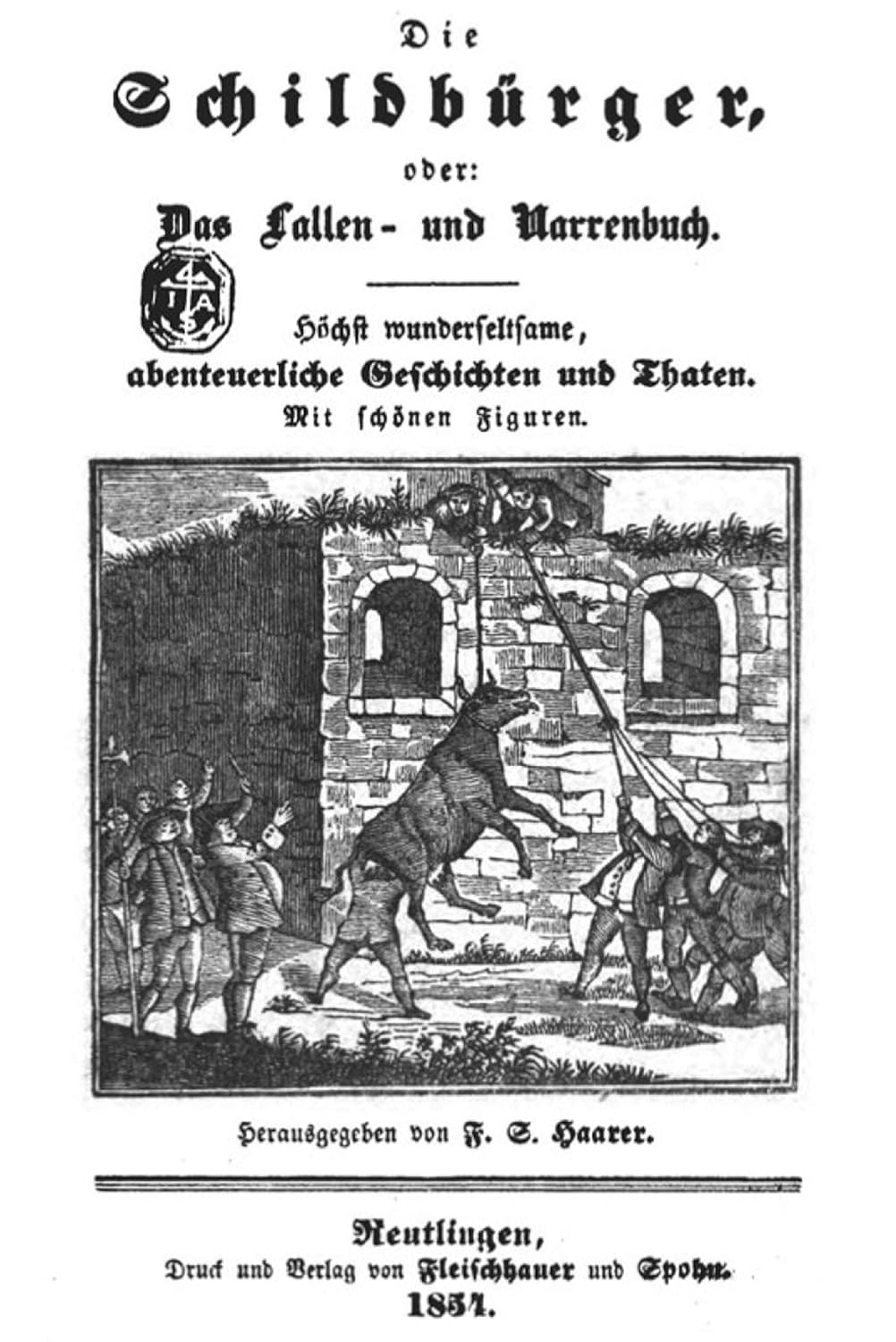
Title page of Die Schildburger, 1854 The picture illustrates the tale how the Schildburger wanted to feed a bull with the grass on the roof

The Schildbürger ("residents of Schilda") are residents of Schilda, a fictional German town of fools, a butt of jokes in German Volksbuch (chapbook) tradition corresponding to the Wise Men of Gotham in English-language tradition.

== Background ==
The "people of Schilda", of a German town of fools named "Schilda" (fictitious – not the actual town of Schilda), figure in short tales, known as Schildbürgerstreiche ("pranks of the citizens of Schilda"). Alongside Till Eulenspiegel, the Schildbürger chapbooks are the best-known collection of the prankster type in German literary tradition.

The oldest known edition was printed in Strasbourg in 1597 under the title of Lalenbuch. Here, the town was known as Lalenburg (Laleburg) and its inhabitants Lalen. The second edition, printed in 1598, changed this to Die Schiltbürger.

The author of the original collection is unknown. One of the suggested possible authors is Friedrich von Schönberg (1543–1614), a native of Schildau.

The first edition was printed anonymously; the title page gives the "author's name" as a subset of the full alphabet. (Note: From the title page: "...translated from Rotwelsch into German by Aabcdefghiklmnopqrstuwxyz. There are too many letters: remove the redundant ones and re-arrange the rest to find the name of the author" [...] auß Rotwelscher in Deutsche Sprach gesetzt / Durch: Aabcdefghiklmnopqrstuwxyz. Die Buchstaben so zu viel sindt/ Nimb auß & wirf hinweg sie geschwindt /Und was dir bleibt / setz rechtzusammen: So hastu deß Autors Namen.)

Sources used include Rollwagenbüchlein by Jörg Wickram (1555), Gartengesellschaft by Jacob Frey (1557) and Katzipori by Michael Lindener (1558), Nachtbüchlein by Valentin Schuhmann (1559) and the Zimmern Chronicle (1566). A related or derived publication is Grillenvertreiber (1603).

The 2010 Encyclopedia of the Medieval Chronicle contains a fictitious entry about a supposed Chronica sive Historia de populo Schildorum.

Julius von Voss wrote a comical novel Die Schildbürger: ein komischer Roman (1823).

== See also ==
- Wise Men of Chełm
- Molbo story
- Till Eulenspiegel
