= Town of fools =

Joke category

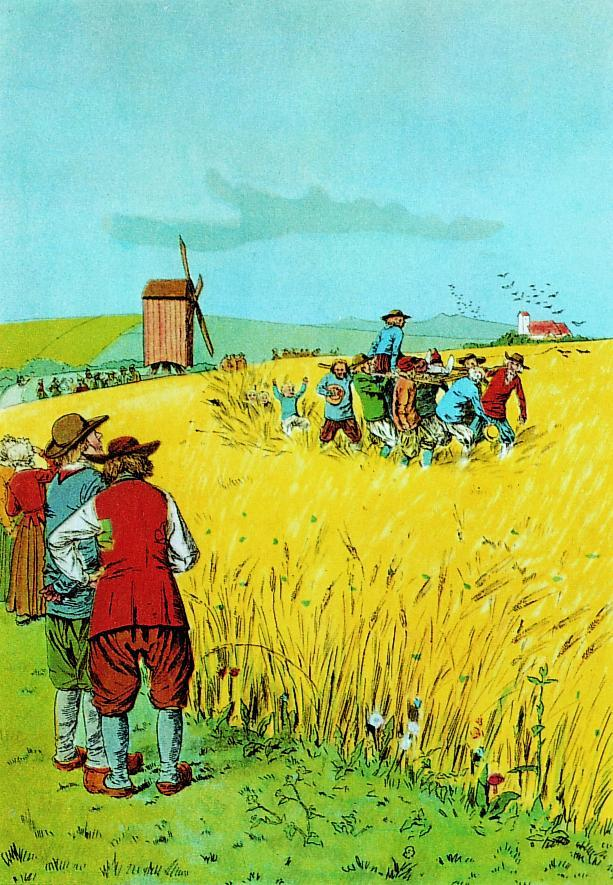
Molbos helped a shepherd to chase away a stork from the grain field while preventing shepherd's big feet from trampling the field

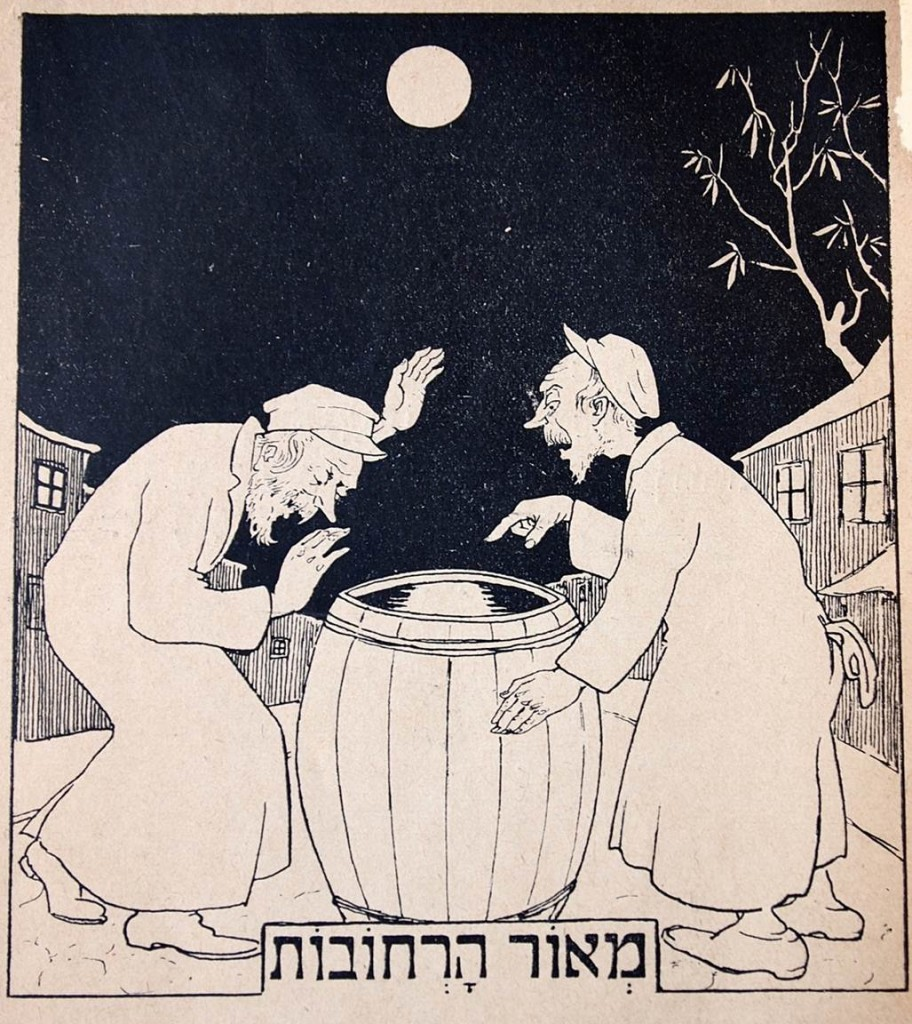
Wise Men of Chelm plotting to capture the Moon in a barrel

A town of fools is the base of a number of joke cycles found in various cultures. Jokes of these cycles poke fun at the stupidity of the inhabitants of a real or fictional populated place (village, town, region, etc.). In English folklore the best known butt of jokes of this type are the Wise Men of Gotham. A number of works of satire are set in a town of fools.

The "town of fools" as a part of an old and widespread tradition of mocking the inhabitants of neighboring populated places by ascribing them various negative traits: stupidity, gluttony, greed, deceitfulness, etc.

The Motif-Index of Folk-Literature includes the motif J1703: "Town (country) of fools".

== Archetypal fools by place of residence ==
- Wise Men of Gotham hail from the village of Gotham, Nottinghamshire
- German Schildbürger are residents of the fictional town of Schilda (as opposed to the actual Schilda municipality). Stories about them originated from a 1597 book Das Lalebuch about the residents of a fictional town of Laleburg
- Greek residents of Abdera. The Philogelos, a Greek-language joke book compiled in the 4th century AD, has a chapter dedicated to jokes about dumb Abderans.
  - Example: An Abderan sees a eunuch talking to a woman and asks whether she is his wife. The eunuch replies that he is not able to have a wife. The man persists: "Perhaps she is your daughter?"
- Finnish residents of the fictional town of Hymylä in children's games
- Hölmölä, another Finnish town of fools
- Swedish minority of Finland traditionally put the numskulls in the village of Bemböle.
- Polish Jewish Wise Men of Chelm
- Danish Molbos (residents of Mols) famed for Molbo stories
- Kocourkov, a fictional Czech village of fools
- Fünsinger from the Fünsing village of fools, known, e.g., from Schwanks by the 16-th century German poet and playwright Hans Sachs
- Moidekars, the residents of the village of Moira in Goa, India.
- The wisdom of the residents of the Dutch city of Kampen, Overijssel gave rise to the term "Kamper onion" (Kamper ui, plural: Kamper uien) for town-of-fools type stories.

== Towns of fools in satire ==
- In Isaac Mayer Dick's 1872 novel Di orkhim in Duratshesok/Duratshtshok (Visitors in Durachok) the "fool's town" is a fictional Russian town of Durachok. (Note: the Russian word durachok means "little fool".) For some reason Dick decided to place Jewish simpletons in a Russian location. In the book Dick draws a comparison of Duratshesok with Chelm saying that Helm has a reputation of vilde narishkaytn (wild foolishness) and gives the examples thereof, which turn out to be retellings of Schildbürger stories and their imitations.
- Mendele Mocher Sforim set some of his stories in a fictional town of Glupsk ("Foolstown", from Russian, 'глупец' for "fool"). Dan Miron suggests that its prototype may be found in a fictional town Ksalon, (Note: not to be confused with real Ksalon) a Biblical name כְּסָלוֹן, Kesalon/Ksalon may allude to the Hebrew word kesil/ksil (כסיל), "fool", from his story Beseter ra'am (Hebrew: בסתר רעם), (Note: "Beseter ra'am" is a allusion to an expression in Psalms 81:7 variously translated as "in the secret place of thunder", "hidden in thunder", etc.) a satirical description of life in a shtetl in Russian Empire. Hillel Halkin gave his reasons why during his translation of Beseter ra'am he used the untranslated Hebrew name Ksalon instead of the "low hanging fruit" choice of "Foolsville".
- Mikhail Saltykov-Shchedrin set a series of is satirical feuilletons in a fictional town of Glupov ("Foolstown", from Russian, 'глупец' for "fool"), culminated in his novel The History of a Town, also translated as Foolsburg: The History of a Town in 2024.

== See also ==
- Blason populaire, an umbrella genre of jokes which make use stereotypes of a particular group
- "An Englishman, an Irishman and a Scotsman"
- Ethnic jokes
- Land of Fools
