= Molbo story =

Danish folktale

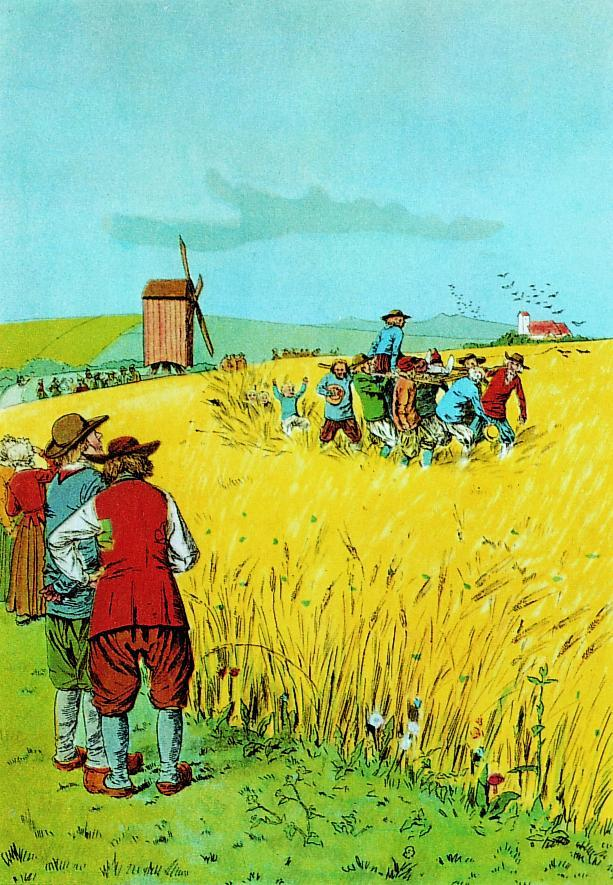
An 1887 depiction how the Molbos helped a shepherd to chase away a stork from the grain field while preventing shepherd's big feet from trampling the field

A Molbo story is a Danish folktale of the "town of fools" type about the people of Mols, who live in eastern Jutland near the town of Ebeltoft. In these tales the Molboes are portrayed as a simple folk, who act foolishly while attempting to be wise.

== History ==
Molbohistorier (Molbo stories) were handed down by generations of Danes before finally appearing in print. Christian Elovius Mangor, who by permission of the Danish monarch Christian VII had started a printing press in Viborg, published the first collection, Tales of the well-known Molboes' wise and brave actions, in 1771. A second edition followed in 1780. Over the years Molbo stories have been published in books for adults and children in several languages, including Danish, Norwegian and English. Similar narratives are found in other cultures. England, for instance, has "Lazy Jack" and "The Wise Men of Gotham." In Finland there are stories about the people of Hölmölä (Hölmöläiset).

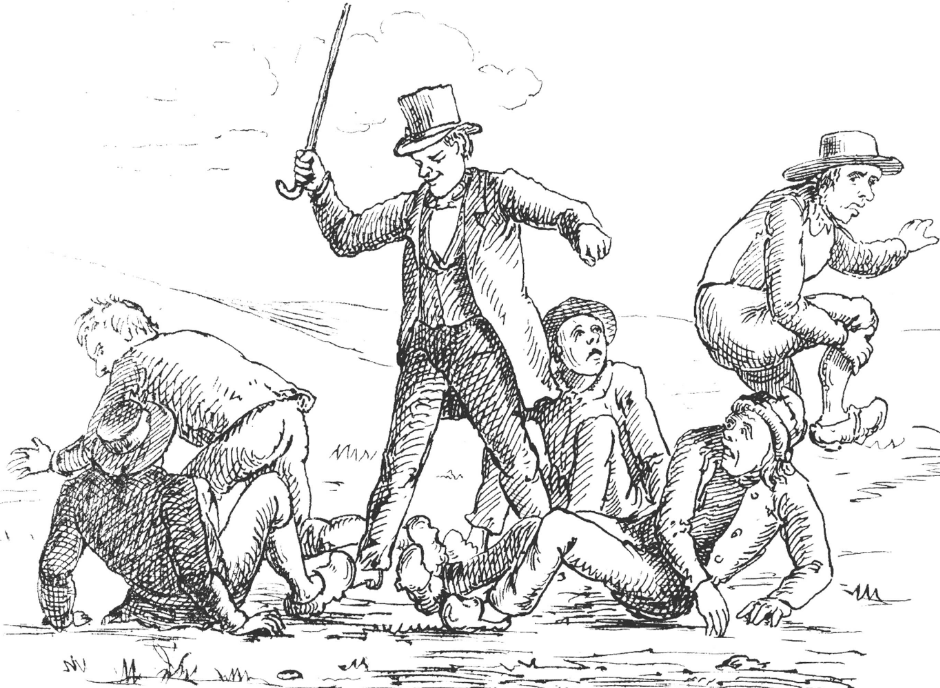
In 1898 the operetta "Molboerne" (The People of Mols) by composer Olfert Jespersen and lyricist Herman Petersen premiered in Copenhagen. The work not only had a memorable score but also references to Molbo stories, such as "The Stork in the Grain Field" and "The Mixed Legs". (Note: Molbos' mixed leg sorting "The mixed legs" Molbo story is known in many cultures and is classified by the Aarne–Thompson–Uther Index as ATU 1288 "Numskulls Cannot Find Their Own Legs".)

Norway, which for nearly three centuries was part of the kingdom of Denmark-Norway, received many cultural influences from Denmark. Consequently, Molbo stories are known in both Denmark and Norway, and the word “Molbo” is used in both countries as a term of disparagement. The expression "Molbo politics" is prohibited when speaking from the rostrum in Norway's parliament.

== The Stork in the Grain Field ==
From Tales of the well-known Molboes' wise and brave actions, 1771

One summer, when the grain was high in the field, the Molbo people had been visited by a stork. It had acquired the nasty habit of strutting back and forth on their fields to catch frogs. And it was bad news, because the Molbo people were very afraid that it would trample all the grain down on the field. They talked together for a long time back and forth about,... how to chase it away. In the end, they agreed that the shepherd should go into the field and drive the stork out.

But just as he stood and was about to enter the grain, they discovered that he had such big and wide feet, and then they were afraid that he would step on more grain than the stork. There they stood - . Finally one of them got a good idea! He suggested that the shepherd should be carried into the field, then he could not tread down the grain. They all thought that was good advice. So they lifted the field gate and set the shepherd on it; ... and then eight men carried him into the corn, so that he could chase the stork out. That way, the shepherd did not trample down traces in the grain field with his big feet.

The Wise Men of Chelm used a similar trick to prevent the city shammes to trample the beautiful, fresh snow in the early morning.

The Motif-Index of Folk-Literature includes the motif J2100: Remedies worse than the disease

== The Headless Man ==
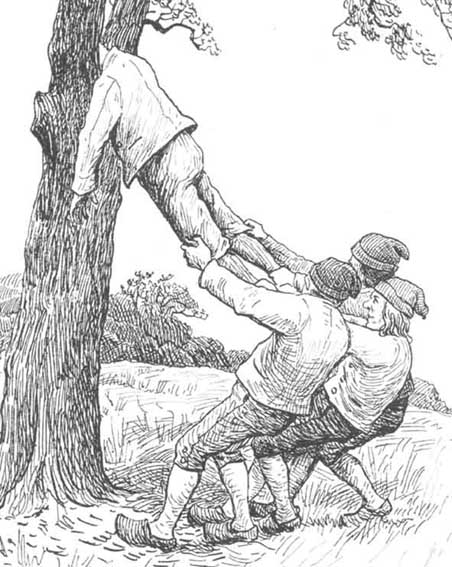
"The Headless Man"

The Molboes have a long way to the forest so they must rise early to collect wood. One morning some of them drove to the forest to bring home a tree they had bought. But on the way the one who drove first happened to lose his axe, and when the others saw that, they thought he threw it away on purpose, so they threw away their axes as well. Now, as they stood in the forest, they had nothing with which to chop, they didn't know what to do at all, and they certainly didn't want to come home empty-handed. Finally one of them had the brilliant idea to pull the tree down; but as they hadn't brought a rope, one of them had to climb the tree and lay his head in the cleavage between two branches then the others were to pull his legs until the tree yielded. Very well, they pulled and they pulled, and eventually they all fell backwards, including the chap they had been pulling, only he had no head. This they couldn't fathom, they went searching and searching, but no, they didn't find the head, because it was stuck in the tree. Well, that couldn't be helped, now it was time to return home. And so they laid the headless man in the wagon and took him home to his wife and asked if she was sure that her husband had brought his head when he left home this morning. "I can't remember that right now!", said the wife; but then she thought for a while: "Oh yes, he did bring his head!" she said. "He ate cabbage with it this morning before he left."

A similar story is known for the dwellers of Fünsing.

== See also ==
- Fool (stock character)
- Wise Men of Gotham
