= The Fools of Chelm and Their History =

Humorous book by Isaac Bashevis Singer

The Fools of Chelm and Their History is a humorous book by Isaac Bashevis Singer about a fictional town of Chelm (not the real Polish town of Chełm) inhabited by naive Wise Men of Chelm.

It was published in Yiddish, signed by the pen name D. Segal, in 1966 and was an evolution of his previous story, "The Political Economy of Chelm", published in the Forverts on March 10, 1966. It was translated in English in 1973, by the author and Elizabeth Shub, illustrated by Uri Shulevitz.

The book was published as children's literature. It is a light read, in essence a series of slapstick jokes, though the full appreciation of the humor therein requires a considerable knowledge of Jewish history, culture, and religion, as well as general political issues.

== Plot summary ==
Table of contents: "How Chelm came to be" -- "Who is the enemy?" -- "The war" -- "The revolt" -- "Chelm without money" -- "Feitel's reign" -- "The future is bright"

"How Chelm came to be" is a brief history of Chelm, a parody on the Book of Genesis and the tradition of pilpul in the arguments about the origin of Chelm. Eventually The Chelmers learn to read and write, create the word "crisis", and suddenly understand their miserly state. (Note: "They learned to read and write, and such words as 'problem' and 'crisis' were created. The moment the word 'crisis' appeared in the language, the people realized there was a crisis in Chelm.") R. Barbara Gitenstein sees this as a parody of a tale from Genesis: the source of all evil is the tree of knowledge.

The Sages of Chelm headed by Gronam Ox convene to figure out how to deal with the crisis and put forth a series of stupid suggestions, such as get rid of the word "crisis" or tax only the poor, culminating in the suggestion to go to war, which gets an approval. The war is lost because Chelmers by mistake invade the wrong town: instead of the neighboring Gorshkov, (Note: "Gorshkov" is derived from the Russian word горшок, "crock") they go to Mazelborscht, (Note: "Mazelborscht" is a pun with "mazel tov": "Mazel + "borscht".) where a wedding party happens, and Mazelborschters, annoyed by the disruption, beat up Chelmers. As the story goes, "a lost war sooner or later is followed by a revolution, that is what happened in Chelm."

The rest of the tale is a sequence of Chelmer's attempts to deal with poverty, which are parodies on various socialist and communist ideas, and none of which worked.

At the end of the book Gronam Ox says: "We do not wish to conquer the world, but our wisdom is spreading throughout it just the same. The future is bright. The chances are good that someday the whole world will be one great Chelm" - a parody on the idea of the victory of Communism.

Ruth von Bernuth remarks that the above is a reflection of author's skepticism towards utopian societies.

The final words of Gromal Ox resonate with the words at the end of another Singer's story, When Shlemiel Went to Warsaw (although describing a different situation):

All roads lead to Chelm
All the world is one big Chelm.
