= When Shlemiel Went to Warsaw =

Short story by Isaac Bashevis Singer

"When Shlemiel Went to Warsaw" (Note: Original Yiddish title: ווען שלימואל איז געגאנגען קיין ווארשע, Ven Shlemiel iz gegangen keyn Varshe, "How Shlemiel did not Go to Warsaw")) is a short story by Jewish American author Isaac Bashevis Singer from his cycle about the Wise Men of Chełm.

The 1968 book When Shlemiel Went to Warsaw and Other Stories was a 1969 Newbery Honor book, Singer's third consecutive Newbery Honor (1967, 1968).

== Plot ==
On his journey from Chelm to Warsaw Shlemiel decides to take a nap by the roadside. To know where to go when he wakes up, he points his boots in the direction of Warsaw. A passer-by turns the boots in the opposite direction, and when Shlemiel is up and on the go, he arrives to a town with striking similarities to his own hometown of Chelm, together with his home, wife (whose husband's name is Shlemiel), and children. But of course it cannot be his Chelm, but rather a second Chelm. When he is going to continue his journey, the city elders persuade him to stay until the "other" Shlemiel returns, to take care of the "other" family. Clearly, the other Shlemiel never returns...

The key points of the plot resemble the story of a rabbi, who sets out in a wagon from Chelm to a nearby city, but while he was asleep, the wagon driver drives around for a while and then deposits the rabbi back in Chelm. The early print of this story may be found in the 1887 book Der Khelemer khokhlem by an obscure writer Herts Bik. Only a single copy of the book is known, in the National Library of Jerusalem.

== Adaptations ==
Singer combined this story with others from his Chelm cycle into the play Shlemiel the First, which was adapted into a musical with the same title by Robert Brustein in 1994 (before that he produced the original Singer's play in 1974).

The Real Shlemiel is a French-German-Israeli-Hungarian animated film loosely based on this and other Singer's stories

Village of Idiots is a 1999 Canadian short animated comedy based on this story.

Jelena Sitar Cvetko created the puppet performance "When Shlemiel went to Warsaw" ("Kako je Šlemil šel v Varšavo"), Puppet Theatre Maribor, Slovenia, for which she earned the award for the best direction at the 2014 International Puppetry Festival (Međunarodni festival lutkarstva). It was also awarded at the Polish Eurofest and Serbian The Golden Spark (Zlatna Iskra).
