= Guru Paramartha =

Fictional foolish Buddhist monk

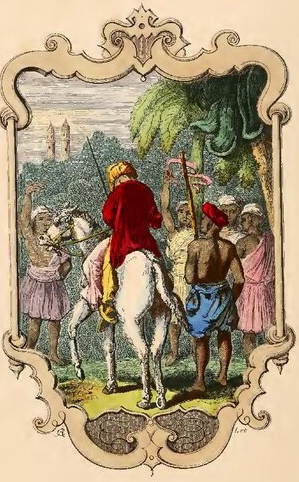
An illustration from the 1961 translation Strange surprising adventures of the venerable Gooroo Simple...

Guru Paramartha or Gooroo Paramartan is a fictional monk introduced in Tamil culture by Catholic missionary Constanzo Beschi (known for Tamils as Veeramamunivar) in his book Paramarthaguruvin Kadhai (பரமார்த்த குருவின் கதை - The Adventures of Guru Paramartha). Published in 1728, it is a collection of satirical stories about a naive religious teacher and his equally obtuse disciples, Matti (dull-head), Madayan (fool), Pethai (ignoramus), Moodan (moron) and Milechan (lowly dull-wit). (Note: Benjamin Babington translated the names as Blockhead, Idiot, Simpleton, Dunce and Fool, and gave the name of the guru as "Gooroo Noodle") It had a considerable influence on Tamil culture and even in modern says the name "Guru Paramartha" is synonymous to "fool". It has also been adapted into other South Asian languages. Examples include Mahadenamutta in Sinhala.

One of the stories goes as follows. One day they came to a river they had to cross, but they were afraid to do so while the river was awake. To test if the river was asleep, Moodan touched the water with a firebrand, and hearing the ‘hissing’ sound he reported that the river is still awake. After a while Madayan used the same firebrand for testing the river, but since it was already extinguished, there was no sound, and Madayan reported that the river was asleep, so they crossed it. After they crossed the river, they tried to count themselves to make sure all six were safe. But each time anyone counted, he got only five, because he didn't count himself. They went on mourning the missing person, but luckily a passer-by declared himself having powers to recall the one swallowed by the river, for a reward. After that he placed them in a row and counted all six of them.

== Commentary ==
While in South India, Beschi compiled a collection of stories about various foolish deeds and attributed them to a Hindu guru from a monastery. Aravindan Neelakandan remarks that these stories were not invented by Beschi. Benjamin Babington of East India Company translated them in English in 1822 (Note: Paramār̲atakuruvin̲ Katai: The Adventures of the Gooroo Paramartan; a Tale in the Tamul Language Accompanied by a Translation and Vocabulary, Together with an Analysis of the First Story There also is a modern English translation as The Stupid Guru and His Foolish Disciples (ISBN 8187619104).) and noted the similarity of them with the stories about the Wise Men of Gotham, concluding that either they were either borrowed from the latter or they had a common source.

Neelakandan further remarks that the origin of the "counting" story might be in Hindu spiritual literature. Panchadasi contains a chapter which quotes the story about 10 persons crossing a river and lamenting the missing 10th person. This humorous tale was used in Panchadasi to comment on direct knowledge (abhijñā), indirect knowledge (paroksha), and ignorance.

Neelakandan notices that while the Hindu treatise used this story to elaborate on wisdom, commenters wrote that Beschi's goal was to satirize Hindu monks. The reason is that the monasteries were seen as an obstacle for Christian proselytizing. In particular, the "counting" story portrays Hindu monks as fools and an ordinary Hindu as a con man. Combined with the teachings that Catholic missionaries are enlightening the Tamils, Beschi's book essentially imposed the feeling of civilizational inferiority onto the colonized people.
