= Wise Men of Gotham =

Folklore about the people of Gotham, Nottinghamshire

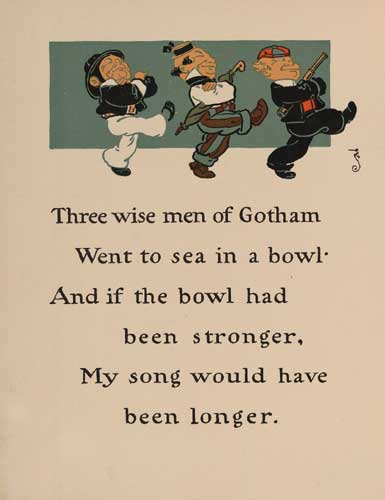
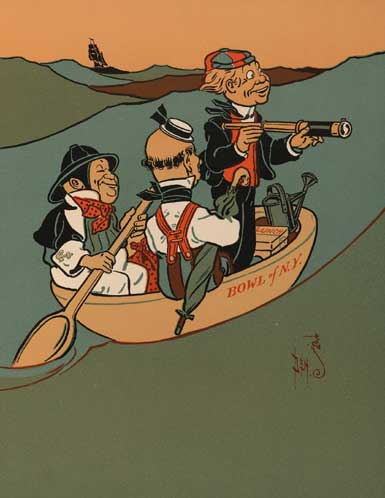
William Wallace Denslow's illustrations for Three Wise Men of Gotham, from a 1901 edition of Mother Goose

Wise Men of Gotham is the early name given to the people of the village of Gotham, Nottinghamshire, in allusion to an incident where they supposedly feigned idiocy to avoid a Royal visit.

== Legend ==
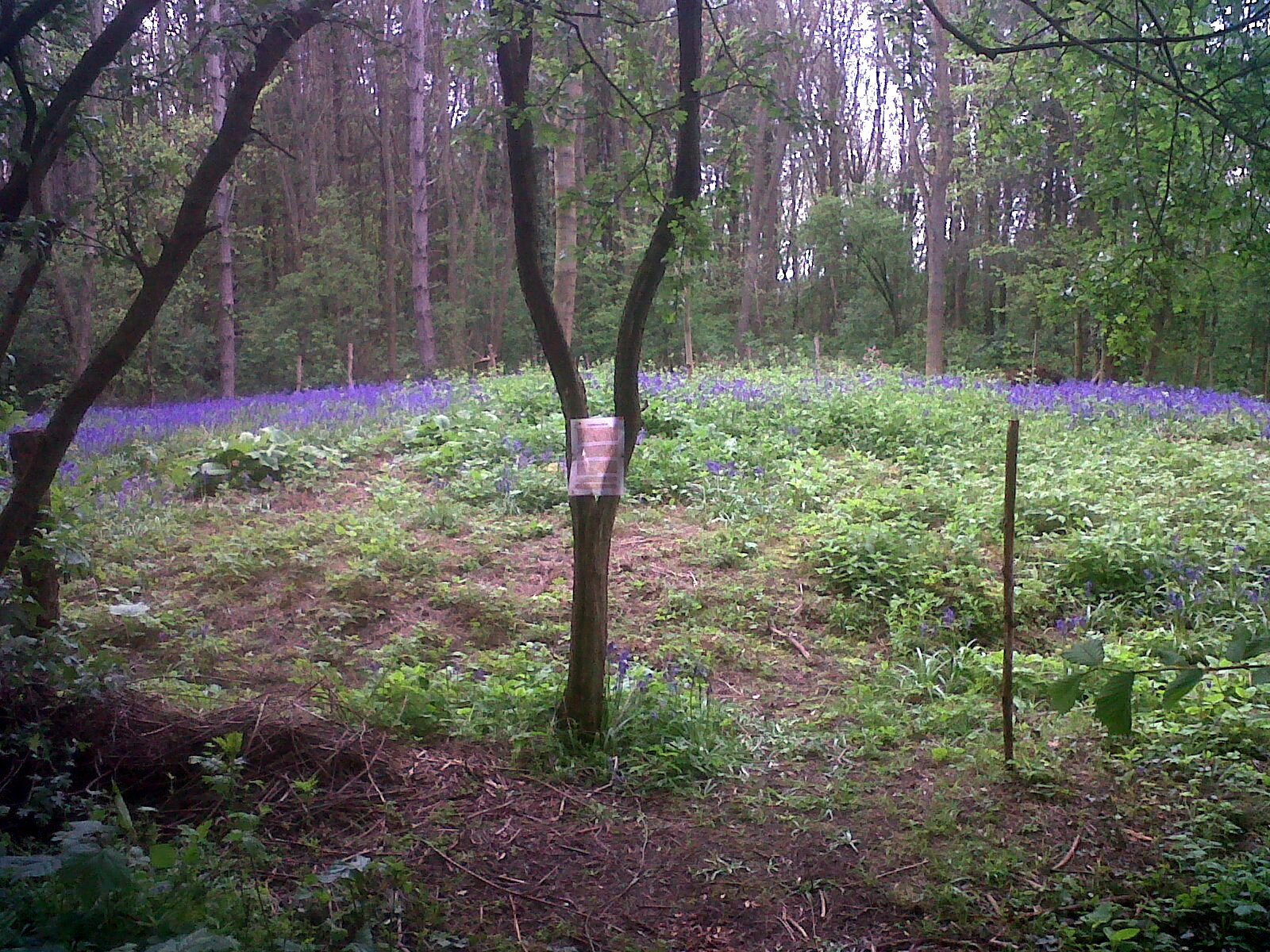
Cuckoo Bush Mound is the alleged site for the tale of the Wise Men of Gotham's attempt at fencing in the cuckoo. It is actually a 3,000-year-old Neolithic burial mound, and was excavated in 1847.

The story goes that King John intended to travel through the neighbourhood. At that time in England, any road the king travelled on had to be made a public highway, but the people of Gotham did not want a public highway through their village. The villagers feigned imbecility when the royal messengers arrived. Wherever the messengers went, they saw the rustics engaged in some absurd task. Based on this report, John determined to have his hunting lodge elsewhere, and the wise men boasted, "We ween there are more fools pass through Gotham than remain in it."

According to the 1874 edition of Blount's Tenures of Land, King John's messengers "found some of the inhabitants engaged in endeavouring to drown an eel in a pool of water; some were employed in dragging carts upon a large barn, to shade the wood from the sun; others were tumbling their cheeses down a hill, that they might find their way to Nottingham for sale; and some were employed in hedging in a cuckoo which had perched upon an old bush which stood where the present one now stands; in short, they were all employed in some foolish way or other which convinced the king's servants that it was a village of fools, whence arose the old adage, "the wise men of Gotham" or "the fools of Gotham".

The Towneley Mysteries mentioned the "foles of Gotham" as early as the fifteenth century, and a collection of their jests was published in the sixteenth century under the title Merrie Tales of the Mad Men of Gotham, gathered together by A.B. of Phisicke Doctour. The "A.B." was supposed to represent Andrew Borde or Boorde (1490?–1549), famous among other things for his wit, but he probably had nothing to do with the compilation.

== Similar stories ==
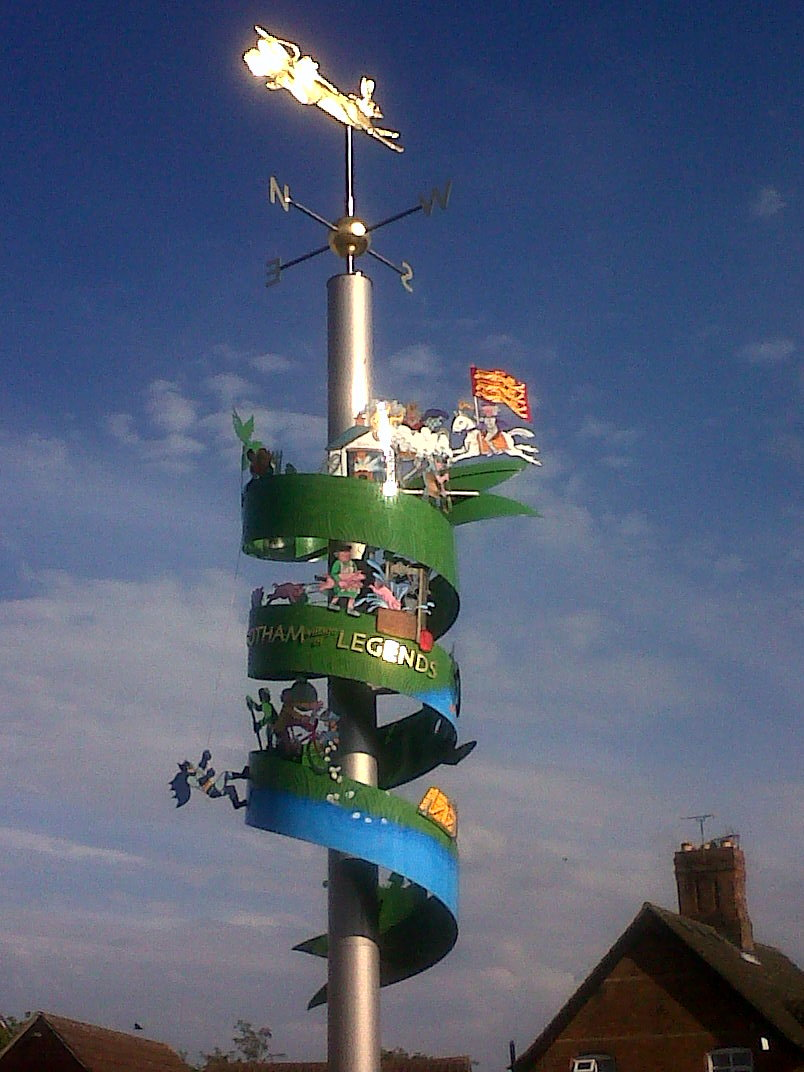
Gotham Legends wind vane erected in the centre of village

The localizing of fools is common to most countries, and folklorists have a special term for this genre: blason populaire. There are many other reputed imbecile centres in Britain besides Gotham. Thus there are the people of Coggeshall, Essex; the "carles" of Austwick, Yorkshire; the "gowks" of Gordon, Berwickshire; and for many centuries the charge of folly has been made against silly Suffolk and Norfolk (Descriptio Norfolciensium about twelfth century, printed in Wright's Early Mysteries and other Latin Poems).

In Germany, there are the "Schildbürger", from the town of Schilda; in the Netherlands, the people of Kampen; in Bohemia, the people of Kocourkov; and in Moravia the people of Šimperk. There are also the Swedish Täljetokar from Södertälje and Kälkborgare from Kälkestad, and the Danish tell tales of the foolish inhabitants of Mols, while the Finnish talk of the Hölmöläiset and the Bembölebor. In Romania, Caracal is known as the place where "the cart of fools tipped over". Among the ancient Greeks Boeotia and Cyme were the homes of fools; among the Thracians, Abdera; among the ancient Jews, Nazareth; among Ashkenazi Jews, Chełm; among the ancient Anatolians, Phrygia.

In the United States, Florida Man is a memetic character, representing the supposed outlandishness of Florida and its residents. Its name comes from news article headlines reporting on unusual stories from Florida, where they refer to a Florida Man.

== Nursery rhyme ==
The Wise Men of Gotham are recalled in a popular nursery rhyme with a Roud Folk Song Index number of 19695, an adaptation of the tale Three Sailors of Gotham. The lyrics are:

Three wise men of Gotham,
They went to sea in a bowl,
And if the bowl had been stronger
My song would have been longer.

The rhyme was first recorded in Mother Goose's Melody published around 1765, and from then appeared in many collections.

== Legacy ==
In Thomas Paine’s Rights of Man (1791) Paine asserts that Edmund Burke “puts the nation as fools on one side, and places his government of wisdom, all wise men of Gotham, on the other side.”

Reminded of the foolish ingenuity of Gotham's residents, Washington Irving gave the name "Gotham" to New York City in his Salmagundi Papers (1807).

There is a passing reference to the wise men of Gotham in Lorna Doone (1869).

The most notable use of the name Gotham in popular culture was by Bill Finger in naming the home of Batman, Gotham City. In a story titled "Cityscape" in Batman Chronicles #6 (1996) it is revealed that Gotham was initially built for the purpose of housing the criminally insane, and Robin reads a journal that tells of how Gotham got its name: "I even have a name for it. We could call it 'Gotham' after a village in England – where, according to common belief, all are bereft of their wits." In DC Comics' The Batman of Arkham (2000) the Joker recites the "Wise Men of Gotham" rhyme specifically. The existence of Gotham, Nottinghamshire in the DC Universe was acknowledged in Batman: Legends of the Dark Knight #206 (2006), and again in 52 #27 (2007), although the connection between two names within the DCU has not been fully explained.

Responding to the connection between Gotham, Nottinghamshire and the name Gotham for New York City, Rudolph Giuliani, former mayor of New York, wrote that it was "a pleasure to have this opportunity to acknowledge the cultural and historical link" between the two places.

A French artist, Bertrand Joliet, took this story as a topic for his artistic production.

== See also ==
- English folklore
- Feigned madness
- Gotham City, comic book city of Batman
- Molbo story
- Moonrakers
- Ship of fools
- Simpleton
- The Praise of Folly
- Wise Men of Chelm
- Guru Paramartha
