= Wise Men of Chelm =

Jewish humor about a city of fools

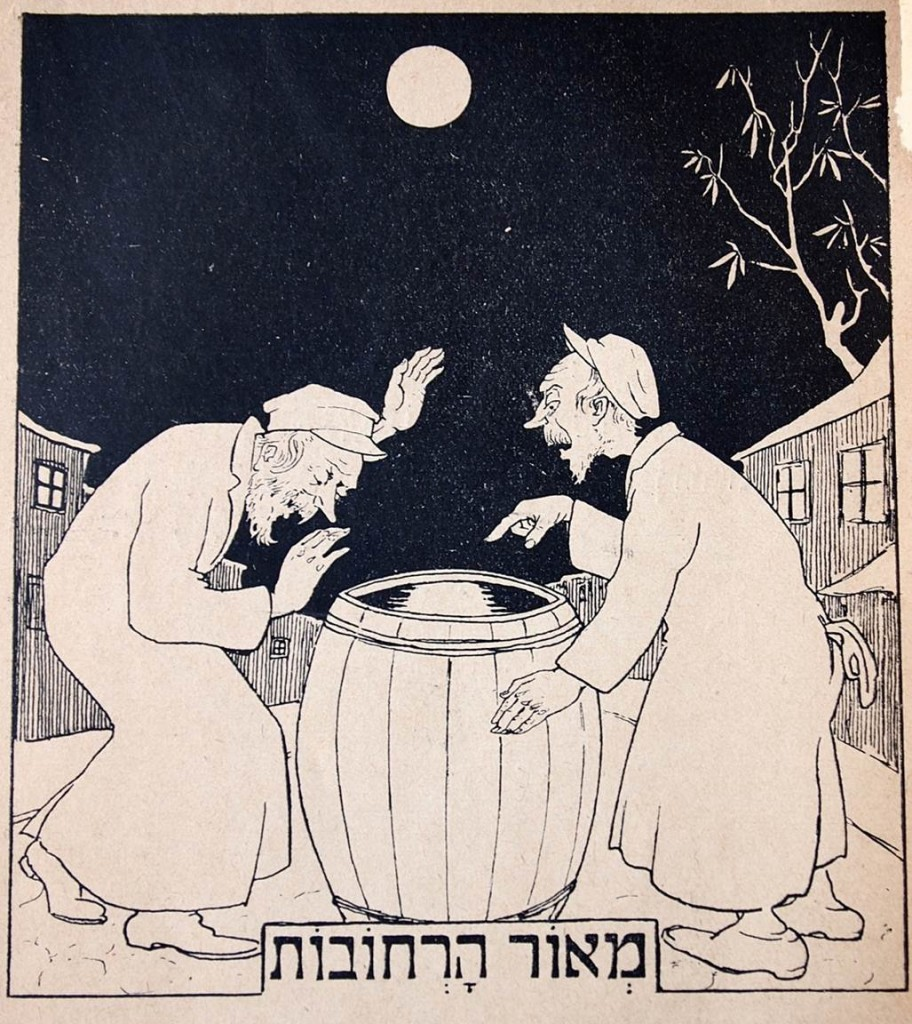
Chelmers plotting to capture the Moon in a barrel

The Wise Men of Chelm (Yiddish: די כעלמער חכמים, romanized: Di Khelemer khakhomim) are foolish Jewish residents of the Polish city of Chełm, a butt of Ashkenazi Jewish humor, similar to residents of other towns of fools: the English Wise Men of Gotham, German Schildbürger, Greek residents of Abdera, and others. Since at least 14th century Chełm had a considerable population of Jews.

Many of the Chelmer jokes are about silly solutions to problems. Some of these solutions display "foolish wisdom" (reaching the correct answer by the wrong train of reasoning), while others are simply wrong. Some Chełm stories emulate the interpretive process of Midrash and the Talmudic style of argumentation, and continue the dialogue between rabbinic texts and their manifestation in the daily arena. The seemingly tangential questioning that is typical of the Chełm Jewish Council can be interpreted as a comedic hint at the vastness of Talmudic literature. The combination of paralleled argumentation and linguistic commonality allows the Jewish textual tradition, namely Talmudic, to shine through Chełm folklore.

One Jewish Chelmer bought a fish on Friday in order to cook it for Sabbath. He put the live fish underneath his coat and the fish slapped his face with its tail. He went to the Chełm court with a complaint against the fish and the court sentenced the fish to death by drowning.

== History of print ==
The first documented Chelm-like stories in Yiddish were published in 1597. In 1727, stories about Schildbürger were translated into Yiddish under the title "Vunder zeltzame, kurtzvaylige, lustige, unt rekht lakherlikhe geshikhte unt datn der velt bekantn Shild burger" ("Wonderfully rare, brief, hearty, and quite laughable stories and facts about the world-famous burghers of Schilda"), and stories of this type entered into Jewish folklore. Initially some other towns with Jewish populations were "fools' towns", but eventually Chelm was firmly established as an archetypal one, although there is no documentary evidence on how this happened. A collection of jokes which hinted at fools of Chelm was published in 1867 in an anonymous book Blitsende vitsen oder lakhpilen (Brilliant joke or laughing pills), now attributed to Isaac Mayer Dick, six tales of which had become to known as The wisdom of a certain town Khes. (Note: "Khes" (ח) is a letter of the Yiddish alphabet, the first letter of one of the two spellings of Chelm in Yiddish: חעלעם Chelem; the other being כעלעם, Khelem, so it is plausible to assume it as an allusion to Chelm) In Dick's 1872 novel Di orkhim in Duratshesok/Duratshtshok (Visitors in Durachok) the "fool's town" is a fictional Russian town of Durachok, where the Russian word дурачок means "little fool". For some reason Dick decided to place Jewish simpletons in a Russian location. In the latter book Dick draws a comparison of Duratshesok with Chelm saying that Helm has a reputation of vilde harishkeyn (wild foolishness) and gives the examples thereof, which turn out to be retellings of Schildbürger stories and their imitations.

The 1873 Deutsche Sprichwörter Lexikon ("Lexicon of German Proverbs") by Karl Friedrich Wilhelm Wander contains an entry Chelmer narrunim ("Fools of Chelm") with the explanation "Because of its inhabitants, the town of Chelm in Poland has a reputation similar to that of Schilda, Schöppenstedt, Polkwitz, among others, in Germany. Many amusing stories about it are in circulation, similar to the antics of the Abderites and to jokes about Schilda. Among other things, they put an inscription of the stove in a synagogue: 'This stove belongs to the synagogue of Chelm' in order to protect it from stealing." (Note: Explanation of the joke: in these old times stoves were massive structures made of brick or stone, which were hardly possible to steal)

Ruth von Bernuth writes that the first book title which mentions both "Chelm" and "wisdom" and the first book exclusively devoted to the fools of Chelm is the 1887 book Der Khelemer khokhlem by an obscure writer Herts Bik. Only a single copy of the book is known, in the National Library of Jerusalem, where Ruth von Bernuth worked on a research grant.

In the 19th–20th centuries numerous collections about Khelemer were published in Yiddish, also translated into English and Hebrew. Many Yiddish writers published their own versions of Chelm stories or used folkloric themes from them, including Y. L. Peretz, Leyb Kvitko, and Isaac Bashevis Singer's The Fools of Chelm and Their History Mendele Mocher Sforim invented three shtetls inhabited by naive, luckless Jews, reminiscent of the wise men of Chelm: Kabtzansk (loosely meaning "Pauperville", from Yiddish: קבצנ, "pauper", "beggar"), Tuneyadevke ("Idlersville", from Russian 'тунеядец', "freeloader", "idler"), and Glupsk ("Foolstown", from Russian, 'глупец' for "fool"). Many of Sholem Aleichem's stories are set in a fictional shtetl of Kasrilevka.

The Soviet Yiddish poet Ovsey Driz published a collection of verse, Khelemer khakhomim, translated into Russian as "Хеломские мудрецы" in 1969, which was republished in post-Soviet Russia several times.

Other notable adaptations of folklore Chełm stories into the mainstream culture are the comedy Chelmer Chachomim ("The Wise Men of Chelm") by Aaron Zeitlin, The Heroes of Chelm (Di Helden fun Khelm, 1942) by Shlomo Simon, published in English translation as The Wise Men of Helm (Solomon Simon, 1945) and More Wise Men of Helm (Solomon Simon, 1965), and the book Chelmer Chachomim by Y. Y. Trunk. The animated short film comedy Village of Idiots also recounts Chełm tales.

Menachem Kipnis was one of the major contributors to Chelm lore. He published a column of Chelm stories in the Warsaw Yiddish daily Haynt, pretending to be a journalist reporting from Chelm. There is a (possibly apocryphal) story that the women of Chelm asked Kipnis to stop doing this because their daughters could not find bridegrooms: every time they hear from shadkhn that the girl is from Chelm, they cannot stop laughing. He later published these tales in the book Khelemer mayses (Chelm Stories; Polish transcription: Chelemer Majses, 1930).

Khelmer khakhomim oder yidn fun der kligster shtot in der welt ("The Wise Men of Chelm, or the Jews from the Wisest Town in the World") (1951) by Yehiel Yeshaya Trunk was described by Or Rogovin as "a vast book of sophisticated tales that artistically fuse the different Chelm traditions with innovative plots and historical, linguistic, and cultural material. Using mostly formalist methodology, this essay analyzes the devices and materials constituting a process I call shtetlization, in which the Chelm of folklore is immersed with the spirit and qualities of the shtetl to create not a realistic East European Jewish town but a myth of it. Locating Trunk’s work in its circumstances of writing, my conclusion explores Khelemer khakhomim as a means of commemoration of the lost world of the shtetl in the aftermath of the Holocaust".

Allen Mandelbaum's Chelmaxioms : The Maxims, Axioms, Maxioms of Chelm (1977) treats the wise men less as fools than as an "echt Chelm" of true scholars who in their narrow specialized knowledge are nonetheless knowledgeable but lacking sense. The poetry of Chelmaxioms is supposedly coming from the discovered lost manuscripts of the wise men of Chelm.

Ruth von Bernuth lists more authors, including well into the 21st century, who took inspiration in Chelm stories.

== Further examples ==
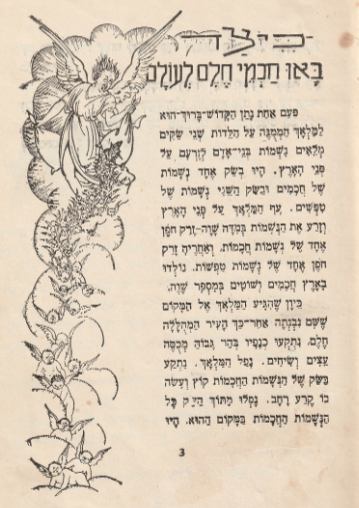
Torn sack of fools over Chelm

An explanation how Chelm happened to be full of wise men (note that Chelm is situated atop of a hill, as its name alludes: "chełm" means "helmet" in Polish):

It is said that after God made the world, he filled it with people. He sent off an angel with two sacks, one full of wisdom and one full of foolishness. The second sack was much heavier. So after a time it started to drag. Soon it got caught on a mountaintop and so all the foolishness spilled out and fell into Chełm.

Another one capitalizing on the location of Chelm atop of a hill:

The town of Chełm decided to build a new synagogue. So, some strong, able-bodied men were sent to a mountaintop to gather heavy stones for the foundation. The men put the stones on their shoulders and trudged down the mountain to the town below. When they arrived, the town constable yelled, "Foolish men! You should have rolled the stones down the mountain!" The men agreed this was an excellent idea. So they turned around, and with the stones still on their shoulders, trudged back up the mountain, and rolled the stones back down again.

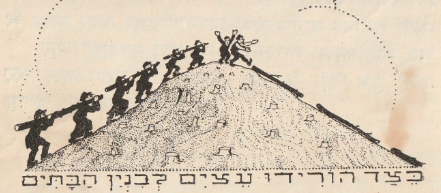
Chelmers learned an easy way to bring logs from the mountaintop

Alter Druyanov in The Book of Jokes and Wit tells a slightly different story: about logs carrying vs. stone rolling.

Many stories poke fun at the sagacity of the Rabbinic sages of Chelm.

In Chełm, the shammes used to go around waking everyone up for minyan (communal prayer) in the morning. Every time it snowed, the people would complain that, although the snow was beautiful, they could not see it in its pristine state because by the time they got up in the morning, the shammes had already trekked through the snow. The townspeople decided that they had to find a way to be woken up for minyan without having the shammes making tracks in the snow.
The people of Chełm hit on a solution: they got four volunteers to carry the shammes around on a table when there was fresh snow in the morning. That way, the shammes could make his wake up calls, but he would not leave tracks in the snow. (Note: This story is a retelling of a one from the Schildbürgerbuch and was also published in Dick's The Wisdom of a Certain Town Khes. Also, a similar Danish tale published in 1771 describes how the Molbos chased away a stork from the grain field using a similar trick. Issac Isaac Bashevis Singer’s 1966 story "The Snow in Chelm" contains a similar idea, but elaborated further: "The Elders of Chelm clutched at their white beards and admitted to one another that they had made a mistake. Perhaps, they reasoned, four others should have carried the four men who had carried the table that held Gimpel the errand boy". Stories of this type are classified by the Motif-Index of Folk-Literature under the motif J2100: Remedies worse than the disease)

A young housewife living in the town of Chełm had a very strange occurrence. One morning, after buttering a piece of bread she accidentally dropped it on the floor. To her amazement, it fell buttered side up. As everyone knows, whenever a buttered piece of bread is dropped on the floor, it always falls buttered side down; this is like a law of physics. But on this occasion it had fallen buttered side up, and this was a great mystery which had to be solved. So all the Rabbis and elders and wise men of Chełm were summoned together and they spent three days in the synagogue fasting and praying and debating this marvelous event among themselves. After those three days they returned to the young housewife with this answer: "Madam, the problem is that you have buttered the wrong side of the bread."

There are several variants on how the wise men of Khelm tried to capture the moon for their own by trapping its reflection in a barrel or in a well, although this folly is found in folktales in many locations all over the world. It appears that its first Jewish version was published in Dick's The Wisdom of a Certain Town Khes.

=== How Chelm was burned down ===
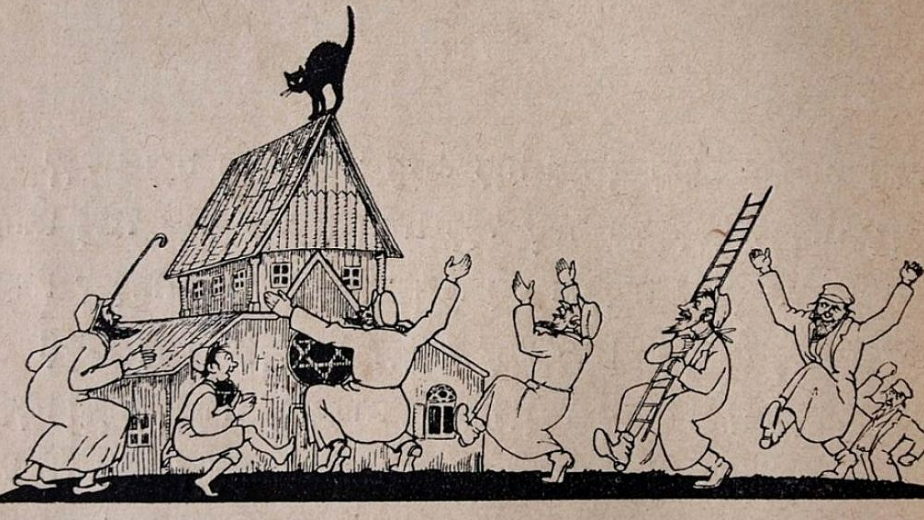
Chelmers chasing the cat. From Khakhme Khelm by F. Halperin, 1926

Chelm was plagued by mice. They bought a cat from a German, but they thought he was Russian. When he was boarding a train in the last minute, they asked him (in Russian) what the cat will eat when it is done with the mice. The German did not understand them and asked in German "Was?" ("What?"), but the Chelmers thought that he answered in Russian "Vas!", meaning "You!" Scared, they tried to kill the cat. They chased the cat into the synagogue, locked the door and set it on fire, but the cat jumped out the window and into the house next door. They then attempted to burn down the house, but the cat escaped again. "So," the story concludes, "the whole Chelm was burned down, but the cat lives to this day".

An almost identical story is told about the Schildburgers: They put a cat into the granary to hunt mice, but due to a miscommunication, came to believe that the cat would eat them after it ate the mice. They set fire to the granary, eventually burning down the whole town and fleeing to the forest.

== See also ==
- The Real Shlemiel, an animated film set in a fictional Chelm
- When Shlemiel Went to Warsaw
- Village of Idiots, Canadian short animated comedy with the plot based on When Shlemiel Went to Warsaw
