= Schwank (comedy) =

Short humorous story, play, song, opera, etc.

In German-speaking cultures, Schwank (pronounced [ʃvaŋk]) is a genre of short funny tale, verse, song, play, opera, etc. In German, common meanings for the word Schwank are "prank", "funny tale", told for entertainment.

The Kleines Literarisches Lexikon (1966) offers a distinction of Schwank from other forms of comedy: Schwank delivers light, harmless, carefree humor, which distinguishes it from comedy, which ridicules something; from Lustspiel, which offers much hilarity; and from farce (de:Posse), with its crude boisterousness.

In relation to the narrative tradition, the term presents a difficulty in translation, being inadequately translated as "joke" or "anecdote". Elliott Oring explains the difference between the German terms Schwank and Witz.

Other German types of literary and scenic art involving comedy include the Posse mit Gesang, Klamotte, Lustspiel, Volksstück, and Festspiel.

== See also ==
- Fabliau
- Facetia
