= Basilica of the Birth of the Virgin Mary, Chełm =

Church building in Chełm, Poland

Coordinates: 51°07′53.3″N 23°28′49.7″E

Basilica of the Birth of the Virgin Mary Bazylika Narodzenia Najświętszej Maryi Panny (in Polish)
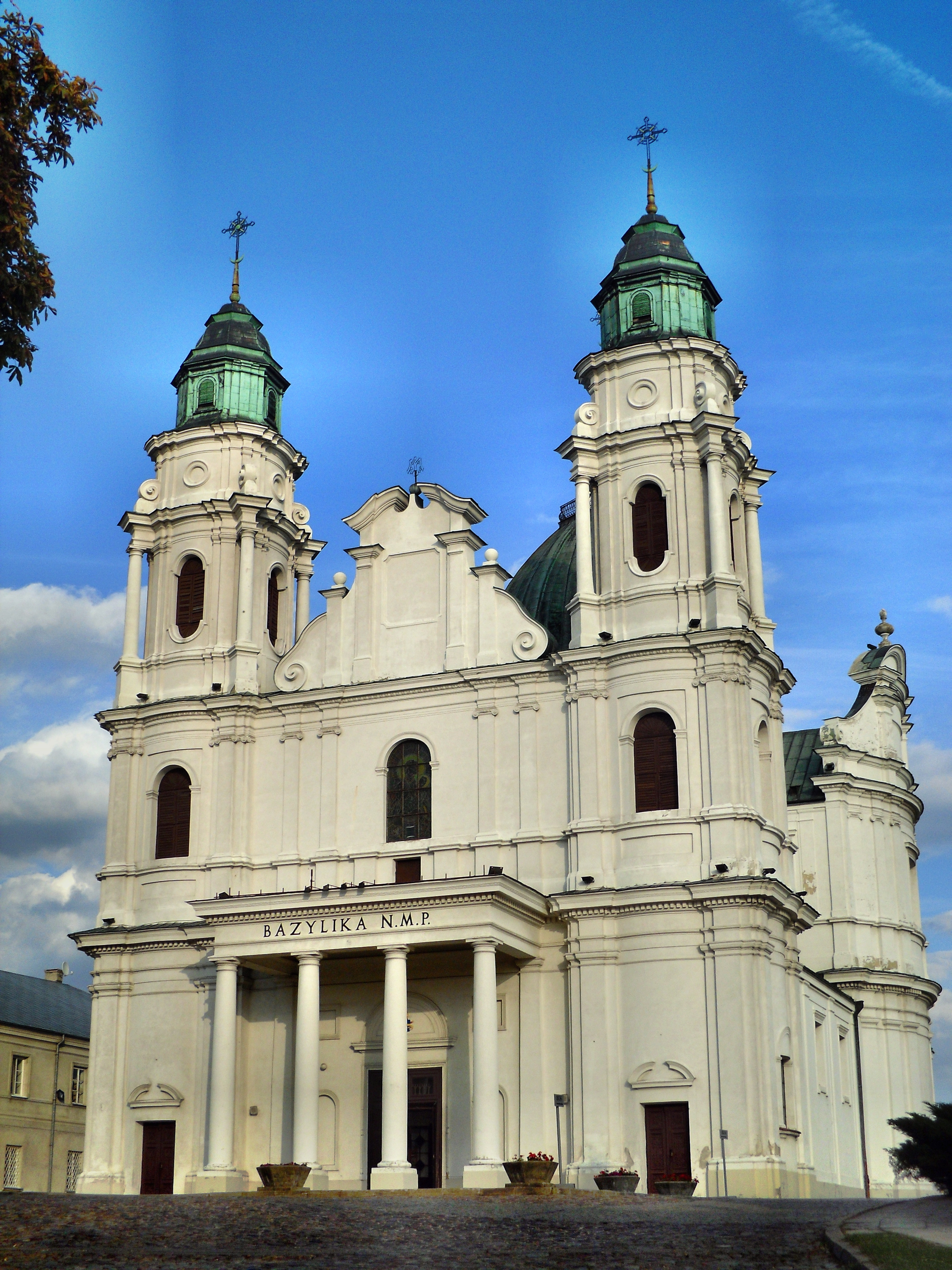

Religion
- Affiliation: Roman Catholic Church (Latin Church)
- Rite: Roman Rite

Location
- Location: Chełm, Poland
- Interactive map of Basilica of the Birth of the Virgin Mary; Bazylika Narodzenia Najświętszej Maryi Panny (in Polish)

Architecture
- Architect: Paweł Antoni Fontana
- Style: Baroque
- Completed: 18th century (current church)

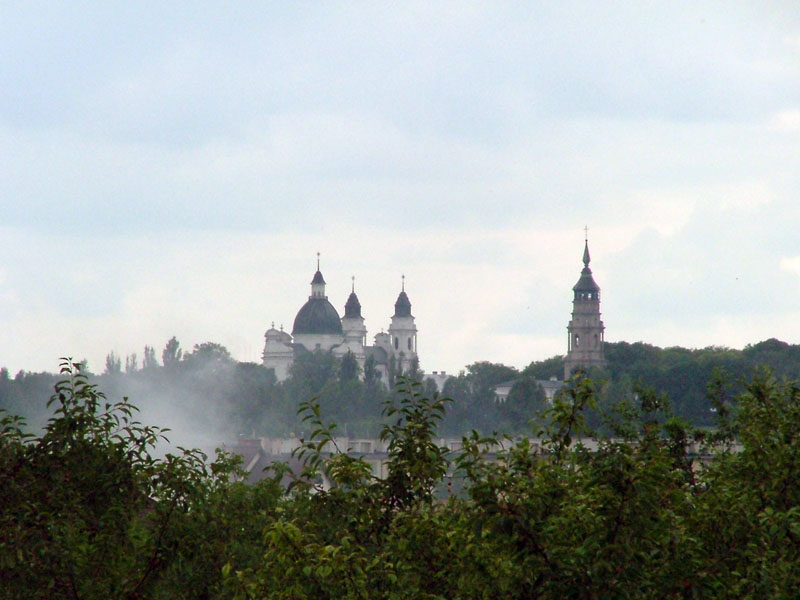
Chełm's Hill, Cathedral

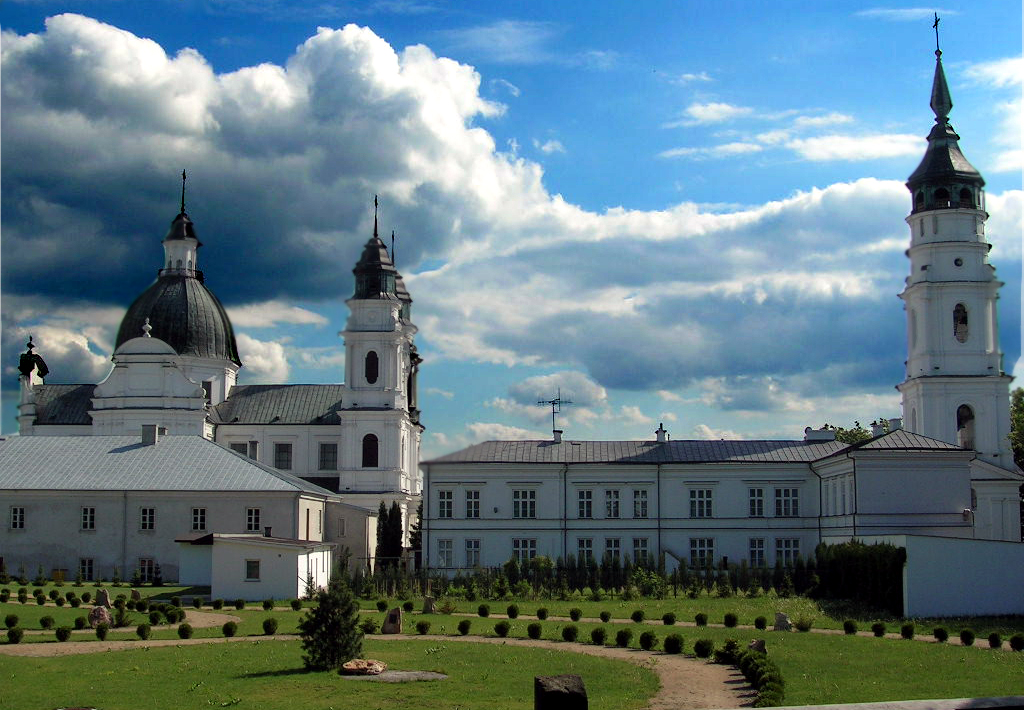
Belfry

The Basilica of the Birth of the Virgin Mary (Polish: Bazylika Narodzenia Najświętszej Maryi Panny, Ukrainian: Собор Різдва Пресвятої Богородиці) is a church and monastery complex of the Roman Catholic Church located in the Polish city of Chełm. The church and the courtyard of the basilica stand in the centre of Chełm on Chełm Hill (also called Cathedral Hill or Castle Hill). Over its history, the church has been Orthodox, Uniate and Roman Catholic. Surrounding the basilica's grounds is a city park and a cemetery.

== Description ==
The basilica is a former complex of Orthodox Church and Basilian Monastery. It was founded in the first half of the 13th century by Danylo Romanowych and served as an Orthodox Church and then as a Greek Catholic Church. The present church was founded in 1735-56 by the Greek Catholic Chełm bishop Philip Włodkowic and was built according to the plans of Paweł Fontana. It is a late baroque church built in the shape of a Latin cross, three-aisled basilica with a huge eight-part dome.

== History ==
A former Greek Catholic Cathedral and currently the Parish church, the Basilica of the Virgin Mary stands on the site of an Orthodox church of the same name, founded by Daniel Romanowicz in about 1260.

After a fire in 1640, it was rebuilt by bishop Metody Terlecki who introduced some small changes. As the years went by, the church needed to be enlarged and in 1711 bishop Józef Lewicki began repair works and built a transept. Unfortunately, it turned out that the work was done so unreliably that the building was close to collapse. The successor of Lewicki, bishop Felicjan Wołodkowicz considered the building's condition to be so bad that renovation was no longer an option and therefore commissioned its demolition. In 1735 the work began and a completely new, much bigger church was built, which was ready in 1756. That time, in curia sat on bishop Maksymilian Rylo, who finished the investment and founded rich decoration of sanctuary.

On 15 September 1765 the church was the place of the coronation of the marvellous painting of the Our Lady of Chełm. The painting was revered throughout the country because of its connection with the victory in the Battle of Berestechko that took place in 1651. The painting was taken by Russian forces in 1915 and is currently kept in Lutsk, Ukraine.

In 1802 the cathedral was consumed by fire but its walls stayed intact for a long time. Finally, in 1827 bishop Ferdynand Dąbrowa-Ciechanowski, at the expense of the treasury of the Kingdom of Poland, rebuilt the sanctuary. This rebuilt structure survived the Russian Empire's forcible conversion of the Chełm Eparchy to Eastern Orthodoxy in May 1875.

After the incursion of Austrian troops into Chełm (in 1915), the cathedral was used as an army warehouse. In May 1919 the Polish authorities donated the church to Catholic clergy. In May 1940 the German occupation authorities gave the cathedral to Ukrainians. In November, the same year, the Orthodox diocese was formed. Soon after the liberation of Poland, 24 August 1944, by the decision of the Polish Committee of National Liberation, Chełm's cathedral was given to the Catholic Church.

== Architecture ==
It is a late baroque church built in the shape of a Latin cross, and is a three-aisled basilica with a huge eight-part dome. The interior decoration is modest—the church was twice changed into a Russian Orthodox Church (1875–1918 and 1940–1944). In front of the basilica there is a detached belfry from 1878 which was rebuilt and heightened during the interwar period. Next to the basilica there is a Basilian Monastery founded in 1640-49 by Bishops Metodiusz Terlecki and Jakub Susza—the principal of the first Chełm secondary school. Nowadays it serves as a living quarter. In the main altar there is a copy of a painting of the Chełm Virgin Mary that went missing during the First World War and a late baroque silver antependium showing the king Jan Kazimierz paying tributes to the Chełm Virgin Mary after winning the battle at Beresteczko in 1651.

== Surroundings ==
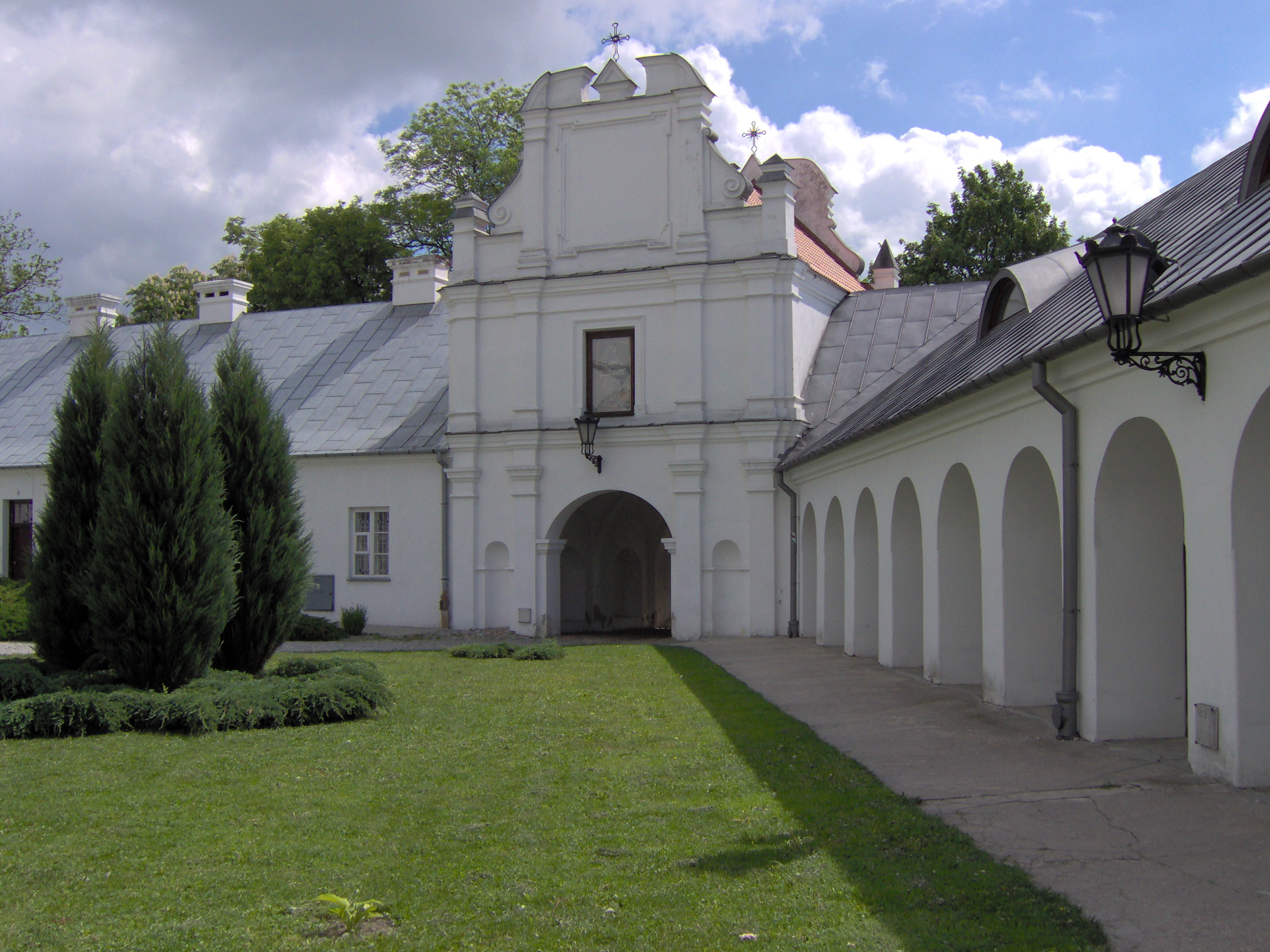
Uściłuska Gate

There are also many monuments surrounding the Basilica which are connected with the history of Chełm. The most famous are:

- Uściługska Gate ['Brama Uściłuska'] (built in the 17th-18th centuries)
- the Uniate Bishops Palace ['Pałac biskupów unickich'] (built in 1711)
- the Basilian Monastery ['Klasztor Bazylianów'] (1640–1649)
- the Building of the Orthodox Virgin Mary Brotherhood in Chełm ['Budynek Chełmskiego Prawosławnego Bractwa bogurodzicy'] (end of 19th century)
- the Belfry ['Dzwonnica'] (1878)

== Pilgrimage centre ==
The Festival of the Virgin Mary is celebrated at the basilica on every 7th and 8 September. Many groups of pilgrims arrive to Chełm to take part in the indulgence offered in relation to the festival.

== See also ==
- Chełm Chalk Tunnels
