= St. John the Evangelist Church, Chełm =

Orthodox church in Chełm, Poland

St. John the Evangelist Church
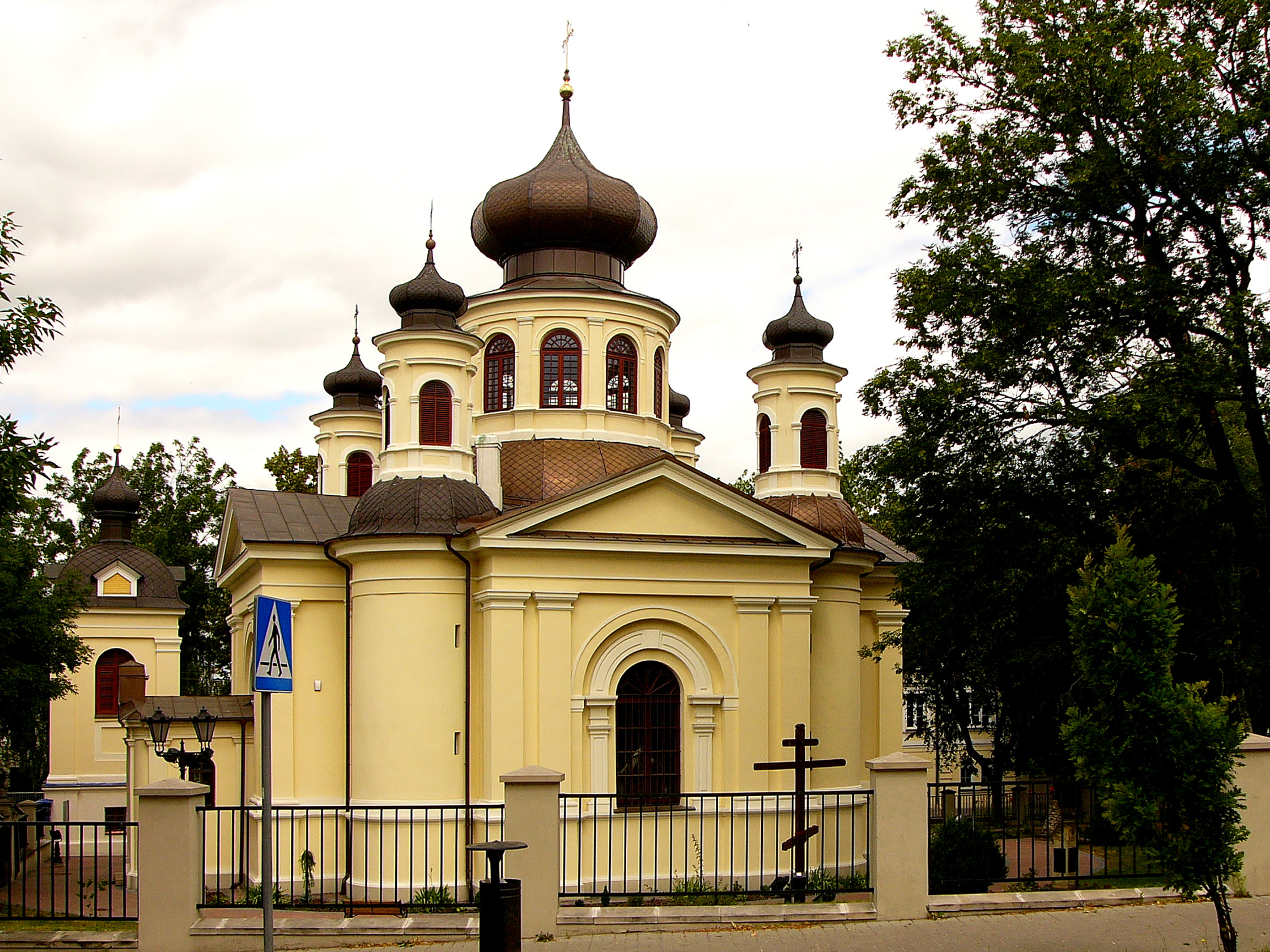
- St. John the Evangelist Church
- 51°08′03.6″N 23°28′26.6″E
- Location: Chełm
- Country: Poland
- Denomination: Eastern Orthodoxy
- Churchmanship: Polish Orthodox Church

History
- Status: active Orthodox church
- Dedication: John the Evangelist

Architecture
- Style: Classical Russian Revival
- Completed: 1852

Specifications
- Materials: brick

Administration
- Diocese: Diocese of Lublin and Chełm

The St. John the Evangelist Church is an Orthodox church serving as both a co-cathedral and parish church in Chełm, Poland. It belongs to the Chełm Deanery of the Diocese of Lublin and Chełm within the Polish Orthodox Church. It is the only active Orthodox church in Chełm.

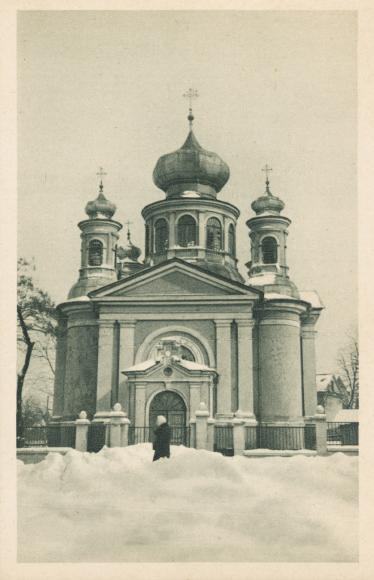
View of the church in 1919

Built between 1846 and 1852 with funds from the Russian government as a military church, it became a parish church in 1864 due to the growing Orthodox population of Russian officials and soldiers. After Poland regained independence, it was the only church in Chełm neither reclaimed by the Roman Catholic Church nor demolished. In 1928, it was granted the honorary status of a cathedral.

The building reflects an eclectic style, blending classicism with the official Russian Revival style. It accommodates between 350 and 400 worshippers and is located at the intersection of Jadwiga Młodowska, Mikołaj Kopernik, and Henryk Sienkiewicz streets. It was listed, along with its bell tower, in the register of historic monuments on 13 February 1967 under number A/193.

== History ==
=== Historical background ===
Orthodoxy is an autochthonous faith in Chełm. The first Orthodox churches may have existed in present-day Chełm as early as 1001. From 1246, Chełm was the seat of the Orthodox Eparchy. In 1596, Bishop Dionysius Zbyruyskyy accepted the Union of Brest, converting the Orthodox eparchy into the Greek Catholic Eparchy of Chełm–Belz. Chełm's Orthodox initially resisted, but all parishes except the St. Onuphrius Monastery in Jabłeczna eventually adopted the union. Orthodox faithful reappeared in Chełm after its incorporation into Russia during the partitions of Poland.

=== Construction ===
The church was built from 1846 to 1852 at the expense of the Russian state as a military church. The Church Construction Committee, including Chełm mayor Leon Karpiński, began work on 25 July 1846, with Jan Lasota as construction supervisor. The cornerstone was laid on 9 June 1846. Funding came from the church-building fund under the Main Commission of Internal and Spiritual Affairs. The initial cost was estimated at 126,518 PLN, later reduced to 107 PLN for construction, with an additional 89 PLN for furnishings, including 14 for the iconostasis.

The design was by Ludwik Radziszewski. Contributors included Wincenty Łańcucki (main construction), Karol Kubik (carpentry), and Herszek Wajsblach and Herszek Blachman (metalwork). Wall paintings were by Bonawentura Dąbrowski. The iconostasis was commissioned from Warsaw artist Fryderyk Blickle, completed by his wife after his death. Core construction finished in 1849, with finishing work and the freestanding bell tower completed over the next few years. The church was dedicated on 13 June 1852 by Russian military chaplain Protopriest Pogonialov. It accommodates between 350 and 400 worshippers.

=== Operation in the Russian Empire ===
Initially a military parish church, it was served by chaplains from various Russian army units without a permanent rector. Chaplain Pogonialov was notably responsible for its upkeep. During periods without troops, such as the January Uprising, services ceased. Chełm had few Orthodox residents then, mostly Greek Catholics. The church's proximity to the Greek Catholic cathedral signaled Tsarist intentions toward Eastern Catholics, hoping its appearance and rich furnishings would attract them to Orthodoxy.

By the 1860s, the building's condition necessitated a major renovation due to its location in a depression where water from nearby hills caused wall cracks and floor rot. From 1864 to 1867, the floor was replaced, cracks repaired, the pulpit removed (its canopy relocated to the chancel), and north and south facade windows enlarged, eliminating original side entrances. The growing Orthodox population prompted its conversion to a civilian parish under the Eparchy of Warsaw and Novogeorgievsk in 1864, leading to the construction of a parish house nearby. Jakow Kraszanowski was appointed the first rector in 1864.

On an uncertain date in 1866, Mykhailo Hrushevsky was baptized in the church or its rectory.

=== Operation in independent Poland ===
After Poland's independence, Chełm's Orthodox community lost nearly all its churches. Former Catholic or Greek Catholic churches repurposed as Orthodox were reclaimed by the Latin Church, while three purpose-built Orthodox churches (Saints Cyril and Methodius Church, Saints Alexius, Peter, Jonah, and Philip Church, and the unfinished Saint Paraskeva Church) were demolished. St. John the Evangelist Church remained the sole Orthodox church in use. It housed a copy of the Chełm Icon of the Mother of God (the original was taken to Russia during the mass exile) and hosted its annual celebrations.

On 19 May 1928, Metropolitan of Warsaw and all Poland Dionysius Waledyński designated it a co-cathedral, symbolically honoring Chełm's history as an Orthodox eparchy seat (the Moscow Patriarchate's Chełm Eparchy was dissolved by Polish authorities in 1923).

In 1936, the parish had 5,000 members, plus many Orthodox soldiers and 900 students. The church's size proved inadequate, prompting expansion plans. Efforts began in 1936, with a design approved in 1937 by the metropolitan and Lublin voivode. On 5 June 1938, the cornerstone was laid and foundations poured, but World War II halted progress. Post-war attempts to resume failed, and its 1967 heritage listing precluded further expansion. It was renovated in 1949, and in 1961, the unused foundations were repurposed for a new fence.

A fire broke out in 1988 but was contained.

Renovations occurred in 1990, with the iconostasis conserved from 1991 to 1993. Since 1999, the church has been illuminated. In 2011, EU funds supported another renovation, begun in 2003 due to structural issues from its marshy site.

On 21 September 2021, a copy of the Chełm Icon of the Mother of God, painted on Mount Athos with a relic of the Virgin's Holy Belt, was installed.

== Architecture ==
=== Structure ===
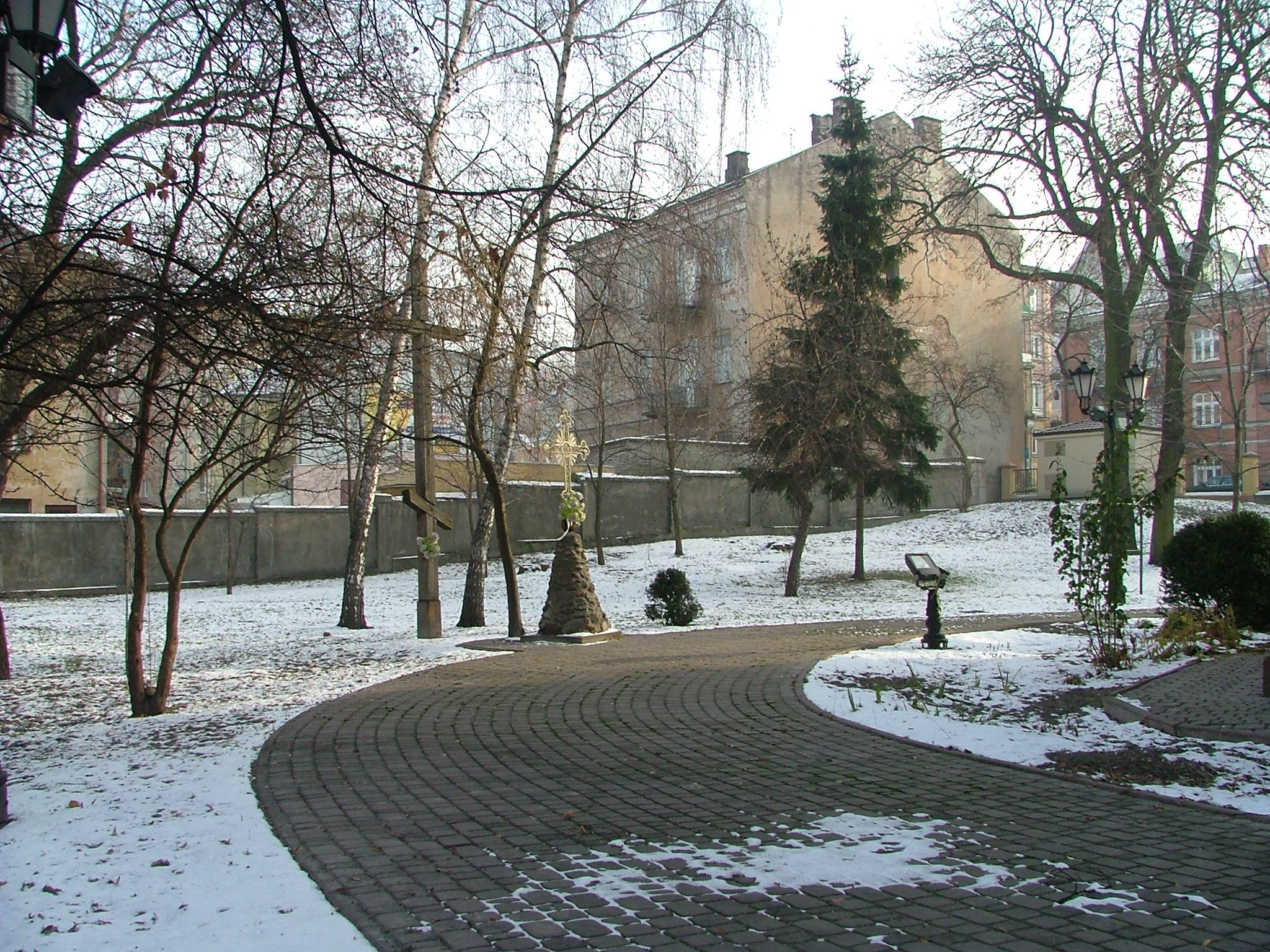
Church surroundings

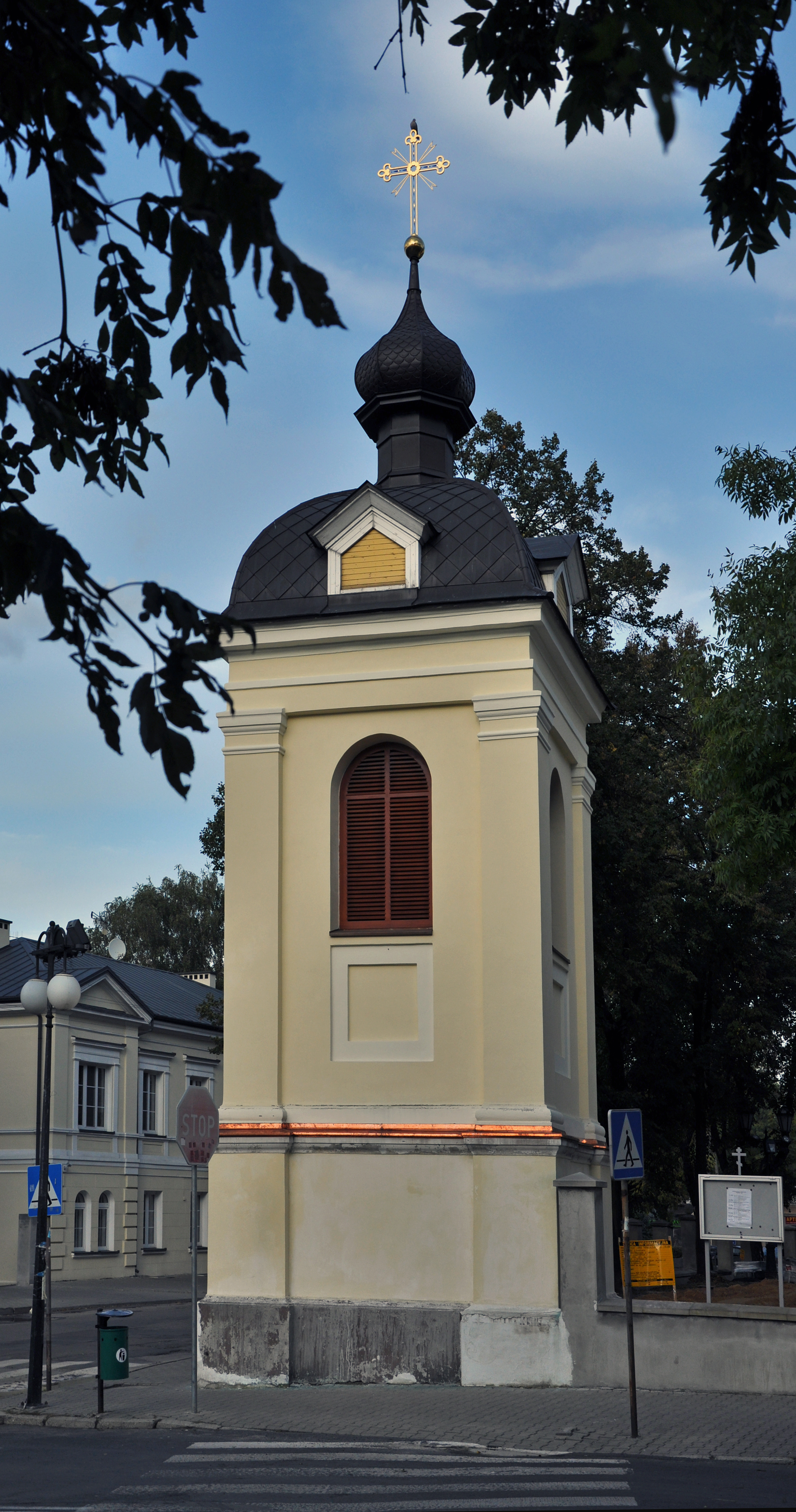
Bell tower

The church combines classicism and Russian Revival style. Built of brick and plastered, it follows a Greek cross plan and is oriented. Its side facades resemble aediculae on a plinth, with pairs of Tuscan pilasters topped by triangular pediments. North and south facade windows are semicircular, adorned with pilasters and arcaded arches, while the chancel's outer window is circular. The western facade features a church porch matching the width of the facade's arcaded niche, decorated with Tuscan pilasters and crowned by a cross. Semicircular windows flank the church porch, with the main entrance framed by a portal. Four smaller turrets with onion domes on lanterns mark the cross arms, and a larger dome rises over the central nave on a cylindrical roof lantern with arcaded windows and eight pilasters.

The bell tower, northwest of the church, mirrors its style across two stories. The lower story forms a plinth, while the upper, with corner pilasters, features arcaded lightwells and panels, topped by an entablature. Lacking a basement (only a 150 cm deep secondary well exists below), the ground floor has a brick barrel vault, with welded steel stairs to the upper level. The upper story supports a wooden bell-hanging frame under a four-pitched, copper-clad dome with a roof lantern and a tented roof. Each roof pitch has a mock dormer. It houses four bells: three from 1866 and one from 1963.

=== Interior ===
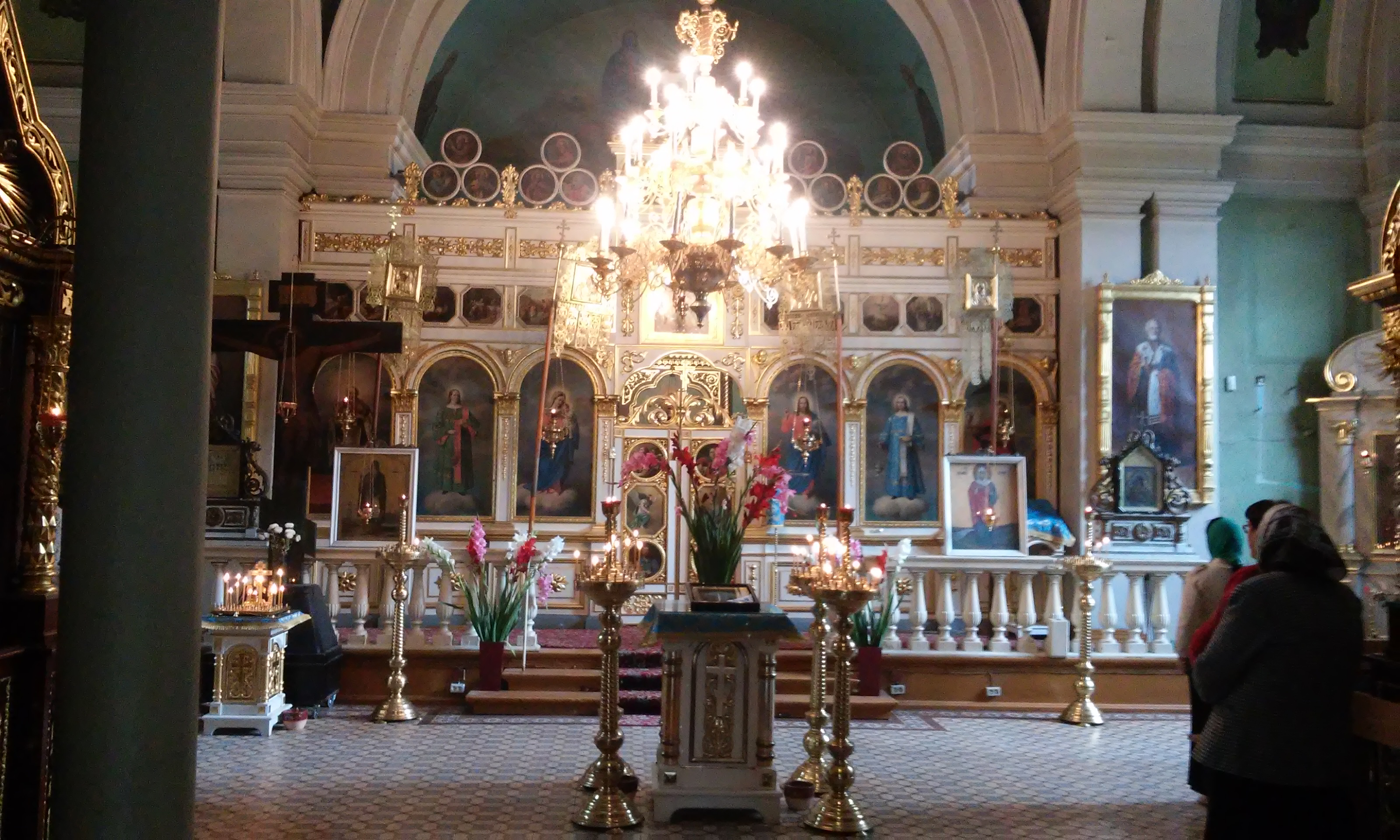
Church interior

The church features a three-tiered iconostasis. Its furnishings include utensils and icons from defunct interwar Orthodox churches in Chełm, such as icons of St. Nicholas and St. Leontius from the St. Leontius Church in Chełm near the pre-1915 Orthodox Seminary in Chełm, and two from the St. George Church in Strzelce, destroyed in 1938 during the Polonization-Revindication Action of 1938. Venerated copies of miraculous icons of the Mother of God – Chełm and Pochayiv – and relics of the True Cross are also present.

A banner of the Brotherhood of the Theotokos, founded in 1852 and active until World War II, survives.

The church porch contains two plaques commemorating 800 years since Daniel Romanowicz's birth and the 55th anniversary of Operation Vistula.
