= Magdalena Gaj =

Polish state official (born 1974)

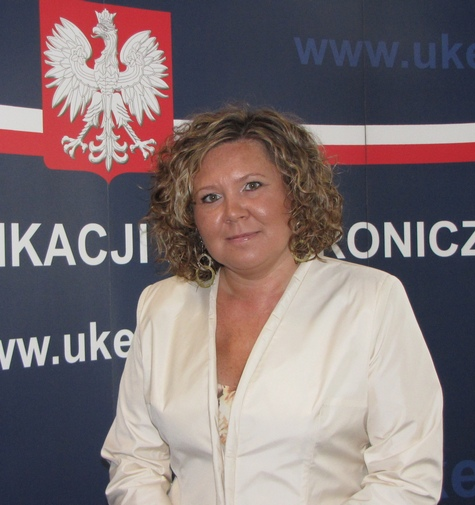

President of the Office of Electronic Communications
- Incumbent
- Assumed office 1 February 2012
- Preceded by: Anna Streżyńska

Personal details
- Born: Magdalena Gaj; 25 March 1974 (age 52) Chełm, Poland
- Children: Gabriela (born 2004)
- Education: Maria Curie-Skłodowska University in Lublin

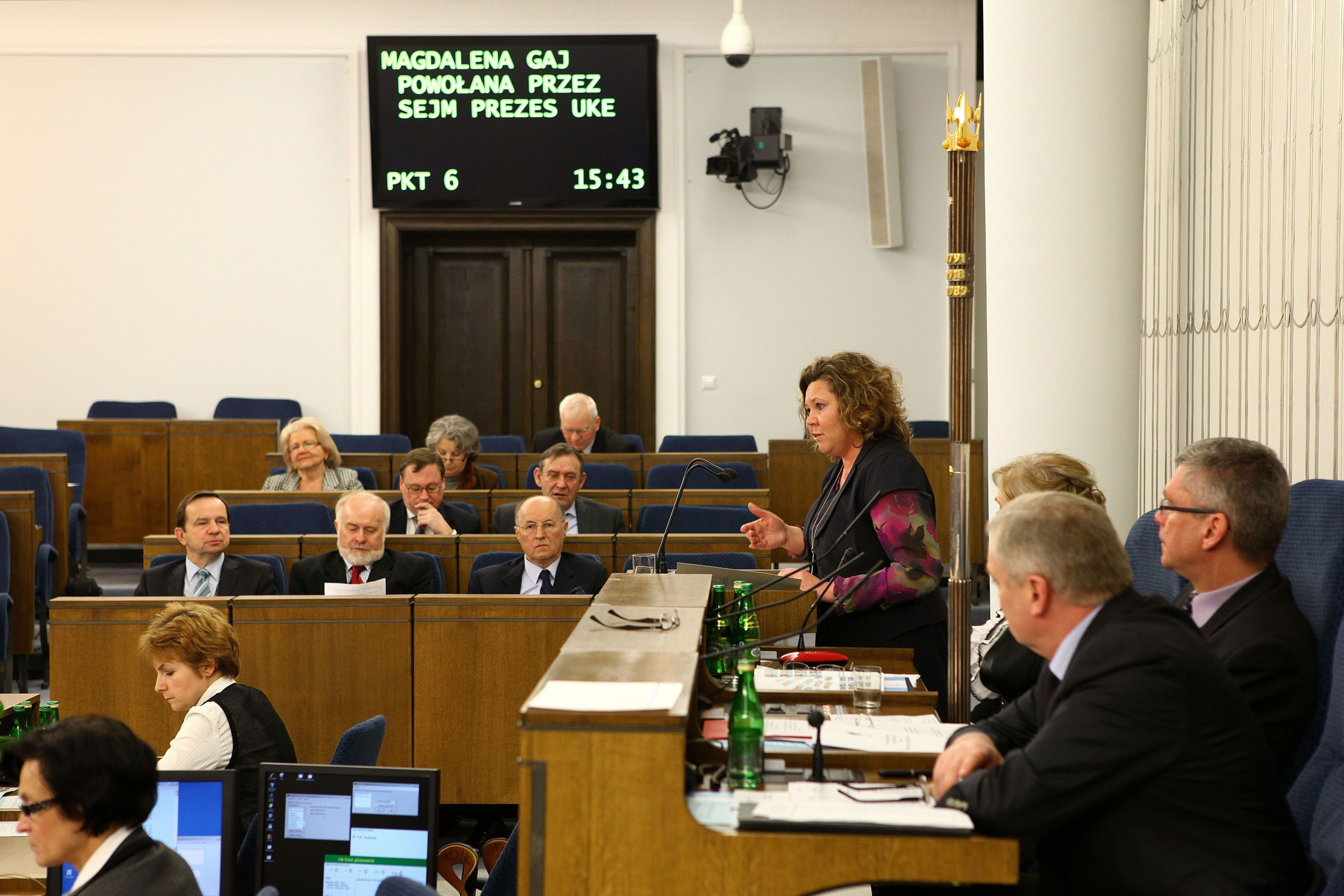
Magdalena Gaj speaking in the Polish Senate (2012)

Magdalena Gaj (born 25 March 1974 in Chełm) is a Polish state official. Since 2012, she has been President of the Office of Electronic Communications (UKE).

== Early life and education ==
Gaj completed her studies at the Faculty of Law and Administration of the Maria Curie-Skłodowska University in Lublin in 1998. Between 1998 and 2001 she studied for qualifications as a legal counsel while working for a law firm.

== Career ==
In 2001 she took up a position in the Legal Department of the then Office of Telecommunications. In 2005 she was appointed the Director of Legal Department in the renamed Office of Electronic Communications (UKE), advising the departmental president on telecommunications, postal, administrative, civil and European law issues. She was actively involved in drafting resolutions taken by the regulator.

In 2009, Gaj became the Undersecretary of State in the Ministry of Infrastructure, where she was responsible for telecommunications and postal issues. Her work within the government was focused primarily on amendments to the law which brought it in compliance with the European law and on introducing provisions which facilitate the development of telecommunications services and consumer protection. She was also responsible for the switchover to digital television. Under her leadership the Plan for Digital TV Implementation in Poland, and subsequently the Act on Digital Terrestrial TV Implementation were prepared and adopted by the Council of Ministers. Gaj also contributed to the facilitation of telephone number transfer between exchanges, and introduced legislation related to fraudulent SMS lotteries. She also directed a task force on "Digital Poland", facilitating broadband take-up.

Gaj also initiated a Broadband Round Table in Poland, a platform for the exchange of knowledge and information between the government, local authorities and telecommunications undertakings. She chaired the Round Table talks until her appointment as head of the regulatory authority. Her contributions to this initiative included a memorandum on cooperation between the government, local authorities and telecommunications undertakings in favour of telecommunications infrastructure roll-out in Poland.

While Undersecretary of State in the Ministry of Infrastructure, an Act on supporting the development of telecommunications networks and services (the so-called "mega-law") was prepared and adopted. The act facilitated investment in telecommunications infrastructure by the companies and local governments. The act also enhanced the process of spending EU funds designed for extension of the internet network.

Gaj is one of the originators to the concept of "digital lamplighters", internet instructors combatting "digital exclusion".

Gaj concluded agreements in 2011 whereby Poland became a member of the International Telecommunication Union (ITU) Council and helped conclude international agreements on cross-border coordination in the 800 MHz band accelerated.

During the Polish Presidency of the Council of the European Union, she was in charge of Council telecommunications work. Her team negotiated a compromise version of the first Radio Spectrum Policy Programme (RSPP) with the European Parliament, harmonizing the frequencies in the 800 MHz band on an EU-wide scale for the purposes of electronic communications services and broadband Internet access.

In November 2011, Gaj was appointed Undersecretary of State at the Ministry of Administration and Digitization. In early 2012 Gaj was nominated an official candidate for the post of the President of the Office of Electronic Communications. On 27 January 2012, her candidature was approved by the Sejm, and on 1 February 2012 by the Polish Senate. On 24 April 2012, she was elected chair of the board of the Intersputnik International Organization of Space Communications for a one-year term.

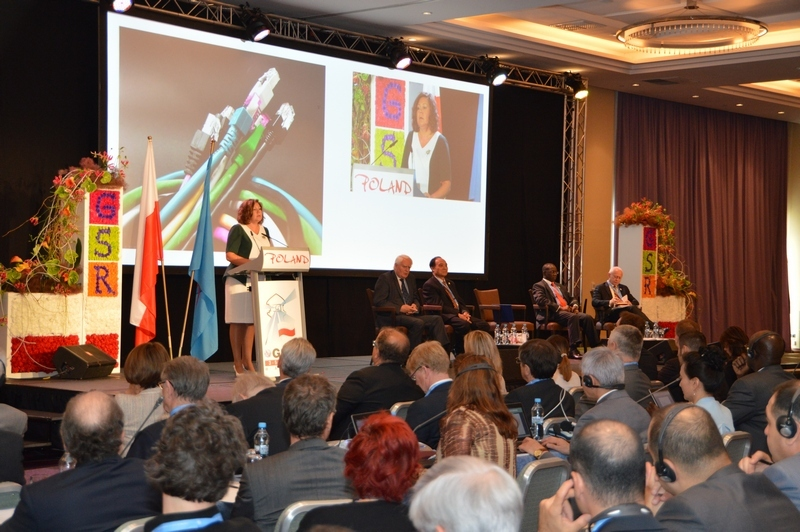
The GSR13 opening ceremony chaired by Gaj as the President of the UKE

Gaj chaired the Global Symposium for Regulators held in Warsaw between 3 and 5 July 2013. It was organized by the International Telecommunication Union (ITU) in collaboration with the Polish the Ministry of Administration and Digitalization and the Office of Electronic Communications (UKE).

== See also ==
- Poland
- Ministry of Administration and Digitization (Poland)
- Ministry of Infrastructure (Poland)
- International Telecommunication Union
