= AZS Chełm =

Meblotap AZS Chełm was a Polish women's basketball team based in Chełm that played in the Sharp Torell Basket Liga.

Meblotap AZS Chełm has won the 7th place in the Sharp Torell Basket Liga 2003–2004 season.
