= Solomon Simon =

Belarusian-American Jewish author and educator

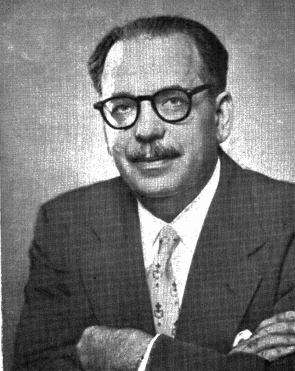
- Born: Shlomo Shimonovich; 1895; Kalinkavichy, Minsk Governorate, Russian Empire
- Died: 1970 (aged 74–75); Miami Beach, Florida
- Education: New York University
- Occupation: Jewish writer
- Movement: Yiddishism

Solomon Simon (1895—November 8, 1970) was a Jewish author and educator. He published over thirty books, in Yiddish and English, notably his children's books The Wandering Beggar, The Wise Men of Helm, and More Wise Men of Helm. He was also a leading figure of the Sholem Aleichem Folk Institute, a Jewish cultural organization that operated Yiddish secular schools for children.

== Biography ==
Simon was born Shlomo Shimonovich in the summer of 1895 in what is now Belarus, in an isolated Jewish shtetl that had some hundreds of Jewish families, located near the Minsk swamps and a Russian railway hub called Kalinkavichy. His childhood, early years, and difficult experiences growing up in Czarist Russia, are vividly described in his two-volume autobiography, which has been translated from Yiddish into English: My Jewish Roots (1954) and In The Thicket (1963). His father, Eruchim Ben-Zion, was a simple shoemaker. The poverty stricken family lived in a small hut where his mother, Mere (Lifschitz), struggled to help make ends meet by baking bagels and rolls.

Shimonovich was the fourth of eight children and, unlike the others, suffered from rickets. As a result, he was forced to crawl about, unable to walk, until he was nearly six. The handicap led to a startlingly imaginative inner life as a child that was later reflected in many of his writings. At age 13 he was singled out for assignment to a Yeshiva in Kremenchuk, and then continued his advanced training at several additional Yeshivas in Poland. His Rabbinical studies were interrupted by his conscription into the Czarist army. Like so many other Jewish emigrants, he fled to America. In 1913 he arrived in New York City, penniless and not knowing a word of English.

The transition from the world of the shtetl changed him forever. He anglicized his name to Solomon Simon' (Shlomo Simon in Yiddish), worked initially as a house painter, served in the U.S. Army in 1918, became a U.S. citizen, graduated from Dental College at New York University (1924), and commenced practicing dentistry. His real love, however, was writing, and from the 1920s on he devoted himself to it, while resorting to dentistry in order to earn a living and support his wife, Lena, and three children, David, Judith (Judith Simon Bloch) and Miriam.

Although he had become fully secular, he felt it essential to assure the survival of Jewish values, culture and traditions in the new generation of Jews growing up in America. To that end, he became a devoted "yiddishist," viewing the Yiddish language as the singular instrument that could succeed in perpetuating Jewish ideals among secular Jews and their children. He became active in the Sholem Aleichem Folk Institute based in New York City, a secular Jewish organization focused on maintaining evening children's schools for teaching Yiddish, as well as Jewish culture and history. He served as President of the institute from 1939 to 1943, 1945–49 and 1952–3; he also played an active role in its Yiddish summer camp, Camp Boiberik, as well as its Yiddish magazine for children and its Yiddish publishing arm.

Toward the end of his life he perceived that his Yiddish language crusade was not working out with the new generation of American Jews. The institute's schools languished and the numbers of his Yiddish readers declined. His religious beliefs also changed. He once again described himself as a believer, but only in his own unorthodox theistic style, which in many ways mirrored the revisionist proposals of Rabbi Mordecai Kaplan. For his last 28 years, until his death in 1970, he was teaching a group of devoted adult followers regarding the application of the Scriptures and Talmud to modern Jewish life.

In 1971 the noted Yiddish linguist, Maurice Samuel, gratefully acknowledged the help he had received from the late Dr. Solomon Simon, an "outstanding scholar ...whose command of Bible, Talmud and Jewish-Yiddish tradition helped me through many knotty passages.

== Writings ==
With the furtherance of his "Yiddishist" goal in mind, his early works were written in Yiddish for children, in a series of books focused on Jewish legends and themes, such as: "Shmerl Nar" (later translated as The Wandering Beggar), about a Jewish simpleton accomplishing accidental "miracles" as he wandered about Russian towns; and "Helden Fun Khelm" (later translated as The Wise Men of Helm and supplemented by More Wise Men of Helm), about a mythical town of Jewish fools and their comic foolishness.

Paradoxically it is these English translations of his early books, first published in English in the 1940s, that have remained in print. They received critical acclaim when they appeared in English. The New York Times described The Wise Men of Helm as "a delightful little book" and "almost a classic of its kind" (NY Times 2/24/48). Earlier the Times had commented favorably on The Wandering Beggar: "Artfully shaped…these stories deserve to be known by readers of all faiths" (NY Times 18 October 1942).

As for his Yiddish books, they too were popular at the time they first appeared. They were published and distributed in Argentina – with its substantial Yiddish-speaking readers – as well as in the United States, Mexico and Canada. In recognition of his literary achievements, he received Mexico's Kessel award and Argentina's Mordecai Stoller award.

In later years, his Yiddish writings turned to serious topics. Thus "Medines Isroel Un Erets Israel" (1950) set forth the ethical conflict between the dual concept of Israel as a nation state and as a religious home; "In De Teg Fun De Ershter Nevyim" (1959) focused on the ethical demands of the early prophets; "Oyf Eigene Drokhim" (1962) described his own searching path in Yiddish life; and "Emune Fun a Dor" (1970), published in the year he died, set forth his last legacy. Along with a number of his early Yiddish children stories, none of these later works have as yet been translated.

His final years were devoted to a special project dear to his heart: a revised English translation of the early Jewish Scriptures, accompanied by Talmudic footnotes and Teacher's Resource Books that amplified and explained the Talmudic sources. These – which he co-authored – were the only books originally written by him in English: The Rabbi's Bible Vol. 1: Torah (1966); Volume Two: Early Prophets (1969); and Volume Three:: The Later Prophets (1974) (published posthumously). Like his early children's books in English, these too are still in print today.

"Kluge Hent" (Clever Hands) was his first and only novel. It was published by his widow, Lena, in 1973 in response to what she describes as his dying wish that it be printed at last in book form. It has only now been translated into English as "The Boy With The Golden Hands". It is an adventure tale that focuses on Jewish life in Moravia in the early 19th century.

== Published works ==
=== Children's Stories In Yiddish ===
- Leyvik's Golem (Levik's Golem) (Yidish Leben 1927)
- Shmerl Nar (Shmerl the Fool, translated as The Wandering Beggar) (Farlage Matones 1931)
- Dos kluge shnayderl (The Clever Little Tailor)(Farlag Matones 1933)
- Myses Fun Agodete (Stories from the Aggadah)(co-authored with Chaim Shoys, 1936)
- H. Leyviks kinderyorn (Childhood Years of H. Levik) (Niye Yidishe Shul, Vilna, 1938)
- Roberts Ventures (Robert's Adventures)(Farlag Matones 1938)
- Khumesh Far Kinder (Khumesh for Children)(Farlag Matones 1940)
- Di Helden fun Khelm (the Heroes of Chełm, translated as The Wise Men of Helm) (Farlag Matones 1942)
- Kinder yorn fun Yidishe shreiber (Childhood Years of Jewish Writers)(Farlag Matones; Vol. 1 1936; Vol. 2, 1945)
- Yohoshua un Shoftim far Kinder (Joshua and Judges for Children) (Farlag Matones 1952)
- Hakhomim, akshonin un naronim (The Wise, The Stubborn, and Fools)(Alter Rozental Fund, Buenos Aires, 1954)

=== Children's Stories In English ===
- The Wandering Beggar (Behrman House 1942)
- The Wise Men of Helm (Behrman House 1945)
- More Wise Men of Helm (Behrman House 1965)
- The Clever Little Tailor (Kinder-Loshn Publications 2021)

=== French translation ===
- Chelm Les heroes de la betise (Helm - Heroes of Foolishness) (Editions L'Harmattano 1987)

=== Ethical, Philosophical and Religious Works In Yiddish ===
- In de teg fun di nevi'im (In the Days of the Prophets) (Farlag Matones 1947)
- Yidn tsvishn felker (Jews Among Nations) (Yidishe Etishe Gezelshaft, 1949)
- In de Teg fun de Ershte Nevyem (In the Days of the Early Prophets) (Koyim, Buenos Aires, 1950)
- Medinas Yi'sroel un Erets Yi'sroel (The Kingdom of Israel and The Land of Israel) (Undzer Bukh, Buenos Aires, 1950)
- Amolike Yidn (Old Time Jews) (Yidbukh, Buenos Aires, 1952)
- Tokh-Yiddishkayt (The Essence of Jewish-ness) (Yidbukh, Buenos Aires, 1954)
- Der goyrl fun undzere Yidishistishe shuln (The Fate of Our Yiddishist Schools)(Fryer Arbeter Shtyme 1956)
- Dos meglekhe un ummeglekhe (The Possible and Impossible) (Almanakh Yidish 1961)
- Oyf eygene drokhim (On My Own Paths) (Yidbukh, Argentina, 1962)
- Emune fun a dor (The Heritage of a Generation) (Farlag Matones 1970)
- Hayim Nakhman Bialik (Chaim Nachman Byalik) (Jewish School Publishing House, Montreal, 1973)

=== The Bible In English (co-authored) ===
- The Rabbi's Bible Vol.1: Torah (co-authored with Morrison David Beal)(Behrman House 1966)
- The Rabbi's Bible Vol. 2: Early Prophets (co-authored with Morrison David Beal)(Behrman House 1969)
- The Rabbi's Bible Vol. 3: The Later Prophets (co-authored with Abraham Rothberg) (Behrman House 1974)
- Teacher's Resource for Vol. 1 (Behrman House 1966)
- Teacher's Resource for Vol. 2 (Behrman House 1969)

=== Novel ===
- Kluge Hent (Farlag Tsiko1973)

=== Autobiography (in Yiddish and English translation) ===
- Vortslen (Roots) (Yidbukh, Buenos Aires, 1956) (received Argentina's Mordecai Stoller Prize)
- Tsvygen (Branches) (Yidbukh, Buenos Aires, 1960)
- My Jewish Roots (Jewish Publication Society 1954)
- In the Thicket (Jewish Publication Society 1963)
