= Chełm =

City in Lublin Voivodeship, Poland

- City county
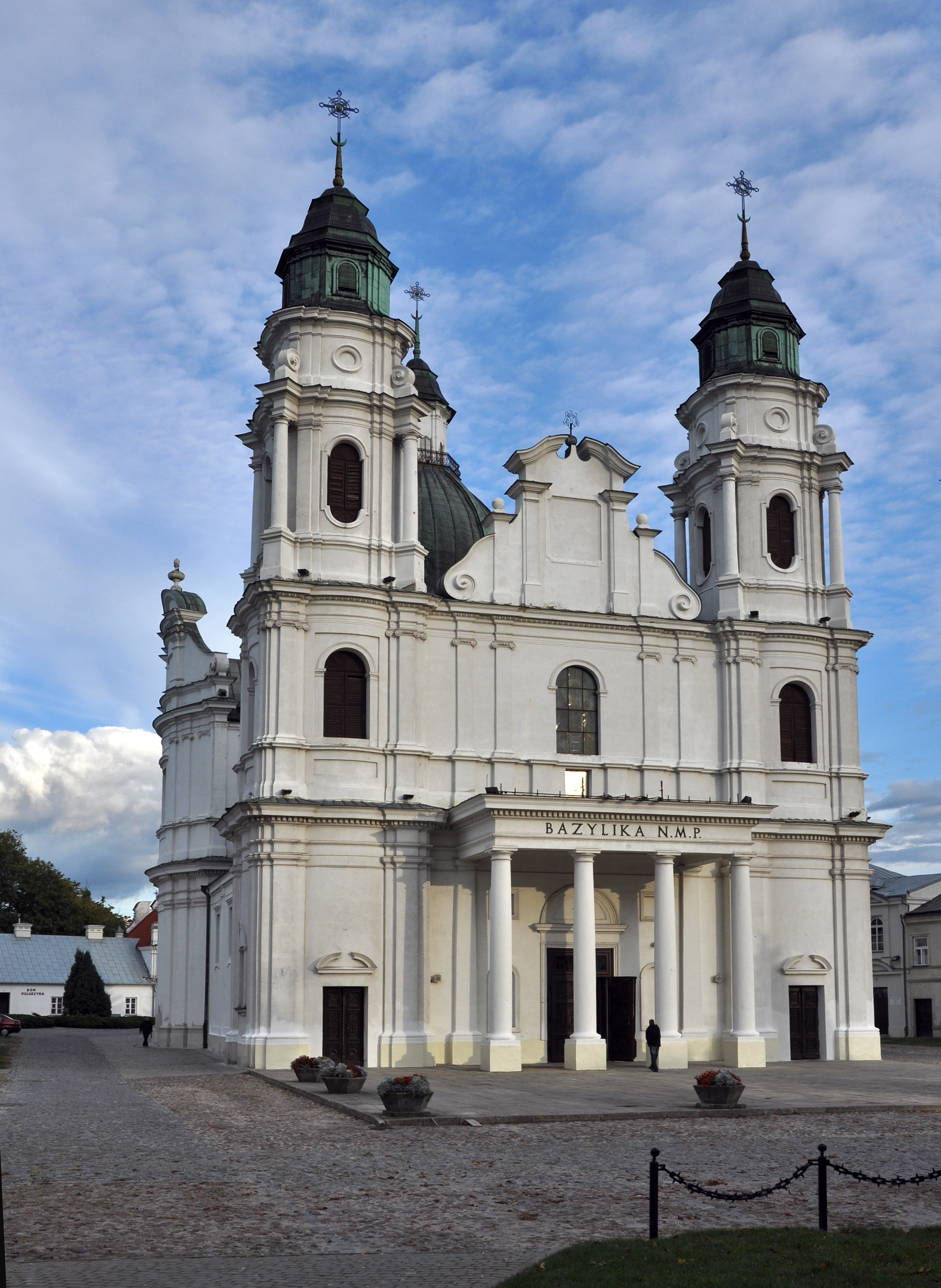
- Basilica of the Birth of the Virgin Mary

- Flag Coat of arms

- Location within Poland
- Coordinates: 51°07′56″N 23°28′40″E
- Country: Poland
- Voivodeship: Lublin
- County: City County
- Established: 10th century
- City rights: 1235

Government
  - City mayor: Jakub Banaszek (OdNowa RP)

Area
  - Total: 35.28 km^{2} (13.62 sq mi)
- Highest elevation: 153 m (502 ft)
- Lowest elevation: 80 m (260 ft)

Population (31 December 2021)
  - Total: 60,231
  - Density: 1,707/km^{2} (4,420/sq mi)
- Time zone: UTC+1 (CET)
  - Summer (DST): UTC+2 (CEST)
- Postal code: 22-100 to 22-118
- Area code: +48 082
- Car plates: LC
- Website: www.chelm.pl

Chełm (Note: Polish: [xɛwm]; Ukrainian: Холм, romanized: Kholm; Yiddish: כעלם, romanized: Khelm) is a city in eastern Poland in the Lublin Voivodeship with 60,231 inhabitants as of December 2021. It is located to the south-east of Lublin, north of Zamość and south of Biała Podlaska, some 25 kilometres (16 miles) from the border with Ukraine. The Chełm–Kovel railway (both 1435 mm and 1520 mm gauge) links the city to Kovel, and represents the longest standard-gauge railway connecting Ukraine to the rest of Europe.

The city is of mostly industrial character, though it also features numerous notable historical monuments and tourist attractions in the Old Town. Chełm is a multiple (former) bishopric. In the third quarter of the 13th century, it was the capital of the Kingdom of Galicia–Volhynia. Following the Galicia–Volhynia Wars of succession, in the mid-14th century, the town became part of the Kingdom of Poland. Chełm was once a multicultural and religious centre populated by Catholics, Eastern Orthodox Christians, Protestants and Jews. The Jewish population was decimated in World War II, going from 15,000 Jewish inhabitants to mere dozens. From 1975 to 1998 it was the capital of the Chełm Voivodeship. The city's landmarks are the Castle Hill with the Basilica of the Birth of the Virgin Mary and the unique Chełm Chalk Tunnels spanning some 15 kilometres (9 mi) of underground routes.

== Etymology ==
The etymology of the name is unclear, though most scholars derive it from the Proto-Slavic word xъlmъ denoting a hill, in reference to the Wysoka Górka fortified settlement. The town's centre is located on a hill called góra chełmska. However, it is also theorized that the name is derived from some Celtic root.

== History ==
The first traces of settlement in the area of modern Chełm date back to at the least 9th century. The following century, a fortified town (gord) was created and initially served as a centre of pagan worship. In 981 the town, then inhabited by the Slavic tribe of Buzhans, was annexed from Poland by the Kievan Rus', along with the surrounding Cherven Towns. According to a local legend, Vladimir the Great built the first stone castle there in 1001. Following the Polish capture of Kiev in 1018, the region returned to Poland before it fell back to Kievan rule in 1031.

In 1235, Daniel of Galicia granted the town a city charter and moved the capital of his domain in 1241–1272 after destruction of Halych by the Mongols in 1240–1241. Daniel also built a new castle atop the hill in 1237, one of the few Ruthenian castles that withstood Mongol attacks, and established an Orthodox eparchy (diocese) centered at the Basilica of the Birth of the Virgin Mary. According to a contemporary chronicle, under Daniel's rule the city was settled by migrants of various ethnicities, including Germans, Ruthenians and Poles, and housed many refugees fleeing from Tatar raids. Until the 14th century, the town developed as part of Kingdom of Galicia–Volhynia and then as part of the short-lived Princedom of Chełm and Belz (see Duchy of Belz). In 1366, king Casimir III the Great of Poland took control of the region after his victory in the Galicia–Volhynia Wars. On 4 January 1392, the town was relocated and granted rights under Magdeburg Law, with vast internal autonomy and the town saw an influx of Polish and other Catholic settlers.

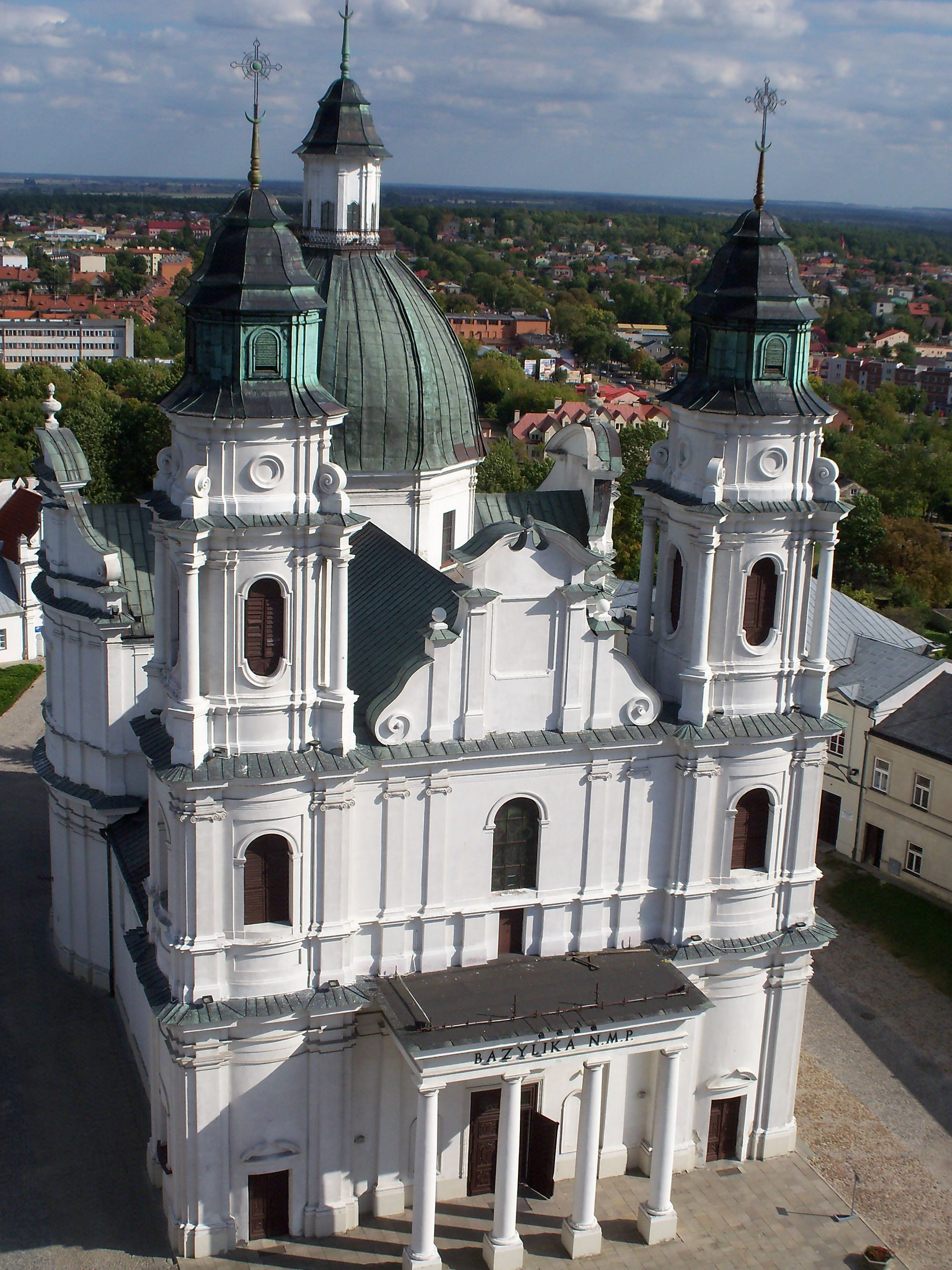
Baroque Basilica of the Birth of the Virgin Mary

The Latin Church Diocese of Chełm was created in 1359, but its seat was moved to Krasnystaw after 1480. Renamed as the Diocese of Chełm–Lublin in 1790, it was suppressed in 1805, but since 2005 Chełm has been nominally restored and listed by the Catholic Church as a Latin titular bishopric.

The Eastern Orthodox bishopric entered communion with the see of Rome in the late 16th century as Ukrainian Catholic Eparchy of Chełm–Bełz, retaining its Byzantine Rite, but in 1867 it became part of the imperial Russian Orthodox Church, and is now the Archdiocese of Lublin and Chełm of the Polish Orthodox Church.

The town was the capital of the historical region of the Land of Chełm, administratively a part of the Ruthenian Voivodeship in the Lesser Poland Province of the Kingdom of Poland. The city prospered in the 15th and 16th centuries. It was then that The Golem of Chełm by Rabbi Elijah Ba'al Shem of Chelm became famous, but the city declined in the 17th century due to the wars which ravaged Poland. In the 18th century, the situation in eastern Poland stabilized and the town started to slowly recover from the damages suffered during the Swedish Deluge and the Khmelnytsky uprising. It attracted a number of new settlers from all parts of Poland, including people of Catholic, Orthodox, and Jewish faiths. In 1794, the Chełm Voivodeship was established. Chełm was one of the first towns to join the Kościuszko's Uprising later that year. In the Battle of Chełm of 8 June 1794, the forces of Gen. Józef Zajączek were defeated by the Russians under Valerian Zubov and Boris Lacy, and the town was yet again sacked by the invading armies. The following year, as a result of the Third Partition of Poland, the town was annexed by Austria.

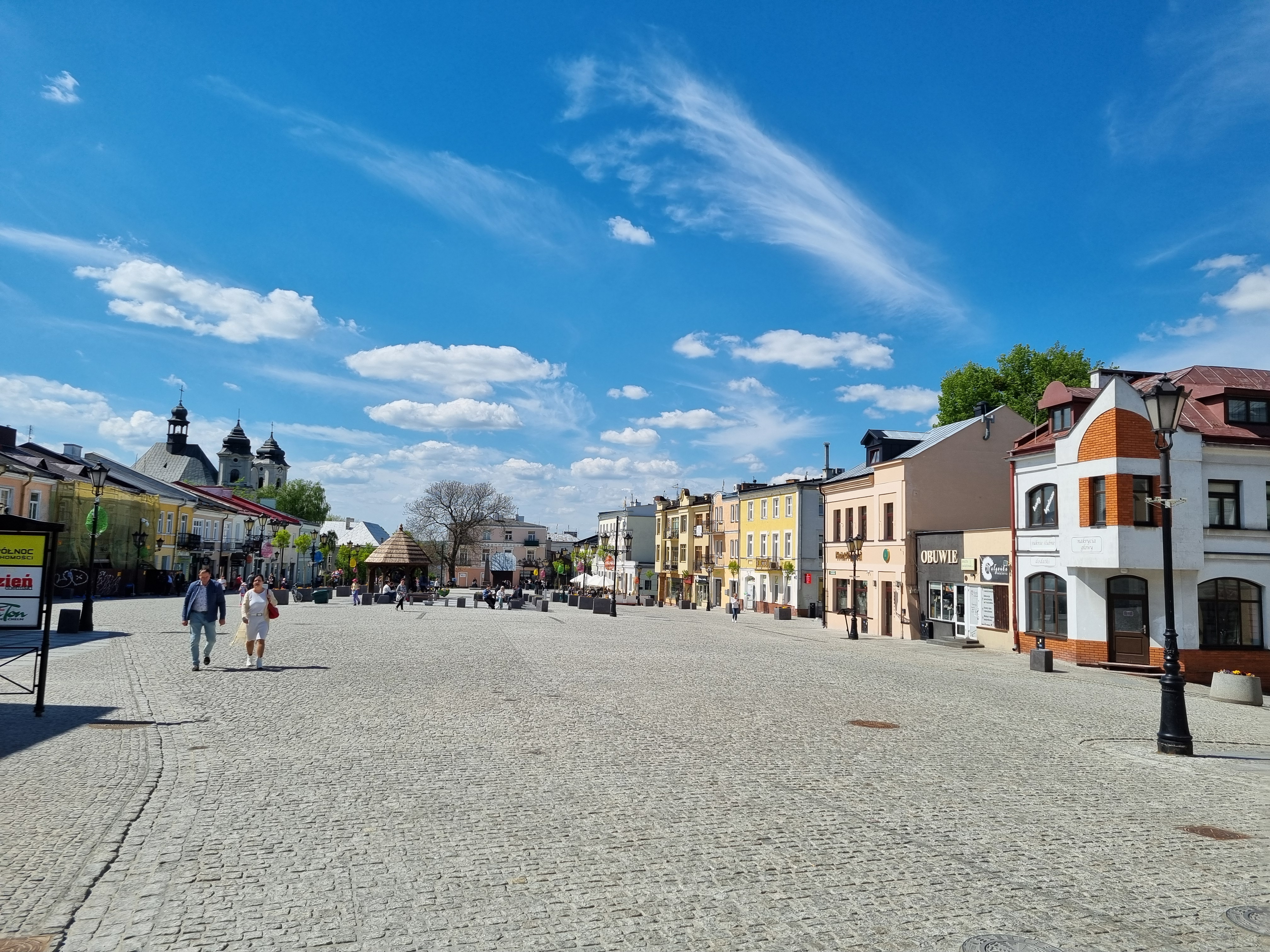
Market square, 2024

=== Age of partitions ===
During the Napoleonic Wars in 1809, as a result of the Polish–Austrian War, the town was briefly part of the Duchy of Warsaw. However, the Congress of Vienna of 1815 awarded it to Imperial Russia. The town entered a period of decline as the local administrative and religious offices (including the bishopric) were moved to Lublin. In the mid-19th century, the Russian Army turned the town into a strong garrison, which made Russian soldiers a significant part of the population. The period of decline ended in 1866, when the town was connected to a new railroad. In 1875, the Uniate bishopric was liquidated by the Russian authorities and all of the local Uniates were forcibly converted to the Russian Orthodox Church. In the late 19th century, the local administrative offices were restored and in 1912 a local gubernia was created. During the Russian revolution of 1905, a branch of Prosvita, the Ukrainian enlightenment society, was established in the city.

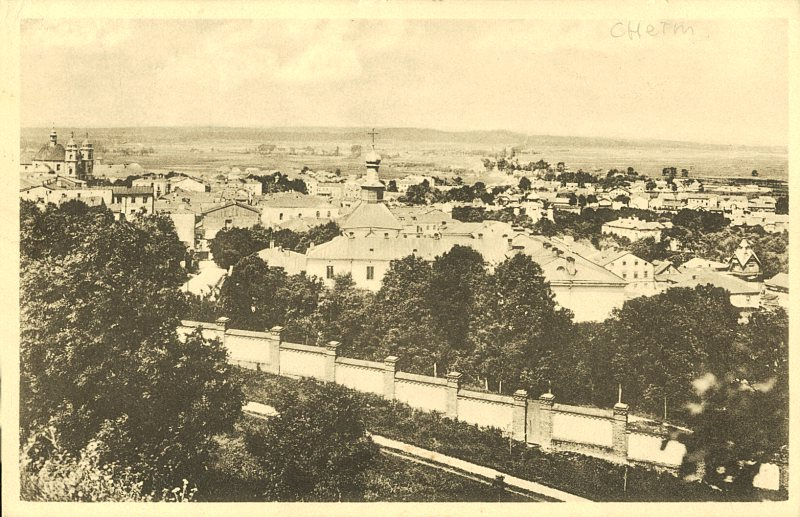
Early 20th-century view of Chełm

During World War I, in 1915 most of the Ukrainian and Russian minority was evacuated to Sloboda Ukraine and Russia. The city fell under Austrian occupation. On 3 May 1918, Chełm was the site of a large Polish manifestation, as over 15,000 Poles gathered to celebrate the Polish 3 May Constitution Day. In September 1918, apostolic visitor Ambrogio Damiano Achille Ratti (future Pope Pius XI) visited the city and was greeted by the local Polish population. On 2 November 1918, local members of the Polish Military Organisation and students of local schools, led by Gustaw Orlicz-Dreszer, disarmed Austrian soldiers and liberated the city from Austrian rule, nine days before Poland officially regained independence. Chełm was one of the first liberated Polish cities of the former Russian Partition of Poland. The Polish 1st Cavalry Regiment was established in Chełm, which soon liberated the nearby towns of Włodawa and Hrubieszów. In the interbellum, Chełm was a county seat, administratively located in the Lublin Voivodeship (1919–1939) of the Second Polish Republic.

=== World War II ===
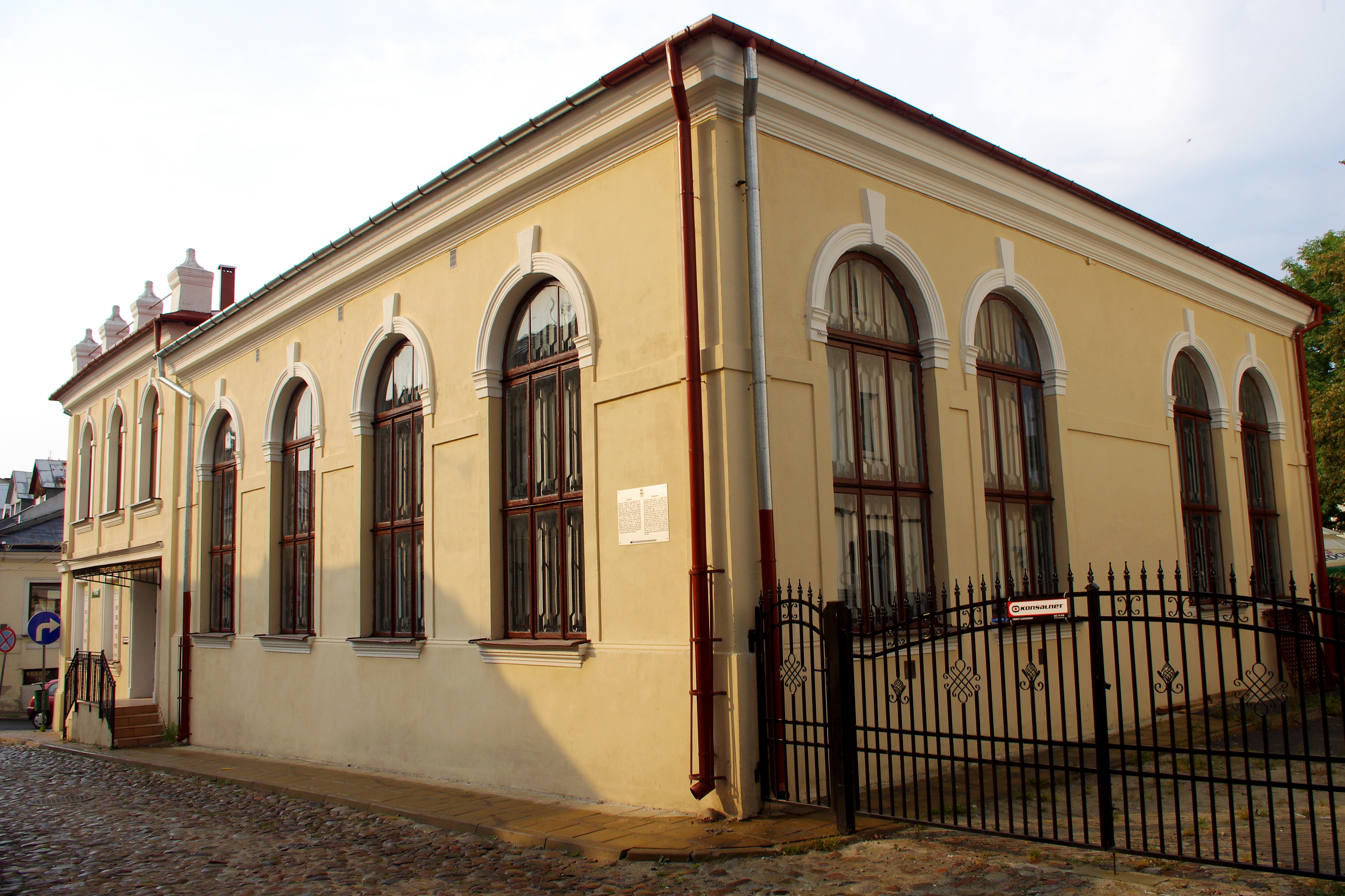
The former building of the "Small Synagogue" in Chełm

During the joint German-Soviet invasion of Poland which started World War II, the invading Soviet Red Army occupied Chełm on 27 September 1939. Two weeks later, the Red Army withdrew in accordance with the German-Soviet Frontier Treaty. As early as 7–9 October 1939 the city was occupied by German forces and renamed Kulm. At the beginning of the war, Chełm's population was around 33,000 of which 15,000 were Jewish. On Friday, 1 December 1939, at 8 o'clock, around 2000 Jewish men were driven at dawn to the market-square ("Okrąglak" or "Rynek") surrounded by the German SS formations and local indigenous officials. They were forced on a death march to Hrubieszów. Hundreds were murdered on the march, others were tortured and beaten. They were marched to the Soviet border where they were forced to cross the river under gunfire. Eventually perhaps 400 of the men survived the Death March and 1600 were slaughtered.

In January 1940, the Germans murdered 440 patients of the local psychiatric hospital, including 17 children, as part of the Aktion T4. In June 1940, during the AB-Aktion, the Germans carried out mass arrests of Poles, who were then imprisoned in Lublin, and then often deported to the Sachsenhausen concentration camp, while some were murdered in the region. The local Polish mayor was murdered in a massacre of over 115 Poles committed by the Gestapo in the nearby Kumowa Valley in 1940. In late 1940, Jews were confined to a small portion of Chełm, living in very overcrowded conditions, up to several dozen a room. Jews were conscripted for forced labor near Chełm and in other locations. The German Reich established 16 forced labor camps in the new Lublin district. Locals from neighboring villages and towns of Chełm also were forced to work in these camps. (also Khelm or Kulm in German), Some of the camps were connected to the main railroad line through a 40 km (25 mi) railroad branch line to the killing camps.

In 1942, during Operation Reinhard, the highly secretive Bełżec, Treblinka, and the Sobibór extermination camps were built near the forced labor camps. Their purpose was to murder all Polish Jews. In May 1942, 1000 elderly Chełm Jews were sent to the Sobibór extermination camp where they were immediately murdered. In August, 3000 to 4000 more were sent, including most of the children in the ghetto. In October, the SS and their Ukrainian auxiliaries rounded up and deported another 2000 to 3000 Jews to Sobibor. In November, the remaining Jews were marched to the railway station. Most were sent to Sobibor. Those in hiding were hunted, and the SS burned several ghetto buildings and killed many people who emerged from hiding. Some Jews remained in the ghetto as laborers, but they too were murdered in January 1943. There were only an estimated 60 Jews from Chełm who survived the Holocaust. Some survivors managed to find shelter in the Chełm Chalk Tunnels. However, as many as 400 others who fled to the east at the beginning of the war returned to Chełm but quickly moved on.

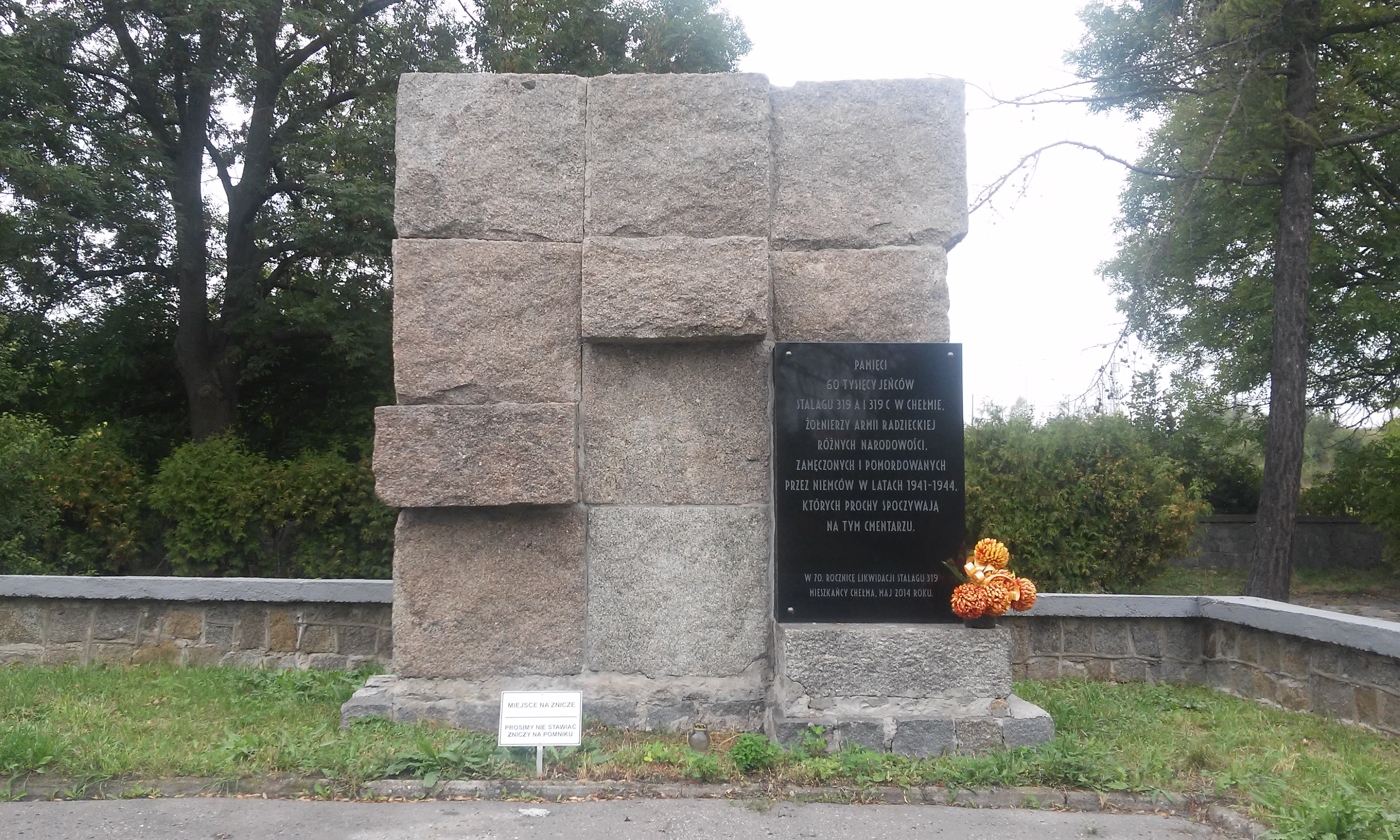
Memorial dedicated to the victims of the Stalag 319 POW camp

Following the 1941 Operation Barbarossa the Germans established the Stalag 319 prisoner-of-war camp in Chełm, in which they imprisoned Soviet, French, British, Italian and other Allied POWs. A total of some 200,000 POWs passed through the camp, and some 90,000 died there. In May 1944, the camp was relocated to Skierniewice. The monument commemorating the victims of Stalag 319 was unveiled in Chełm in May 2009 in the presence of foreign diplomats.

From 1942 through to 1945, Chełm was one of numerous locations of the Volhynian massacres of Poles by death squads of OUN-UPA and groups of Ukrainian nationalists. The city and its environs allegedly witnessed revenge killings as well, between Ukrainians and its Polish self-defence. As noted by historians Grzegorz Motyka and Volodymyr Viatrovych, the subject is highly controversial, because in 1944, Roman Shukhevych, leader of OUN-UPA, issued an order to fabricate proofs of Polish responsibility for war crimes committed there.

=== Chełm in Jewish literature ===
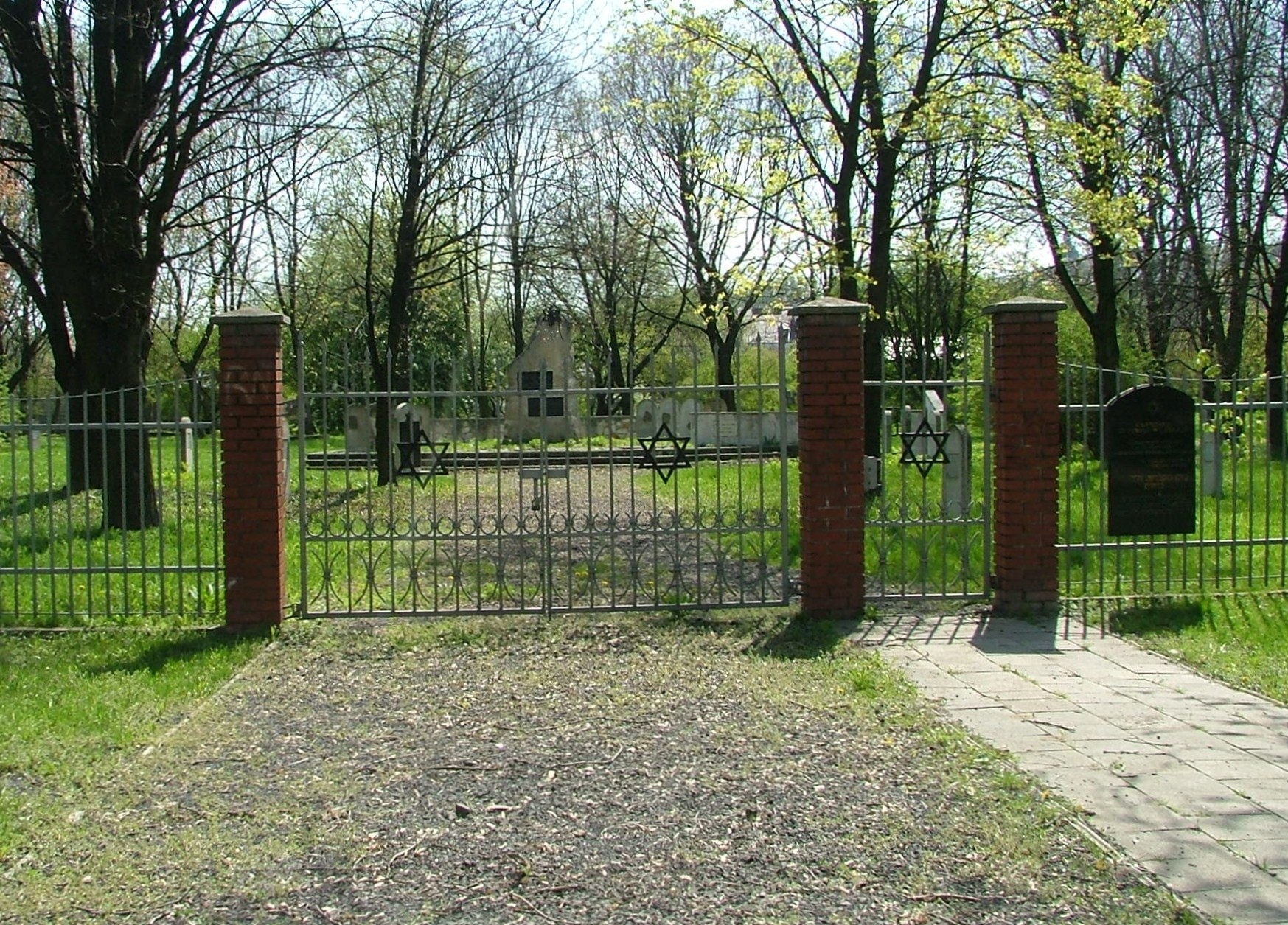
Jewish cemetery in Chełm

By the end of World War II, only a remnant of Chełm's Jewish population of c. 18,000 survived. They managed to emigrate to Israel, the United States, Canada, Latin America, or South Africa. Chełm became well-known as a butt of Jewish humor thanks to Jewish storytellers and writers such as Isaac Bashevis Singer, a Nobel Prize-winning novelist in the Yiddish language, who wrote The Fools of Chelm and Their History (published in English translation in 1973), and the Yiddish poet Ovsey Driz who wrote stories in verse. Notable adaptations of the Chełm Jewish folklore include the comedy Chelmer Khakhomim ("The Wise Men of Chelm") by Aaron Zeitlin, The Heroes of Chelm (1942) by Shlomo Simon, published in English translation as The Wise Men of Helm (Simon, 1945) and More Wise Men of Helm (Simon, 1965), as well as the book Chelmer Khakhomim by Y. Y. Trunk. Allen Mandelbaum's "Chelmaxioms : The Maxims, Axioms, Maxioms of Chelm" (David R. Godine, 1978) treats the wise men of the Jewish Chełm as scholars who are knowledgeable but lacking sense. Some Chełm stories emulate the interpretive process of Midrash and the Talmudic style of argumentation, and continue the dialogue between rabbinic texts and their manifestation in the daily arena. The seemingly tangential questioning that is typical of the Chełm Jewish Council can be interpreted as a comedic hint at the vastness of Talmudic literature. The combination of paralleled argumentation and linguistic commonality allows the Jewish textual tradition, namely Talmudic, to shine through Chełm folklore.

== Demographics ==
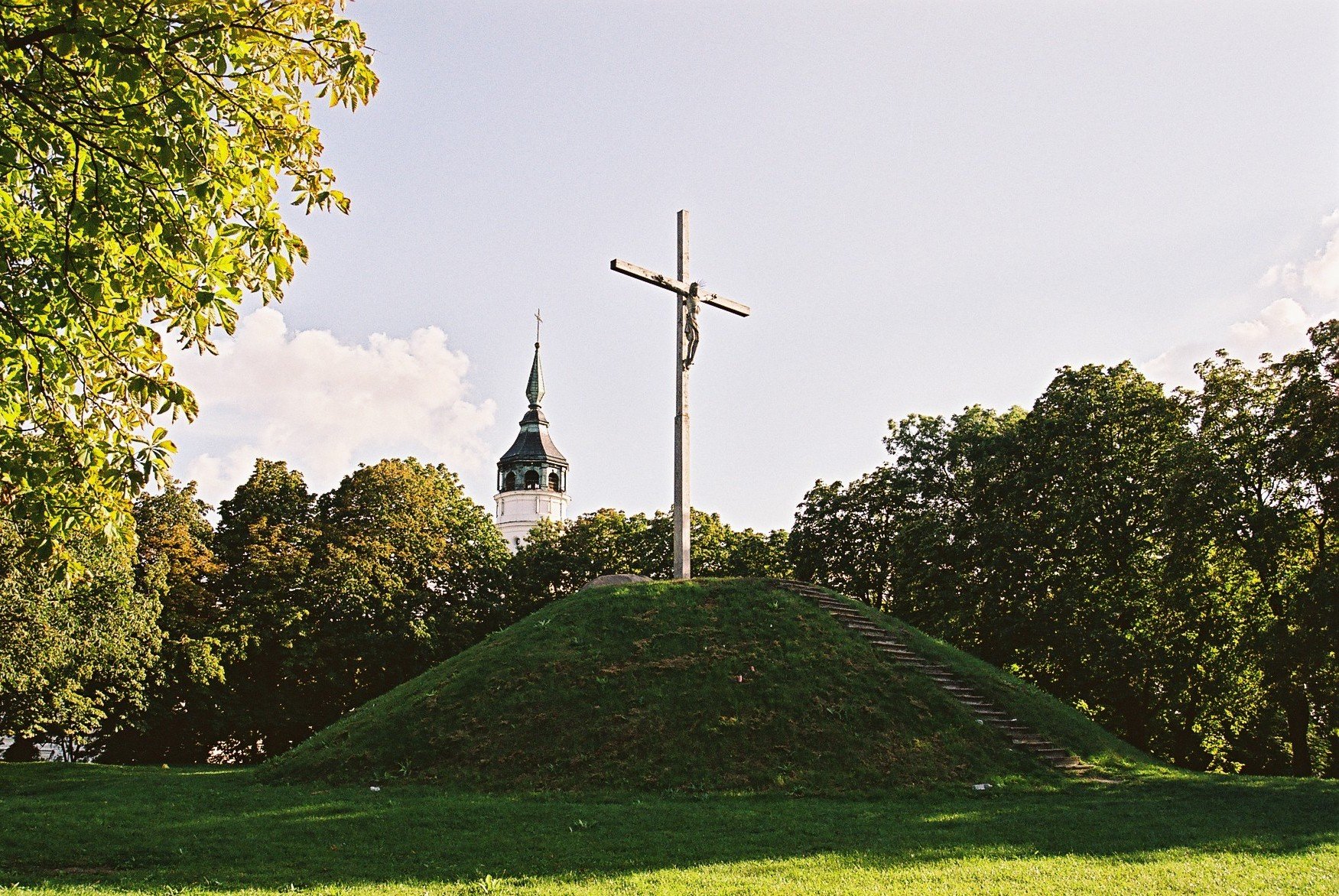
Wysoka Górka, medieval hill fort

After Poland's independence, the Polish census of 1921 found a population of 23,221, 56.2% Polish, 42.1% Jewish, 1.0% Ukrainian (by declared nationality), and 52.0% Jewish, 40.9% Roman Catholic, 5.9% Orthodox, 0.9% Lutheran (by confession).

In September 1939, at the onset of World War II, Jews constituted 60% (18,000) of the city's inhabitants.

=== Number of inhabitants by year ===
Historical population

Year	Pop.	±%
1897	18,452	—
1910	18,036	−2.3%
1921	23,221	+28.7%
1931	29,222	+25.8%
1939	30,900	+5.7%
1950	20,550	−33.5%
1960	31,108	+51.4%

Year	Pop.	±%
1995	69,426	+123.2%
2000	69,012	−0.6%
2005	68,160	−1.2%
2010	66,537	−2.4%
2015	64,270	−3.4%
2020	61,135	−4.9%

== Sights and landmarks ==
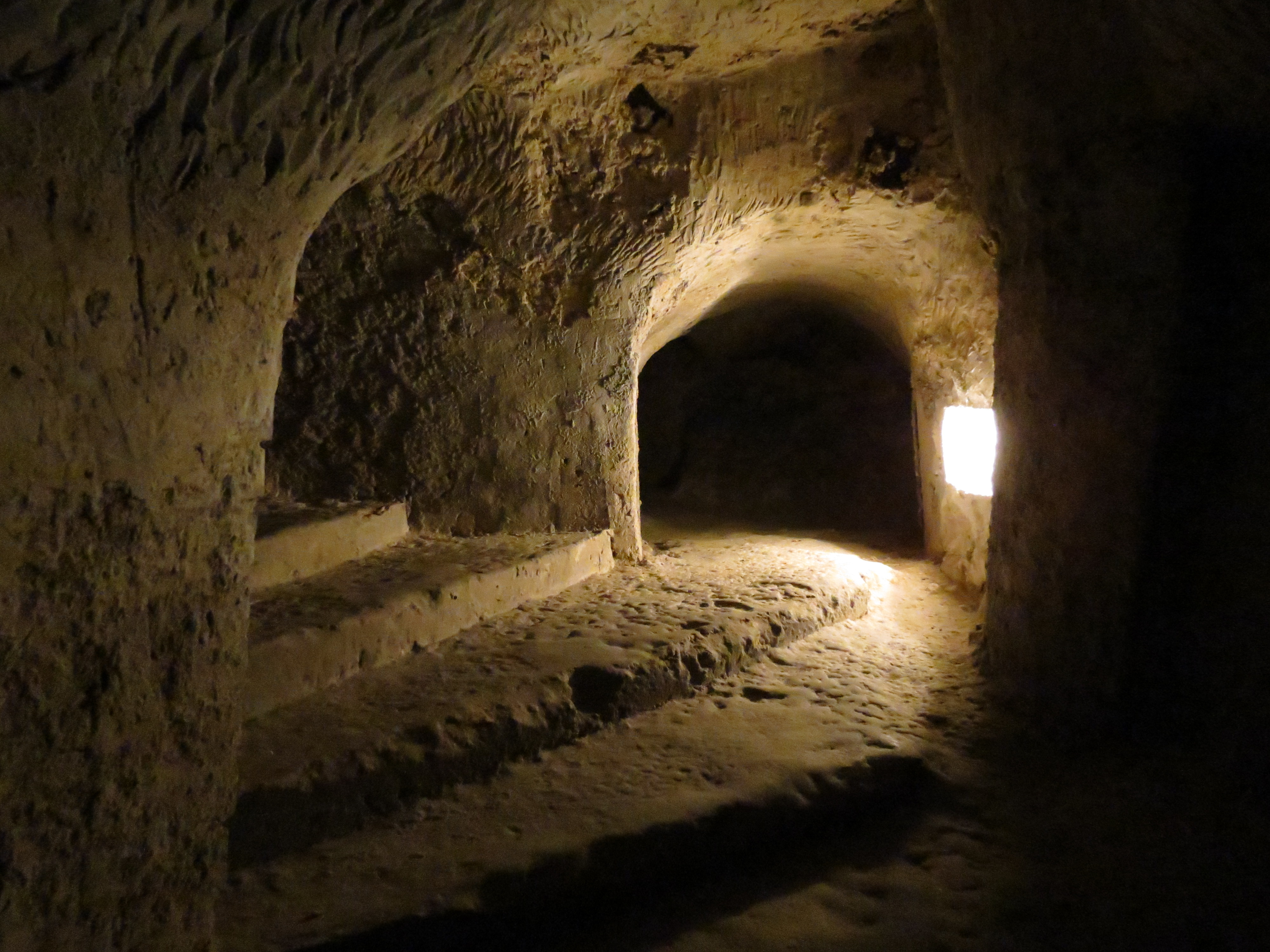
Chełm Chalk Tunnels

The main landmarks and tourist attractions of the city are Góra Chełmska with the Baroque Basilica of the Birth of the Virgin Mary and the Chełm Chalk Tunnels, located underneath the city, a unique structure in Europe and the world. The town's main historic square is the Plac Łuczkowskiego (Łuczkowski Square), which is filled with colourful historic townhouses and contains a preserved old well.

== Sports ==
- Chełmianka Chełm – Polish football club, playing in the III liga
- AZS Chełm – women basketball team, 7th place in Sharp Torell Basket Liga in 2003/2004 season

== Politics ==
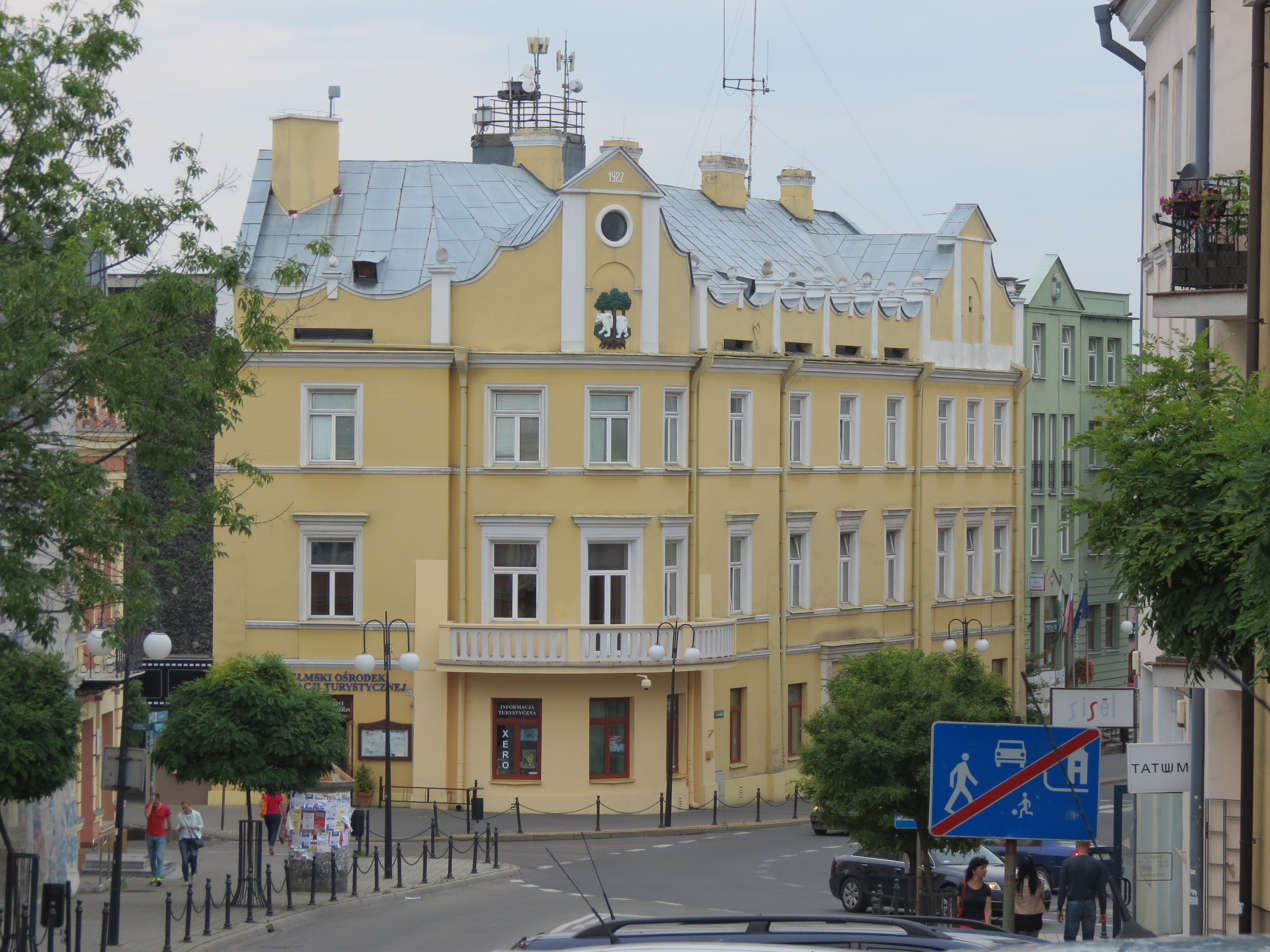
Municipal office, 2014

The most influential Members of Parliament (Sejm) elected from the Biała Podlaska/Chełm/Zamość constituency (2006) included: Badach Tadeusz (SLD-UP), Bratkowski Arkadiusz (PSL), Byra Jan (SLD-UP), Janowski Zbigniew (SLD-UP), Kwiatkowski Marian (Samoobrona), Lewczuk Henryk (LPR), Michalski Jerzy (Samoobrona), Nikolski Lech (SLD-UP), Skomra Szczepan (SLD-UP), Stanibuła Ryszard (PSL), Stefaniuk Franciszek (PSL), Żmijan Stanisław (PO) and Matuszczak Zbigniew (SLD).

=== Symbols ===
The flag of Chełm is a rectangle with 2:3 proportions, divided into two parallel, horizontal stripes of the same width (upper – white, lower – green). On the upper strip, in the center, there is the coat of arms of Chełm.

== Notable people ==
- Elijah Ba'al Shem of Chełm (1550–1583), notable Jewish rabbi
- Solomon ben Moses of Chelm (1715/16–1781), notable rabbinic scholar
- Anna "Ania" Dąbrowska (born 1981), singer and songwriter
- Daniel of Galicia (1201–1264), King of Ruthenia
- Magdalena Gaj (born 1974), state official
- Wiktoria Gajosz (born 2006), athlete
- Ida Haendel (1928–2020), classical violinist
- Mykhailo Hrushevsky (1866–1934), Ukrainian historian and politician
- Edward Ihnatowicz (1926–1988), cybernetic art sculptor
- Renata Reisfeld (born 1930), Israeli chemist
- Rose Schneiderman (1882–1972), feminist and labor leader
- Joseph Serchuk (1919–1993), Sobibor uprising survivor and Jewish partisan
- Józef Szydłowski (1896–1988), aircraft engine designer
- Antin Vasynchuk (1885–1935), politician
- Szmul Zygielbojm (1895–1943), Bund leader
- Icek Ajzen (born 1942), social psychologist

== International relations ==
=== Twin towns – Sister cities ===
Chełm is twinned with:

- Knoxville, Tennessee, United States
- Kovel, Ukraine
- Morlaix, France
- Sindelfingen, Germany
- Utena, Lithuania

== See also ==
- Jewish humor about Chelm: Jewish citizens of Chelm had a reputation for foolishness, often portrayed as lacking in common sense.
- St. John the Evangelist Church, Chełm
