= Antin Vasynchuk =

- Антін Климентійович Васиньчук
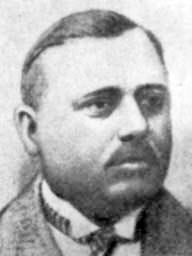
- Born: November 21, 1885. Chełm, Congress Poland, Russian Empire
- Died: May 13, 1935 (aged 49); Chełm, Second Polish Republic
- Occupation: politician
- Political party: Ukrainian Party of Socialist-Federalists
- Parents: Klymenty Vasynchuk (father); Maria Jaman (mother)

Anton Klimentievich Vasinchuk (Polish Antoni Wasyńczuk, Antin Wasyńczuk, Antin Wasylczuk, Ukrainian Антін Климентійович Васиньчук, July 16 / November 21, 1885, Chelm, Kingdom of Poland, Russian Empire - May 13, 1935, Chelm, Republic of Poland) is a Ukrainian public and political figure, the founder of the Rodnaya Khata society and the newspaper Our Life.

In 1918 he became the authorized representative of the Ukrainian People's Republic for repatriation. From 1922 to 1927 he was a deputy of the Sejm of the Second Polish Republic of the 1st convocation, where he headed the Ukrainian parliamentary representation in 1922–1924. He organized the Ukrainian cooperative movement in the Chelm region. He advocated broad autonomy for the Ukrainian population within the Polish state and strove for mutual understanding with the authorities of the interwar Polish Republic. He fought against the spread among Ukrainians living within the contemporary borders of Poland, both communist and extreme nationalist views.

== Biography ==
=== Early years ===
The Ukrainian Greek Catholic family of Vasinchuk came from the village of Ilova in the Chełm Land. In 1810, Nikolai Vasinchuk (1765-1845), Anton's great-great-grandfather, settled in Chelm. Since then, the Vasinchuk family has lived in this city. Anton Vasinchuk was the first-born in the family of philistine farmers Clement (Clemens) and Maria (née Jaman). He had brothers Pavel (1893-1944), Nikolai (born 1897) and sister Maria (1905-1945).

In various materials about Anton and his brother Pavel, their surname is often found in the form "Vasilchuk" (especially in the Cyrillic notation)[4]. As Vasinchuk's biographer Dr. Miroslav Shumylo[pl] points out, in 1917 Anton, Pavel and their cousin Jerzy changed their surname to the above (in the early 1920s Anton had personal documents with the surname "Vasilchuk"). They returned to the original version in 1923, but the Ukrainian press continued to use the form "Vasilchuk".

In most publications dedicated to the personality of Vasinchuk, July 16 is listed as the date of his birth. However, the date of November 21, 1885, is indicated by the data of civil status records stored in Chelm, as well as the entry in the passport of Vasinchuk himself, to which Miroslav Shumilo refers. Anton was baptized in the Orthodox Cathedral in Chelm (in May 1919 transferred by the Polish authorities to the Roman Catholic Church and to this day is the Roman Catholic Basilica of the Nativity of the Blessed Virgin Mary). He spent the first years in a family house located on Pivovarennaya Street.

=== Education ===
In 1894, Anton Vasinchuk entered a one-class school that operated at the Kholmsk Orthodox Theological Seminary. Since 1895, he studied at a theological school, where students were prepared to enter the theological seminary. He studied well, but was not enthusiastic about religious disciplines. Nevertheless, in 1900 Anton entered the Kholmsk Orthodox Theological Seminary. Education at the seminary took place in line with the policy of Russification, students were instilled with anti-Catholic and anti-Polish views. This indoctrination had the opposite effect on Vasinchuk. After the revolutionary events of 1905, he joined an illegal cultural and educational organization - the Chelm "Community" (Ukrainian Gromada). When this became known, Vasinchuk had to leave the seminary. He moved to Simferopol in the Crimea, where he continued his studies at the local seminary. There he received a certificate of maturity.

In 1905, Vasinchuk moved to Kyiv, where he studied at the Faculty of Agronomy of the Kyiv Polytechnic Institute. There he participated in the activities of Ukrainian student societies - independent organizations of the socialist persuasion. At the same time, he established contacts with Poles engaged in similar activities, in particular with the Corporation of Poles - University and Polytechnic Students (Polish Korporacja studentów Polaków Uniwersytetu i Politechniki). In 1909 or 1910, Vasinchuk moved to New Alexandria, where he studied at the Institute of Agriculture and Forestry. He graduated in 1911 and received the title of a scientific agronomist of the 1st category .

There is no exact information about Vasinchuk's further education and his first work experience. Most likely, he studied at a polytechnical institute somewhere in Russia as an assistant, then worked in the Poltava Zemstvo and as a provincial engineer in Grodno. In 1915-1916 he was a student of the economic faculty of the Kyiv Trade Institute. According to some sources, he also studied in Heidelberg, where he met his future wife, Stefania Galińska, a Polish Roman Catholic. They probably married in 1916. On November 11, 1917, their son Clemens was born, and on June 28, 1918, in Nizhyn, their daughter Irena.

== Political activity ==
According to separate sources, at the beginning of 1917, Vasinchuk joined the Russian Imperial Army in order to carry out propaganda activities among soldiers of Ukrainian origin aimed at raising their national self-consciousness. During the February Revolution, he took part in the liquidation of the tsarist administration in Kyiv, leading the insurgent telegraph and telephone operators. Subsequently, he was a member of the executive committee of representatives of workers and soldiers, headed the provincial commission responsible for providing the military district with food, and finally became a member of the city council of Kyiv. However, Miroslav Shumilo failed to confirm these data.

On March 27–28, 1917, Vasinchuk was a delegate at the congress of cooperative unions of the Kyiv province. At the same time, he became a member of the Union of Ukrainian Autonomist-Federalists[uk] (later renamed the Ukrainian Party of Socialist-Federalists). The Union supported the Russian Provisional Government and advocated broad autonomy for Ukrainians within a federal Russia. Most likely, Vasinchuk was also a member of the Ukrainian Central Rada.

=== Plenipotentiary representative of the UNR for repatriation ===
After the October Revolution, the publication of the Third Universal by the Central Rada and the proclamation of the Ukrainian People's Republic on November 20, 1917, Vasinchuk received an offer to join the socialist government of Volodymyr Vynnichenko as vice minister of agriculture or head of a department at the Ministry of the Interior. However, he rejected these proposals due to the radical position of the government, which tried to compete with the Bolsheviks, proposing, among other things, to eliminate private ownership of land. At the same time, after the signing of the Treaty of Brest-Litovsk on February 9, 1918, between the UNR and the Central Powers, according to which the territories of the Kholmshchyna and part of Podlyashya[uk] departed to the Ukrainian People's Republic, Vasinchuk headed a delegation that went to these lands with an inspection. At the end of March 1918 he arrived in Brest.

Most likely in April 1918, Anton Vasinchuk became the authorized representative of the UNR for repatriation[16]. His task was to make possible the return to the aforementioned territories of the Orthodox population, forcibly evacuated in the summer of 1915 along with the retreating Russian army. At that time, Vasinchuk lived in Rivne, and in order to fulfill his duties, he collaborated with representatives of the German Empire, Austria-Hungary, the Polish Regency Council[pl] and the International Committee of the Red Cross. He created an interstate repatriation commission headquartered in Kovel and several smaller commissions in other cities in Volhynia and Polissya. In his work, he did not separate repatriates by nationality, treating both Ukrainians and Poles equally. At that time, Vasinchuk collaborated, among other things, with the national democrat Stanislav Moskalevsky, head of the district department of the Central Civil Committee in Ukraine (Polish: Zarząd Rejonowy Komitetu Centralnego Obywatelskiego na Ukrainie), who was involved in the repatriation of the Poles of the Kingdom of Poland. Vasinchuk advocated Ukrainian-Polish cooperation directed against the Russians.

=== Socio-political activity in the Kholm region ===
At the turn of 1918–1919, Anton Vasinchuk returned with his family to Chelm. There he focused on social activities aimed at Orthodox Ukrainians living in Poland. At the beginning of 1919, the Ukrainian Charity Committee operated in the house of Vasinchuk, which he headed. The organization focused on material assistance and cultural and educational activities among the Ukrainian population of the Kholm region. Soon the committee was reorganized into the charitable society "Rodnaya Khata". Anton Vasinchuk also actively participated in the activities of the Ukrainian Pedagogical Society, founded in February 1919. This organization was headed by his relative Jerzy Vasinchuk, and its goal was the development of Ukrainian school education.

In the autumn of 1919, Vasinchuk published the Memorandum on the Situation of the Ukrainian Population in the Kholm Region (Polish: Memoriał w sprawie sytuacji ukraińskiej ludności na Chełmszczyźnie), in which he clearly advocated the loyalty of Ukrainians to the Polish authorities. In the document, he described the position of Ukrainians on these lands and called for equal rights with other citizens of the Second Rzeczpospolita, noting that they perform all relevant civil duties. In addition, he argued that the Ukrainians, like the Poles, were hostile to the Bolsheviks. The memorandum also put forward a proposal to open Ukrainian folk schools, a private gymnasium in Chelm, to allow the use of the Ukrainian language in courts and authorities, to streamline church issues and to organize a Ukrainian committee in Chelm with an advisory (for the Polish authorities) function. On October 7, 1919, Vasinchuk, at the head of a delegation, submitted a document to the Ministry of the Interior of Poland, and on October 8, to the office of the Chairman of the Council of Ministers. The Polish authorities reacted disapprovingly to the text; the document itself remained without an official response. It also failed to officially register the "Native House", which, however, continued to operate.

In the fall of 1919, Vasinchuk headed the Ukrainian Delegation, an inter-party political council that brought together representatives of all Ukrainian parties operating in those territories that were part of the Second Polish-Lithuanian Commonwealth, which, after the partitions of Poland, were ceded to Russia. In addition, on February 26, 1920, he led a delegation that met with the Lublin governor Stanislav Moskalevsky and put forward proposals similar to those published in the Memorandum on the Situation of the Ukrainian Population in the Kholmshchyna. Although the Polish official promised to study the situation of the Ukrainian population, this visit did not bring any real results. At that time, Vasinchuk had already established contacts with the Polish Socialist Party) and the Lviv Social Democrats. On June 9, 1920, he took part in a conference of Polish and Ukrainian political organizations, held at the initiative of the left and centrist factions of the Polish Sejm. This event was attended by Ukrainians from the Kholmshchyna, Podlasie, western Polissya and Volyn (this delegation was co-chaired by Vasinchuk and Marko Lutskevich[pl]) and representatives of the Polish Socialist Party, the PPP Piast[pl], the PPP Liberation, the PPP Levytsia» and the National Workers' Party. The meeting resulted in a memorandum with a project of national-territorial autonomy of Ukrainians in Poland. The document discussed in detail the issues of administration, school education, language, self-government and religion[30]. The memorandum was supposed to be the subject of discussion in the Seimas of the Commonwealth, but the resignation of the government of Leopold Skulsky prevented this.

In June 1920, Anton Vasinchuk received a concession to publish the newspaper Nasha Zhizn, the first Ukrainian periodical in the former Russian territories as part of the Second Commonwealth. The publishing house was located in Vasinchuk's house, and his brother Pavel was the executive editor. On June 27, with the financial support of the Lviv Ukrainian Social Democratic Party, the first issue of the publication was published. The newspaper raised social, political, cultural and economic issues with an emphasis on the needs and aspirations of Ukrainians. The authors published in Nasha Zhizn declared at the same time loyalty to the Polish state and a desire for equal cooperation with the Poles.

On August 11, 1920, Anton Vasinchuk and his brother were arrested by the police and imprisoned in the Lublin military prison. The Polish authorities recognized them as politically unreliable, as the Red Army was approaching, and an article was published in Our Life criticizing the government's eastern policy and calling for a peace treaty with the Bolsheviks. In August 1920, the Polish authorities closed the newspaper, banned the activities of the Ukrainian Pedagogical Society and the Native House (the latter, however, continued to operate underground). Vasinchuk challenged this decision, using the support (including in the Sejm) of the MP from the Polish Socialist Party Maryan Malinowski[pl]. At the beginning of 1921, the Vasinchuk brothers came out z-under arrest, but remained under police surveillance. On May 4, 1921, Anton Vasinchuk led the presidium of the congress of representatives of the Ukrainian population of the Kholmshchyna and Podlyashye, at which a document was drafted demanding the observance of the constitutional rights of national minorities. In June 1921, Vasinchuk at the head of the delegation conveyed the demand to Maciej Rataj, the Minister of Spiritual Affairs and Public Education. When this failed, Vasinchuk appealed to the parliamentary factions of the Polish People's Party and the Polish Socialist Party. In response to these appeals, the Seimas sent deputies Stanisław Tugutt[uk] and Yevhen Smyarovsky[pl] to Chelm, where they arrived on July 2, 1921, to study the situation of the Ukrainian population of this region.

== Member of the Seim ==
In the spring of 1922, Vasinchuk advocated the participation of Ukrainian politicians operating in Poland in the elections to the Sejm. He did this despite the boycott announced by the Prime Minister of the ZUNR in exile Yevgeny Petrushevich. Vasinchuk motivated his decision by the fact that “it is better to have in the Seimas not only friends, but also your own representatives ... so that the needs of our language, faith and culture are taken into account”. However, he also expressed concerns about the integrity of the elections and was afraid of their falsification. In April, Vasinchuk headed the Ukrainian Electoral Committee of the Kholmshchyna and Podliashye, and also took the post of deputy chairman of the Ukrainian Electoral Committee of the Kholmshchyna, Podlyashye, Volhynia and Polissya[35]. At first, he planned to work closely with the Polish Socialist Party and PPP "Liberation", but eventually became one of the co-founders of the Bloc of National Minorities (BNM); thus, the Ukrainian forces became an equal partner for other parties of national minorities in Poland. Cooperation with Polish parties would not guarantee such a status.

On June 12, 1922, the charitable society "Rodnaya Khata" was registered. Its legality was also confirmed by the Lublin governor. On September 5, the publication of the weekly Nasha Zhizn was resumed. In October 1922, Vasinchuk headed the "Native House" (Marek Shumilo gives the date October 1, and Jerzy Doroshevsky - October 15). In parallel with this, he conducted his election campaign. In the nationwide list, his candidacy was in a fairly high place; in constituency No. 28, covering Janow-Lubelski, Krasnystav and Grubeshov, Vasinchuk was nominated as the first number on the BNM list.

=== Chairman of the Ukrainian parliamentary representation ===
As a result of the elections held on November 5 and 12, 1922, Vasinchuk entered the Seimas on the national list. He also ran in constituency No. 28, but he refused this mandate in favor of Semyon Lyubarsky, who was nominated as the second number in the district list. On November 22, 1922, Vasinchuk was unanimously elected by the Ukrainian deputies as the chairman of the Ukrainian deputy club. He was also elected chairman of the Ukrainian Parliamentary Representation (UPP), which included both deputies of the Seimas and senators of Ukrainian origin. In the faction, he headed the Agrarian and Economic Committee and acted as a referent of the UPP on these issues. In his parliamentary activities, Vasinchuk advocated cooperation with the Polish left-wing forces and with representatives of other national minorities in Poland. As part of the UPP, he was a member of the moderate socialist-federalist faction. In the Polish Sejm, Vasinchuk was a member of the Foreign Affairs Committee and the Agrarian Committee.

Vasinchuk called for Ukrainian deputies to support a vote of confidence in the government of Vladislav Sikorsky [pl], created after the assassination of President Gabriel Narutowicz in December 1922. In exchange for this, the prime minister agreed to certain concessions to the Ukrainians (in particular, regarding the opening of schools and Orthodox churches)[45]. Vasinchuk, as a member of the agrarian committee, was especially interested in the issue of siege on the Eastern Kresy. He considered state support for the Polish settlers and discrimination against Ukrainian peasants in these territories as a serious obstacle to the establishment of mutual understanding between Poles and Ukrainians in the countryside. Vasinchuk was also very active in matters of school education, calling for the introduction of the Ukrainian language as the language of instruction in all schools in the Kholmshchyna, Podlasie and Polissya. Despite this, he was criticized by some Ukrainian leaders who demanded opposition to the Polish state. When the Ukrainian deputies narrowly voted in favor of refusing to participate in the meetings of the Seimas, Vasinchuk, who disagreed with this decision, resigned on May 16, 1923, as chairman of the Ukrainian parliamentary representation.

=== Federalist Autonomist ===
After the resignation of the head of the UPP, Vasinchuk decided to form his own faction within the Ukrainian deputy club, which would be a counterweight to the pro-Soviet revolutionary socialists and right-wing forces associated with the Ukrainian People's Labor Party. Deputy Semyon Lyubarsky and senators Alexander Karpinsky, Demyan Gershtansky and Ivan Pasternak joined his group. The aim of the group was:

... to achieve for the Ukrainian ethnographic territory within the borders of Poland a broad political and national autonomy with its own Seimas, judiciary, administration, school education and the army, considering such autonomy an appropriate transitional form until the idea of a Great Cathedral Ukraine is realized

On May 28, 1923, during a congress of Ukrainians from the Kholmshchyna and Podlasie in Chelm, Vasinchuk presented the program theses of his group. Among other things, he then said:

We demand territorial autonomy for Galicia, Volhynia, Polissya, Kholmshchyna and Podlasie with a separate Sejm in Lviv, Lutsk or Chelm, which would make laws and decisions on school and administrative issues and establish an administrative-territorial division. Moreover, I demand the creation of Ukrainian regiments in the Polish army, as an example I will point out Austria and Switzerland. Ukrainian regiments must serve on Ukrainian lands - for the defense of Poland against enemies, we must receive the rights that are due to us. I demand that Polish money be inscribed in Ukrainian

At that time, in the Sejm, Vasinchuk dealt mainly with agrarian issues (he opposed the policy of the Polish government to settle Kresy with Polish siegemen) and territorial self-government. At the same time, he did not stop his activities as the head of the Native Hata [50].

In the second half of 1923, a conflict arose between the Vasinchuk brothers. Pawel sought a confrontation with the government of Vincent Witos[pl], while Anton advocated a dialogue with the Polish government[51]. At the beginning of 1924, a split occurred in the Ukrainian parliamentary representation. Despite Anton Vasinchuk's attempts to maintain unity among Ukrainian politicians, on February 22, a separate faction of Ukrainian Social Democrats was formed, which was joined by members of the left-wing UPP. Then, in March 1924, Pavel Vasinchuk, together with Andriy Bratun[pl], Maxim Chuchmai[pl] and Stepan Makivka[pl], began the creation of a new group - the Ukrainian Socialist Association Peasants' Union (Sel-Soyuz)[uk][52]. The progressive disintegration of the UPP has led to the fact that the program of autonomist-federalists has become completely unrealistic. However, Anton Vasinchuk remained true to his views, as a result of which he was known among Ukrainian deputies and senators under the nickname "Antonomiya"[53].

During the spring of 1924, Vasinchuk participated in the cooperative movement of Ukrainians in the Kholm region. On April 13, on his initiative, the consumer cooperative "Prosperity" was established in Chelm[54]. Vasinchuk became a member of the Audit Commission of this cooperative. On May 11, he opened a cooperative congress of the Kholmshchyna, Podlasie, Polissya and Volhynia, during which he proposed the formation of the Ukrainian People's Bank. On June 7, he took over as deputy chairman of the board of the Economic Council of Volyn, Kholmshchyna, Podlyashya and Polissya[55].

At the end of July 1924, Vasinchuk filed an application for withdrawal from the Ukrainian parliamentary representation. The leadership of the UPP, through Vasily Dmitriyuk [uk], tried to convince him to return, but to no avail. Finally, on October 23, the UPP Presidium published a statement informing that Vasinchuk was no longer a member of this structure[56]. He found himself in political isolation, which was the result, among other things, of the growing popularity of the Sel-Union and the growing influence of the illegal Communist Party of Western Ukraine (KPZU) on the Ukrainian population. This situation did not improve with the emergence of the Ukrainian National Democratic Association (UNDO) on July 11, 1925, which included part of the autonomist-federalist faction with the UPP[57].

Due to the growing influence of the Sel-Soyuz and KPZU in the Rodnaya Khata, on November 23, 1924, Vasinchuk resigned from the post of chairman of this organization. He was replaced by Ivan Pasternak. On May 17, 1925, Vasinchuk was also expelled from the board of this society[57].

On October 10, as a result of the merger of most of the Volyn-Kholm Sel-Union and the Galician group Narodnaya Volya, the Ukrainian Peasant-Workers' Socialist Association (Sel-Rob) arose in Lviv. This political and public organization was close to the KPZU[58].

=== Struggle to regain political status ===
In November 1925, Vasinchuk began to work on regaining his lost influence and former status. Among other things, he organized the county economic congress in Chełm. He met the May coup with the hope of improving the situation of Ukrainians in Poland; he supported the previous actions of Marshal Jozef Pilsudski. At that time, he was in close contact with pilsudist Tadeusz Gołówko. The new government did not justify his hopes and showed no desire to change the assimilation policy. In the autumn of 1926, at the initiative of Vasinchuk, the Philistine Peasant Club was founded in Chelm. This organization, with which he pinned hopes for the return of his former political status, consisted of Poles and Ukrainians and had the goal of providing the land-poor and landless inhabitants of Chelm with land after the division of one of Chelm's estates. However, she failed to achieve this result.

On January 15, 1927, the peasant-trading cooperative "Ukrainian Economic Association" (Ukrainian Gospodarsk Association (UGO)) was founded in Chelm, and Vasinchuk became chairman of its supervisory board. At first, the organization developed quite briskly, it managed to open several shops and service points.

In the meantime, a conflict was growing inside Sel-Rob, which ended in a split. Pavel Vasinchuk, who expressed anti-Soviet views, was expelled from the party. A similar fate befell the entire Chelm District Committee of Sel-Roba. Pavel restored relations with his brother and on April 17, 1927, he revived the Sel-Union branch in Chelm. The brothers together tried to free the "Native House" from the influence of Sel-Roba and the KPZU.

On May 22, 1927, an “extraordinary national congress of representatives of the Ukrainian population of the Lublin Voivodeship” organized by Anton Vasinchuk and a group of his supporters took place at the Oasis cinema in Chelm. Its goal was to elect a new Ukrainian National Committee of the Kholmshchyna and Podlasie. Celle-Robe called this congress "self-appointed". During the congress, Anton Vasinchuk spoke out for the loyalty of the Polish authorities, the cooperation of the Ukrainian people with Poland, and against the pro-Soviet bias. His views were severely criticized by the deputies Sergei Khrutsky[pl] and Stepan Kupol, who called him a “scammer”, “a provocateur of the Polish authorities” and a “traitor of the Ukrainian deputies”[63]. During the congress, Anton Vasinchuk was elected head of the Ukrainian National Committee of the Kholmshchyna and Podlyashye by an overwhelming majority[63]. The Committee called for the formation of peasant-trading, production, credit and consumer cooperatives, the Ukrainian People's Bank in Chelm, as well as the mobilization of the Ukrainian population before the upcoming elections to local governments[63]. On October 9, 1927, the Ukrainian People's Bank was founded. Anton Vasinchuk became a member of its supervisory board.

== After the Seim ==
Before the elections of 1928[pl], there was a sharp struggle between the Sel-Union and Sel-Rob for the support of the Ukrainian population of the Kholmshchyna and Podlasie. To strengthen its position, Sel-Soyuz began cooperation with UNDO. At the same time, Vasinchuk spoke out against an alliance with Jewish parties and against joining the Bloc of National Minorities (BNM). This position was a consequence of the Paris trial[en] over the murderer of Ataman Simon Petliura, Samuil Schwartzbard[65]. He also negotiated with Polish pro-government parties. In the end, Anton Vasinchuk agreed to join the Bloc of National Minorities, but set a condition: it was he who had to be in first place on the list of candidates for the Senate. He was refused. Despite this, Sel-Soyuz became part of the BNM. In response, Anton Vasinchuk stopped working with his brother Pavlo and started his own election campaign, creating the Ukrainian National Economic List (UNES) (Polish Ukraińska Narodowa Lista Gospodarcza). The list got number 36.

On February 8, 1928, Anton Vasinchuk succeeded in stopping the publication of the newspaper Nasha Zhizn, since Selle-Robe began publishing articles in it attacking Vasinchuk. The editorial office of the publishing house moved to Brest, where it resumed its activities: the newspaper was published with a circulation of about 1,000 copies and was distributed at UNES pre-election events.

In the parliamentary elections, UNES suffered a crushing defeat without receiving a single mandate. In the elections to the Sejm in the 27th district, he received only 389 votes, and in Polissya - 525. In the elections to the Senate, the list received only 343 and 50 votes, respectively.

After this defeat, Anton Vasinchuk retired from political activity, continuing to work in the field of economics and self-government. At first, the Ukrainian Economic Union (UES) headed by him worked quite well, but soon, as a result of the deteriorating economic situation, he was forced to take loans at high interest rates. At the beginning of 1930, it turned out that the UES was not able to return them. In February 1933, the general meeting of the members of the cooperative decided to liquidate it. Vasinchuk, along with six other UES members, was ordered to pay the debt in installments, which had a very bad effect on his financial situation.

== Last Years ==
Towards the end of his life, Anton Vasinchuk tried to participate in public life: in September 1932, he headed an emergency committee convened in Chelm in connection with the revealed violations in the management of the city economy and seeking the resignation of members of the city council. On November 15, 1932, the city council was dissolved[71].

Vasinchuk planned to run in the May 1934 Chelm city council elections as a representative of Ukrainians on the list of the Non-Party Bloc for Cooperation with the Government. However, the leadership of the BBSP did not accept his candidacy. Then he tried to enlist the support of the Club of the Philistine Peasants and the Society of Peasants. When this option turned out to be impossible, Vasinchuk called for a boycott of the elections[71].

In April 1935, Anton Vasinchuk fell ill with furunculosis - due to purulent inflammation of the hair follicles with necrosis and an accidental injury, acute blood poisoning occurred. The patient was operated on in the Chelm hospital, but his condition did not improve. In this regard, he was transferred to a university clinic in Warsaw, where he was treated for a month. During one of the operations, his skin was cleared, but anesthesia and progressive diabetes mellitus weakened the heart of the politician. His relatives, seeing no improvement, decided to move him to his hometown[68]. Anton Vasinchuk died on May 13, 1935, while returning by train from Warsaw to Chelm. The Polish-Ukrainian Bulletin described his funeral as follows:

The solemn burial of the blessed memory of the Ukrainian leader took place on May 14 at the local Orthodox cemetery after a memorial service in the local Orthodox church. A lot of people of all nationalities: Ukrainians, Poles, Jews, saw off to the eternal rest of the blessed memory of A. Vasinchuk. They also took part in the memorial service: the deceased won the sympathy of many of his countrymen. Many wreaths were laid on the fresh grave. The funeral procession was attended by pupils and pupils of the local gymnasium, who also surrounded with zealous care the children of the deceased - their girlfriends and friends.

== Political views ==
Anton Vasinchuk was a supporter of political understanding between Ukrainians and Poles. In his texts and speeches, he mentioned the anti-Bolshevik alliance between Jozef Pilsudski and Symon Petliura, concluded in 1920. Vasinchuk was an opponent of communism and Galician separatism, promoted moderate views and opposed various forms of radicalism, both political and social.

Vasinchuk sought to raise the national consciousness of the Ukrainians in the Kholmshchyna and Podlasie, urging them to develop the economy, culture, education and self-government in cooperation with the Polish authorities, advocated the active involvement of Ukrainians in the cooperative movement. He argued that the best way to achieve the satisfaction of the aspirations of Ukrainians is by participating in the political life of Poland, using his active and passive suffrage. Throughout most of his political activity, Vasinchuk was a federalist autonomist. He wanted, through negotiations with the Polish authorities, to achieve the formation of a national-political autonomy on the territory of residence of Ukrainians with its own Seimas (in Lviv, Chelm or Lutsk), the judiciary, administration, school education and the army. Such an entity, in his opinion, was to become a transitional form on the way to an independent Ukraine (united with Poland in a federation), which would eventually include the lands of the Ukrainian Soviet Socialist Republic. According to Vasinchuk, the anti-Soviet Polish-Ukrainian union was to become a means of achieving this goal. As he himself stated: First, autonomy should be achieved and cooperation between the Ukrainian and Polish peoples should be established, and only then it will be seen whether the Ukrainian people have already matured, whether it is time for them to think about creating an independent Ukraine. But this takes a lot of time.

In 1927, seeing the low popularity of the concept of autonomy both among Ukrainians under the influence of nationalists and communists, and among Polish left-wing organizations, Vasinchuk revised his views, softening the demands to the following: Ukrainization of the Polish Orthodox Church, opening of closed churches by the Polish authorities, education Ukrainian schools in the Kholmshchyna and Podlasie, increasing the activity of Ukrainians in the areas of self-government and cooperation.

== Private Life and Family ==
He was married to Stefania Galinskaya (born 1898 - died 1975). Seven children were born in their marriage:

- Klemens (b. October 11, 1917 - d. 1992) - a graduate of the School of Podkhorunzhy in Zegrze [pl], a participant in the September campaign. He fell into German captivity, then ended up in the American occupation zone, left for the US and settled in California. As a satellite communications specialist, he worked for NASA (among other things, he participated in the construction of the engines of the shuttle Columbia.
- Irena (born June 28, 1918, in Nizhyn) - during the Warsaw Uprising, she worked in a hospital, then ended up in a refugee camp from Warsaw in Pruszkow, later lived in Sulejów and Zywiec.
- Lyudmila Christina (born November 22, 1919, in Chełm - d. 2001) - lived in Warsaw since 1944, then in a camp in Pruszkow, together with her mother was taken to Germany. Found in the American occupation zone. She emigrated to the United States, where she married the Pole Jan Jabłonowski.
- Maria (b. November 9, 1921, in Kholm - d. April 18, 1945) - during the war she was in Chełm. She was killed together with Pavel Vasinchuk in 1945 (according to various sources, the perpetrators of the murder were representatives of the Polish resistance movement, the Polish communist security services or the NKVD).
- Miroslav (born August 10, 1923, in Chelm - d. 1944) - during the Second World War, he was recruited by the Germans to work as a watchman on the railway, shot dead by Polish partisans.
- Evgeny (twin brother of Leon, born March 24, 1925) - during the war he was taken to Germany for forced labor, ended up in the American occupation zone and emigrated to the USA[78].
- Leon (twin brother of Evgeny, born March 24, 1925) - during the war he was taken to Germany for forced labor, ended up in the American occupation zone and emigrated to the United States. Participated in the Korean War as a military engineer.

The children were brought up in an atmosphere of multiculturalism - both Ukrainian and Polish were spoken in the family. Vasinchuk himself sometimes spoke German to the children. The family celebrated both Catholic and Orthodox holidays.

Contemporaries described Anton Vasinchuk as a balanced, obligatory, rational and punctual person. He was not too emotional, but he had energy, ambition, a lively mind and, at the same time, caution and prudence. He was a good speaker and organizer, had leadership traits. In his prudence, he differed from brother Paul, who was prone to harsh reactions. The brothers often clashed over this. Anton Vasinchuk was fond of geography, collected various atlases and professional literature, and was a friend of the famous geographer, Professor Yevgeny Romer. He was fluent in Latin. He was also interested in Italian painting[83].

In 1919, Anton Vasinchuk acquired a land plot in Chelm at 80 Lyubelsky Street, where he built a three-story stone house with funds from parliamentary activities in 1924. He also ran his own trading office, engaged in mediation in the trade in agricultural products.
