= Vingboons =

Vingboons is a Dutch surname. It usually refers to one of the following three sons of David Vinckboons (1576-c.1632), Dutch painter:

- Johannes Vingboons (c.1616-1670), Dutch cartographer and watercolourist
- Justus Vingboons (c.1620-c.1698), Dutch architect
- Philips Vingboons (c.1607-1678), Dutch architect
