= Johannes Vingboons =

Dutch painter

Johannes Vingboons (1616/1617 – Amsterdam, 20 July 1670) was a Dutch cartographer and watercolourist.

== Early life ==
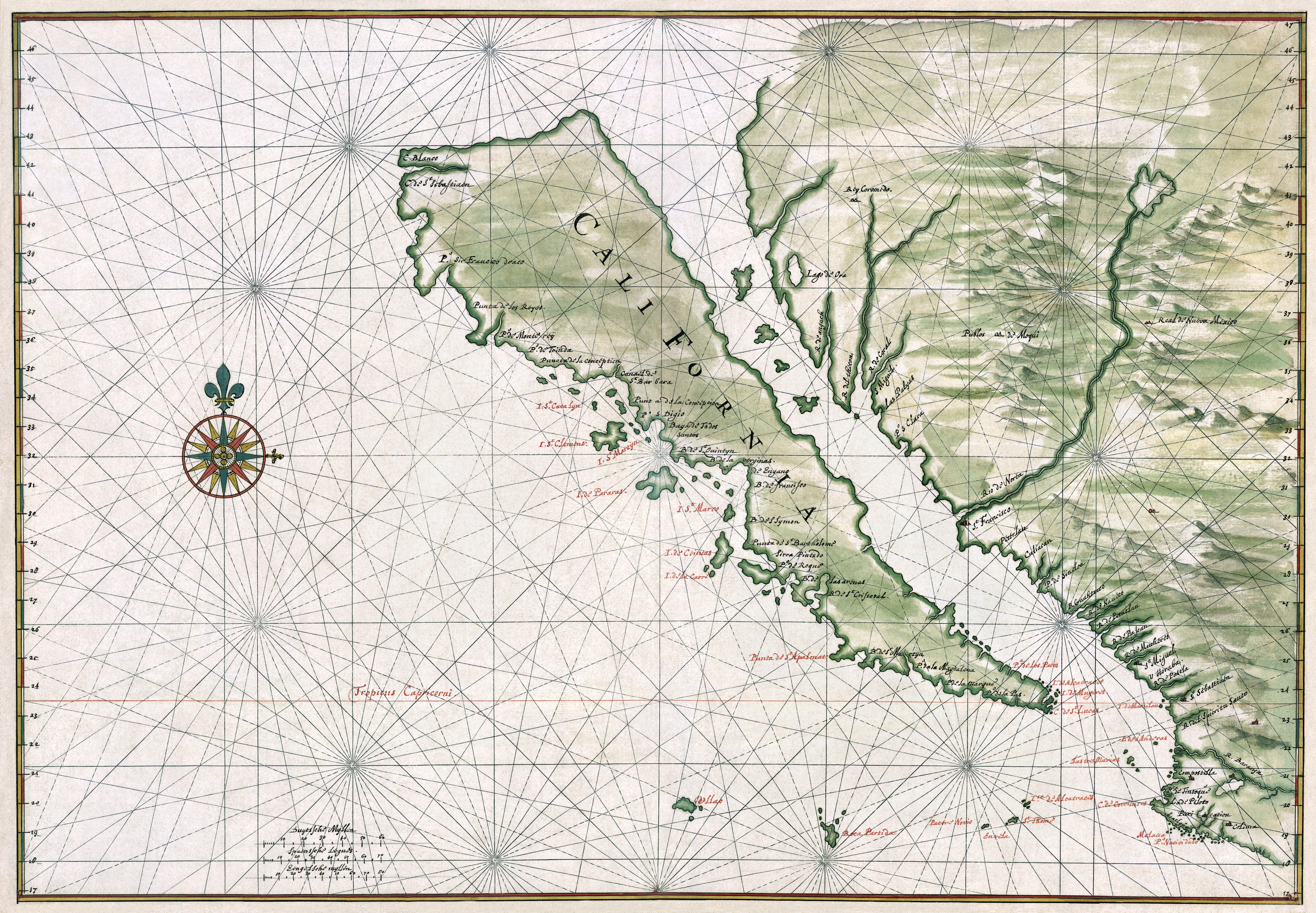
Map of California as an island, c. 1650. Restored version.

Johannes Vingboons was born in 1616 or 1617, probably in Amsterdam, into a large artistic family. His father, the painter David Vinckboons, had moved from the Southern Netherlands to Amsterdam and established a successful workshop there. Several of Johannes's brothers also pursued artistic and architectural careers, including the architects Philip Vingboons and Justus Vingboons.

The family home functioned as both a residence and a working studio. Growing up in this environment, Vingboons learned drawing and painting at an early age and helped prepare designs and illustrations produced in the workshop.

When their father died in 1632, Johannes and his brothers continued working together from the family house on Sint Antoniesbreestraat in Amsterdam. The building was adapted for publishing and map production, and several of the brothers were involved in designing maps, globes, and architectural plans.

== Work ==
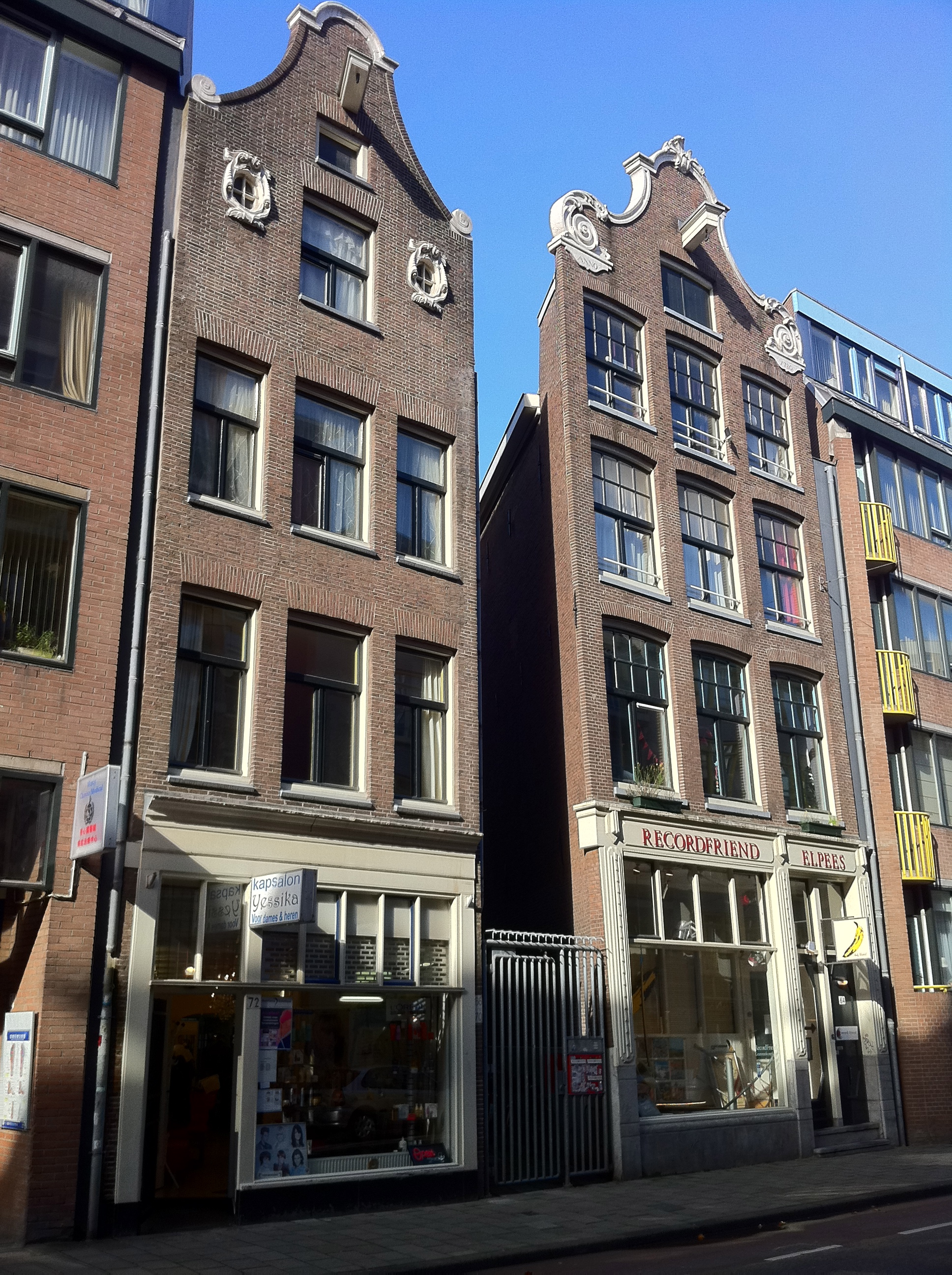
The house on the left was the Vingboons residence and the gap between the two houses is the Salamandersteeg.

By combining his expertise as a cartographer with his skill as a watercolourist, he produced watercolours of coastal cities, ports, and trading regions in Asia, Africa, and the Americas, based on reports and sketches gathered through VOC and GWC networks.

He made city elevations, plans, coastal profiles and sea charts, combining them until he had produced a unique series of images that gave an accurate image of a large part of the world then known to Dutch trade. For many of these areas, his are the earliest images.

Vingboons's work was highly valued in its own time and collected by private individuals. The largest batch, a series of 130 watercolours bound in three atlases, was bought in 1654 by queen Christina of Sweden. After her death these atlases came into the possession of Pope Alexander VIII, and now rest in the library of the Vatican.

The next largest collection, more than a hundred works, is in the possession of the Nationaal Archief in The Hague. A small number of watercolours are in the Medici library in Florence. Four signed parchment world maps form part of the collection of the Nederlands Scheepvaartmuseum in Amsterdam.

A large part of his work were on show from 27 January to 15 April 2007 at the exhibition "Land in zicht! Vingboons tekent de wereld van de 17e eeuw" (Land ho! Vingboons draws the world of the 17th century) in the Kunsthal in Rotterdam, organized in cooperation with the Nationaal Archief. The majority had never been exhibited before and never will be again, because of the images' vulnerability and small size. The three bound atlases left the Vatican papal library for the first time for the exhibition.

== Sources ==
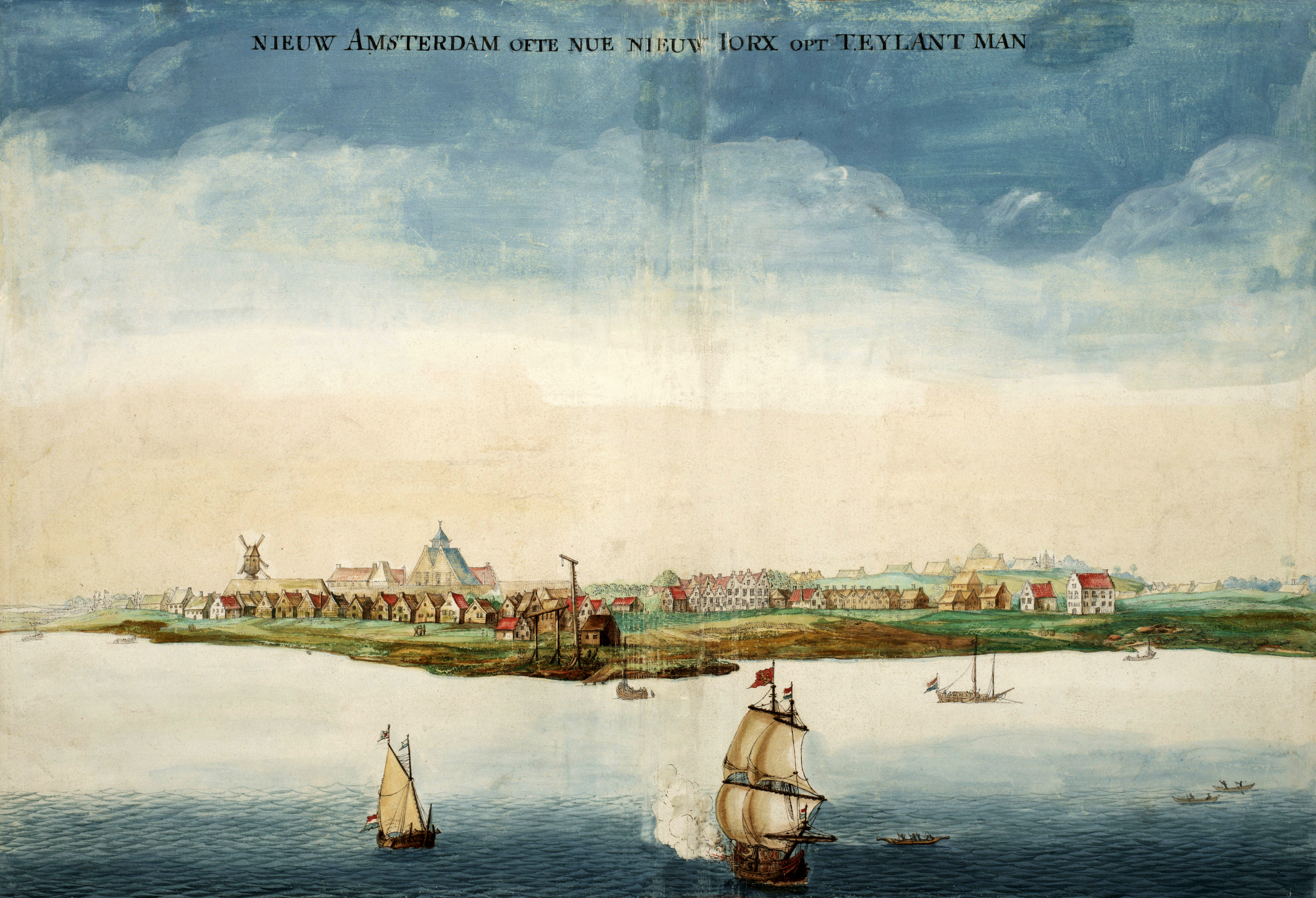
Johannes Vingboons, View of New Amsterdam, 1664

- The works of Johannes Vingboons online in the Atlas of Mutual Heritage
- Johannes Vingboons in the Nationaal Archief
- Johannes Vingboons in the Kunsthal
- Jacobine E. Huisken, Friso Lammertse, Het kunstbedrijf van de familie Vingboons. Schilders, architecten en kaartmakers in de gouden eeuw, Maarssen, 1989, ISBN 90-6179-073-5
- Martine Gosselink, Paul Brood, Land in zicht. De wereld volgens Vingboons, Zwolle, 2007, ISBN 90-400-8292-8 (exhibition catalogue)
