= Nieuwe Toren, Kampen =

Bell tower in Kampen, Netherlands

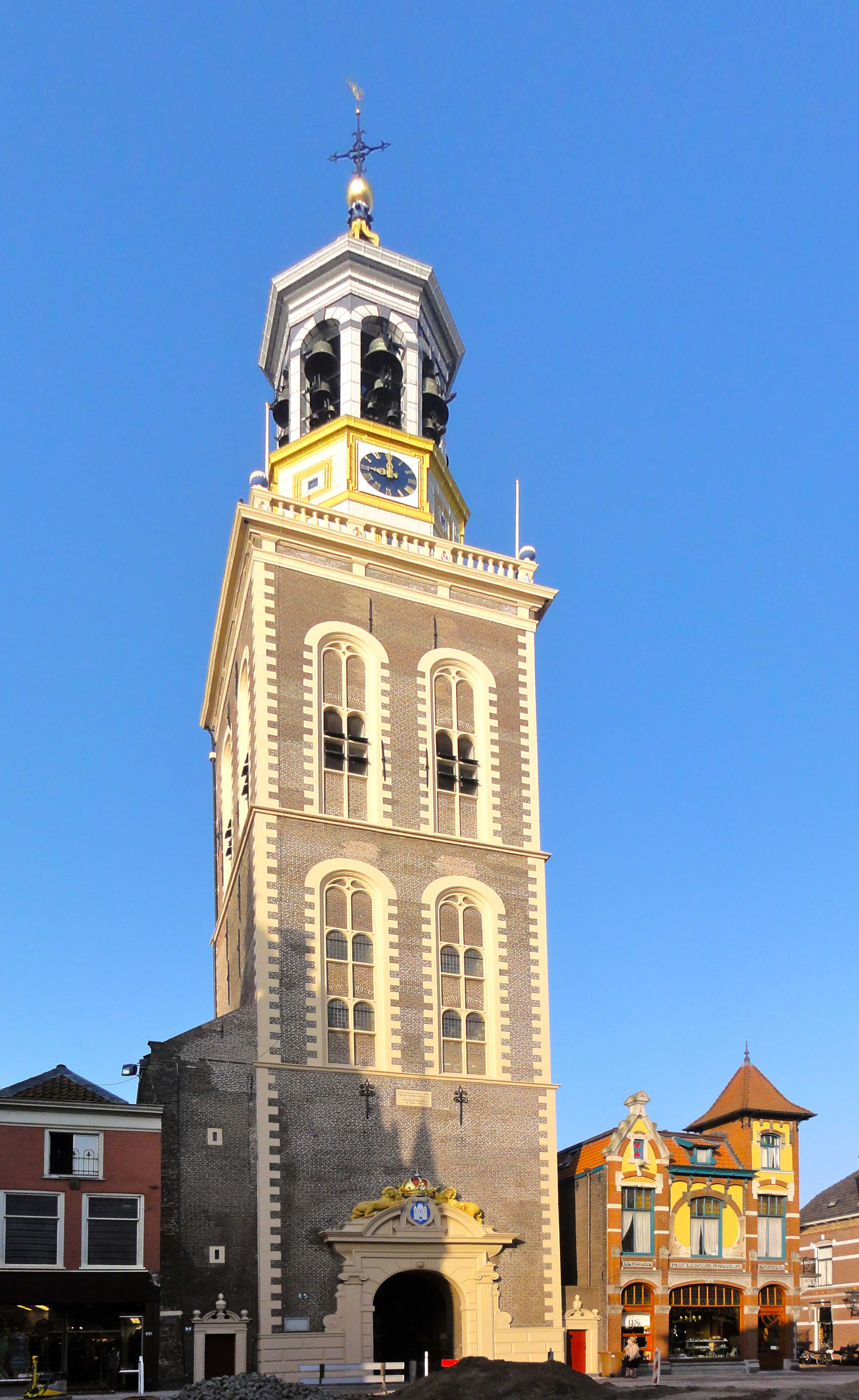
- Nieuwe Toren after renovation in 2012.

General information
- Type: Bell tower
- Architectural style: neo-classical
- Location: Kampen, Overijssel, Oudestraat 146
- Coordinates: 52°33′33″N 4°54′59″E
- Completed: 1664
- Owner: Gemeente Kampen

Design and construction
- Architects: Master Carpenter Dirck Janzn. from Edam and Philips Vingboons

The Nieuwe Toren (New Tower) is located at the Oudestraat in the city of Kampen, in the Netherlands. This Carillon tower was built in the period between 1649-1664 partly according to a design by Philips Vingboons. The lower brick-built part was erected by the Edam mill maker (Master carpenter) Dirck Janzn. The design for the lantern was made by Philips Vingboons, which may have originally been intended for the Town hall now the Royal Palace of Amsterdam. The construction work went through many setbacks, the work even came to a standstill during the period 1655-1660. It was declared a Dutch National Monument (Rijksmonument) in 1972.

== Carillon ==
The Tower houses a carillon which originally was cast and composed by François Hemony. Hemony cast 30 bells in 1659/62, which, with the exception of one little bell that was replaced in 1790 by L Haverkamp, are still present. During the first years, these Hemony bells were located in the Tower of the Kamper Town Hall, as the Nieuwe Toren hadn’t been finished yet. As the town hall tower was unable to provide room for the largest bells, these were only added when the instrument finally was installed in the Nieuwe Toren, in 1663. The added bass bells included three by Hemony, four by Geert van Wou (1481/’83) and one by Kiliaen Wegewaert (1627). This addition of very large bass bells made the instrument an exceptionally heavy and low-sounding carillon.

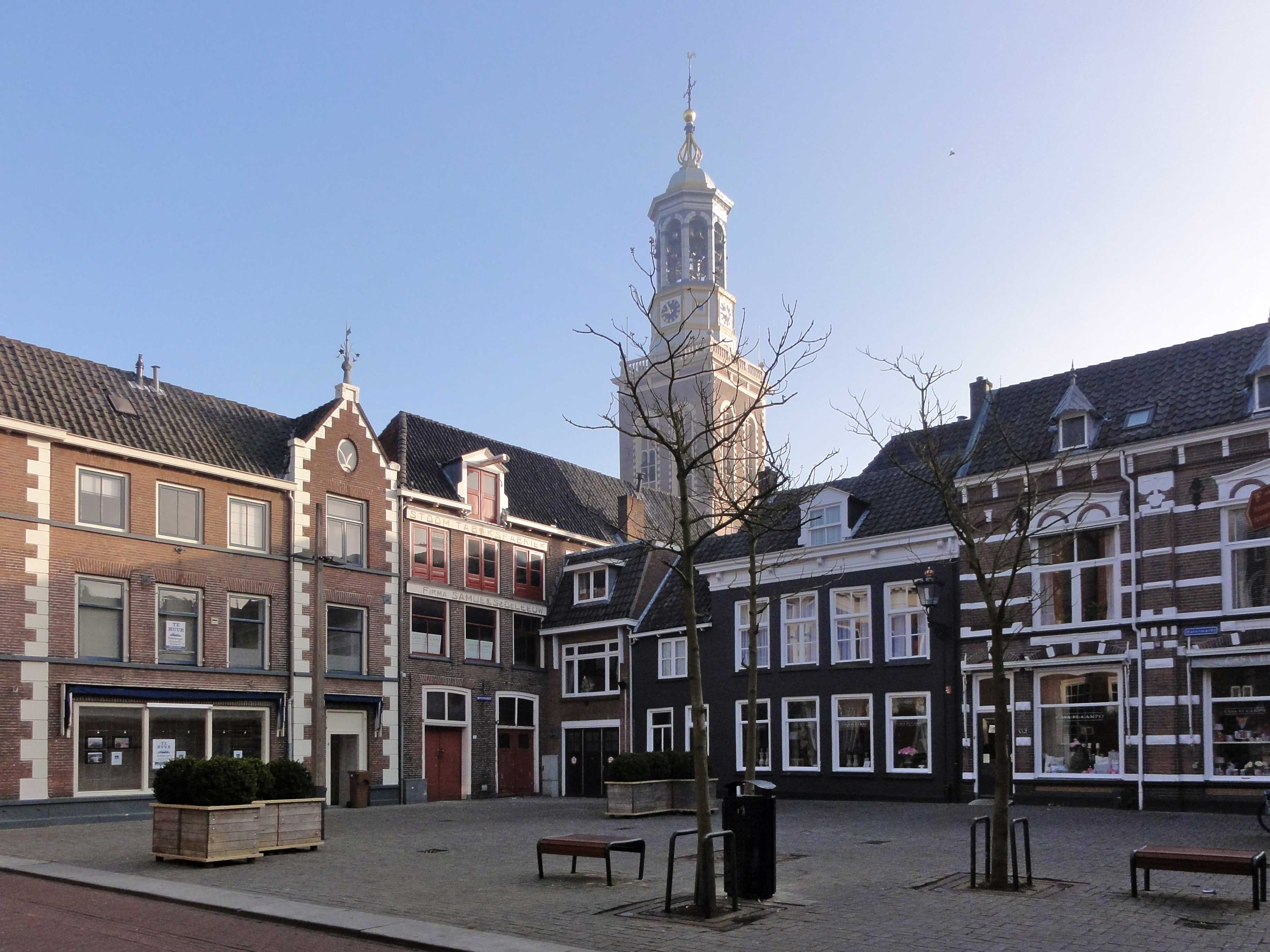
Botermarkt Kampen with the tower in the fog in 2012

The automatic playing mechanism, operated by the mechanical tower clock, plays every 7,5 minutes during daytime. The heart of it forms a large brass drum, cast in 1661 by François Hemony. This mechanism is located in a lower room in the tower. In the 17th century the carillonneur changed the melodies every two months, exception was made in very cold periods in the winter. About this brass drum in particular is known that the carillonneurs in the past have notated many opera melodies with names like Rossini, etc., even in the 19th century.

In 1939 the design of the carillon was changed by the Rotterdam city carillonneur Ferdinand Timmermans. He hung the bells in the octagonal lantern in rows, like in the famous St. Rumbold tower in Mechelen in Belgium. Timmermans was the first Dutch carillon student with Jef Denyn. He enlarged the carillon to 40 bells. The renovation was done by the van Bergen bell foundry with addition of some treble bells by Petit & Fritsen. This situation was not what the Kampen New Tower was intended to be made for. So this was changed in 1978-1980 by Petit & Fritsen from Aarle Rixtel. But still the fis1 and gis1 (d1 and e1) were missing. This time they still did not return to the oldest situation but tried to make an historic restoration. In 1993 the missing basses were added and the missing treble bells from 1940 which were left away in 1980 were added and completed till 47 bells. So at the end there was an almost complete instrument but still not like it was originally before 1939.

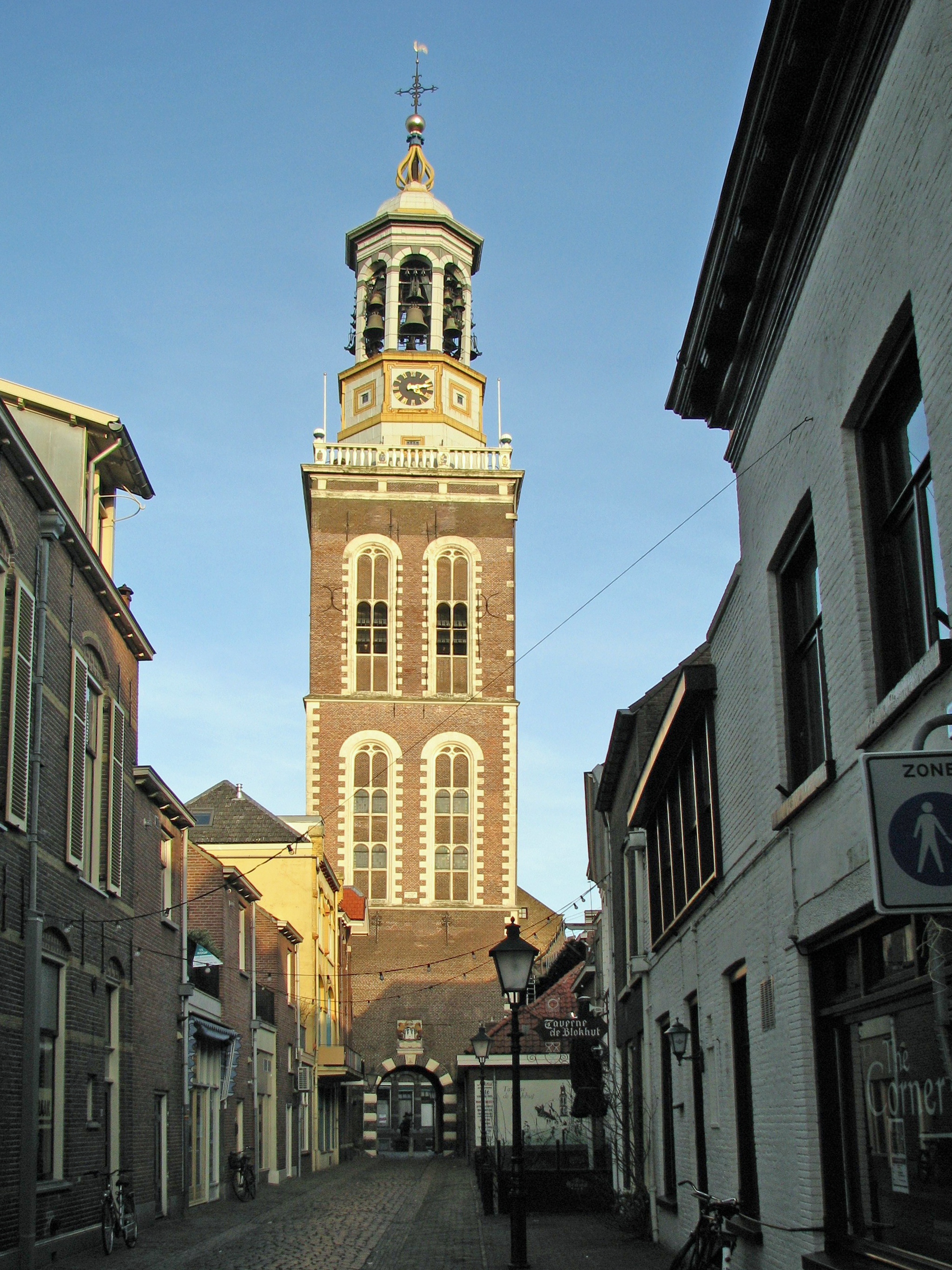
Nieuwe Toren, Kampen before 2008 seen from the west

== 2011 ==
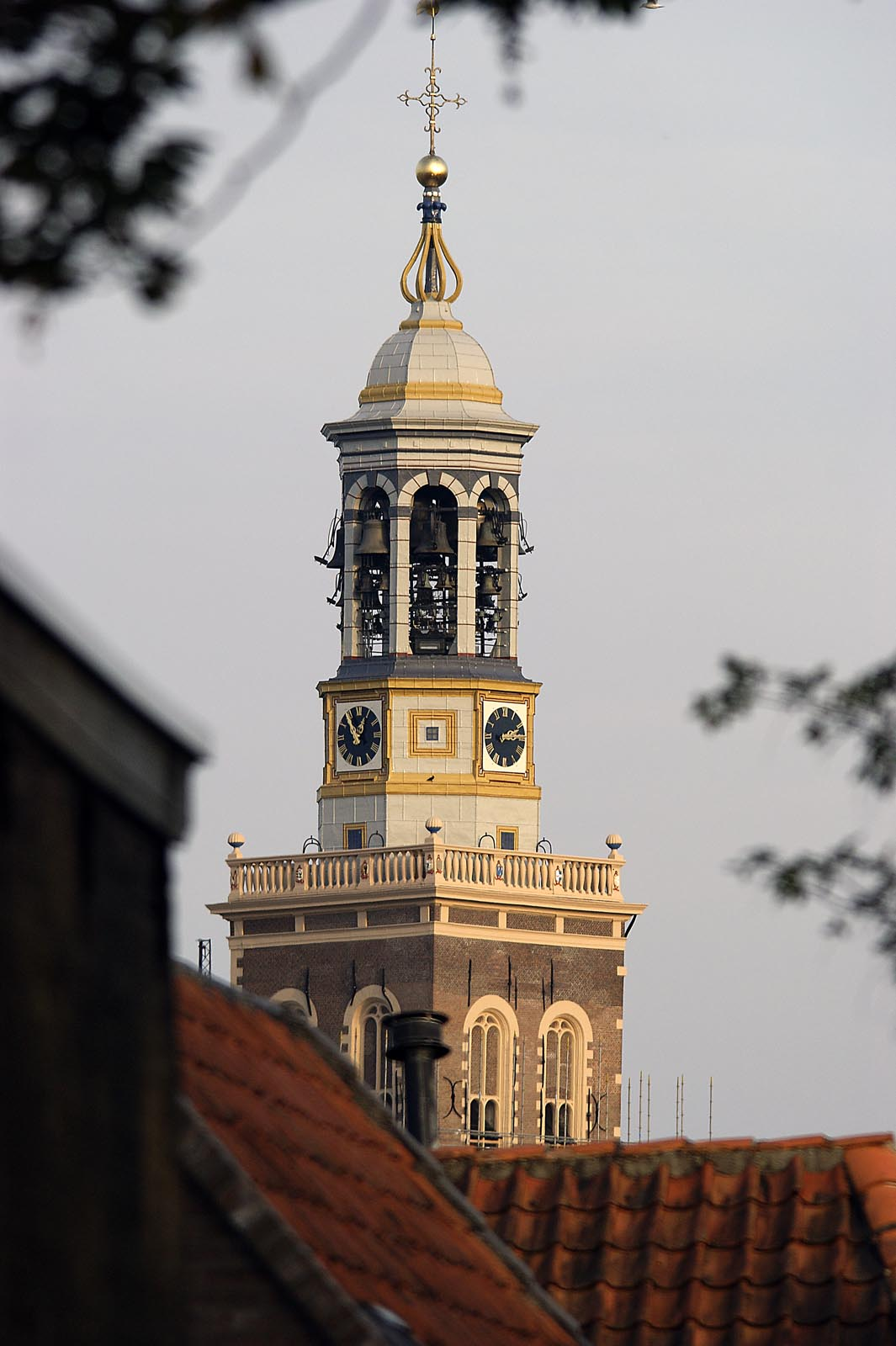
Nieuwe Toren, Kampen just after renovation 2011

The Nieuwe Toren itself was restored in 2011. The carillon had to be removed from the tower in 2008, due to structural problems with the timber upper tower construction. The entire oak structure needed to be replaced as the original beams had been severely damaged by the Death watch beetle. The restoration was completed by the end of 2011. During this tower restoration the carillon was enlarged with an additional bass bell and again hung according to the design from before 1939. The largest bass bells were located at the top of the lantern in that time. The treble bells have been made new in 2011 by the Royal Eijsbouts bell foundry and are a modern interpretation of an old bell shape. The g3 bell by L Haverkamp was already replaced in 1939 by Petit & Fritsen and is still present in the tower. Supervisor/Tutor and Advisor/consultant of this restoration was Arie Abbenes the former carillonneur of Utrecht. Today the carillon of the Nieuwe Toren consists of 48 bells, on which music is performed twice a week by the current City Carillonneur Frans Haagen. He performs at the weekly market on Monday morning at 11 am. and Saturday at 4 pm. In July till half August there are concerts every Friday evening by gast performers at 7.30 pm. Twice a year the melodies on the 'speeltrommel' (the drum) are changed by the city carillonneur.

== Trivia ==
Every summer, during the Kamper ui(t)-days, hangs in the New Tower. a ' Kamper cow ', this to the legend of one of the Kamper uien. (jokes about inhabitants of Kampen)

== See also ==
- List of carillons
