= David Vinckboons =

Dutch painter

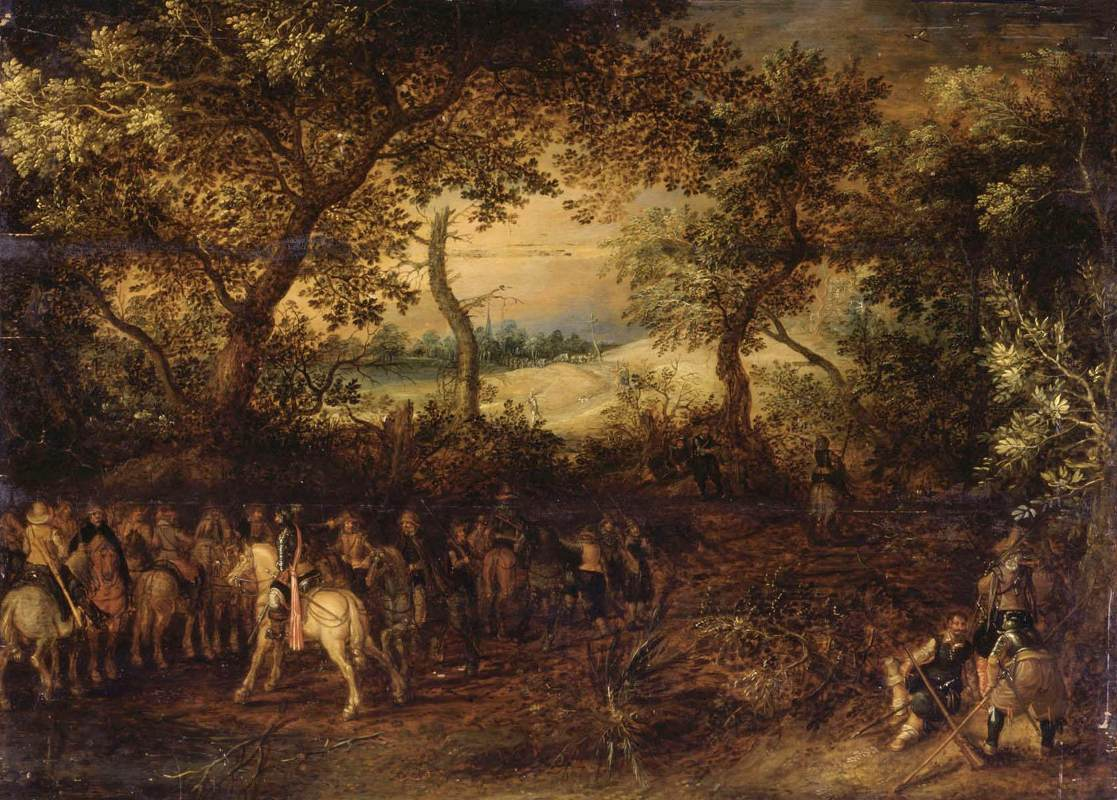
- An Officer Preparing His Troops for an Ambush
- Born: 1576; Mechelen; Duchy of Brabant; Habsburg Netherlands
- Died: 1632; Amsterdam
- Known for: Painting

David Vinckboons (baptized 13 August 1576 – c. 1632) was a Dutch Golden Age painter born in Mechelen, Southern Netherlands. Vinckboons, whose name is often spelled as Vingboons, Vinghboons, Vinckebonis or Vinckboom, had at least ten children. His sons were the cartographer and watercolourist Johannes and the architects Justus and Philip. Vinckboons himself died in Amsterdam.

== Biography ==
Vinckboons was one of the most prolific and popular painters and print designers in the Netherlands. Himself influenced by Pieter Bruegel the Elder, he was instrumental – together with Hans Bol and Roelant Savery – in the development of genre painting in the northern Netherlands.

Vinckboons was born in Mechelen. The family moved to Antwerp around 1580, and then to Middelburg after the Spanish occupation of Antwerp in 1585. It is not likely they moved for religious reasons to Amsterdam. His father became a citizen in 1591, but none of his grandchildren were baptized in a Calvinist church. In 1602 David married in Leeuwarden to Agneta van Loon, the daughter of a notary. Then he lived in Sint Antoniesbreestraat like many other artists and painters. According to Karel van Mander he did not have any teacher other than his father Phillipe, a painter on canvas with watercolors, an art form practised mainly in his birthplace of Mechelen.

David specialized in elegant figures in park-like landscapes (Outdoor Merry Company, 1610; Vienna, Akademie der Bildenden Künste) as well as Kermis and other village festivals. He also produced Biblical scenes such as Tobias and the Angel (1619, Olana State Historic Site). His landscapes reflect his contact with Gillis van Coninxloo. Vinckboons attracted a number of students; among them were Gillis d'Hondecoeter, Claes Janszoon Visscher and probably Esaias van de Velde.

Vingboons, as his name is often spelled, and many other varieties are to be found, had at least ten children. His sons were the cartographer and watercolourist Johannes and the architects Justus and Philip. Pieter, an engineer and soldier, died on Ceylon.

== Work ==
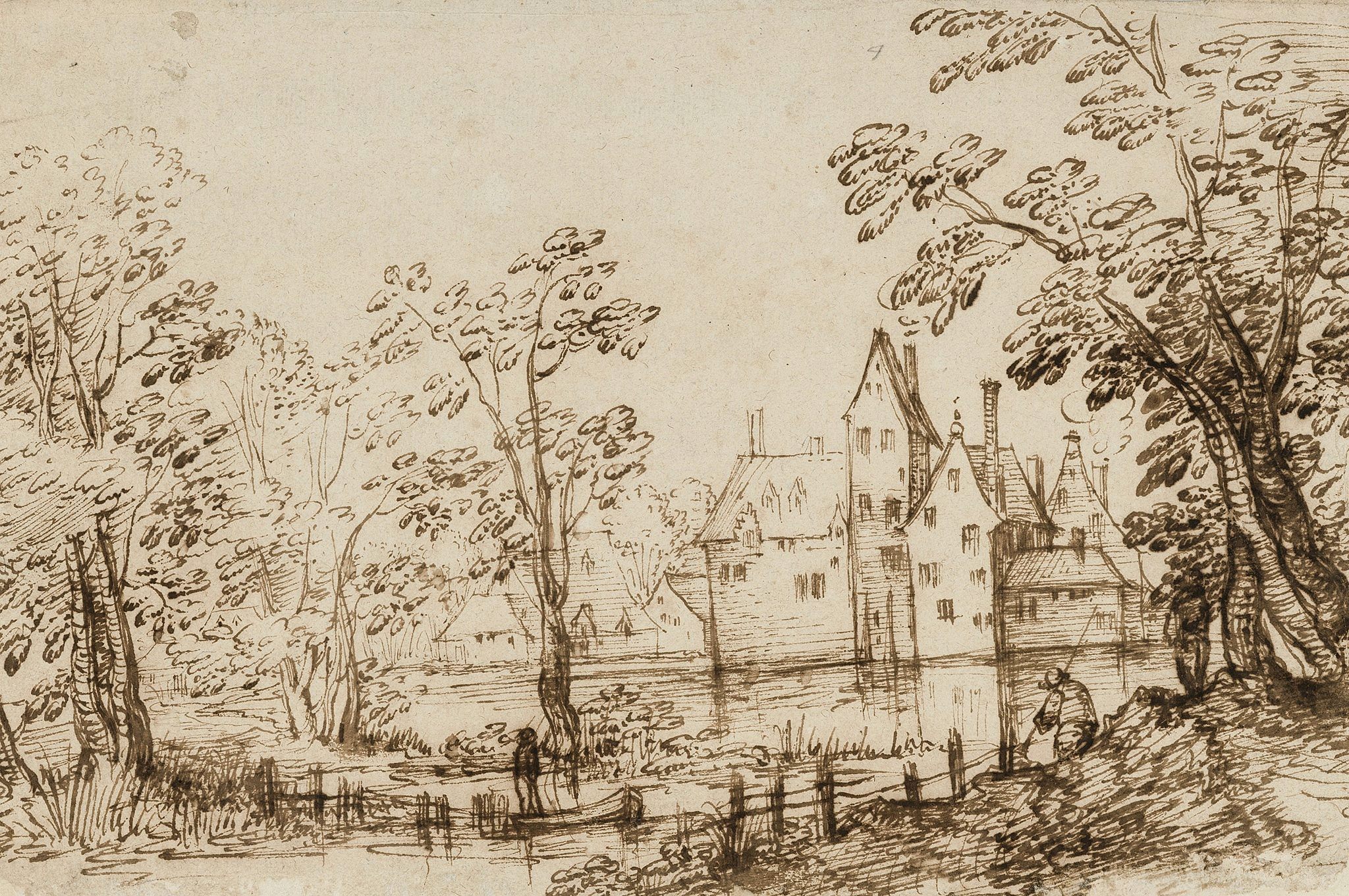

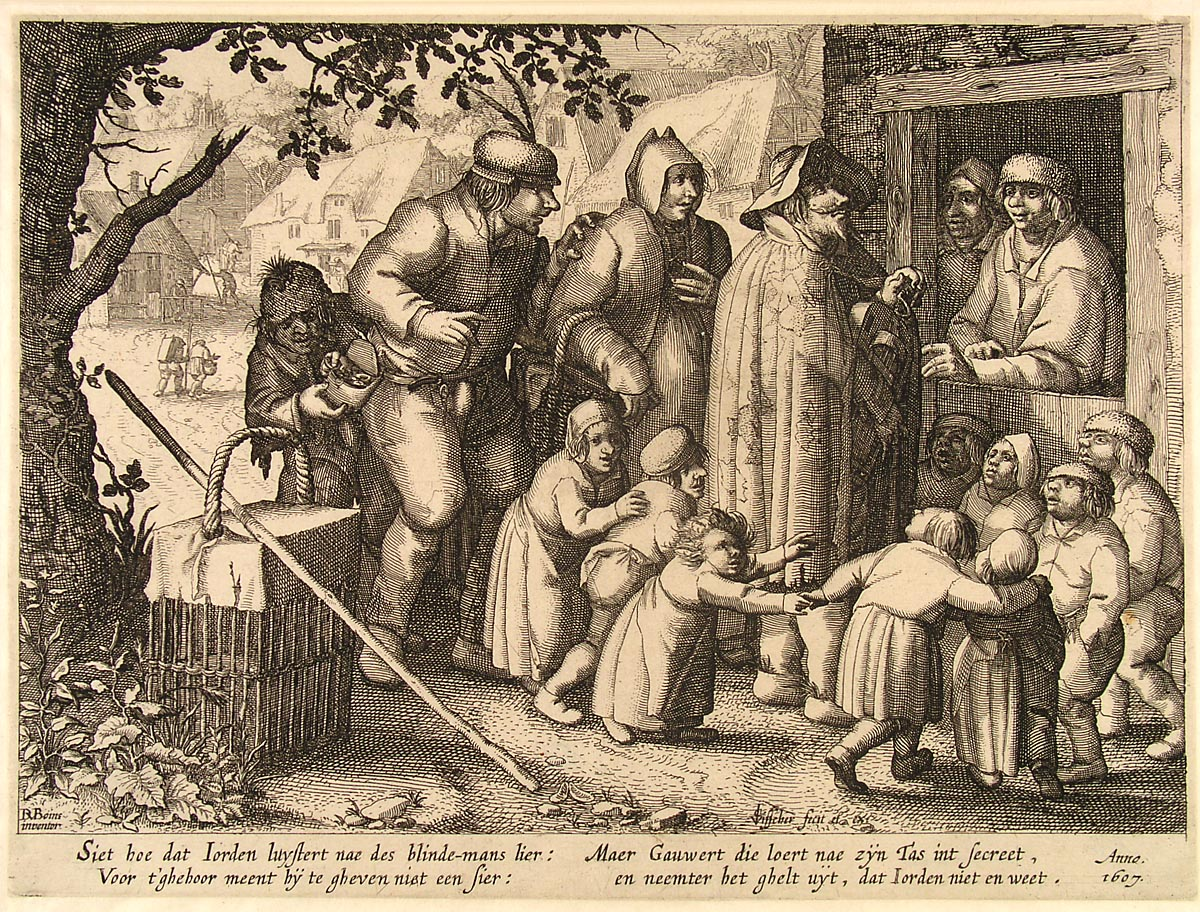

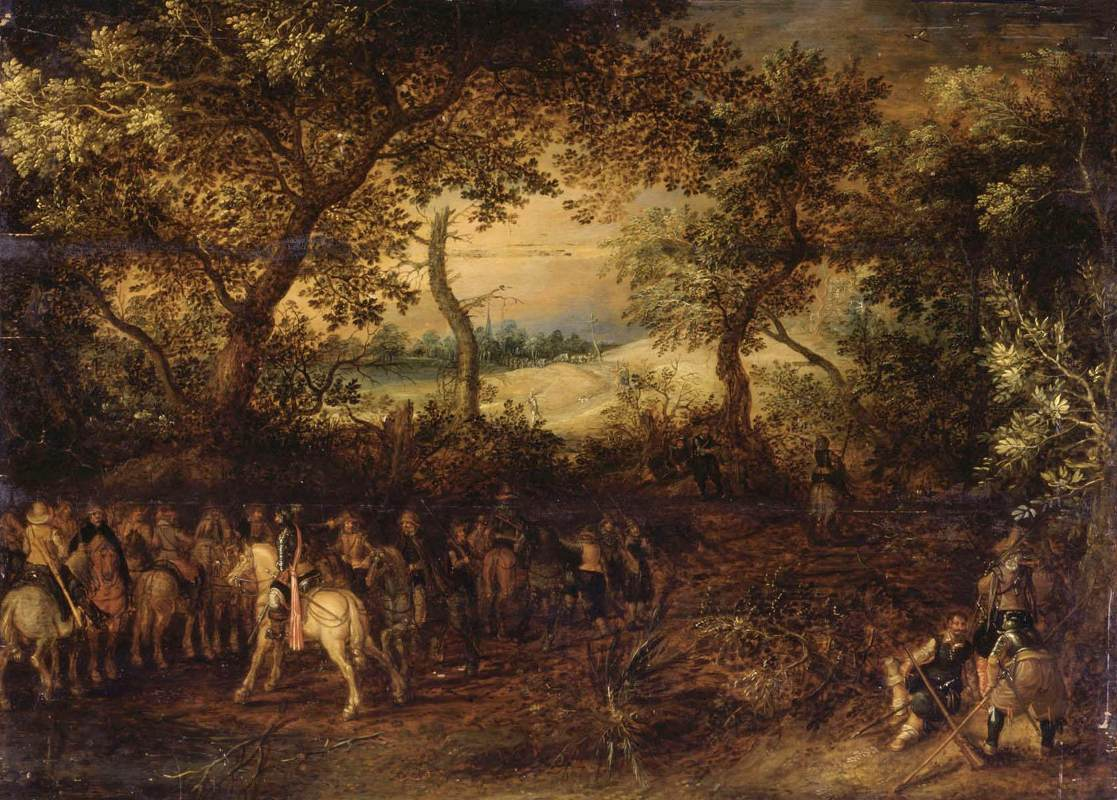

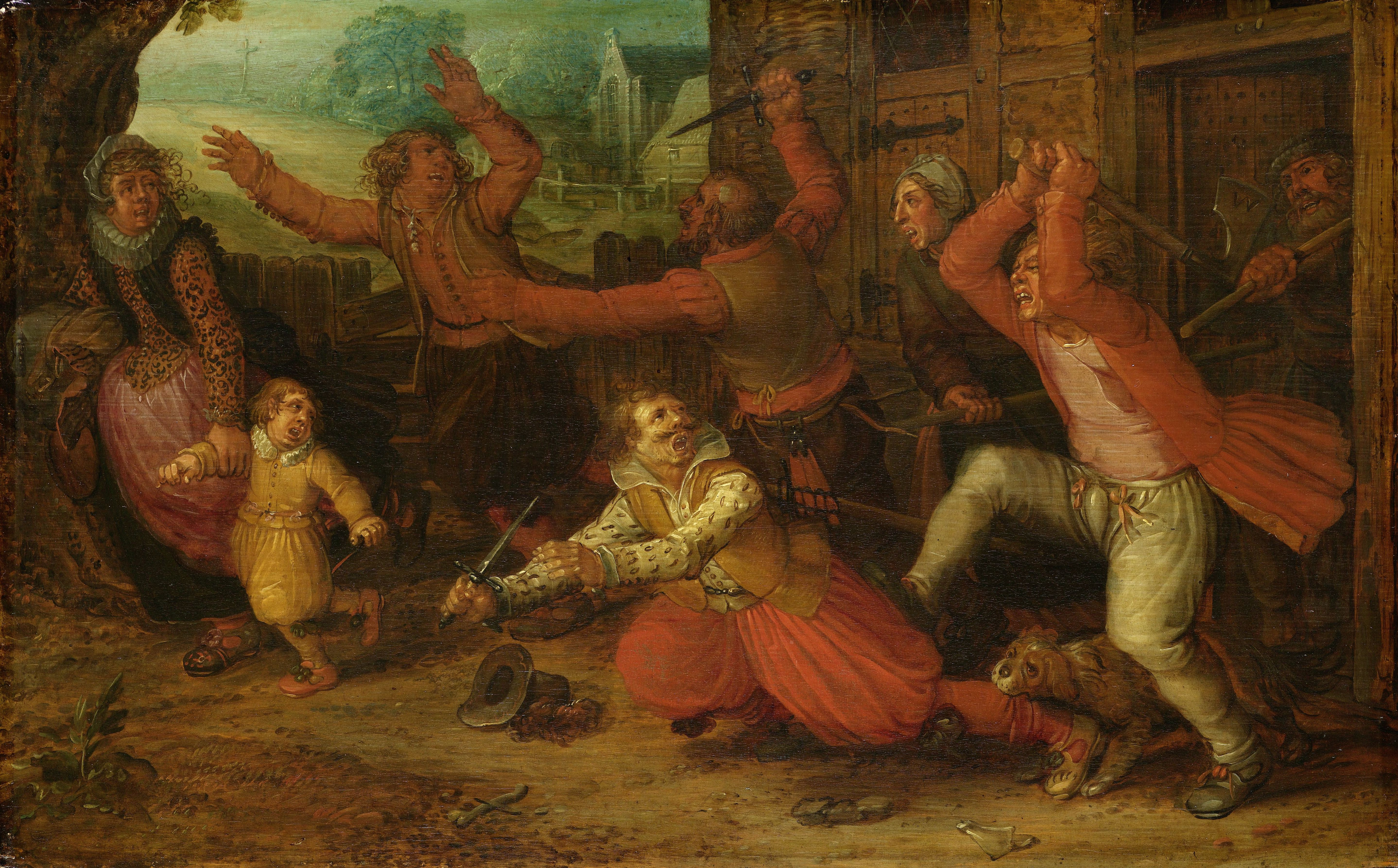

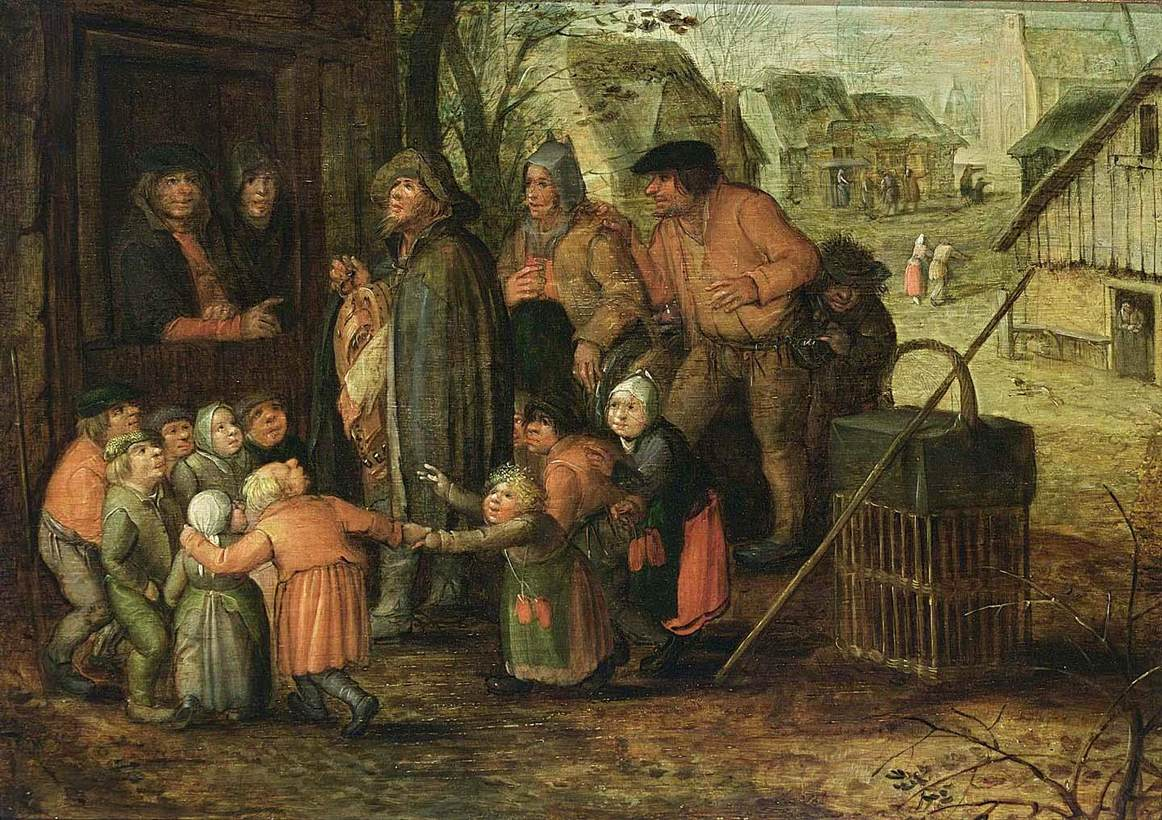

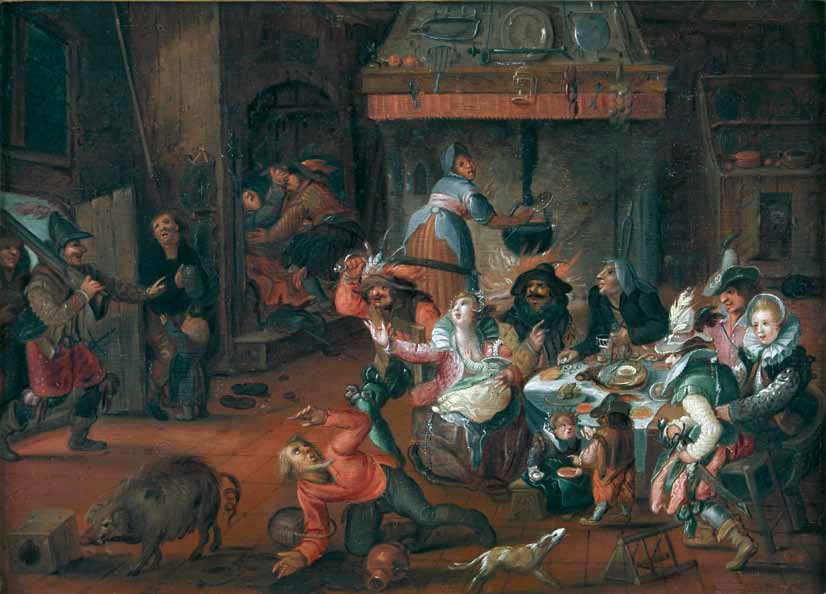

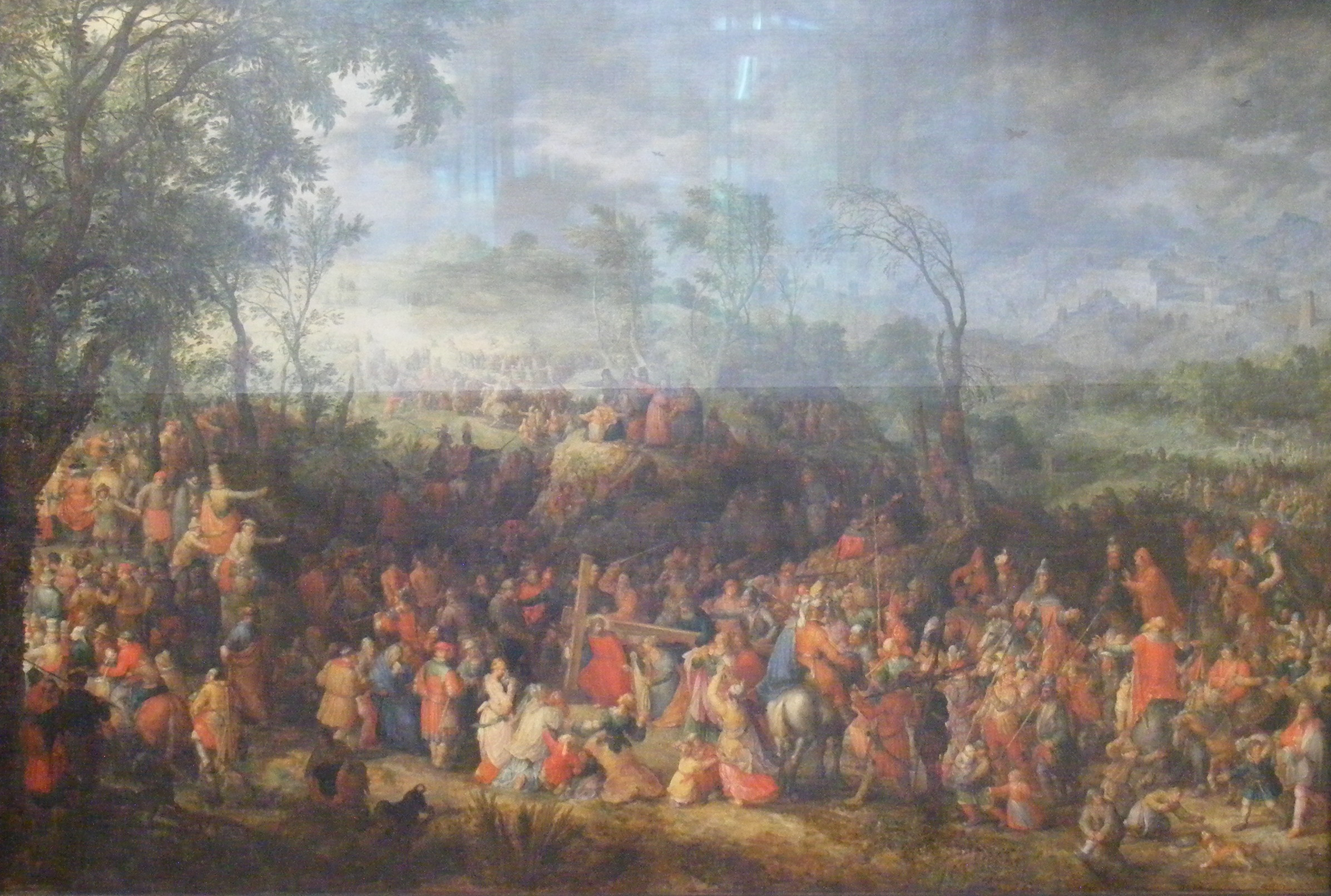

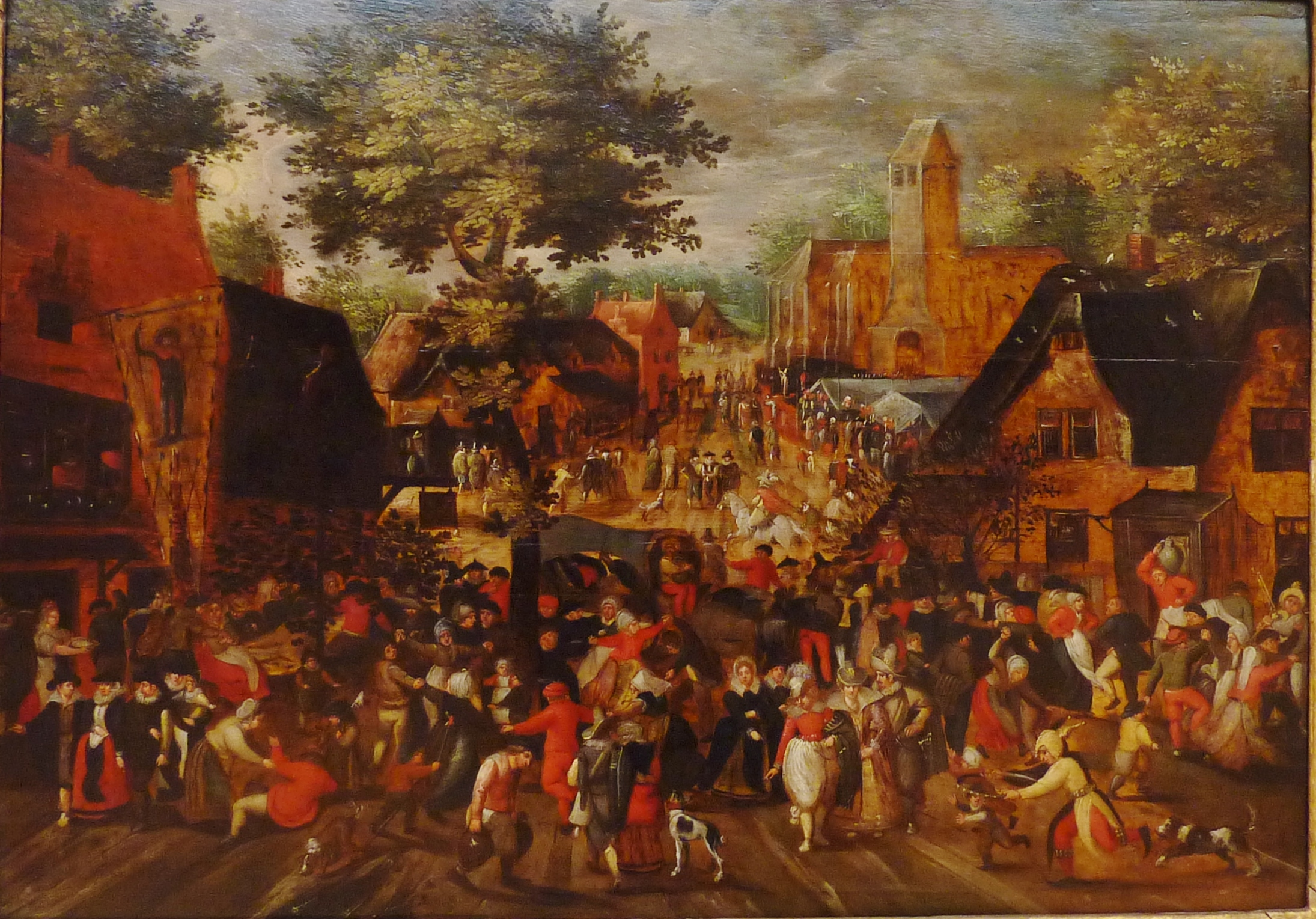

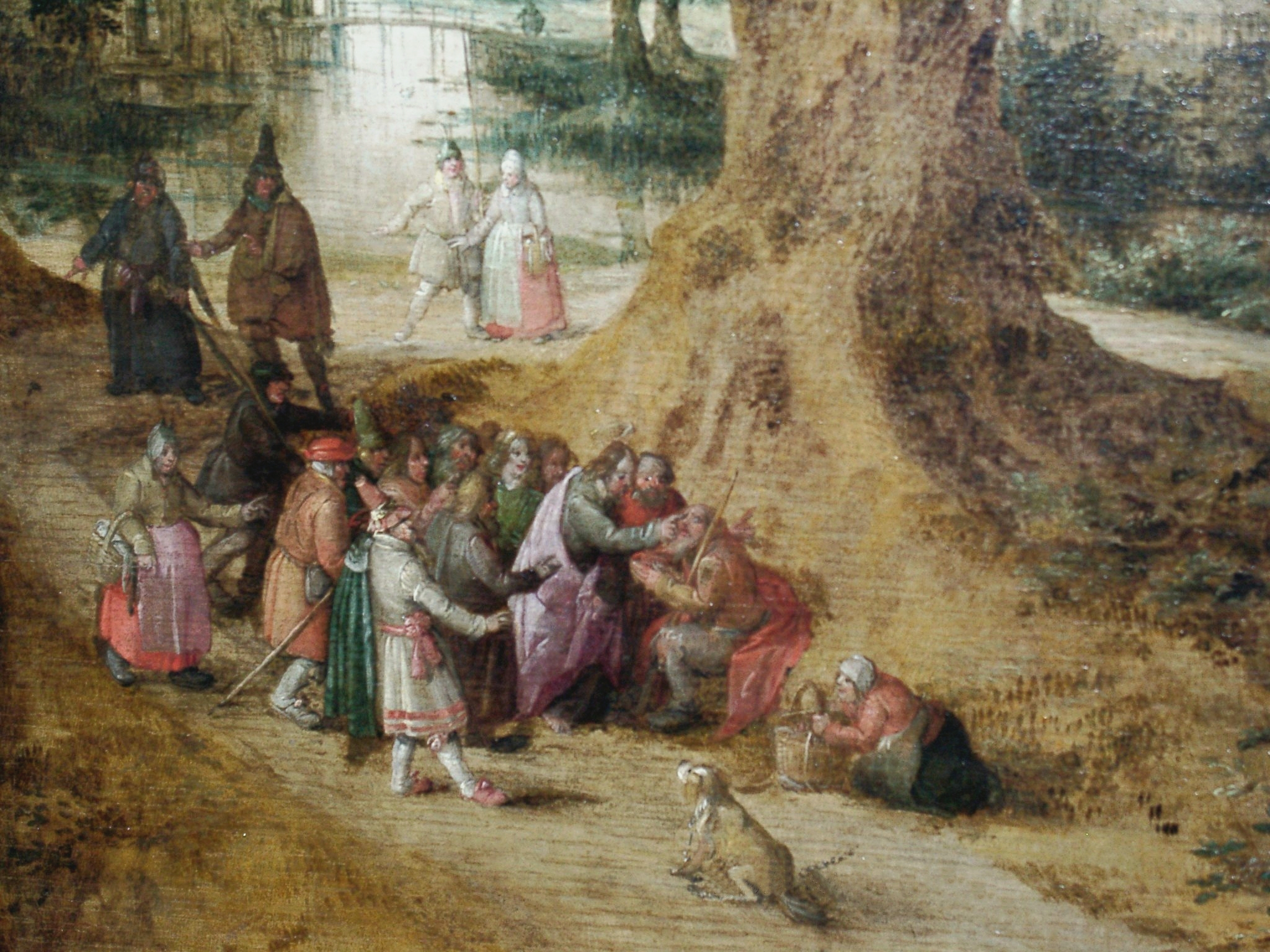

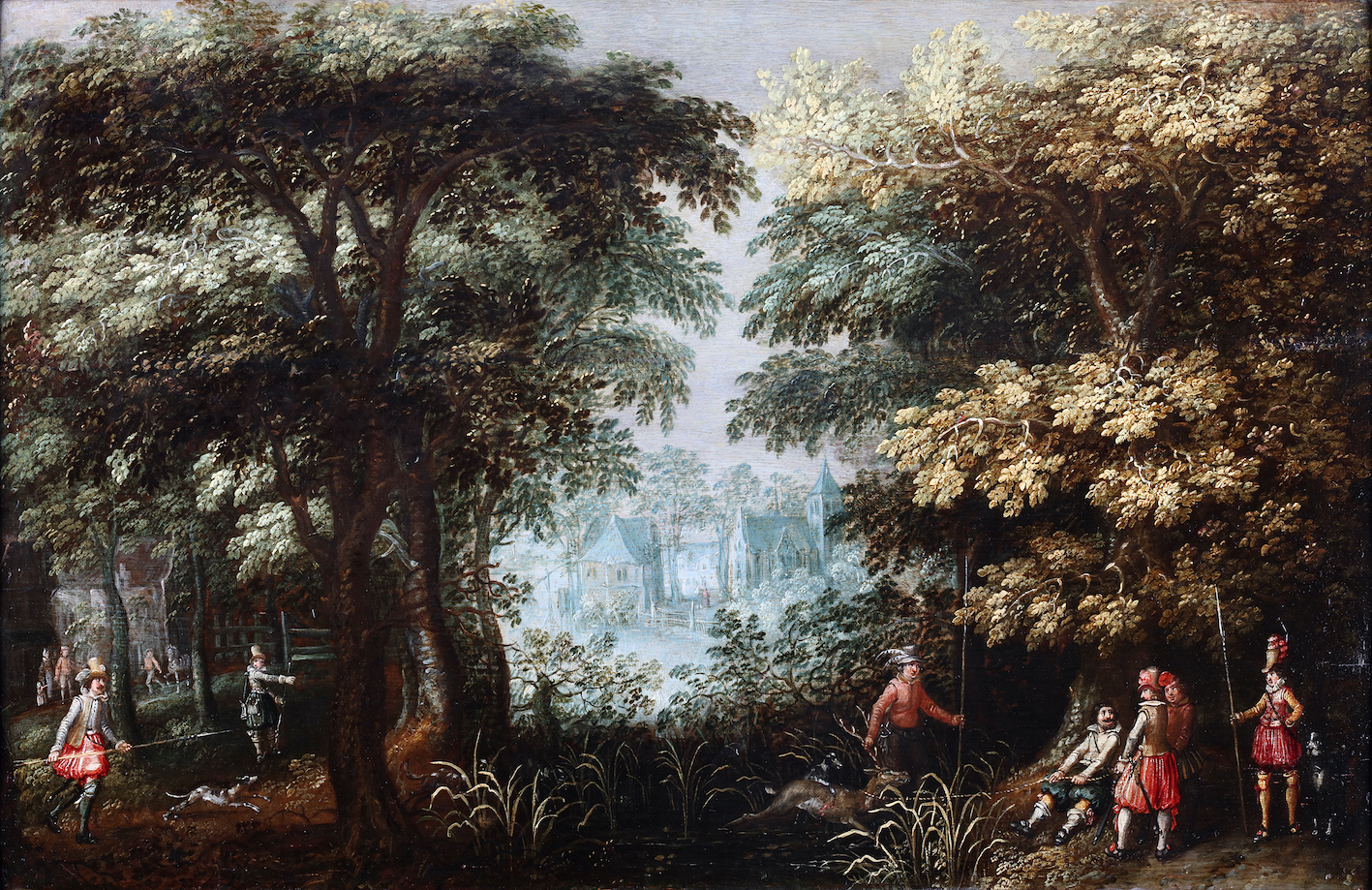

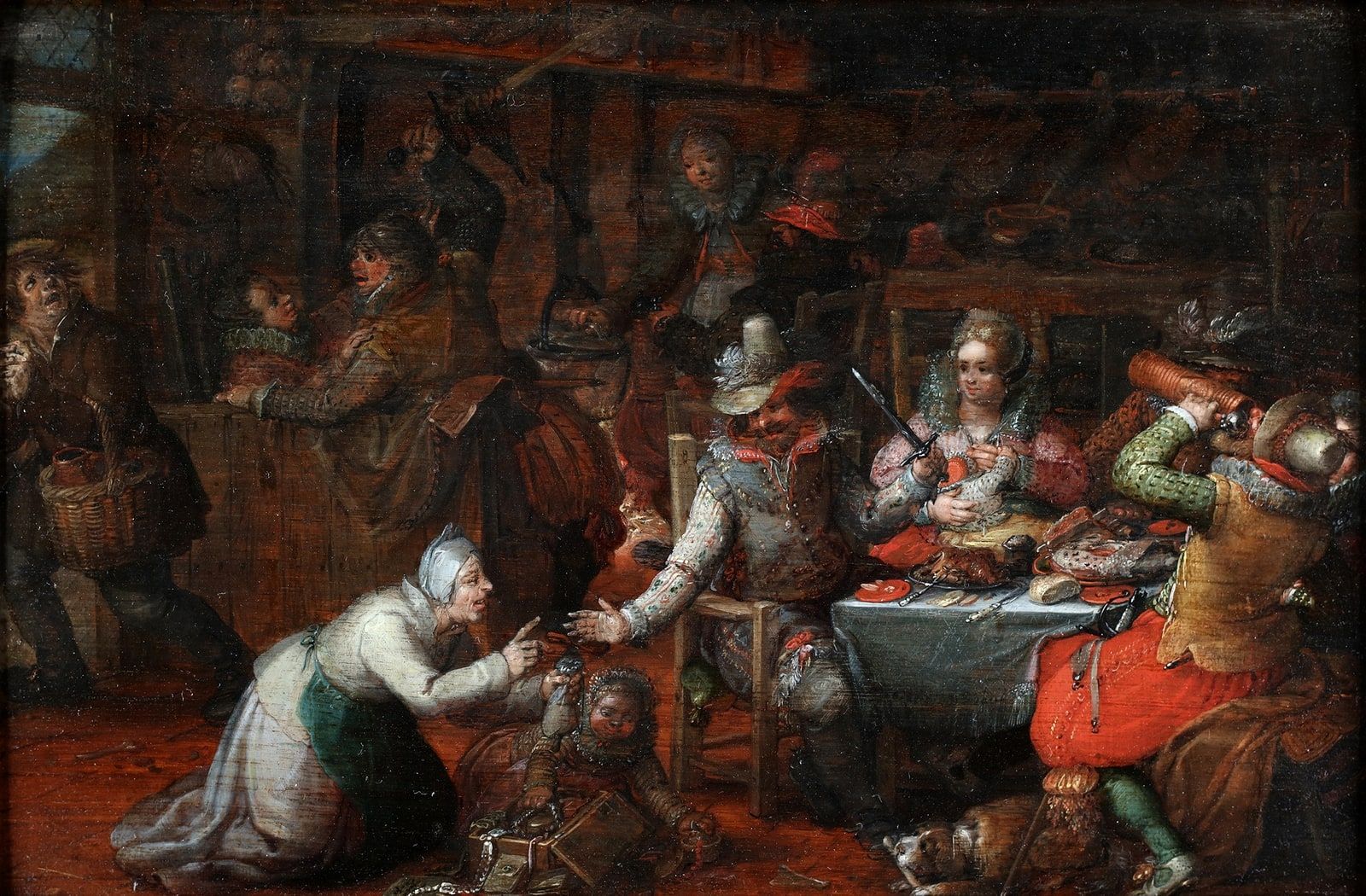

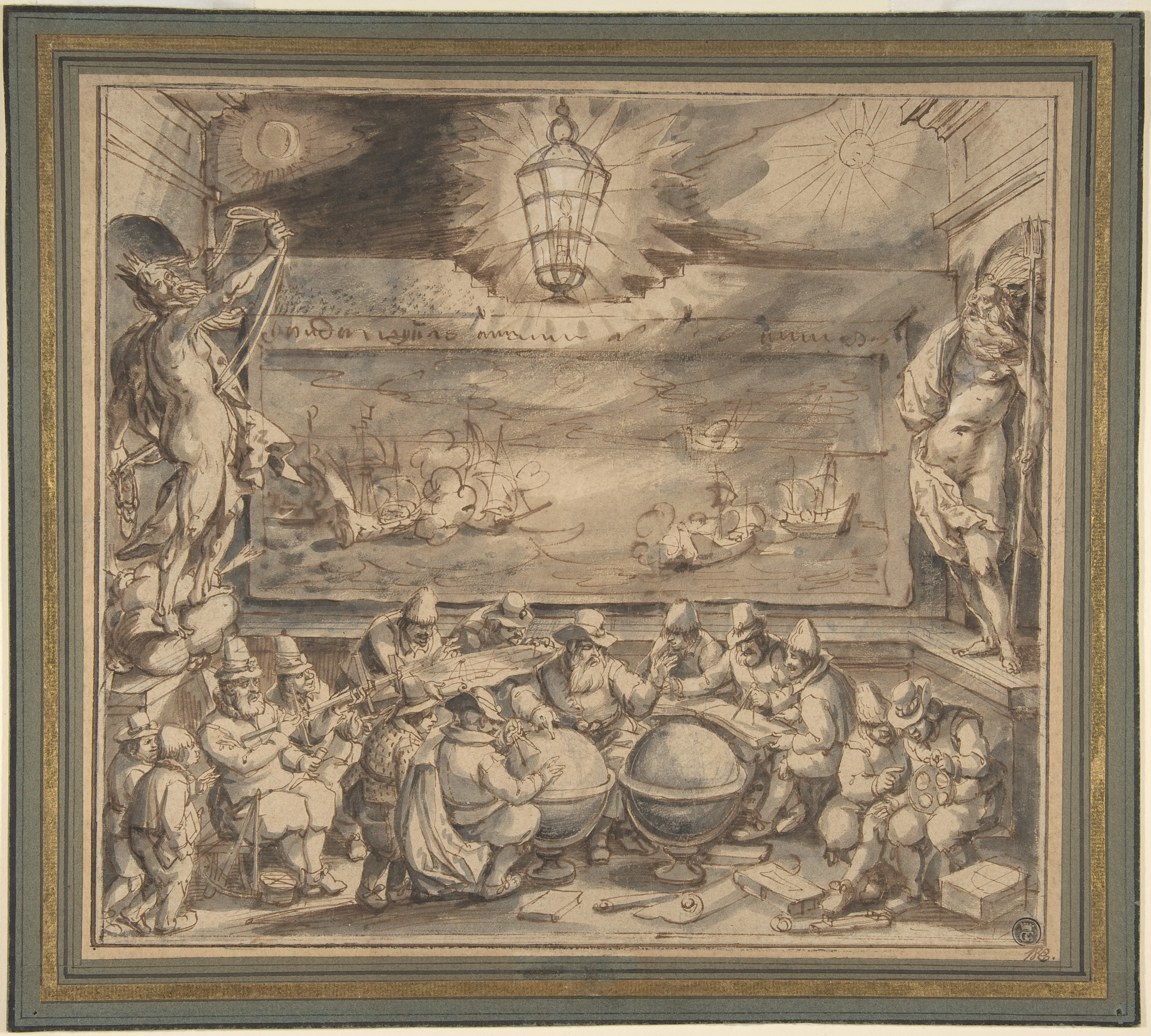
