= Kamper onion =

Type of folk tale

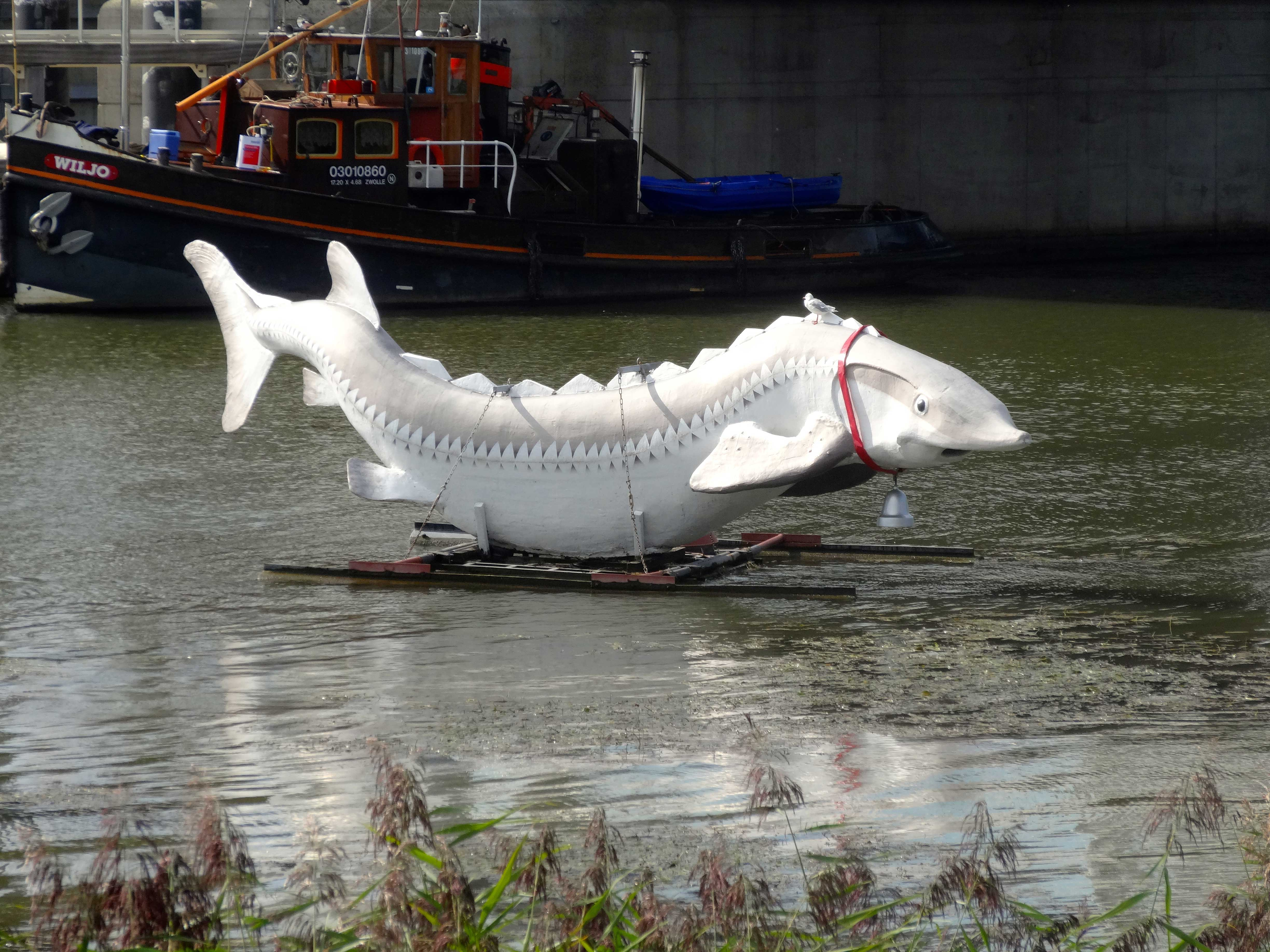
Kamper sturgeon

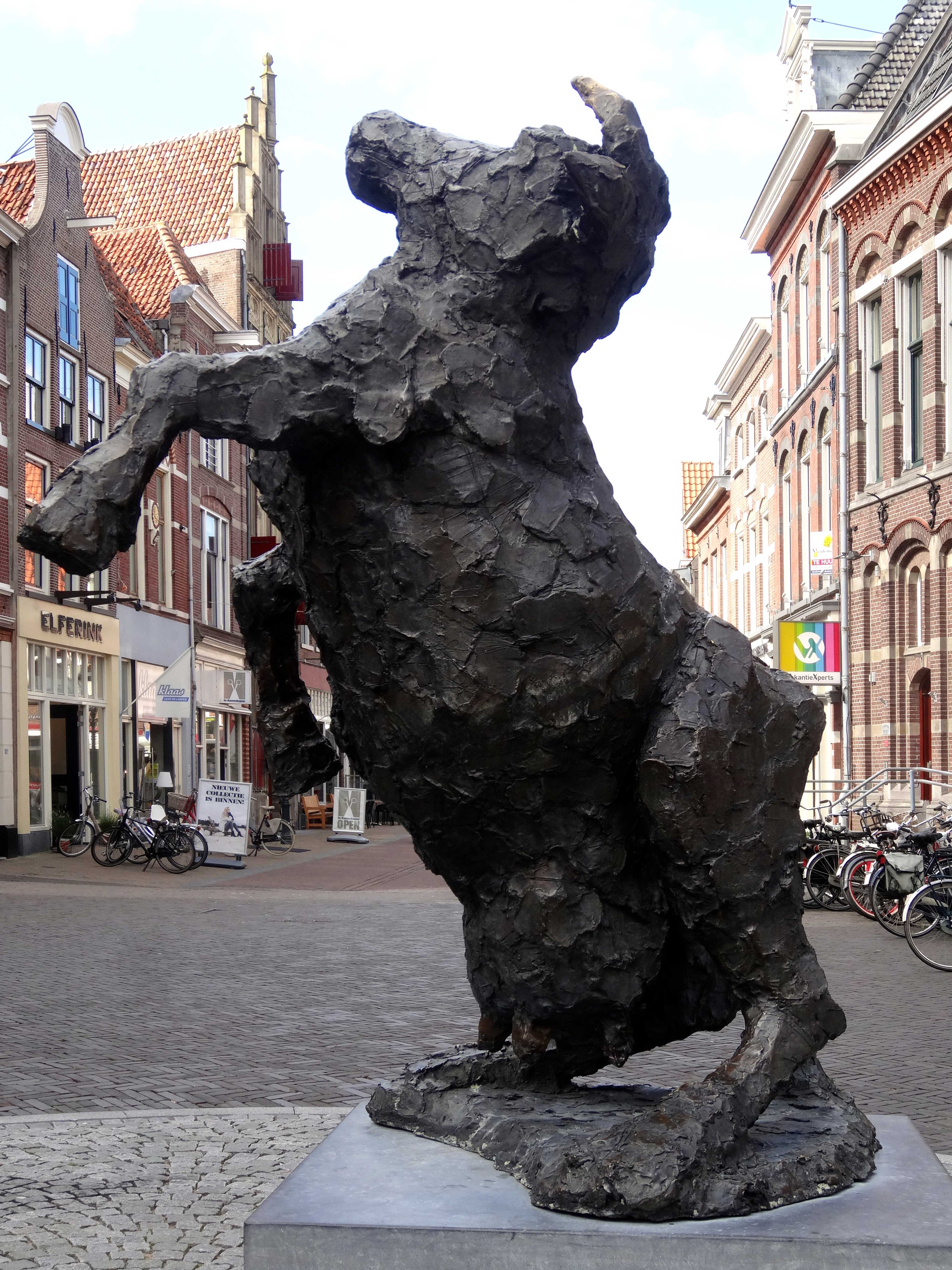
A cow from a Kamper ui hoisted by neck to graze grass on top of the New Tower

A "Kamper ui" is a Dutch term used for mock and teasing tales in which the pretensions and stupidity of the residents and especially the leaders of certain places are ridiculed by the surrounding community.

The name comes from a tale in which a vagrant convinces a farmer that he can make a tasty soup from just onion, water, and salt. In the process he adds plenty of other foodstuff, "to improve the flavor", a common Stone Soup trope.

The term "Kamper ui" has become a generic name for this type of folk tale. Nowadays, the residents of Kampen even consider it a term of endearment. Inhabitants of Kampen are also referred to as "Kamper steuren", which refers to the famous Kamper ui "The sturgeon with the bell".

About 40 different "Kamper onions" have been recorded, with many of them being variations of common motifs found in the Aarne–Thompson–Uther Index.

Such mock tales about a city or region can be found all over Europe, such as the "Cabbage Hare from Lochem" (not to be confused with the Cabbage Hare tradition), The Seven Swabians, The Expensive Executioner (Dokkum) and the Pot with Three Ears (Olen, Belgium).

Annually, during the summer period, the Kamper ui(t)dagen are organized in Kampen, with each day having its own theme. The opening of the Kamper ui(t)dagen is marked by a cow being hoisted with ropes to the Nieuwe Toren, in the presence of the mayor, referring to a famous Kamper ui.
