= Philips Vingboons =

Dutch architect

- Born: c. 1607; Amsterdam, Dutch Republic
- Died: 1678; Amsterdam, Dutch Republic
- Occupation: Architect
- Practice: Neo-classicism
- Buildings: Herengracht 168; Kloveniersburgwal 95

Philips Vingboons (or Vinckboons, Vinckeboons, Vinckbooms) (c. 1607 – 2 October 1678) was a Dutch architect. He was part of the school of Jacob van Campen, that is, Dutch Classicism. Vingboons was especially highly regarded in his native city of Amsterdam.

== Biography ==
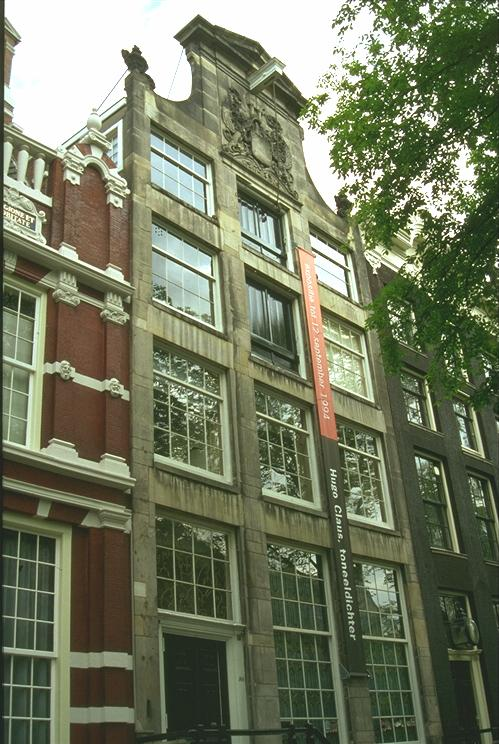
Herengracht 168

Philips Vingboons was born in circa 1607 in Amsterdam in the Dutch Republic. His father David Vinckboons was a painter from the Southern Netherlands who had fled from Antwerp to Amsterdam during the Dutch Revolt. Vingboons had nine brothers and sisters. His brother Johannes Vingboons was a painter and his brother Justus Vingboons also was an architect.

Vingboons started his career as a painter in the family business with his father and siblings, where he was educated with cartography, mathematics, architecture, and classics. He later became an architect, and he was possibly a student of the architect Jacob van Campen. He became engaged to Petronella Questiés on 21 April 1645, when he was 37 years old. He had a set of his designs engraved by his brother Jan in 1648 for the Amsterdam council, and Justus Danckerts published these in 1688. Thanks to this book, much of his work can be attributed accurately, including some designs that were not executed, such as his maquette for the Amsterdam city hall, and the buitenplaats Vredenburch in Beemster. Vingboons died in 1678 and was buried on 10 February 1678 in Amsterdam.

== Architecture ==
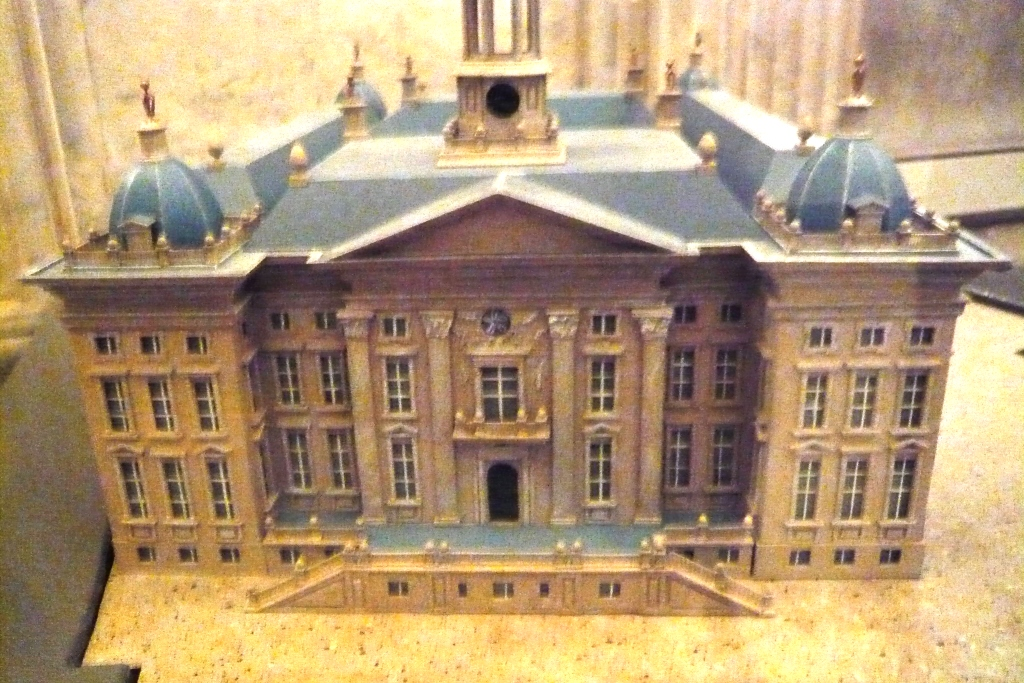
Model of his plans for the new Amsterdam City Hall (not executed - commission was awarded to Jacob van Campen)

In contrast with Jacob van Campen, Vingboons knew how to fit classicism creatively with the typically narrow city houses of Amsterdam. Philips Vingboons is well named as the inventor of the Amsterdam "Halsgevel" (literally neck front) type of facade, since in 1638 he designed the oldest surviving "Halsgevel" in Amsterdam, at Herengracht 168. Indeed, it is even sometimes called the "Vingboonsgevel" after him. It was widely imitated in the period of Dutch Classicism (1640–1665) on a grand scale. On simpler houses, it appeared as a simple brick pilaster-halsgevel, with a few restrained ornaments - this type is named a "Vingboons-imitatie" (Vingboons-imitation).

Another of his designs was Kloveniersburgwal 95, in 1642, one of the most finely proportioned classical-school city-palaces in Amsterdam. Philips Vingboons lived during the high point of Amsterdam's power and wealth, halfway through the 17th century, and became the city's most important architect and designer. He especially designed houses since, as a Catholic, he was passed over for state commissions. In 1648 and 1674 a book was published with Philips Vingboons' designs ("Afbeeldsels"), through which we have a good idea of his work.

== Works in Amsterdam ==
Description	Original function^{?}	Built	Architect	Location	Coordinates^{?}	No.^{?}	Image
Upper windows were removed in the 18th century in the widening of the walls	House	1638	Philip Vingboons	Herengracht 168	52°22′27″N 4°53′13″E	1760	
Cromhouthuizen, now Bijbels Museum	House	1660–1662	Philip Vingboons	Herengracht 364-370	52°22′07″N 4°53′11″E	1820	
Museum Het Grachtenhuis	House	1663–1665	Philip Vingboons	Herengracht 386	52°22′04″N 4°53′11″E	1828	
Canal house	House	1664–1667	Philip Vingboons	Herengracht 412	52°22′01″N 4°53′14″E		
Huis Deutz	House	1663	Philip Vingboons	Herengracht 450	52°21′56″N 4°21′57″E	1853	
The Eagle (Arend), former headquarters NHM	House	1669	Philip Vingboons	Herengracht 466	52°21′55″N 4°53′26″E	1861	
Canal house	House	1639	Philip Vingboons	Keizersgracht 319	52°22′11″N 4°53′06″E	2308	
Canal House	House	1664–1665	Philip Vingboons	Keizersgracht 577	52°21′51″N 4°53′28″E		Upload Photo
Canal House	House	1661	Philip Vingboons	Prinsengracht 92	52°22′38″N 4°53′06″E	4512	
Bambeeck House called "The Star"	House	1650	Philip Vingboons	Kloveniersburgwal 77	52°22′10″N 4°53′52″E	2993	
Het Poppenhuis	House	1642	Philip Vingboons	Kloveniersburgwal 95	52°22′09″N 4°53′51″E	2998	
Canal house	House	1646	Philip Vingboons	Rokin 95	52°22′09″N 4°53′51″E	4994	Upload Photo
Canal houses formerly used by St. Pietersgasthuis	House	1641–1643	Philip Vingboons	Rokin/Oude Turfmarkt 145-147	52°22′03″N 4°53′37″E	5786	
3 Canal houses	House	1639	Philip Vingboons	Singel 282-286	52°22′03″N 4°53′05″E	5339	
Neurenberg / Odeon	House	1662	Philip Vingboons	Singel 460	52°22′03″N 4°53′20″E	5408	
Huydecoper house (bombed in 1943)	House	1639–1642	Philip Vingboons	Singel 548	52°22′01″N 4°53′37″E		
Jacob's Ladder, Canal house named for its gable stone with Jacob's dream	House	1639–1642	Philip Vingboons	Oudezijds Voorburgwal 316A	52°22′11″N 4°53′40″E	6161	
Weaver's house Noortsche Bos	House	1670–1671	Philip Vingboons	Eerste Weteringdwarsstraat	52°22′11″N 4°53′40″E	6353	Upload Photo
Begijnhof Chapel of St. John and St. Ursula	Church	1671–1672	Philip Vingboons	Begijnhof	52°22′11″N 4°53′25″E	368	

== Other works ==
Vingboons designed country homes for Amsterdam regency members such as Driemond, near Weesp, 1642, Havezate Rollecate near Vollenhove, circa 1654, Westwijk for Reinier Pauw de Jonge (1637) in Purmer, Nijenhuis and Peckendam near Diepenheim, 1656, Gansenhoef in Maarssen, Vanenburg for Hendrik van Eessen near Harderwijk, 1664, Borg Nittersum for Joan Clant in Stedum, and Harsveld in Ootmarsum.

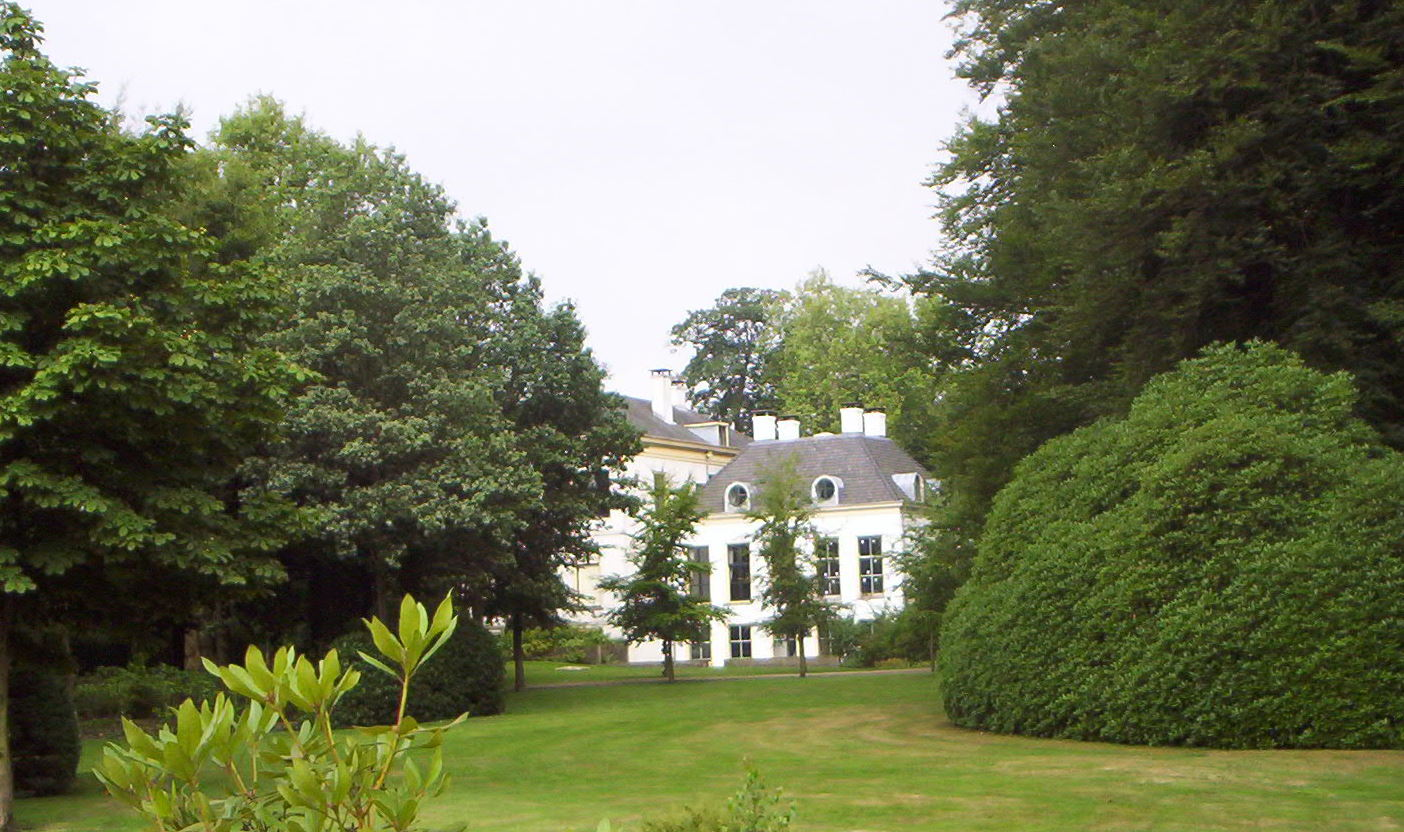
Buitenplaats Pijnenburg (1647) in Lage Vuursche

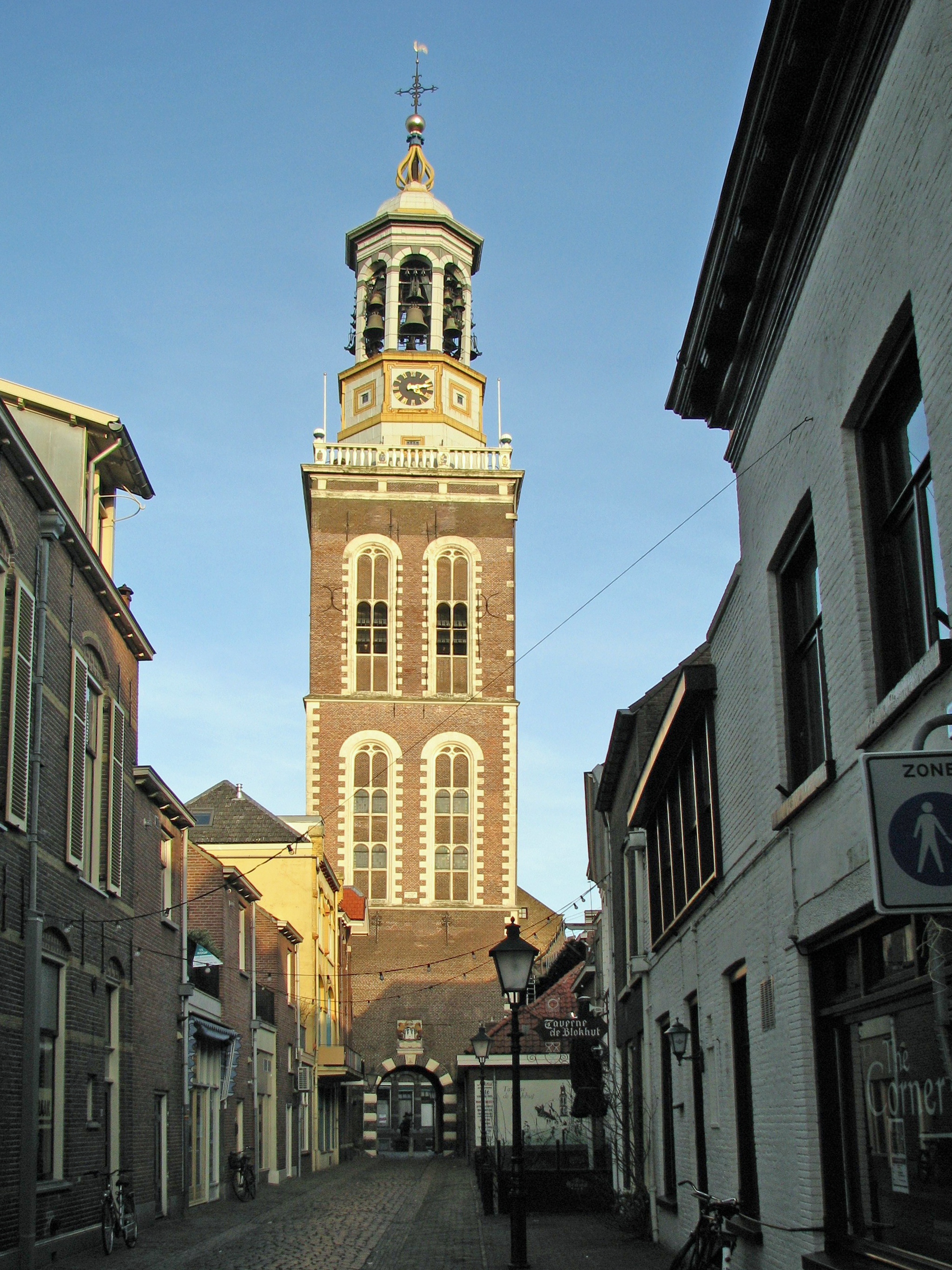
The Nieuwe Toren, Kampen, 1649–1664 in Overijssel

== Sources ==
- Bureau Monumentenzorg Amsterdam
- Koen Ottenheym, Philips Vingboons (1607–1678), architect, Zutphen, 1989, ISBN 90-6011-626-7
- Jacobine E. Huisken, Friso Lammertse, Het kunstbedrijf van de familie Vingboons. Schilders, architecten en kaartmakers in de gouden eeuw, Maarssen, 1989, ISBN 90-6179-073-5
- Jacqueline Heijenbrok, Guido Steenmeijer, Een stadswandeling langs de huizen van Philips en Justus Vingboons, Den Haag/Amsterdam, 1989, ISBN 90-6179-077-8
