= Justus Vingboons =

Dutch architect

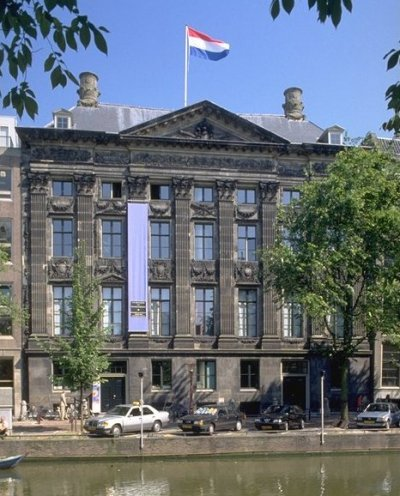
The Trippenhuis

Justus Vingboons (or Vinckboons, Vinckeboons) (c. 1620 – c. 1698) was an Amsterdam architect. He was the brother of the better-known architect Philips Vingboons. Like his brother, Justus built in the "Dutch Classicism" style.

== Works ==
The most important work of Vingboons is Kloveniersburgwal 29 (the Trippenhuis), in which Dutch Classicism finds its purest and richest expression. The entire sandstone front has been given very detailed decoration and has eight colossal Corinthian pilasters.

Examples of other houses attributed to Justus Vingboons include Herengracht 257 (1661) and Herengracht 390-392 (1665). He also drew the facade of the House of Nobility in Stockholm during his visit there 1653–1656.

== Sources ==
- Bureau Monumentenzorg Amsterdam
- Jacobine E. Huisken, Friso Lammertse, Het kunstbedrijf van de familie Vingboons. Schilders, architecten en kaartmakers in de gouden eeuw, Maarssen, 1989, ISBN 90-6179-073-5
- Jacqueline Heijenbrok, Guido Steenmeijer, Een stadswandeling langs de huizen van Philips en Justus Vingboons, Den Haag/Amsterdam, 1989, ISBN 90-6179-077-8
