= Simeone Ciburri =

Italian painter

Simeone Ciburri (active 1591–1624) was an Italian painter of the early-Baroque period. Born in Perugia, where he painted in the style of Federico Barocci, although maybe a pupil of Benedetto Bandiera. The stylistic similarities between Ciburri and Bandiera led to confusion over the attribution of several paintings. Art historian Vittorio Casale distinguished Ciburri's work by its simpler compositions, stockier figures and stronger emphasis on colour.

Ciburri died in 1624 and was buried on 4 January of that year in the church of the confraternity of Santa Maria dei Laici in Gubbio.

He painted for the following churches:

- Santa Maria degli Angeli, Assisi
- San Francesco del Monte, Perugia
- Perugia Cathedral

== Assisi ==
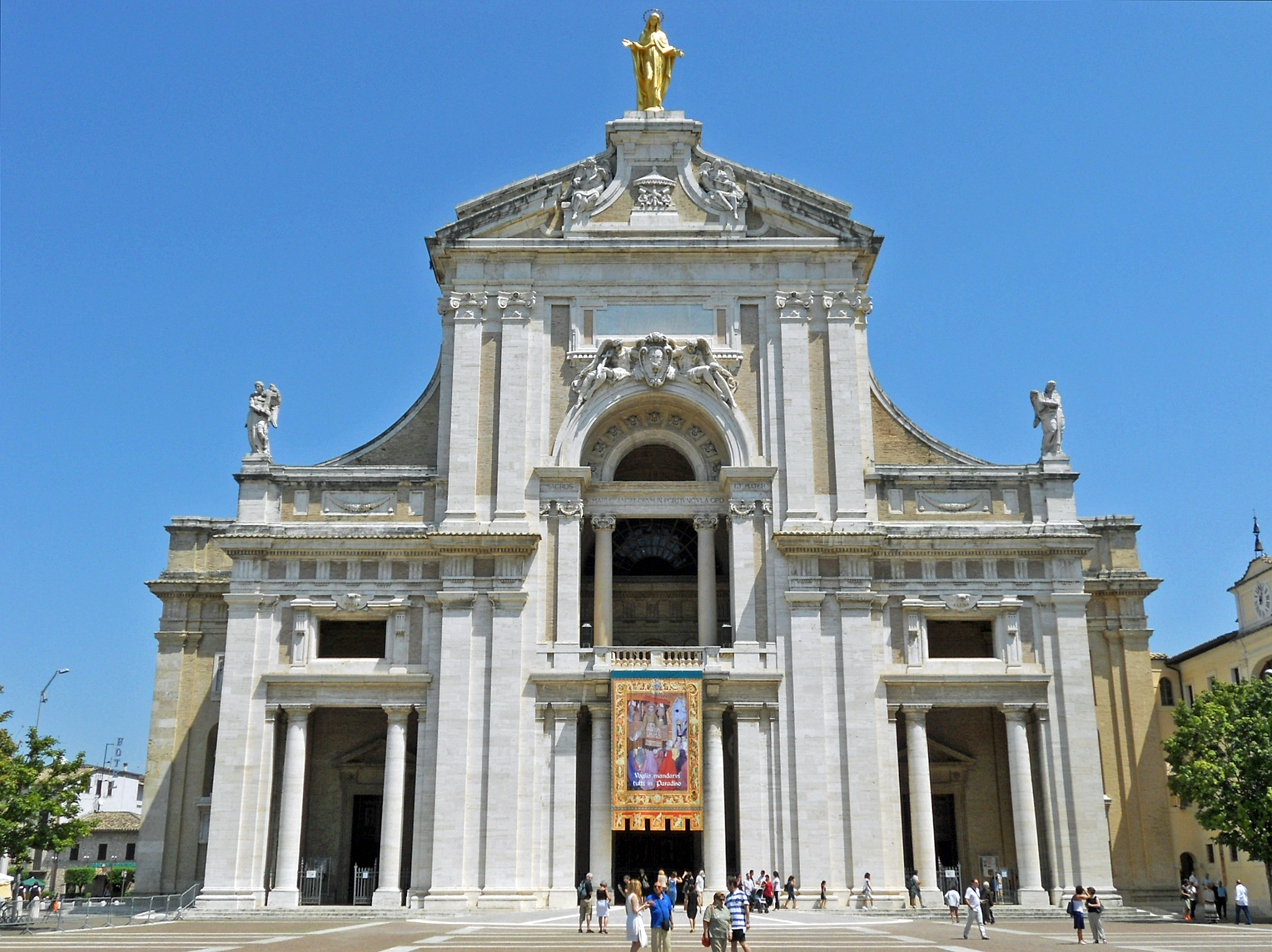
The Basilica of Santa Maria degli Angeli in Assisi, where Ciburri decorated the Chapel of the Coronation of the Virgin in 1603

In 1603, Ciburri painted the altarpiece and decorated the walls and vault of the Chapel of the Coronation of the Virgin. His altarpiece, the Assumption and Coronation of the Virgin, was based on the Madonna of Monteluce, an altarpiece commissioned from Raphael and completed by Giulio Romano and Gianfrancesco Penni. Ciburri's paintings on the side walls depict Saint Diego of Alcalá healing the son of the King of Spain and an apparition of Saints Francis and Clare.

The Madonna of Monteluce by Giulio Romano and Gianfrancesco Penni, the model for Ciburri's 1603 altarpiece in Assisi

== Perugia and other Umbrian towns ==
Ciburri's altarpiece of Saint Diego of Alcalá, painted around 1600 for San Francesco al Monte in Perugia, entered the Galleria Nazionale dell'Umbria. His painting of the martyrdom of Saint Herculanus for Perugia Cathedral includes a view of the city's walls and the church of Sant'Ercolano.

A 1605 altarpiece of the Madonna and Child with the Young Saint John the Baptist and Saints Nicholas of Bari and Francis of Assisi, attributed to Ciburri, is held at the San Francesco museum in Montefalco. It was formerly in San Francesco al Prato in Perugia. In Panicale, a painting by Ciburri at the church of the Madonna della Sbarra shows Santa Maria degli Angeli under construction.
