= Federico Barocci =

Italian painter (1535–1612)

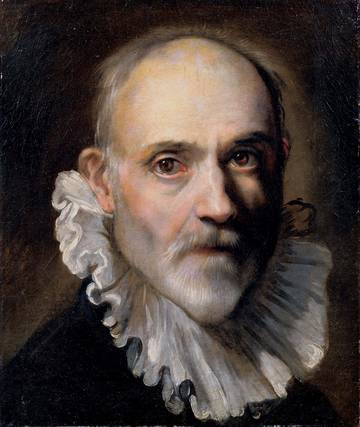
- Self-portrait (c. 1600)
- Born: c. 1535; Urbino, Duchy of Urbino
- Died: 30 September 1612; Urbino, Duchy of Urbino
- Known for: Painting
- Notable work: The Communion of the Apostles
- Movement: Renaissance; Mannerism

Federico Barocci (also written Barozzi) (c. 1535 – 30 September 1612) was an Italian Renaissance painter and printmaker. His original name was Federico Fiori, and he was nicknamed Il Baroccio. His work was highly esteemed and influential, and foreshadows the Baroque works of Rubens. He is generally considered the greatest and most individual painter of his time in central Italy.

== Early life and training ==
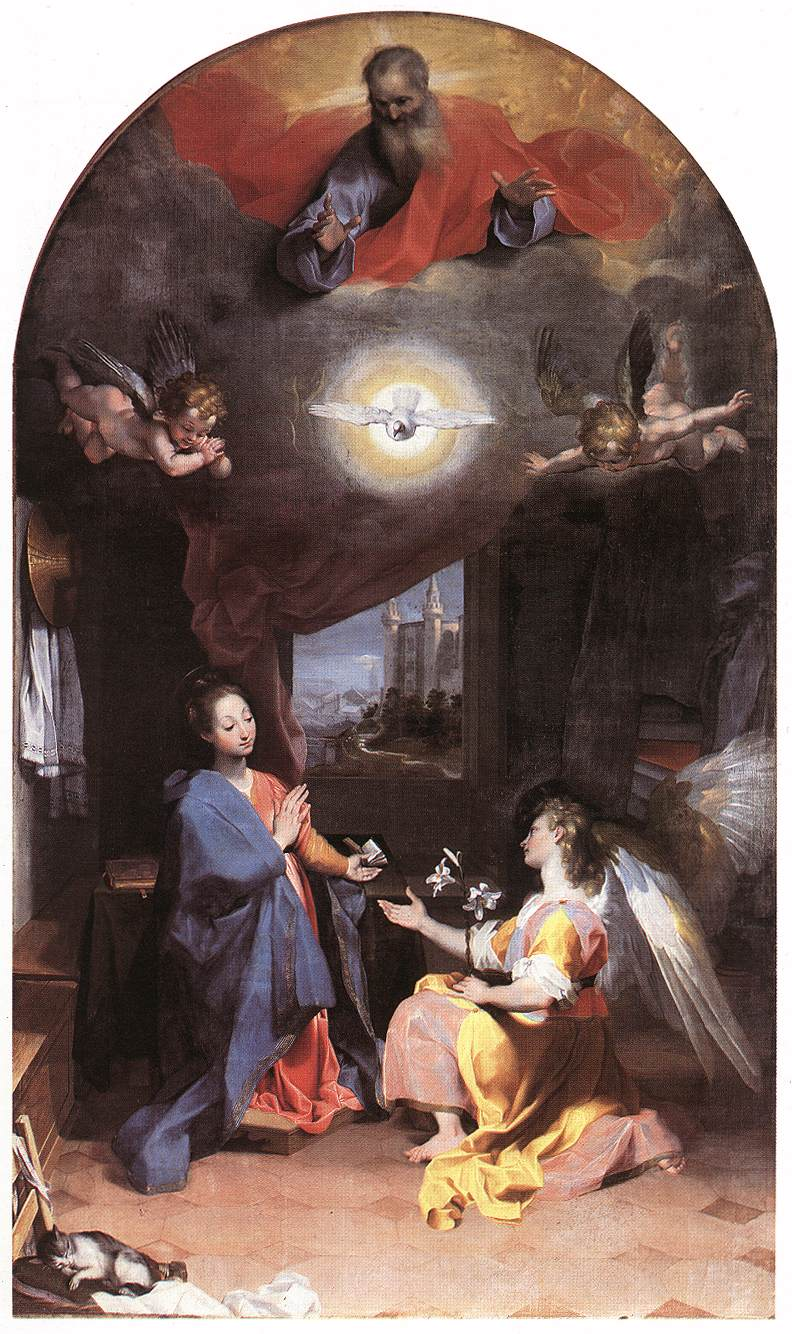
Annunciation (1592–96) Oil on canvas, Santa Maria degli Angeli, Perugia.

He was born at Urbino, Duchy of Urbino, and received his earliest apprenticeship with his father, Ambrogio Barocci, a sculptor of some local eminence. He was then apprenticed with the painter Battista Franco Veneziano in Urbino. He accompanied his uncle, Bartolommeo Genga, to Pesaro, then in 1548 to Rome, where he worked in the pre-eminent studio of the day, that of the Mannerist painters, Taddeo and Federico Zuccari.

== Mature work in Rome and Urbino ==
After passing four years at Rome, he returned to his native city, where his first work of art was a St. Margaret executed for the Confraternity of the Holy Sacrament. He was invited back to Rome by Pope Pius IV to assist in the decoration of the Vatican Belvedere Palace at Rome, where he painted the Virgin Mary and infant, with several Saints and a ceiling in fresco, representing the Annunciation.

During this second sojourn, while completing the decorations for the Vatican, Barocci fell ill with intestinal complaints. He suspected that a salad which he had eaten had been poisoned by jealous rivals. Fearing his illness was terminal, he left Rome in 1563; four years later he was said to experience a partial remission after prayers to the Virgin. Barocci henceforth often complained of frail health, though he remained productive for nearly four decades more. While he is described by contemporaries as personally somewhat morose and hypochondriacal, his paintings are lively and brilliant. Although he continued to have major altarpiece commissions from afar, he never returned to Rome, and was mainly patronised in his native city by Francesco Maria II della Rovere, duke of Urbino. The Ducal Palace can be seen in the background of his paintings, rendered in a forced perspective that seems a holdover from Mannerism.

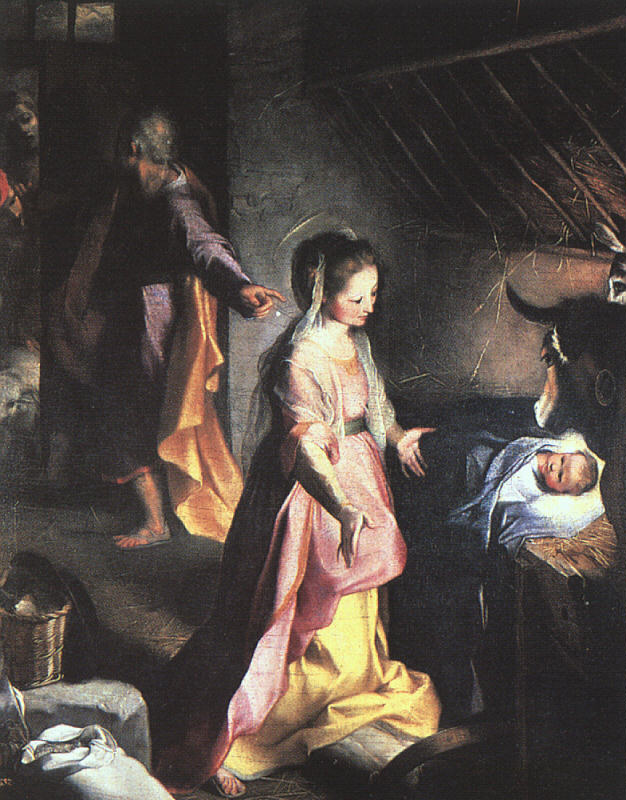
Nativity, 1597, oil on canvas, Museo del Prado, Madrid

While Barocci was removed from Rome, the fulcrum of artistic fame and influence, he continued to innovate in his style. At some point, he may have seen coloured chalk/pastel drawings by Correggio, but Barocci's remarkable pastel studies are the earliest examples of the technique to survive. In pastels and in oil sketches (another technique he pioneered), Barocci's soft, opalescent renderings evoke the ethereal. Such studies were part of a complex process Barocci used to complete his altarpieces. An organised series of steps leading up to the final product ensured its speed and success in execution. Barocci did innumerable sketches: gestural, compositional, figural studies (using models), lighting studies (using clay models), perspective studies, colour studies, nature studies, etc. Today, over 2,000 drawings by him are extant. Every detail of his subsequent cartoons for canvases was worked out in this way. A good example is his famed Madonna del Popolo (Uffizi). It is a vortex of colour and vitality, made possible by the great variety of people, poses, perspectives, natural details, colors, lighting and atmospheric effects. There are many surviving drawings for the Madonna del Popolo, from initial sketches to colour studies of heads, to the final full-size cartoon. Despite this painstaking process, Barocci's genius kept the brushstrokes passionate and liberated, and a spiritual light seems to flicker as a jewel across faces, hands, drapery, and sky.

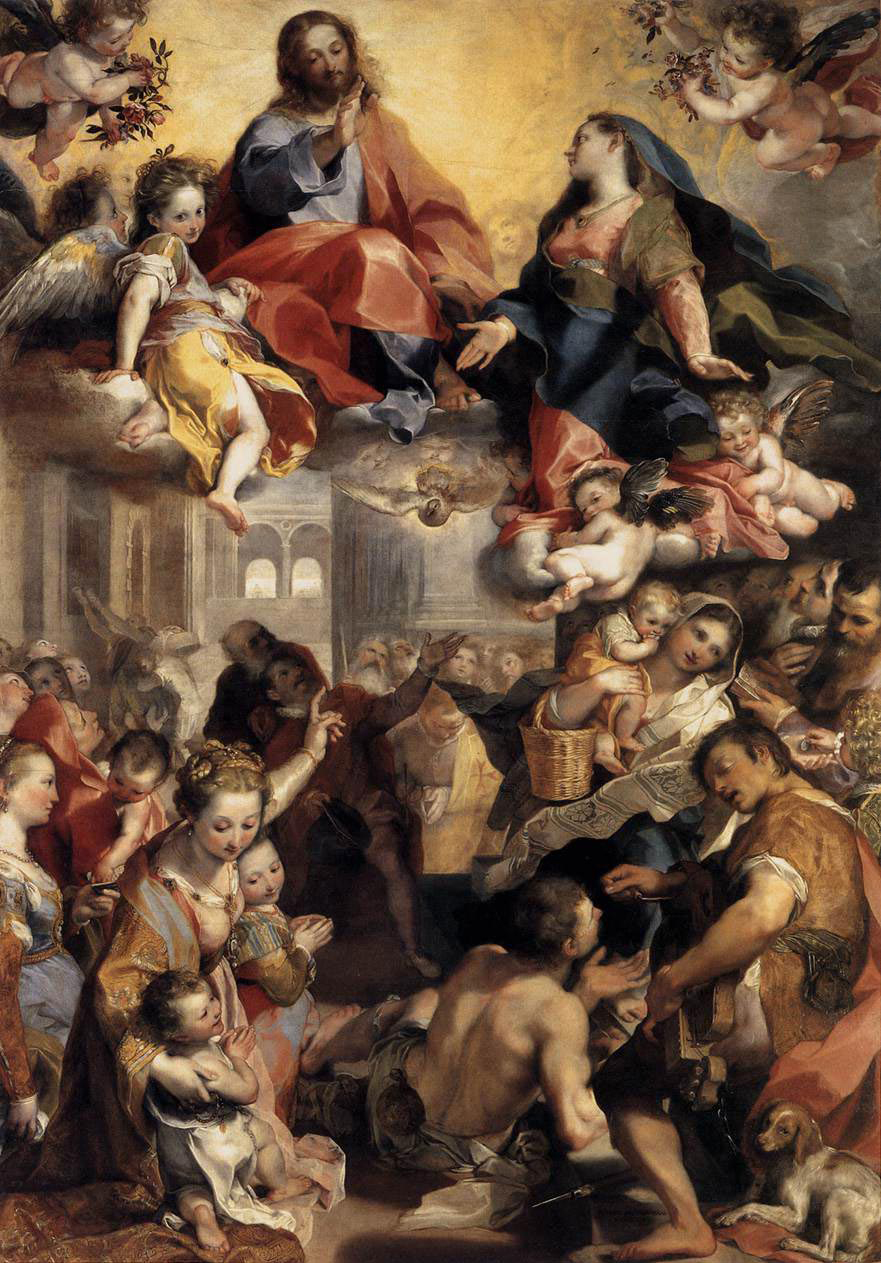
Federico Barocci, Madonna del Popolo, 1579

Barocci's embrace of the Counter Reformation would shape his long and fruitful career. By 1566, he joined a lay order of Capuchins, an offshoot of Franciscans. He may have been influenced by Saint Philip Neri, whose Oratorians sought to reconnect the spiritual realm with the lives of everyday people. Neri, who was somewhat ambivalent about the accumulating richness of his Santa Maria in Vallicella, commissioned two completed works from Barocci, the pre-eminent artist of these large pious altarpieces: The Visitation (1583–6) and Presentation of the Virgin (1593–94). Neri is said to have been moved to ecstasy by Barocci's accomplishment in the former painting, which shows the Virgin and Elizabeth greeting each other.

In Urbino, where he painted a Descent from the Cross for the cathedral of San Lorenzo at Perugia. He again visited Rome during the papacy of Gregory XIII when he painted two admirable pictures for the Chiesa Nuova, representing the Visitation of the Virgin Mary to Elisabeth and the Presentation in the Temple, and for the Chiesa della Minerva, a Last Supper.

== Critical assessment and legacy ==
The artist biographer Giovanni Pietro Bellori, the Baroque equivalent of Giorgio Vasari, considered Barocci to be among the finest painters of his time. Barocci's emotive brushwork was not lost on Peter Paul Rubens when he was in Italy. Rubens is known to have made a sketch of his dramatic Martyrdom of St Vitale, in which the martyr's undulating flesh is the eye of another whirlwind of figures, gestures, and drama. Also, Rubens' The Martyrdom of St Livinus seems to owe much to Barocci, from the putto with the pointing palm frond to the presence of dogs in the lower right corner. Among the painters and artists who worked under Barocci are Antonio Cimatori (Visacci), Ventura Mazza, Antonio Viviani (il Sordo di Urbino), Giovanni Andrea Urbani, Alessandro Vitali, and finally Felice and Vincenzo Pellegrini. Barocci also had many who followed or were strongly influenced by his style, including Nicolo Martinelli (il Trometta), Giovanni Battista Lombardelli, Domenico Malpiedi, Cesare & Basilio Maggeri, Filippo Bellini, Giovanni Laurentini (Arrigoni), Giorgio Picchi, Giovanni Giacomo Pandolfi, Pietro Paolo Tamburini, Terenzio d’Urbino (il Rondolino), Giulio Cesare Begni, Benedetto Marini, Girolamo Cialdieri, Giovanni Battista Urbinelli, Alfonso Patanazzi, Gian Ortensio Bertuzzi, Cesare Franchi (il Pollino), Silla Piccinini, Benedetto Bandiera, Matteuccio Salvucci, Simeone Ciburri, Pietro Rancanelli, Onofrio Marini, Alessandro Brunelli, and Francesco Baldelli.

Barocci's swirling composition and the focus on the emotional and spiritual are elements that foreshadow the Baroque of Rubens. But even in Federico's Proto-Baroque Beata Michelina can see the makings of Bernini's High Baroque masterpiece Ecstasy of St Theresa.

== Partial list of works ==
Painting	Date	Site	Image link
Martyrdom of St Sebastian	1557	Urbino Cathedral	
Madonna di San Simone	1567	Galleria Nazionale delle Marche, Urbino	
Deposition	1567–69	Perugia Cathedral	
Rest on the Flight into Egypt	c. 1573	Pinacoteca Vaticana, Vatican	
Nativity	1597	Museo del Prado, Madrid	
The Vision of St Francis		San Francesco, Urbino	
Madonna del Popolo	1575–79	Uffizi, Florence	
Entombment	1580-2	Chiesa della Croce, Senigallia	
Martyrdom of San Vitale	1583	Pinacoteca di Brera, Milan	
Portrait of a Young Man	c. 1580–85	Musée des Beaux-Arts de Strasbourg	
Circumcision		Paris	
Annunciation	1592–96	Basilica of Santa Maria degli Angeli, Assisi, Perugia	
Aeneas' Flight from Troy	1598	Galleria Borghese, Rome	
St Jerome	1598	Galleria Borghese, Rome	
Portrait of Francisco II della Rovere	1572	Uffizi, Florence	
Christ and Mary Magdalen (Noli me tangere)	1590	Gemaldegalerie, Munich	
Entombment (etching)	1579–1582	Getty Museum, Los Angeles	
Quintilia Fischeri	c. 1600	National Gallery of Art, Washington, D.C.	
Annunciation (etching)			
St Francis receives the stigmata (drawing)		Accademia Carrara, Bergamo	
Madonna with Sts Simon and Jude		Galleria Nazionale delle Marche, Urbino	
Vocation of Saints Peter and Andrew	1586	Royal Museums of Fine Arts of Belgium	
Madonna and Child with the Infant John the Baptist and St Joseph (Madonna with the Cat)	c. 1575	National Gallery, London	
Communion of the Apostles	c. 1603~1608	Santa Maria sopra Minerva, Rome	

Drawings by Federico Barocci photographed by Paolo Monti

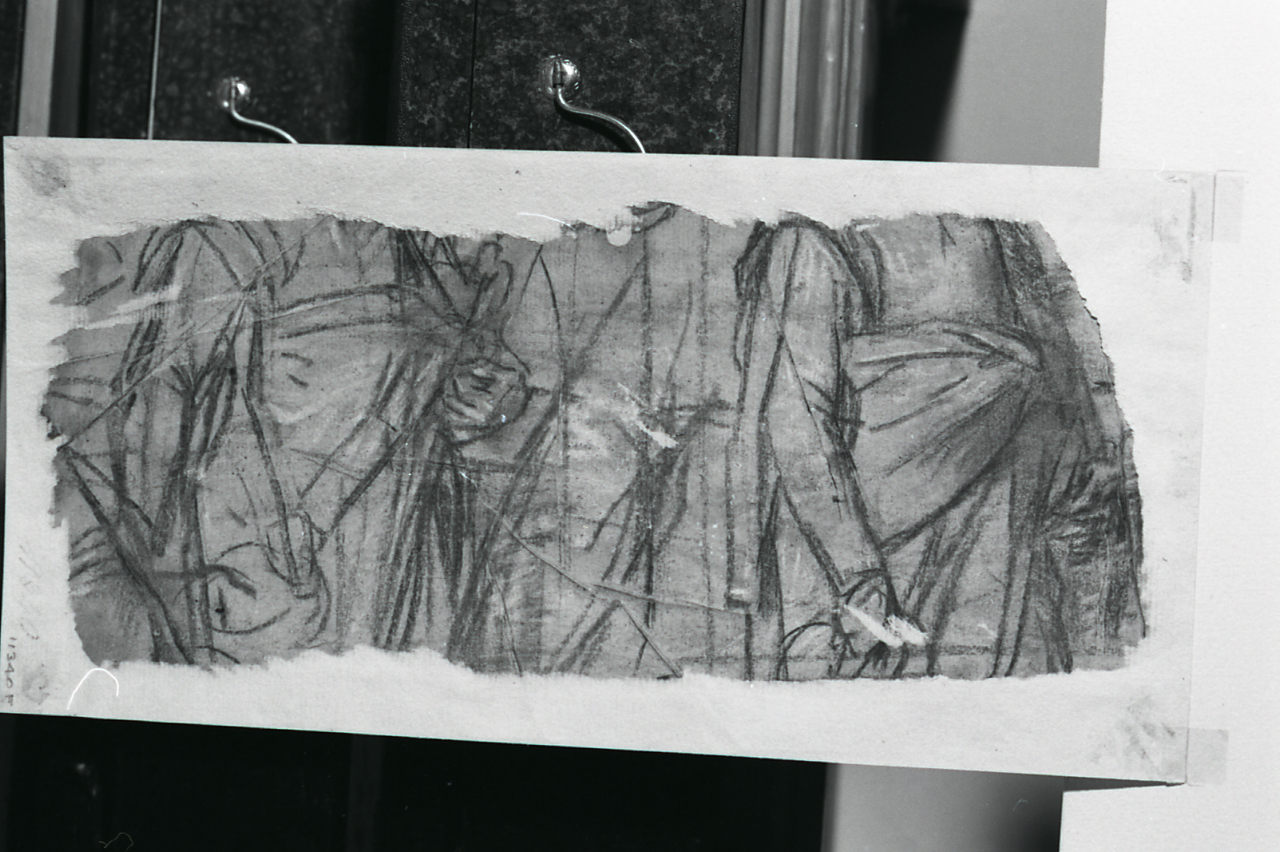

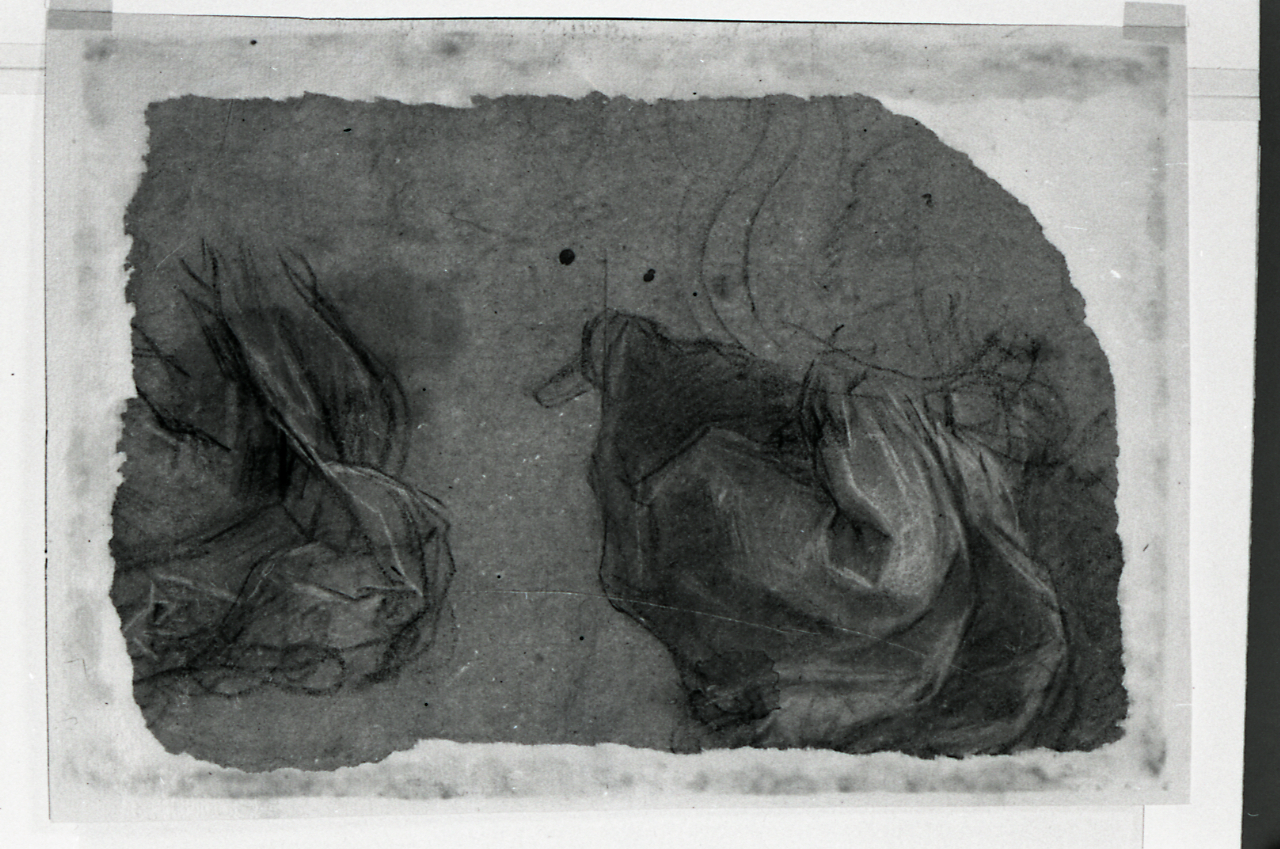

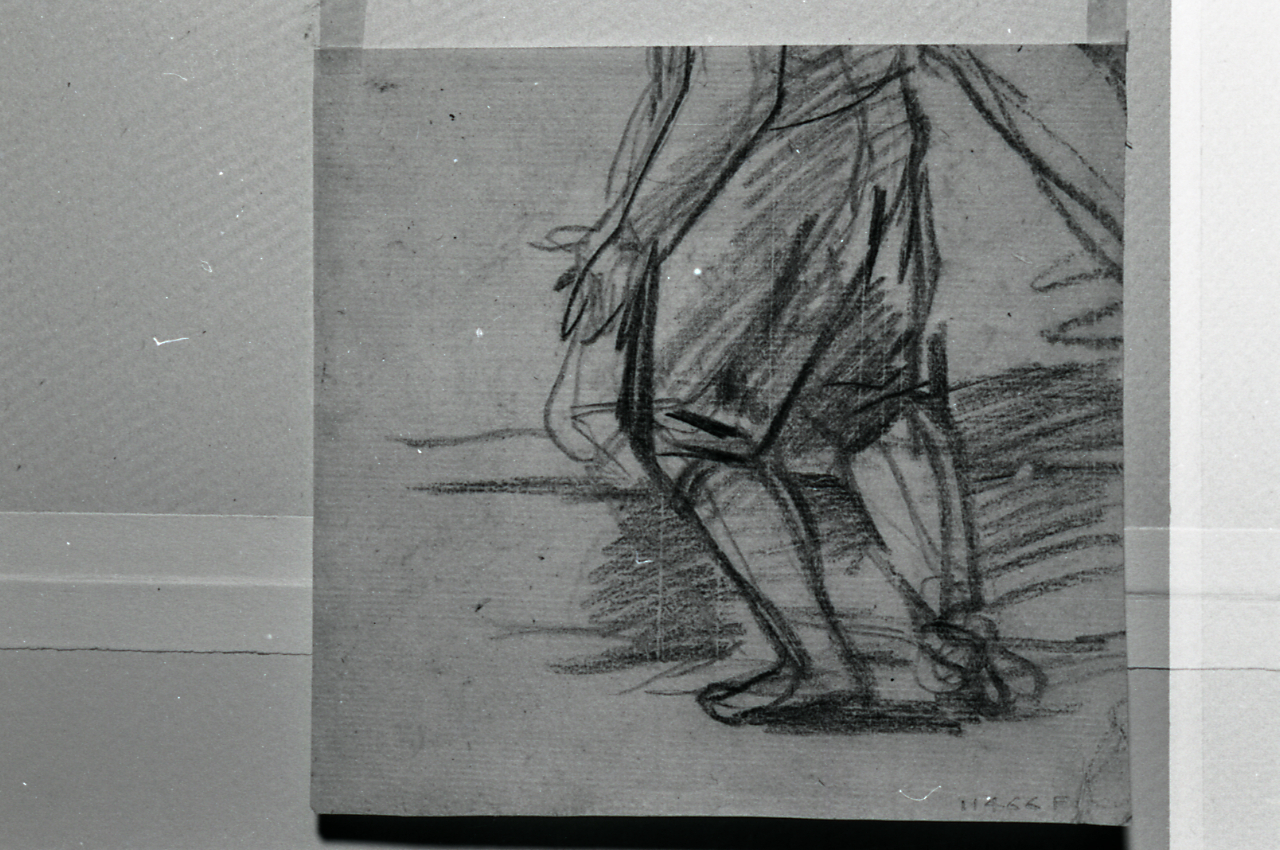

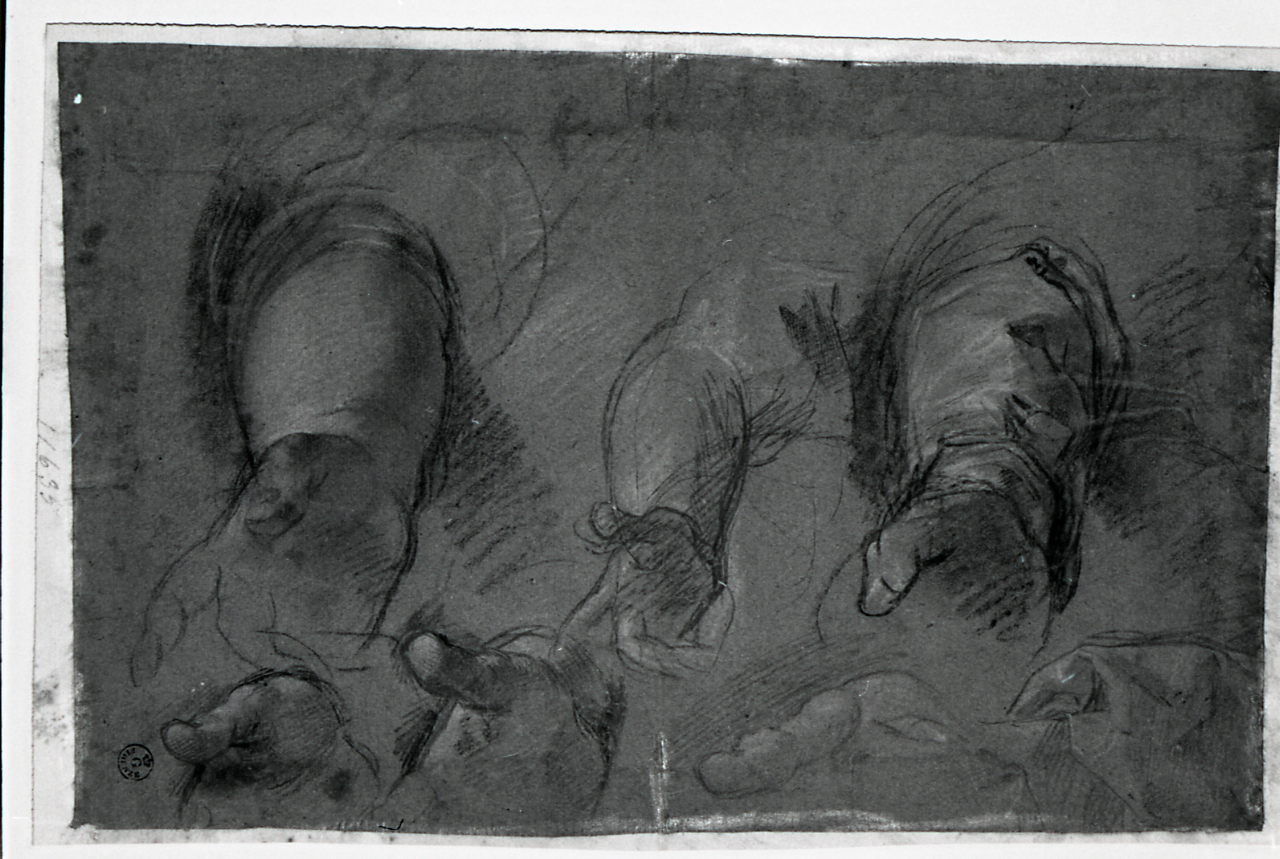

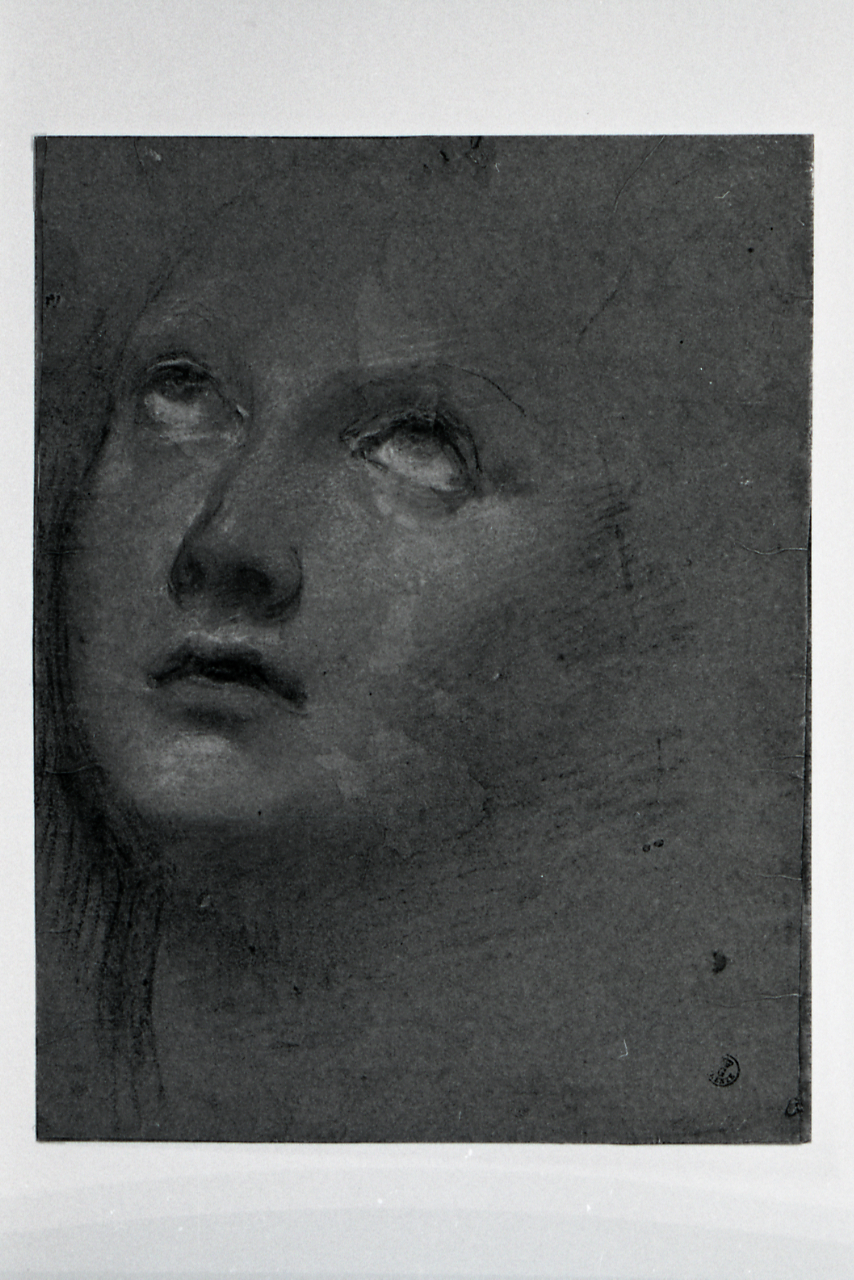

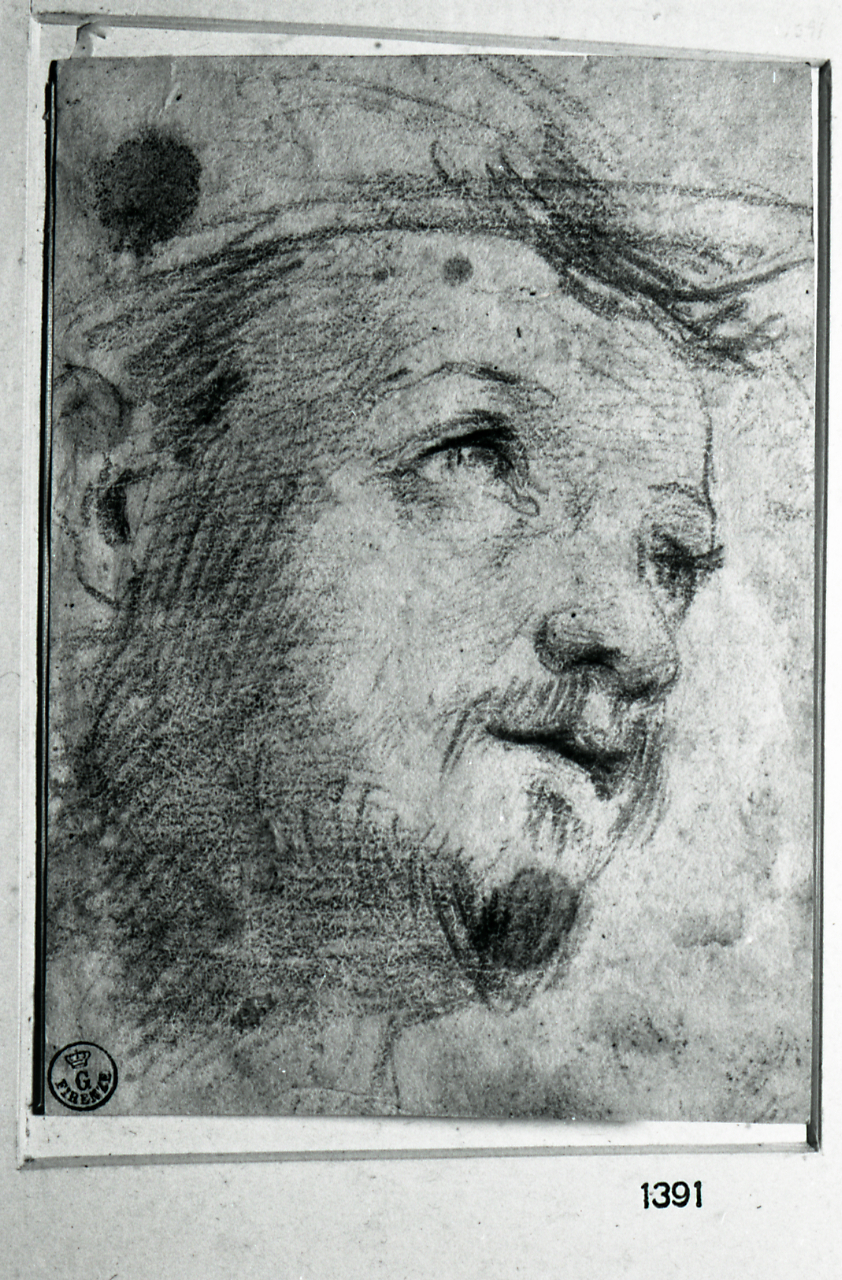

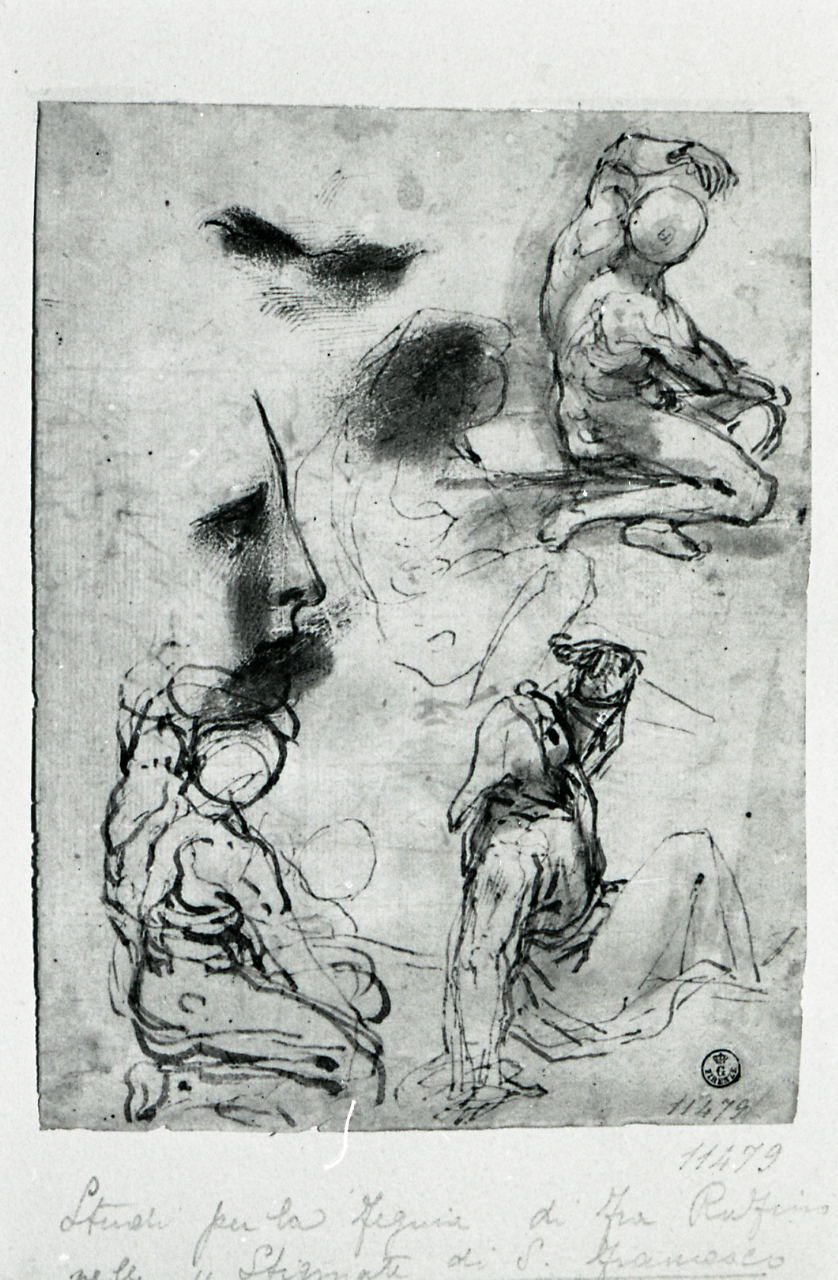

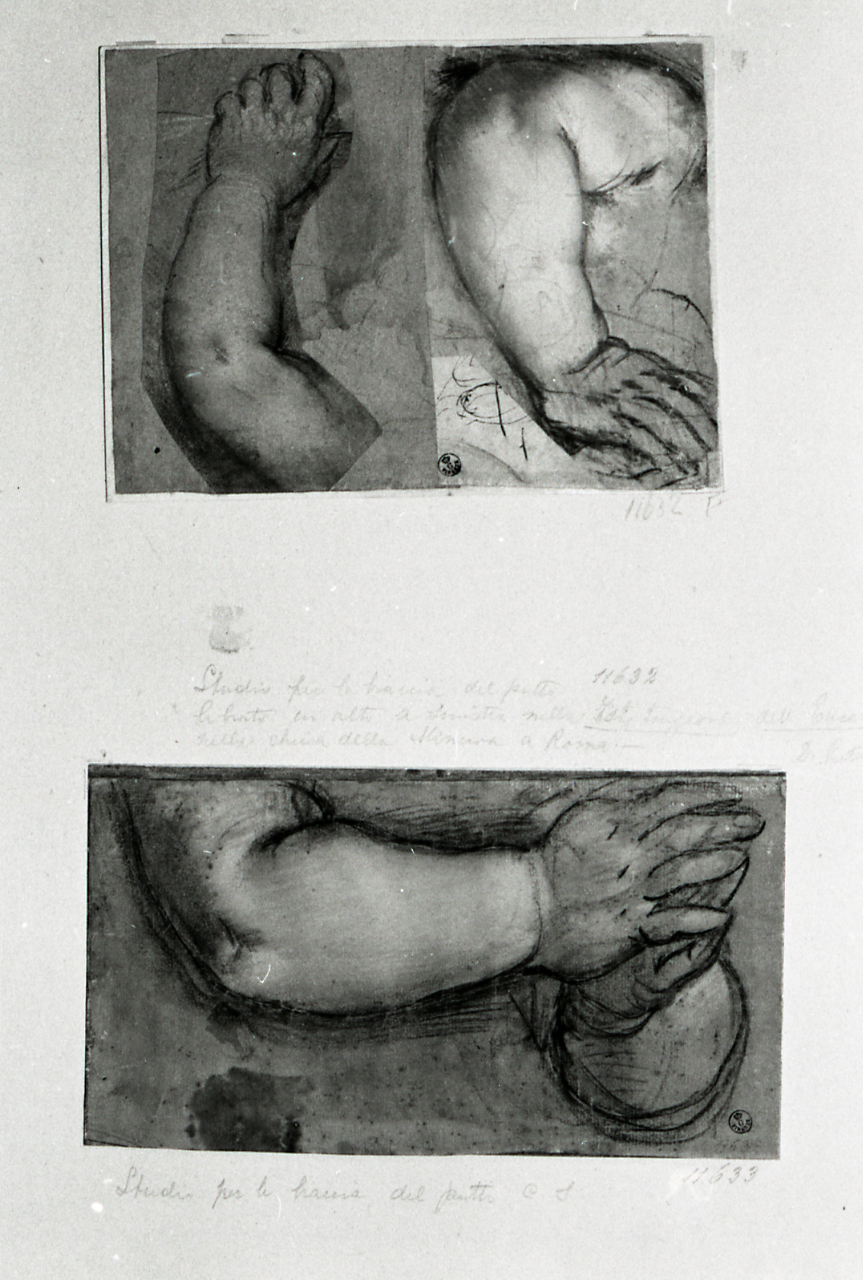

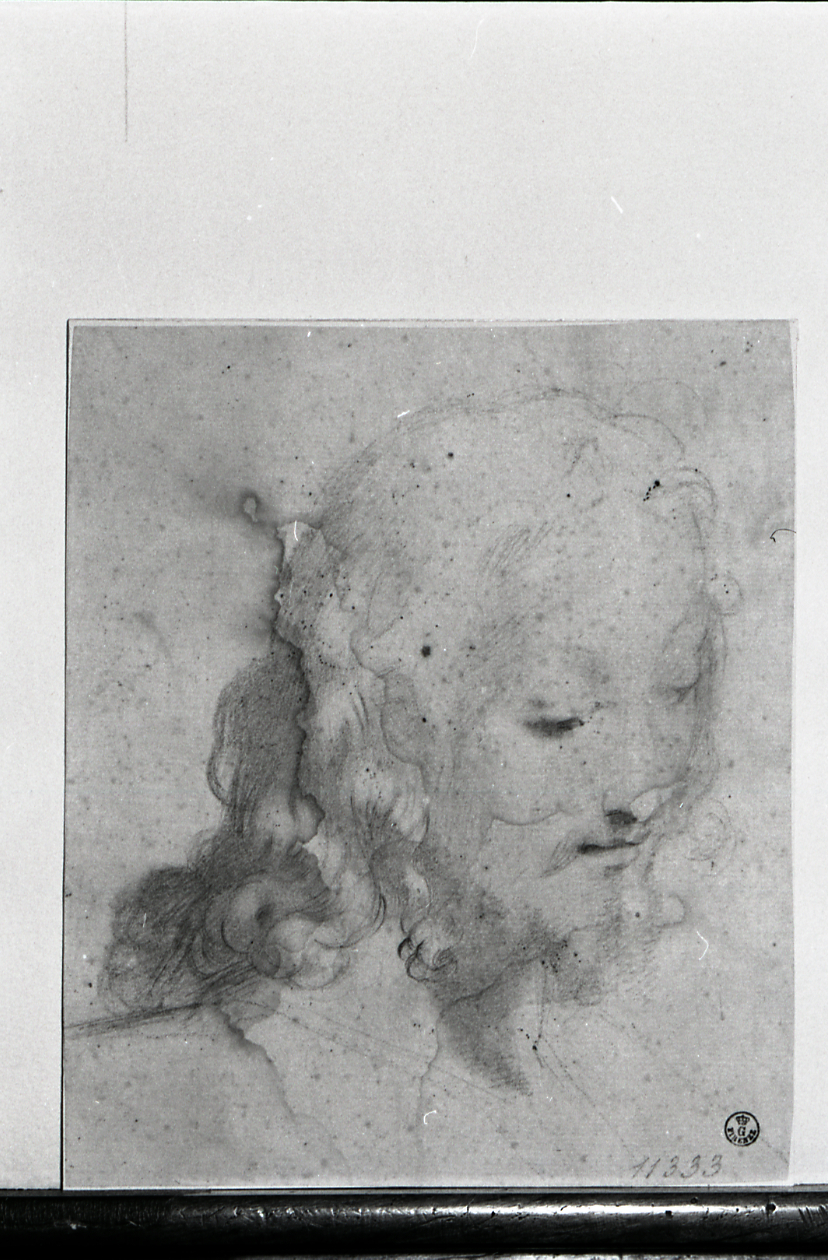

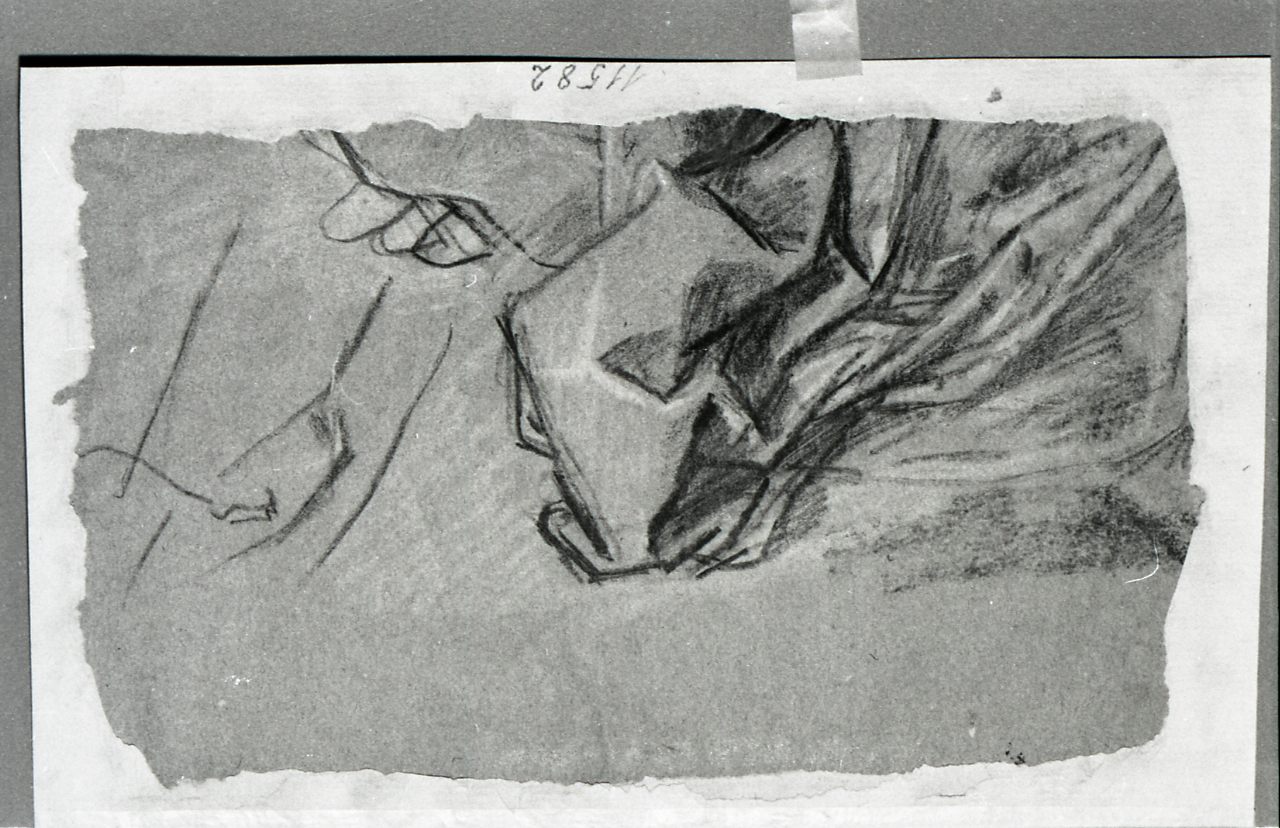

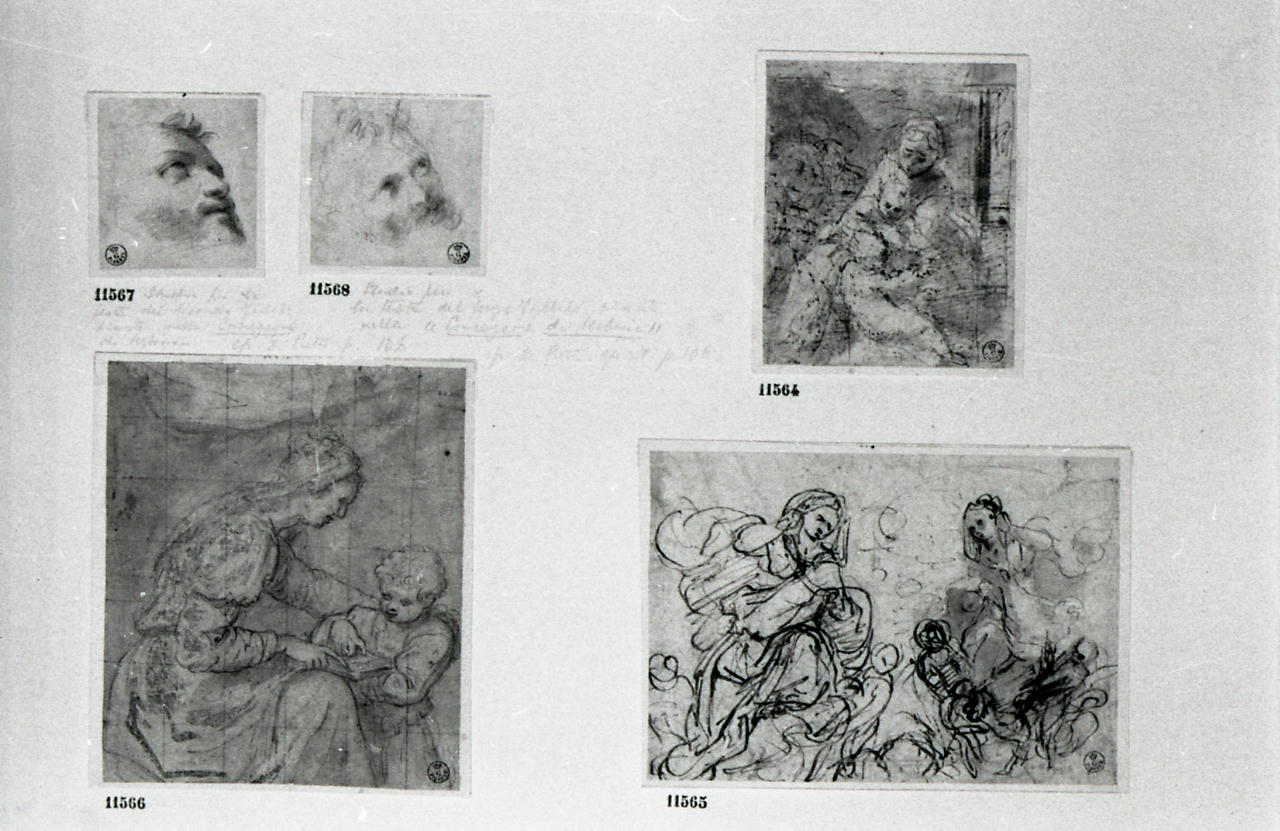

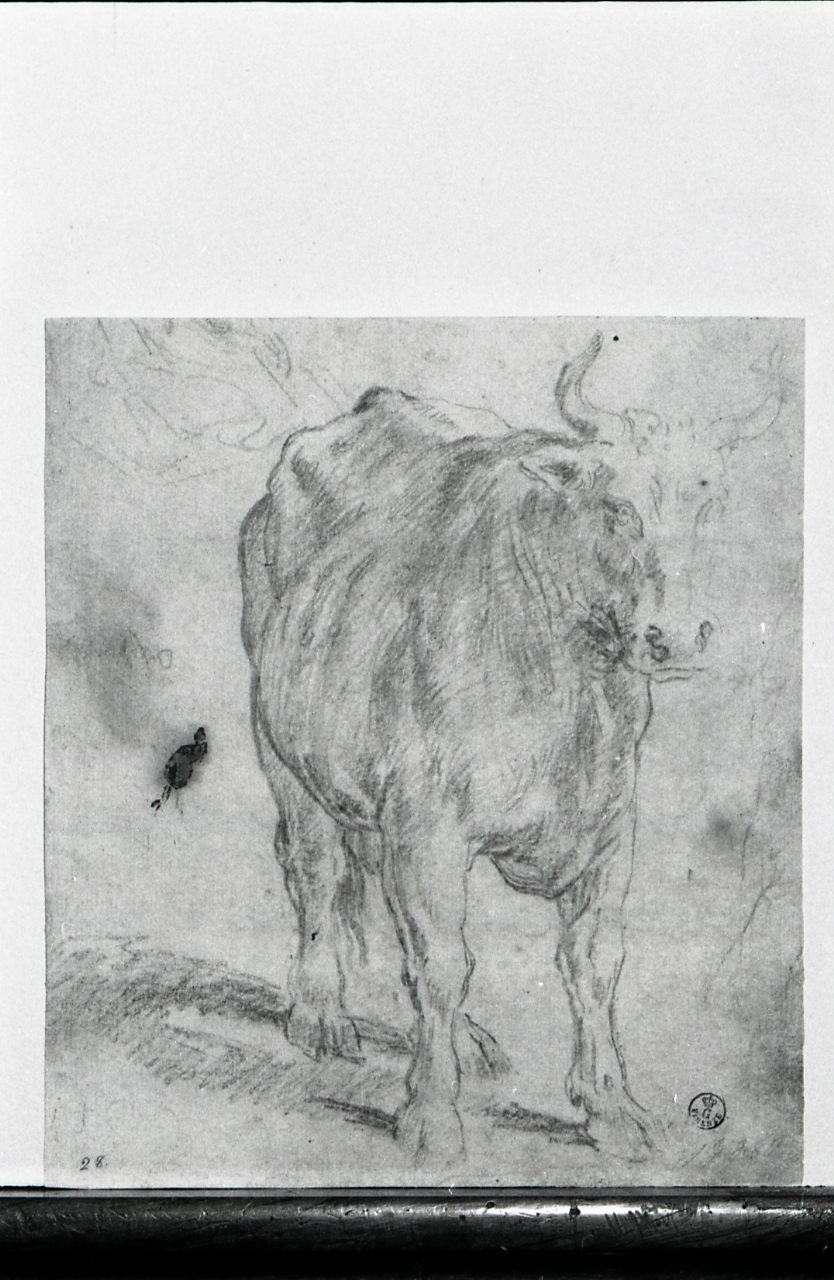

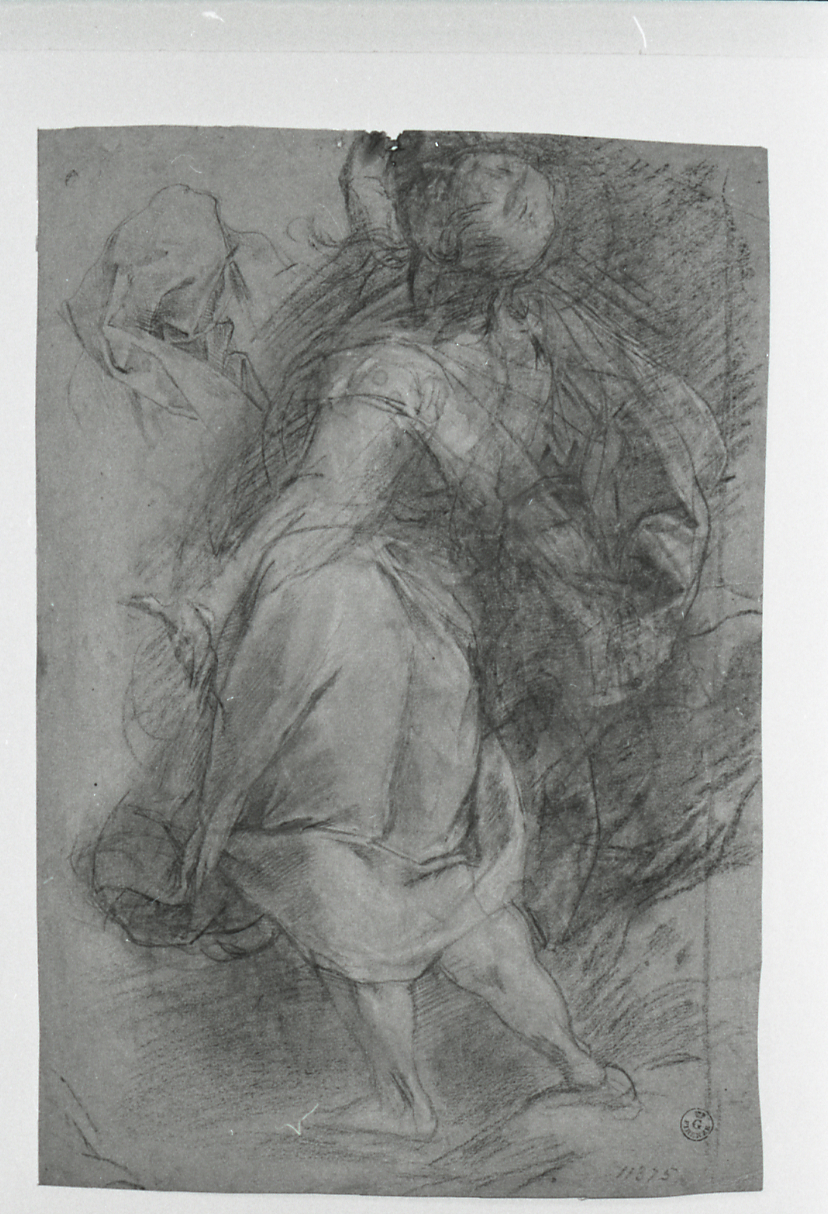

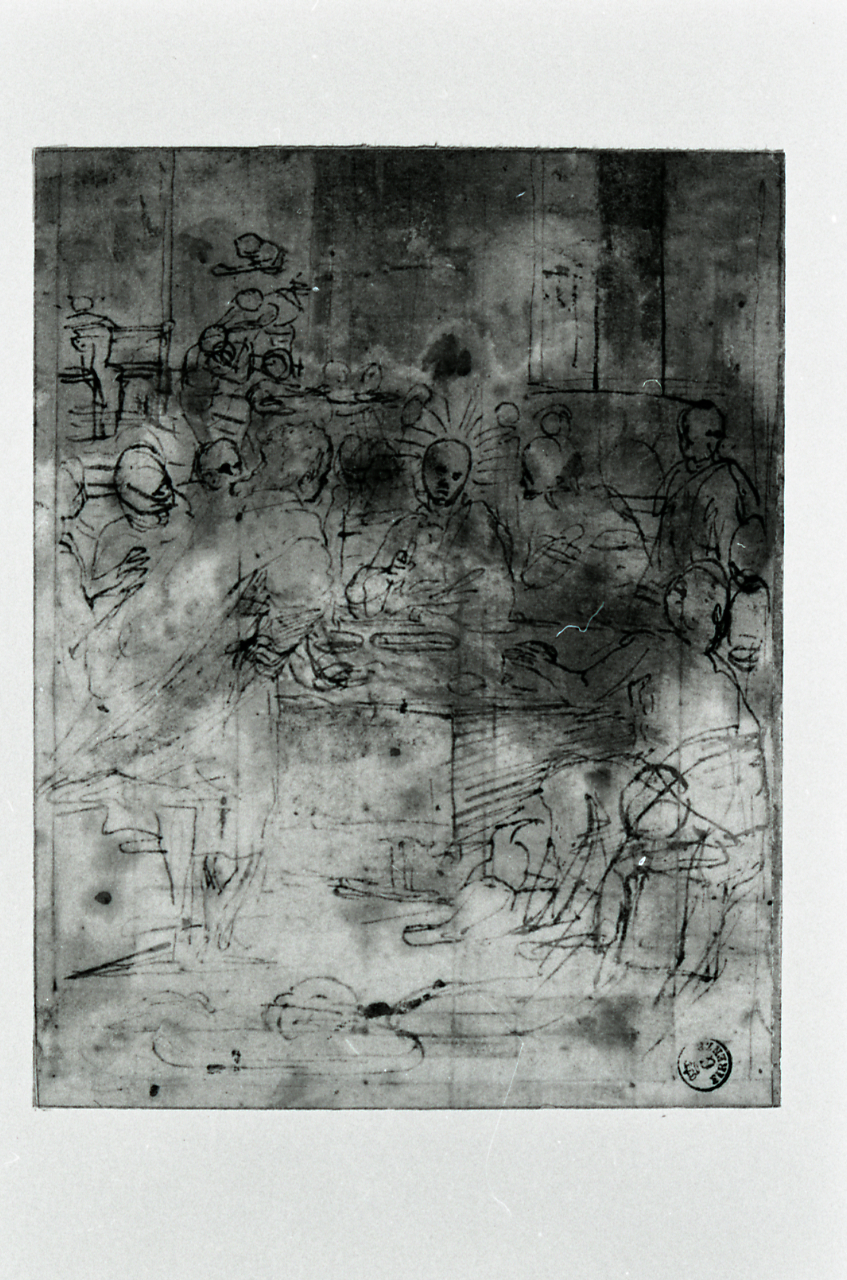

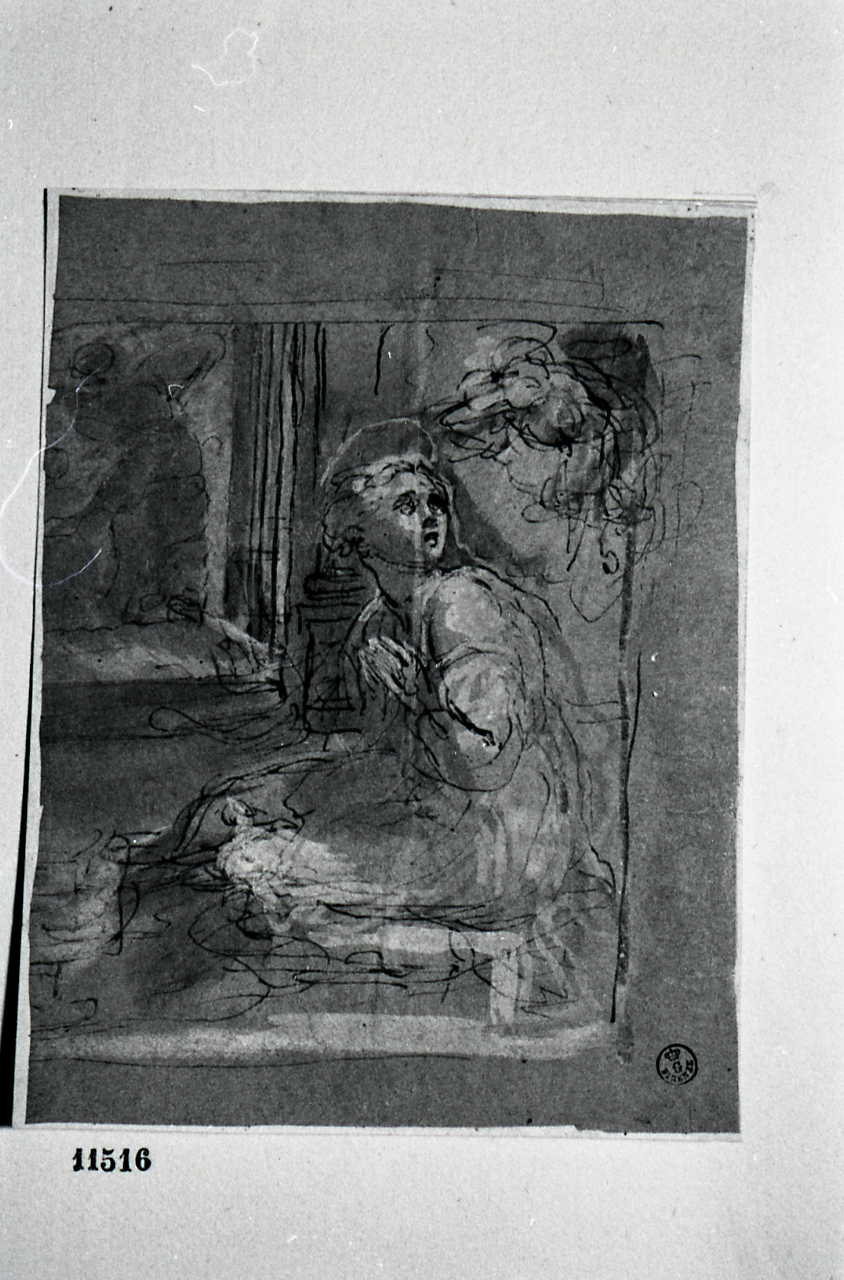

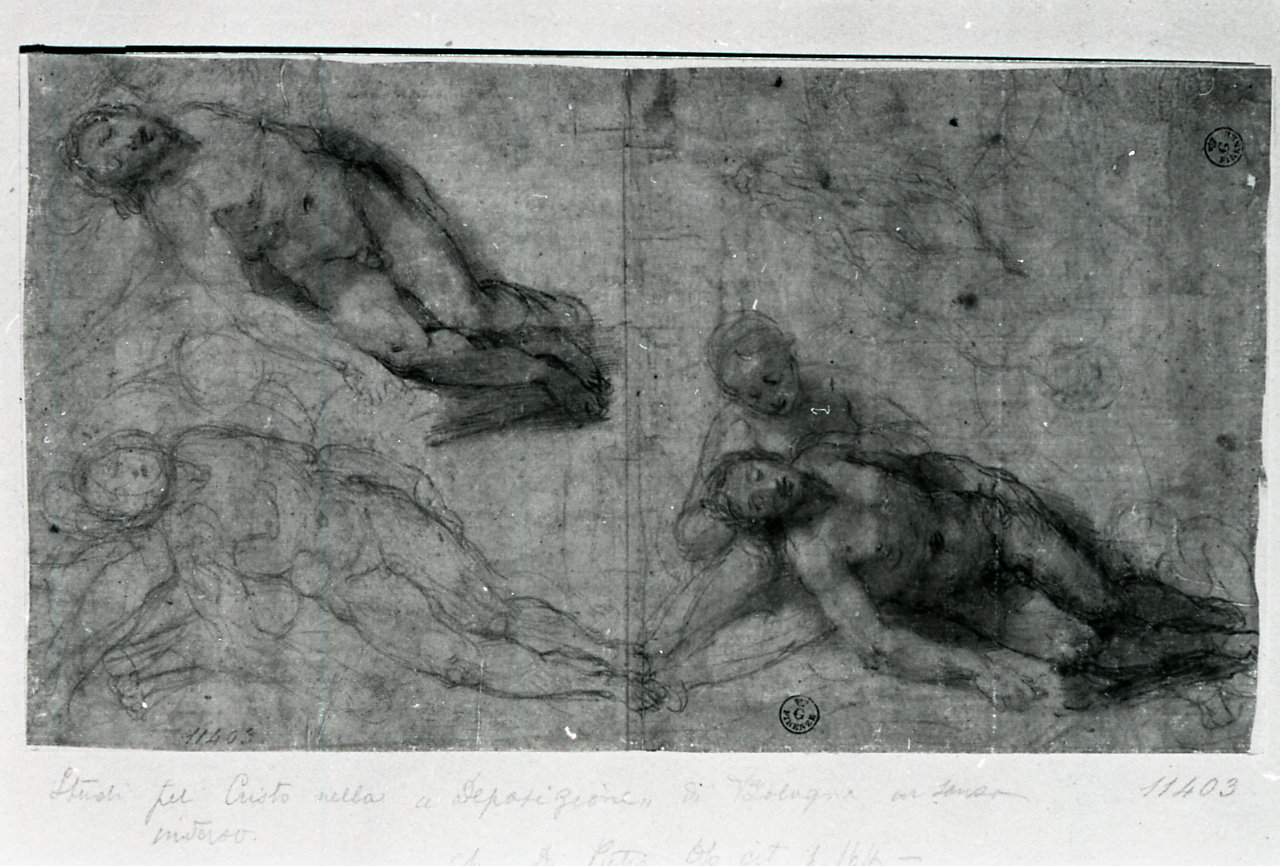

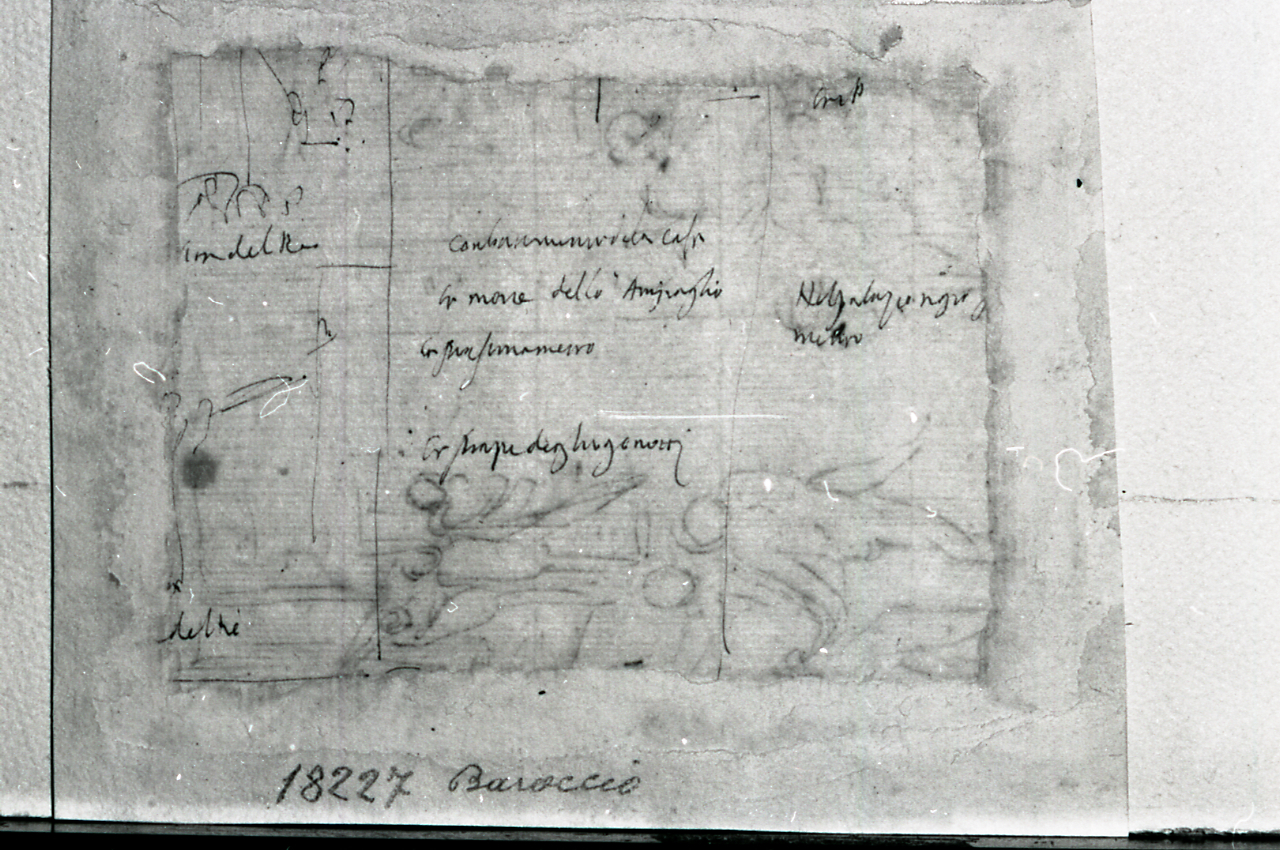

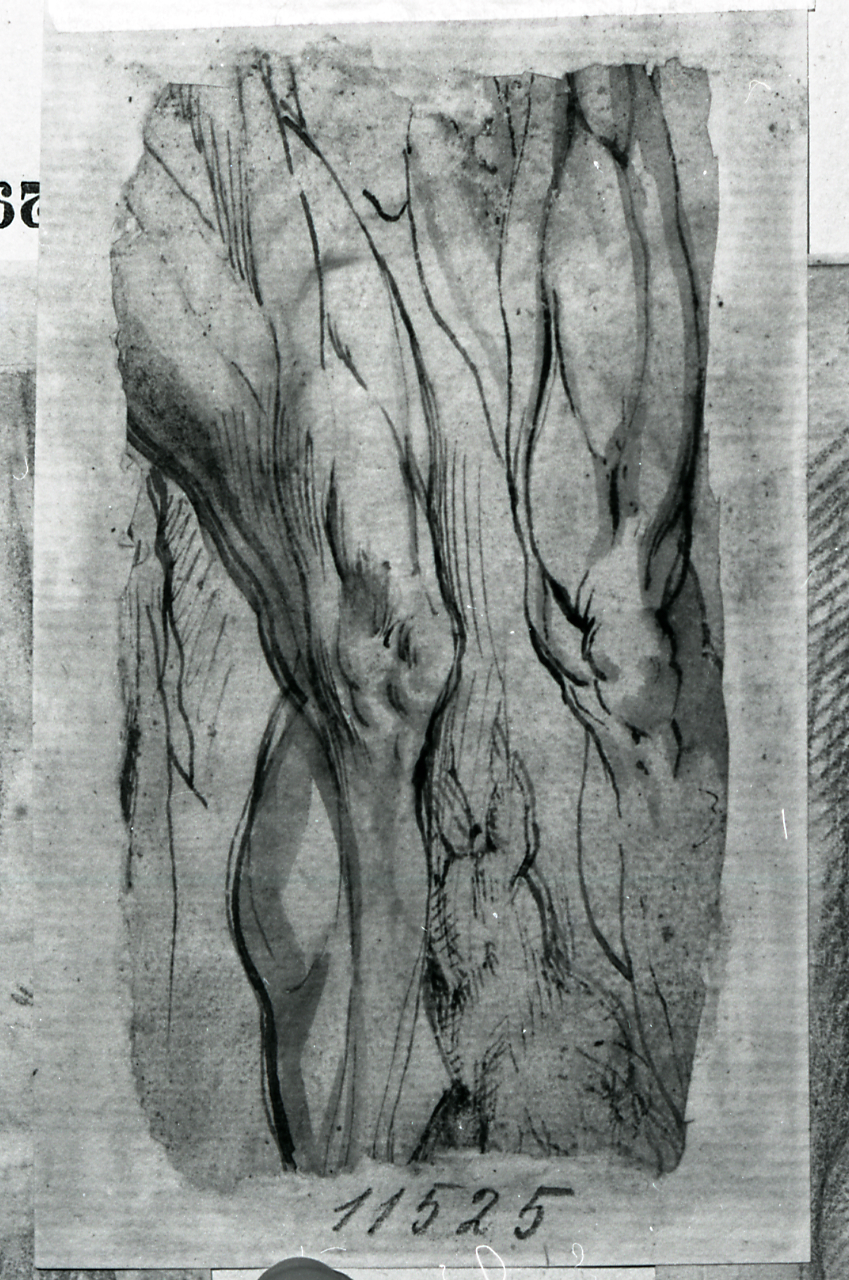

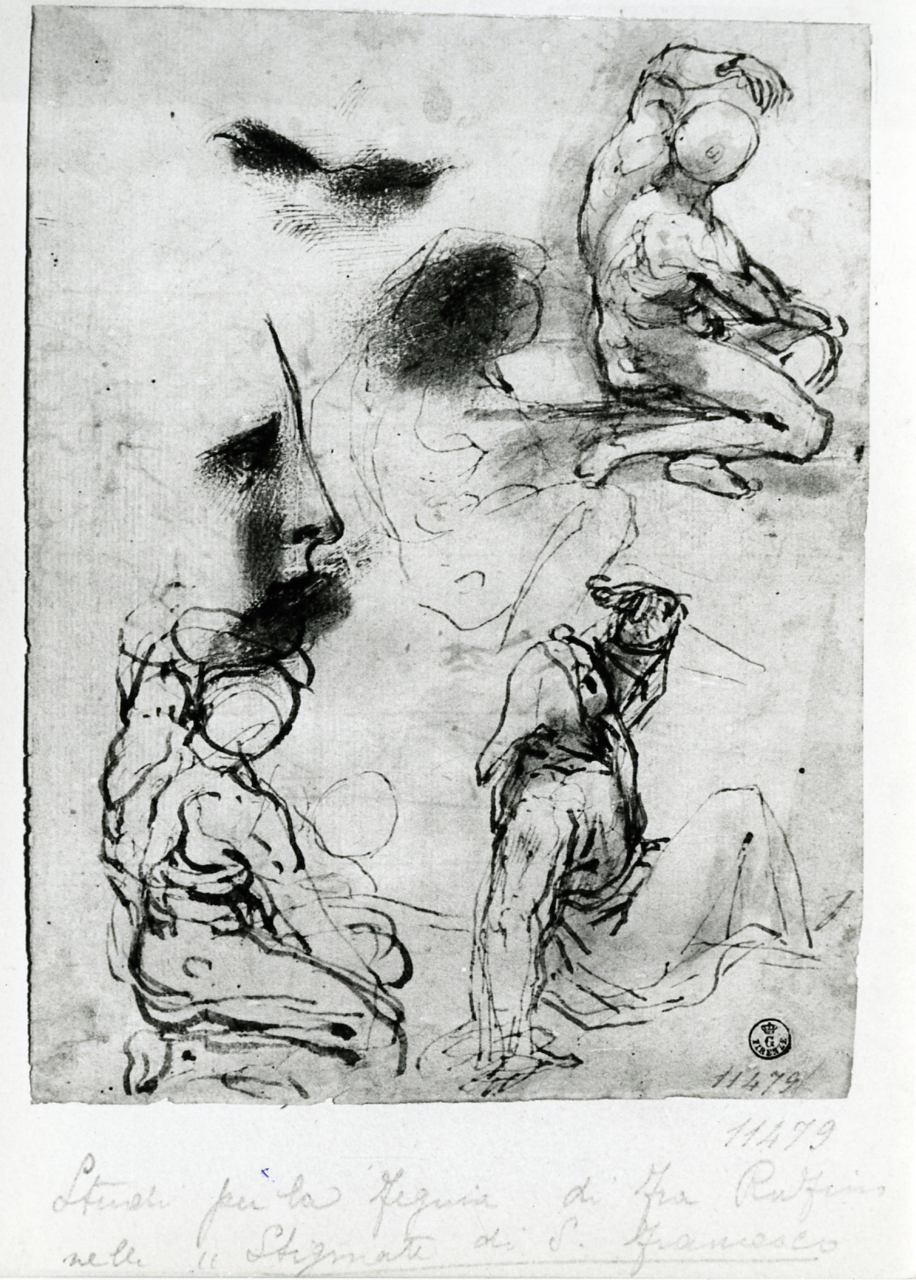

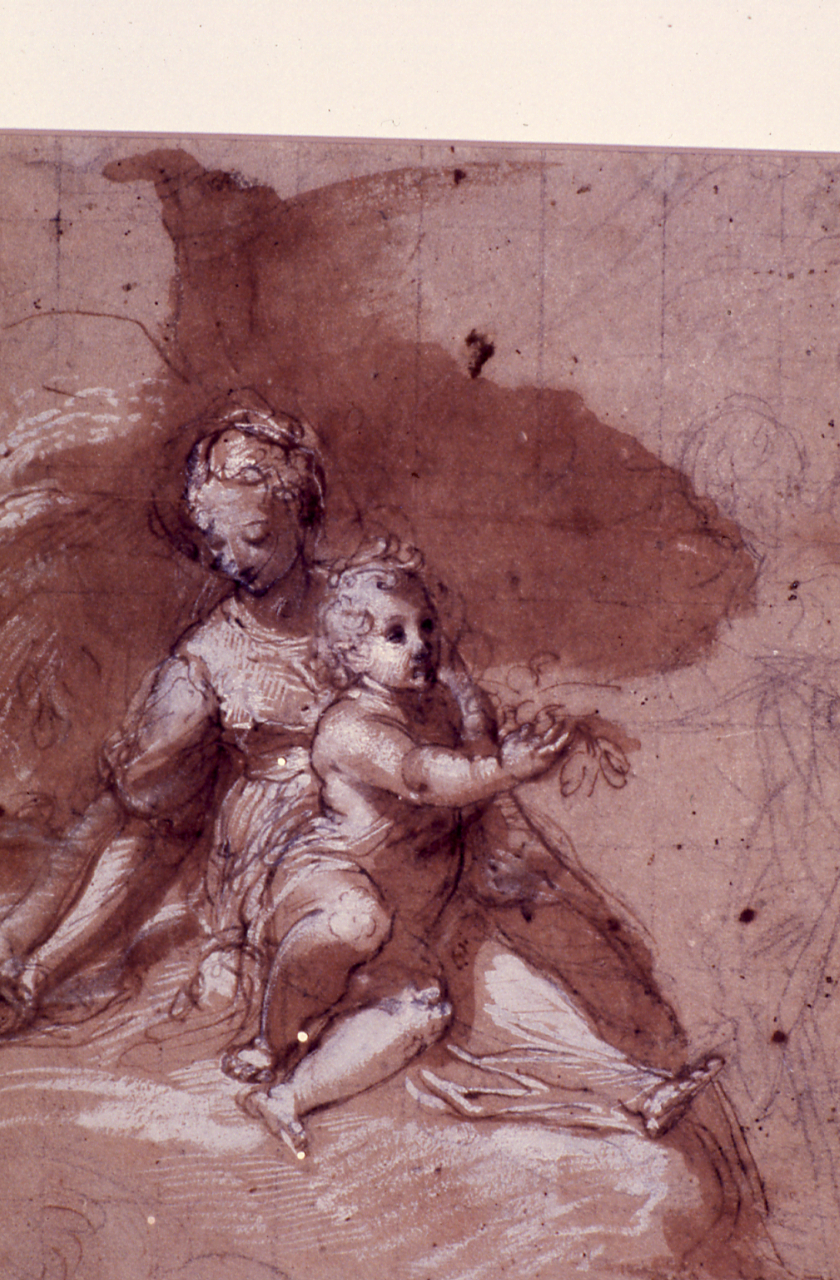

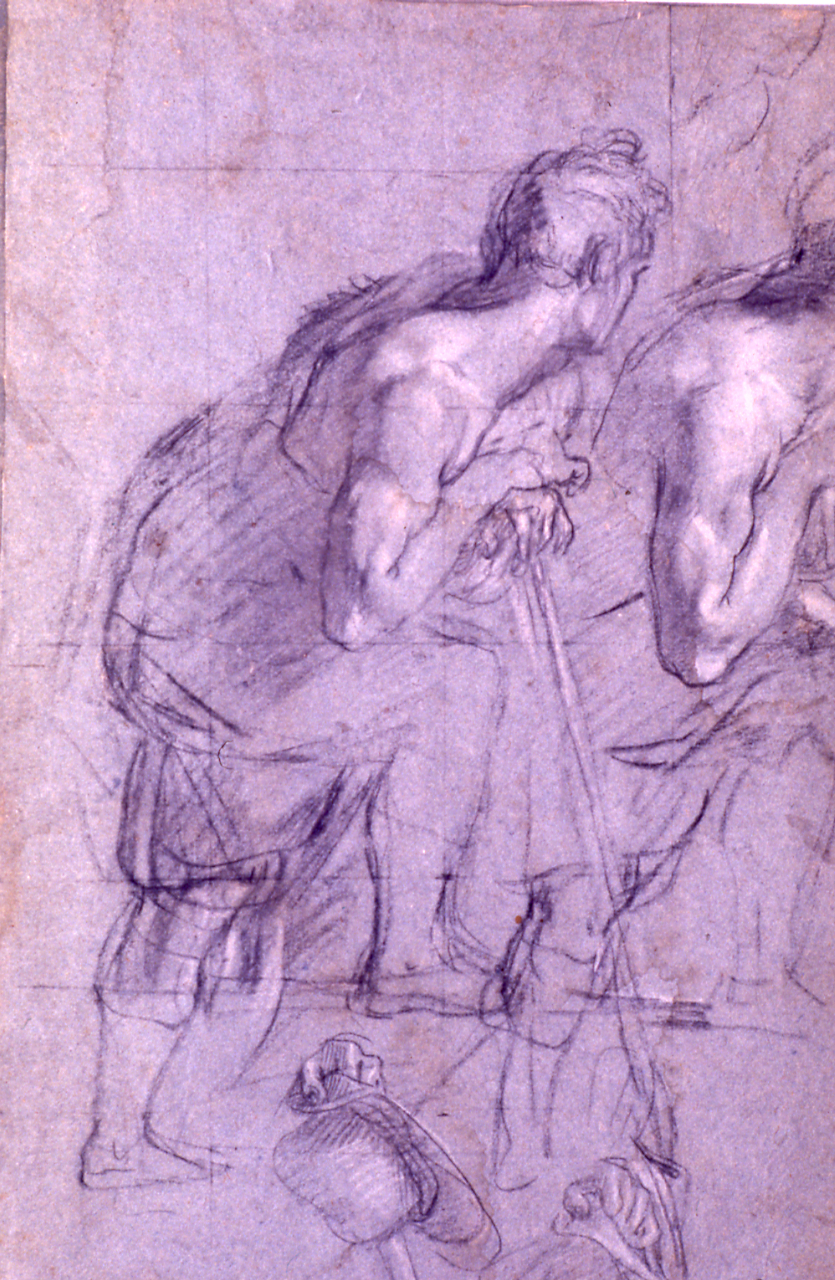

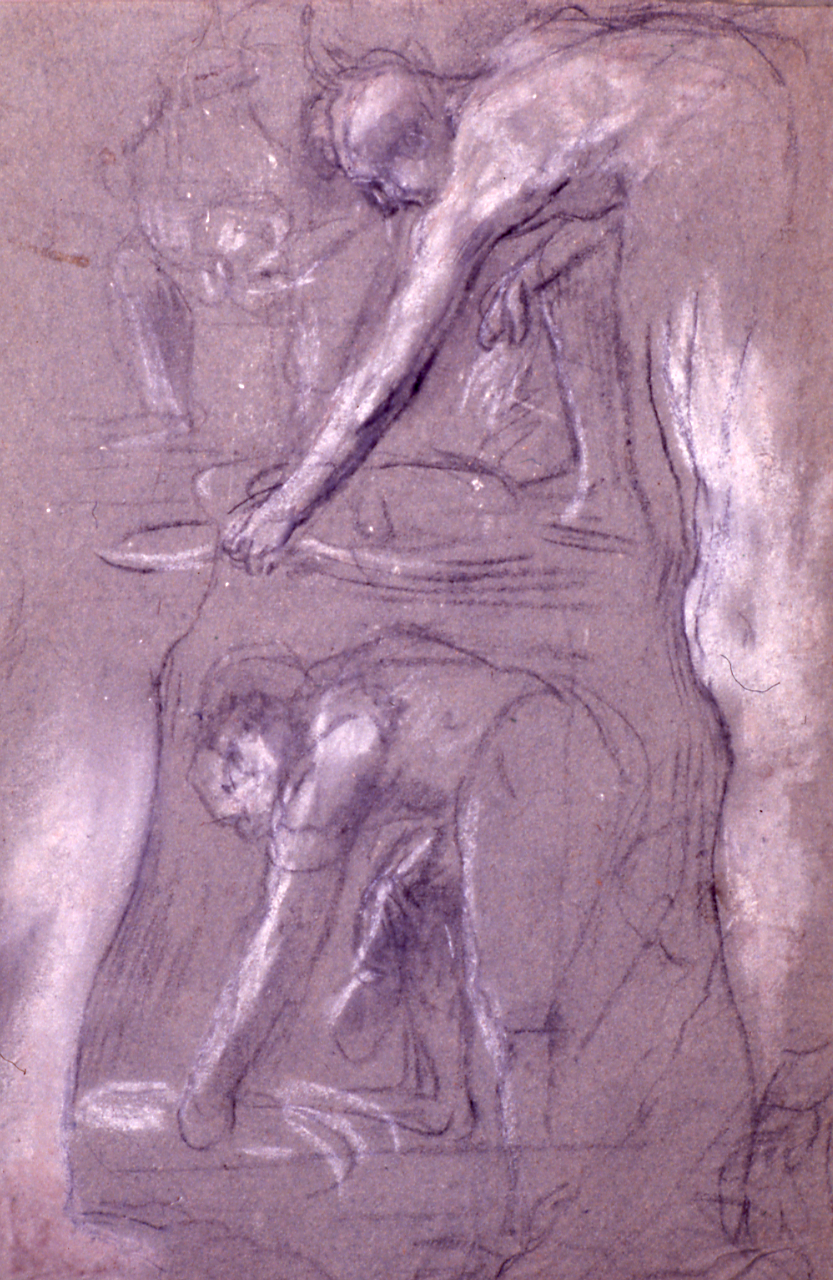

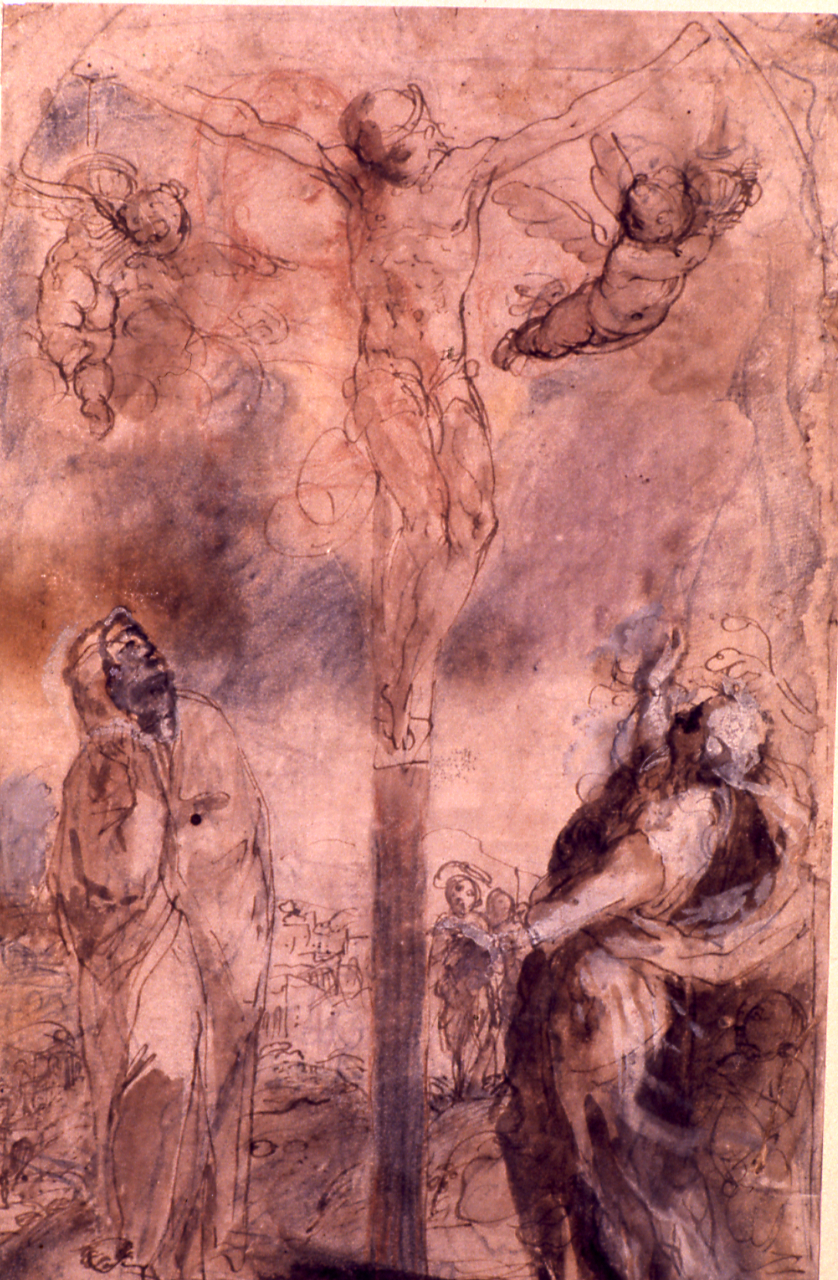

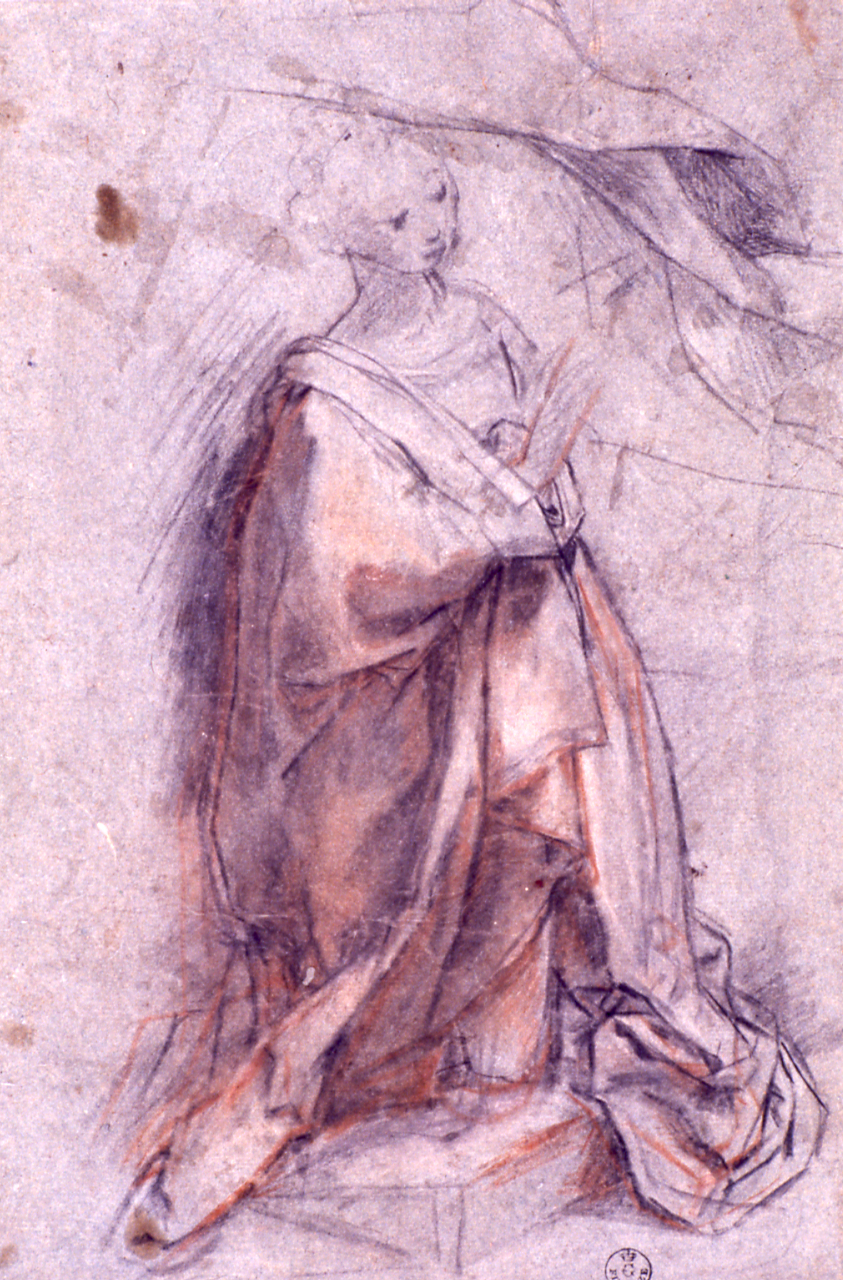

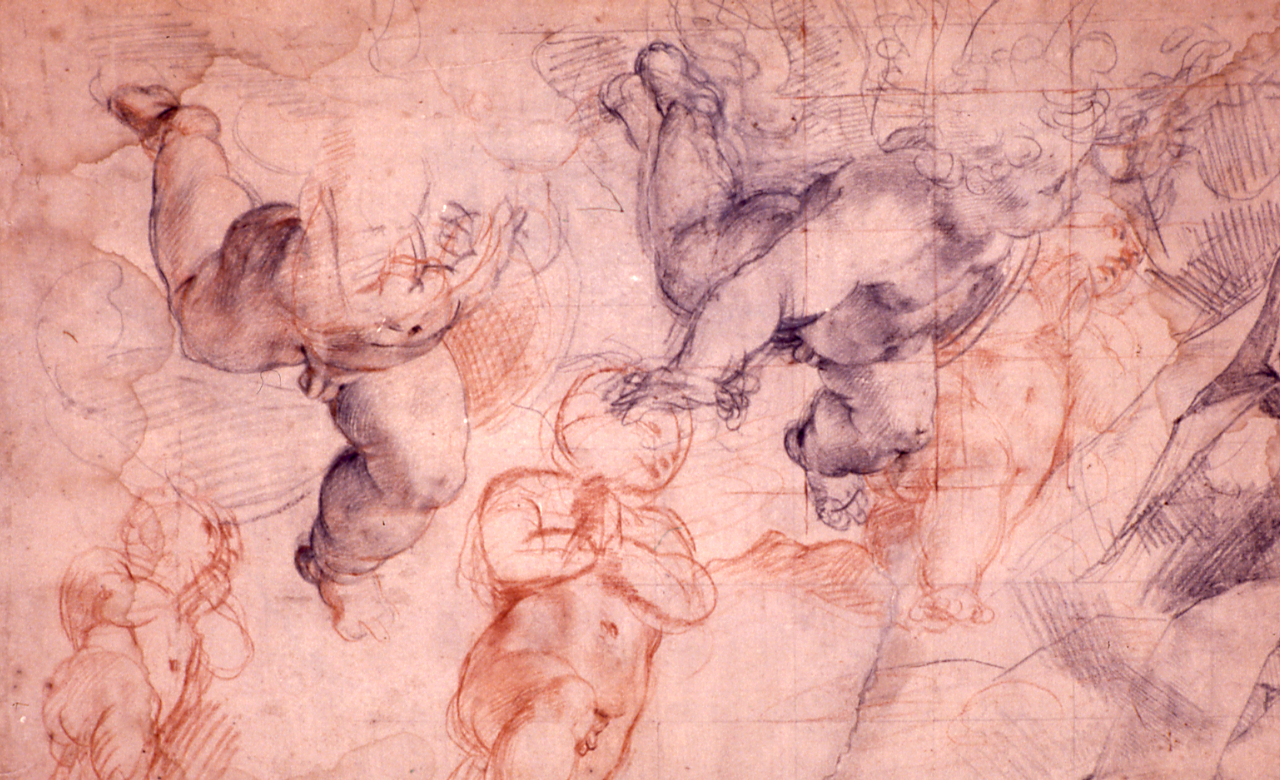

== Sources ==
- Scannelli, Francesco (1657). Il microscomo della pittura (in Italian). Peril Neri.
- Norwich, John Julius (1985–1993). Oxford illustrated encyclopedia. Judge, Harry George., Toyne, Anthony. Oxford [England]: Oxford University Press. p. 35. ISBN 0-19-869129-7. OCLC 11814265.
