= Communion of the Apostles (painting) =

Communion of the Apostles is the name of the following paintings:

- Communion of the Apostles (Barocci), a 1603–1608 painting by Federico Barocci
- Communion of the Apostles (Justus van Gent), a 1472–1474 tempera-on-panel painting by Justus van Gent
- Communion of the Apostles (Signorelli), a c. 1512 painting by Luca Signorelli
