= Nativity (Barocci) =

Painting by Federico Barocci

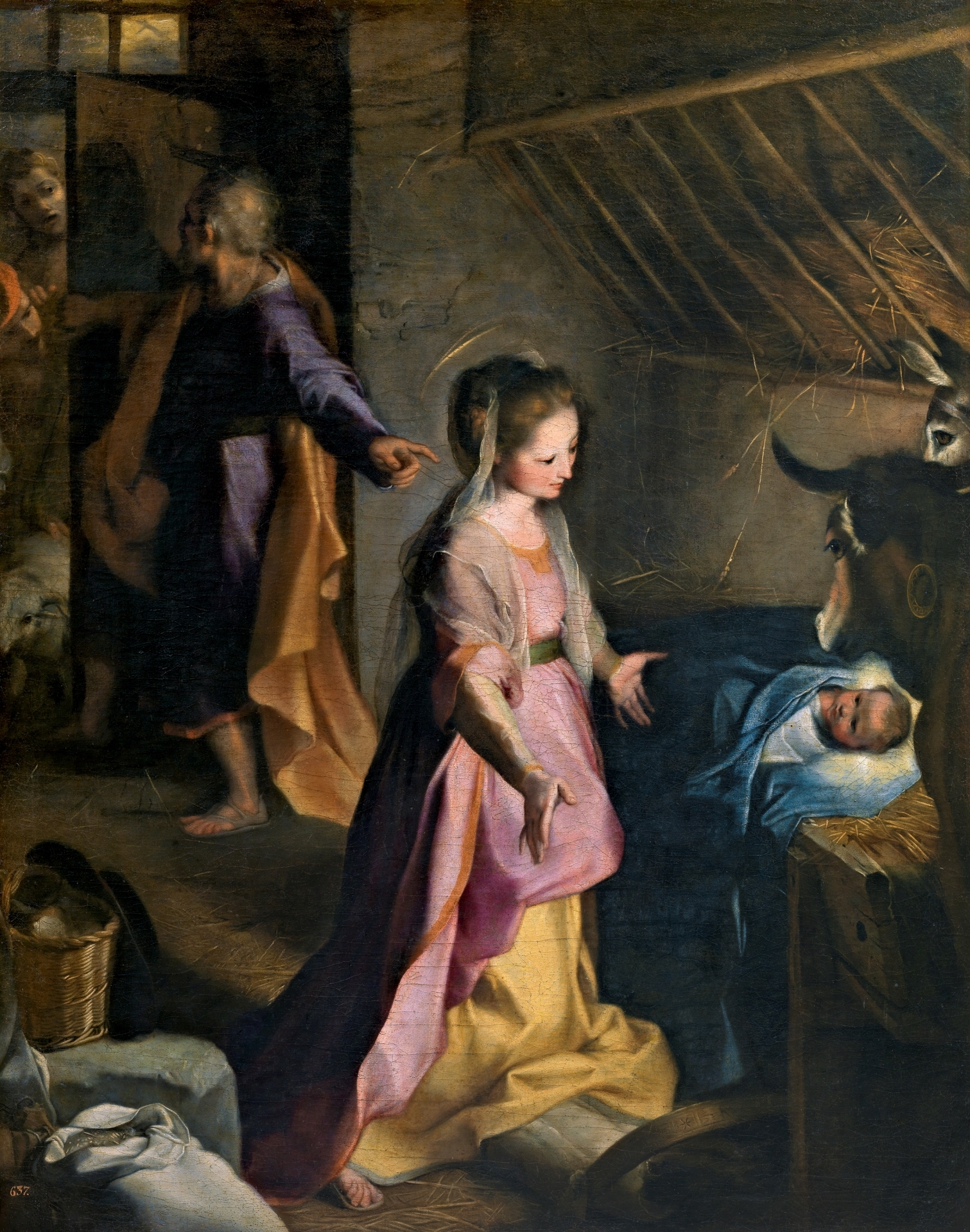
- Artist: Federico Barocci
- Year: 1597
- Medium: Oil on canvas
- Dimensions: 134 cm × 105 cm (53 in × 41 in)
- Location: Museo del Prado, Madrid

The Nativity is an oil on canvas painting by Italian painter Federico Barocci, created in 1597. It depicts the episode of the Nativity of Jesus. It is now in the Museo del Prado, in Madrid.

== History ==
The painting was commissioned and executed in 1597 for Francesco Maria II Della Rovere, Duke of Urbino. Some years later he was asked for the artist, probably with the purpose of a commission, by the ambassador Bernardo Maschi on behalf of the Spanish queen Margaret of Austria. Knowing about the artist's slowness but still wanting to please the queen, the duke decided to donate the work in his possession, which therefore went to Spain, in 1605. Queen Margaret appreciated the gift, defining the canvas as "very cheerful and devout". Barocci had made a copy in a slightly larger format, c. 1599, and presumably kept it in his study in the Archbishop's Palace. He said it was one of his most precious belongings. The original painting ended up in the Prado and the replica is now in the Pinacoteca Ambrosiana, in Milan.

== Description ==
In a stable with a donkey and an ox as company, depicted partially at the right, the newborn Jesus is seen lying on straw in a manger. There is a divine light which radiates from the Son of Man Himself. The light particularly illuminates his mother, the Virgin Mary, who welcomes it with gratitude and tenderly holds out her arms. Joseph is seen more in the background and in the shadows, while he turns his head towards two shepherds, who appear at the door; Joseph points them to the child. The signs of the zodiac are engraved on a metal ring below Jesus and Mary. These symbols seem to indicate the cosmological importance of the event witnessed.

The atmosphere of the scene is intimate and familiar. Barocci uses warm pastel tones and, like in other paintings, typically pays great attention to the depiction of the hands. Its diagonally structured composition is unusual for the subject.
