= Madonna del Popolo (Barocci) =

Painting by Federico Barocci

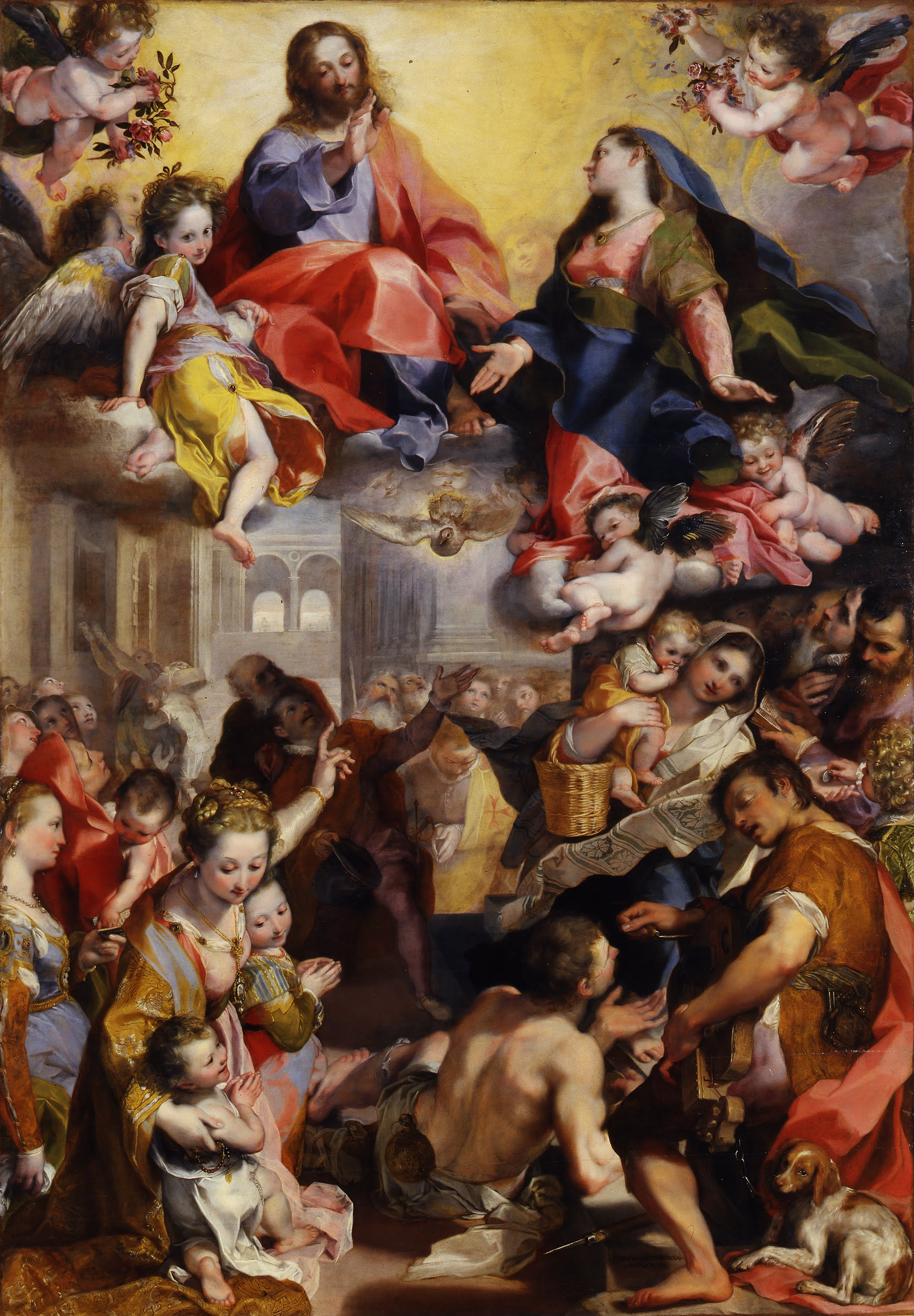
- Artist: Federico Barocci
- Year: 1575-1579
- Medium: Oil on wood
- Dimensions: 395 cm × 252 cm (156 in × 99 in)
- Location: Uffizi; Florence

The Madonna del Popolo is an oil on wood painting by Italian painter Federico Barocci, created in 1575-1579. It depicts the Madonna and the works of mercy. It is signed and dated FEDERICVS BAROTIVS VRBINAS MDLXXIX. It is held in the Uffizi, in Florence.

== History ==
The work had initially been commissioned by the Fraternita dei laici of Arezzo to Giorgio Vasari, as an altarpiece for the fraternity's chapel in Santa Maria della Pieve. In 1574, upon Vasari's death, the task was entrusted to Barocci, who worked on it until 1579 (the date affixed by the artist in the panel). The theme initially commissioned was the Mystery of Mercy, but the artist himself proposed a change.

After long studies, documented by the Barocci's numerous studies and preparatory sketches, preserved among others, in the British Museum, in London, in the Uffizi, and in the Kupferstichkabinett, in Berlin, the work was concluded and delivered in 1579, and went to be placed in the parish of Arezzo. It was accompanied by a cusp representing God the Father Blessing, now at the National Museum of Medieval and Modern Art, in Arezzo.

In the 17th century the work enjoyed great fame. It is said that painters such as Gregorio Pagani went particularly to Arezzo to admire and to study it. In 1786 the painting was purchased by Pietro Leopoldo, the Grand Duke of Tuscany, and moved to the Uffizi, in 1787, where it still hangs.

== Description ==
The painter went for a more modern depiction of the relation of the Virgin Mary with the works of mercy. It shows the people turning to Mary, who intercedes on their behalf to a blessing Jesus Christ, in the upper part of the panel.

Below, within a glimpse of the city, a differentiated multitude of people is represented. Some are recognizable as wealthy people, like the rich gentlewomen bejeweled and praying, others as from the lower classes, such as the woman with the child who receives alms from a young gentleman just on the edge of the stage. There is also a cripple with a water bottle, lying on the ground, who asks for alms, and a blind hurdy-gurdy player. The children are very expressive and caught in realistic moments, like the one who disturbs a woman by carelessly leafing through the prayer book she holds in her hand, or the one kneeling next to his mother who smiles distracted by the sound of the hurdy-gurdy. Details such as the little dog in the foreground, on the right, or the little angel near Jesus, in his innocent shyness, are of lively immediacy.

The appearance of Jesus, Mary and the dove, a symbol of the Holy Spirit, all surrounded by little angels, is not abstract and unreal. Their clouds project a shadow at the center of the painting from where the crowd distances itself to see the supernatural presence.

The composition of the Madonna del Popolo is more free than some works by the artist from previous years, such as the Deposition in the Cathedral of Perugia. The space of the canvas is filled with figures, arranged in a circle, which gives depth to the lower scene. The colors are bright, they are made rare and precious by delicate iridescent effects.
