= San Giovanni Battista, Rimini =

Roman Catholic church in Rimini, Italy

Coordinates: 44.055012°N 12.572242°E

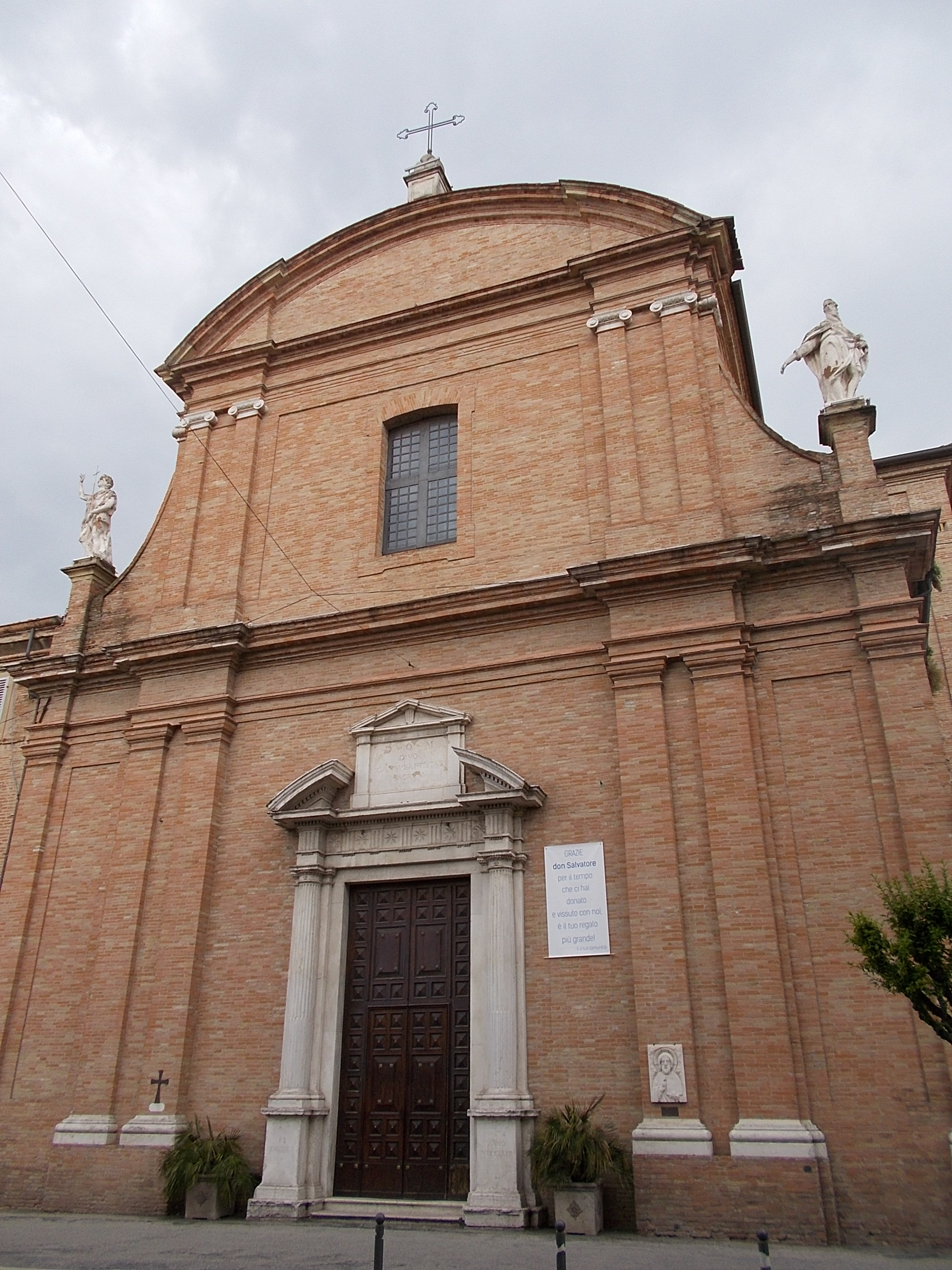

San Giovanni Battista is a Baroque-style Roman Catholic church located on Via XX settembre #1870 in Rimini, region of Emilia-Romagna, Italy.

== History ==
The church was located adjacent to the site of a paleo-Christian basilica, dedicated to San Stefano, and erected sometime in the 5th century under the patronage of Galla Placidia. The basilica was razed during the troubles of the 8th century. In its place, it is documented that by 1144 arose this church dedicated to John the Baptist. In 1573, it was assigned to the Discalced Carmelite Order, and in 1605, it joined the parish of San Gregorio. In 1767 to 1772, the Carmelites commissioned Gaetano Cupioli to rebuild the church in a late baroque style. In 1797, the church and convent as suppressed, and granted to the Capuchin friars till 1805, when it became again a parish.

== Interiors ==
In 1864, an inventory of the artworks included:

- Second chapel on right, stuccoes of an altarpiece dedicated to the Virgin of the Carmine by Antonio Trentanove, flanked by canvases depicting the Adoration of the Magi and a Crucifixion by Antonio de Cimatori
- First Chapel on left, St Theresa, St Maria Maddalena de' Pazzi below the Virgin, Angels, and St Andrew Corsini by Guido Cagnacci
- Second chapel on left, Holy Trinity and Virgin with Patrons of the City by the friar Cosimo Piazza, pupil of Palma il Giovane
- Third chapel on left, Martyrdom of St Gaudenzio (1794) by Soleri
- Main altarpiece, Sermon of John the Baptist (1559) by Andrea Boscoli

The apse now has a wooden crucifix of the 14th or 15th centuries, restored in the 1960s. The Crucifix is in a framed wood and stucco altarpiece by Trentanove.
