= Ventura Mazza =

Italian painter

Ventura Mazza or Mazzi or Marzi or Mazi or Magi (circa 1560 - 6 March 1638) was an Italian painter of the late Renaissance.

== Biography ==
He was born in Cantiano, then part of the Duchy of Urbino. He was a pupil of Federico Barocci. In the studio, he both copied designs and worked as an agent for Barocci's large studio, assuring compliance with patrons' wishes, delivering, or completing commissions sent outside of Umbria.

In 1604, Mazza restored the stucco model of the statue of Federico da Montefeltro by Girolamo Campagna (made using designs of Barocci) for the Ducal Palace of Urbino. He painted a St Homobonus (1620) for the sacristy of the Duomo of Urbino, now in the National Gallery of Urbino. Future critics such as Luigi Lanzi and Stefano Ticozzi. The latter noted that in this work, while Mazza, unlike other Barocci pupils, freed himself from the style of his masters, he did so for a "poorer style". Many of his commissions were based on designs of Barocci, including an Annunciation for the Cathedral of Cagli, or paintings by Francesco Maria II della Rovere, Duke of Urbino for the church in Loreto, of copies of the Madonna della Gatta. For the Duke above, he made copies of a Titian work. He also painted an altarpiece of the Madonna della Cintura with Sts Dominci and Crescentiano, now found in Pinacoteca di San Domenico, Fondazione Cassa di Risparmio di Fano.

He lived in poverty by 1636 and died in Urbino in 1638.
