= Antonio Cimatori =

Italian painter (1550–1623)

Antonio Cimatori, called Il Visacci (c. 1550–1623) was an Italian painter.

== Life ==
Cimatori was a native of Urbino, who excelled in chiaroscuro and in pen and ink drawing, painting mainly religious scenes. He was a scholar of Federico Barocci. Among his pupils was Giulio Cesare Begni.

His paintings of the Annunciation and of St Francesca da Rimini are in the church of S. Biagio in Roncofreddo. He painted an Adoration of the Magi and a Crucifixion for the church of San Giovanni Battista, Rimini.

== Works ==
- St. Matthew and the Angel
- Works at the Louvre (in the graphic arts department), Paris:
  - Annunciation
  - Martyrdom of St Sebastian
