= Portrait of a Young Man (Barocci) =

Painting by Federico Barocci

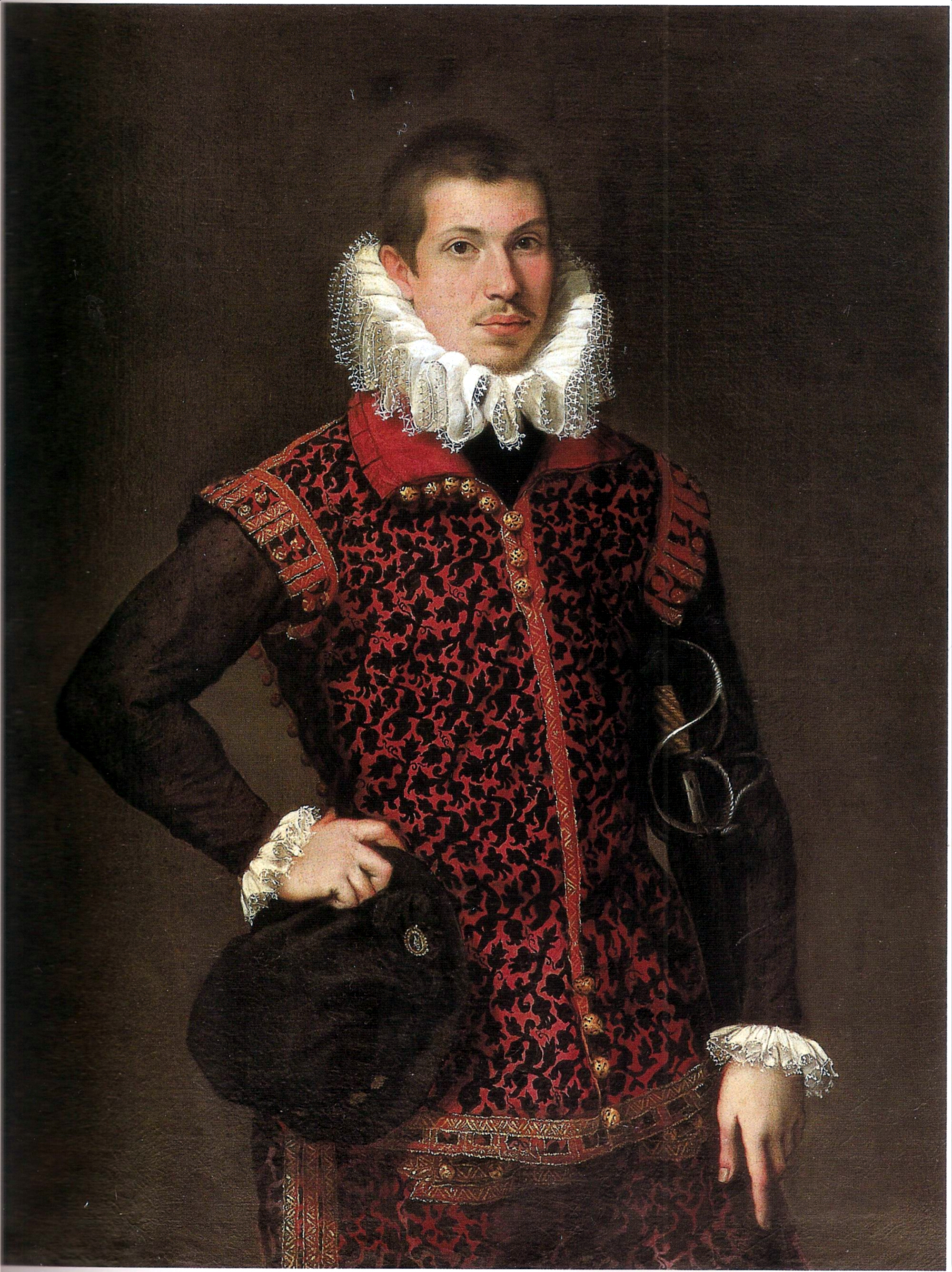
- Artist: Federico Barocci
- Year: c. 1580–1585
- Medium: oil painting on canvas
- Movement: Italian Renaissance painting
- Subject: An anonymous young aristocrat
- Dimensions: 112 cm × 93 cm (44 in × 37 in)
- Location: Musée des Beaux-Arts, Strasbourg
- Accession: 1942

Portrait of a Young Man is an oil painting on canvas by the Italian painter Federico Barocci, from c. 1580–1585. It is held at the Musée des Beaux-Arts, in Strasbourg.

== History and description ==
It is a three-quarter length portrait painting of an unidentified young nobleman, possibly from the House of Della Rovere and the court of Pesaro, Italy. It is one of the relatively few portrait paintings by Barocci, who was a precursor of Baroque painting. The work is now in the Musée des Beaux-Arts de Strasbourg. Its inventory number is 1658.

The painting was bought in 1942 from Hans Wendland by the Generalverwaltung der oberrheinischen Museen (General administration of the Upper Rhine museums), in Paris. It was then thought to be a work by Giovanni Battista Moroni. Later it was attributed to Alonso Sánchez Coello, because of the "Spanish" aspect of the young man's costume, but since the case made by Michel Laclotte, in 1965, it is now recognized as a work by Federico Barocci. Portrait of a Young Man is considered as one of the most outstanding portraits in the Strasbourg collection.
