= Rest on the Flight into Egypt (Barocci) =

Painting by Federico Barocci

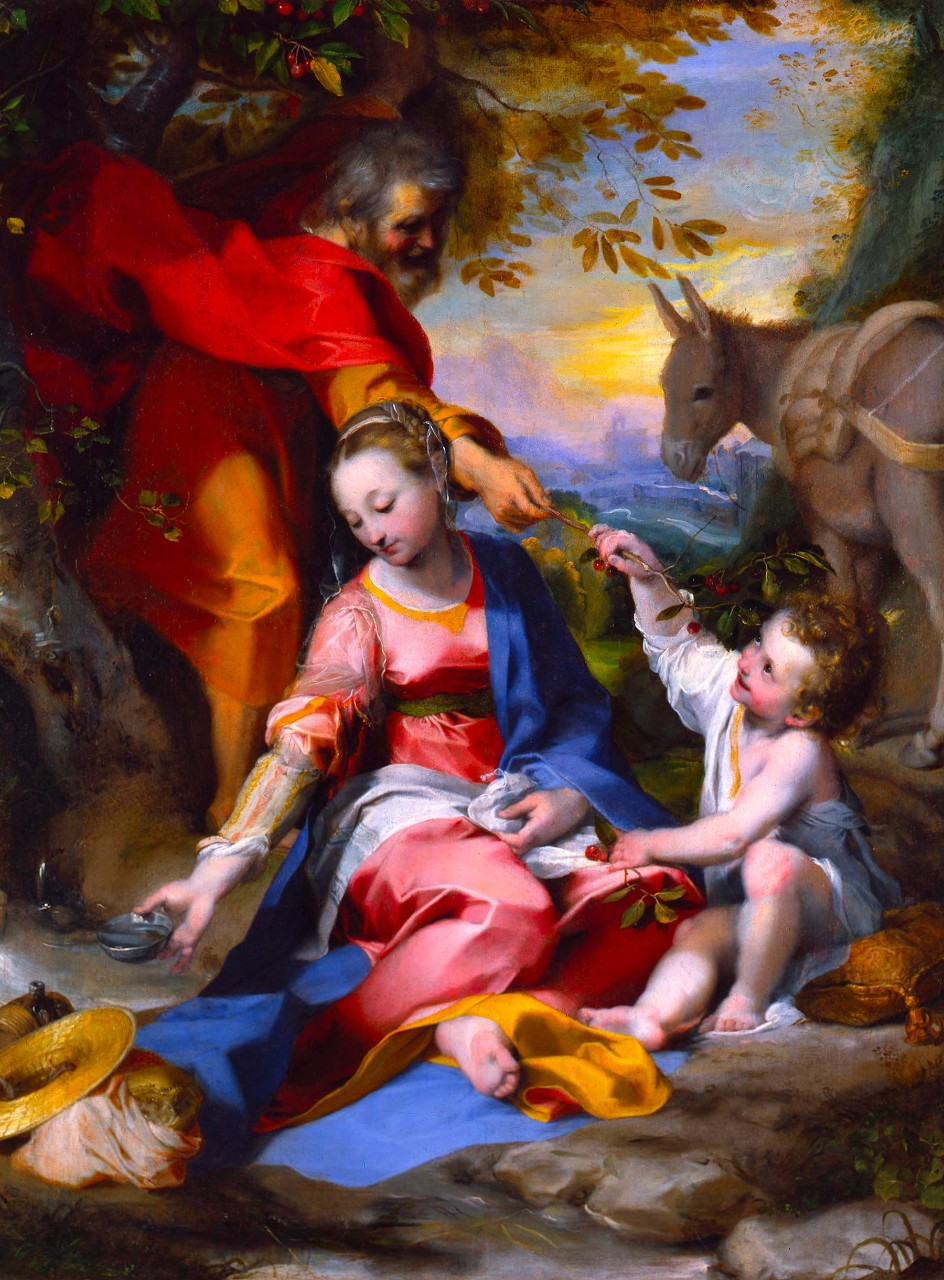
- Artist: Federico Barocci
- Year: c. 1573
- Medium: Oil on canvas
- Dimensions: 133 cm × 110 cm (52 in × 43 in)
- Location: Vatican Museums, Vatican

Rest on the Flight into Egypt is an oil on canvas painting by Italian painter Federico Barocci, created c. 1573. It is held in the Pinacoteca Vaticana.

== Description ==
The painting depicts an episode from the early life of Jesus, the Rest on the Flight into Egypt, a usual subject in Catholic art. The scene is shown from a simple and familiar point of view so as to invite devotion among the faithful. In the center, the Virgin Mary, who is seated, draws water. Behind her, Joseph holds out a branch with a few cherries from a tree to Jesus. The straw hat, the flask, the food bag and the donkey, at the right, contribute to create an atmosphere of intimacy and peace. The presence of cherries, however, are a symbol prefiguring the Passion of Christ. The scene opens to a landscape, in the background.

All these elements, when paintings of this kind served the faithful's need for concentration and prayer, lend the composition a dimension of intimacy and a special tenderness. In Barocci's painting, color emanates from objects like a fragrance, diffusing and evaporating. His style follows the trend of the second half of the 16th century, which expresses religious sentiment without the complex forms of Mannerism. On the contrary, he prefers delicate images, pinkish colors, soft light, and landscapes as a background. The precision with which he represents many details (the fruits, the metal objects, the objects in the lower left corner) foreshadows future developments that will give rise to the new genre (for Italy) of "still lifes".
