= Nicola Trometta =

Italian painter

Niccola Trometta (17th century; also called da Pesaro) was an Italian painter of the Baroque. He was a pupil of the Mannerist painter Federico Zuccari in Rome, but became influenced by Federico Barocci. Trometta painted for the Ara Coeli and Last Supper for the Church of the Sacrament in Pesaro. He died during the papacy of Paul V (1605–1621).
