= Vincenzo Pellegrini =

Italian painter

Vincenzo Pellegrini (1575–1612) was an Italian painter of the late-Renaissance and Baroque periods, born at Perugia. He was a follower of Federico Barocci
