= Benedetto Bandiera =

Italian painter

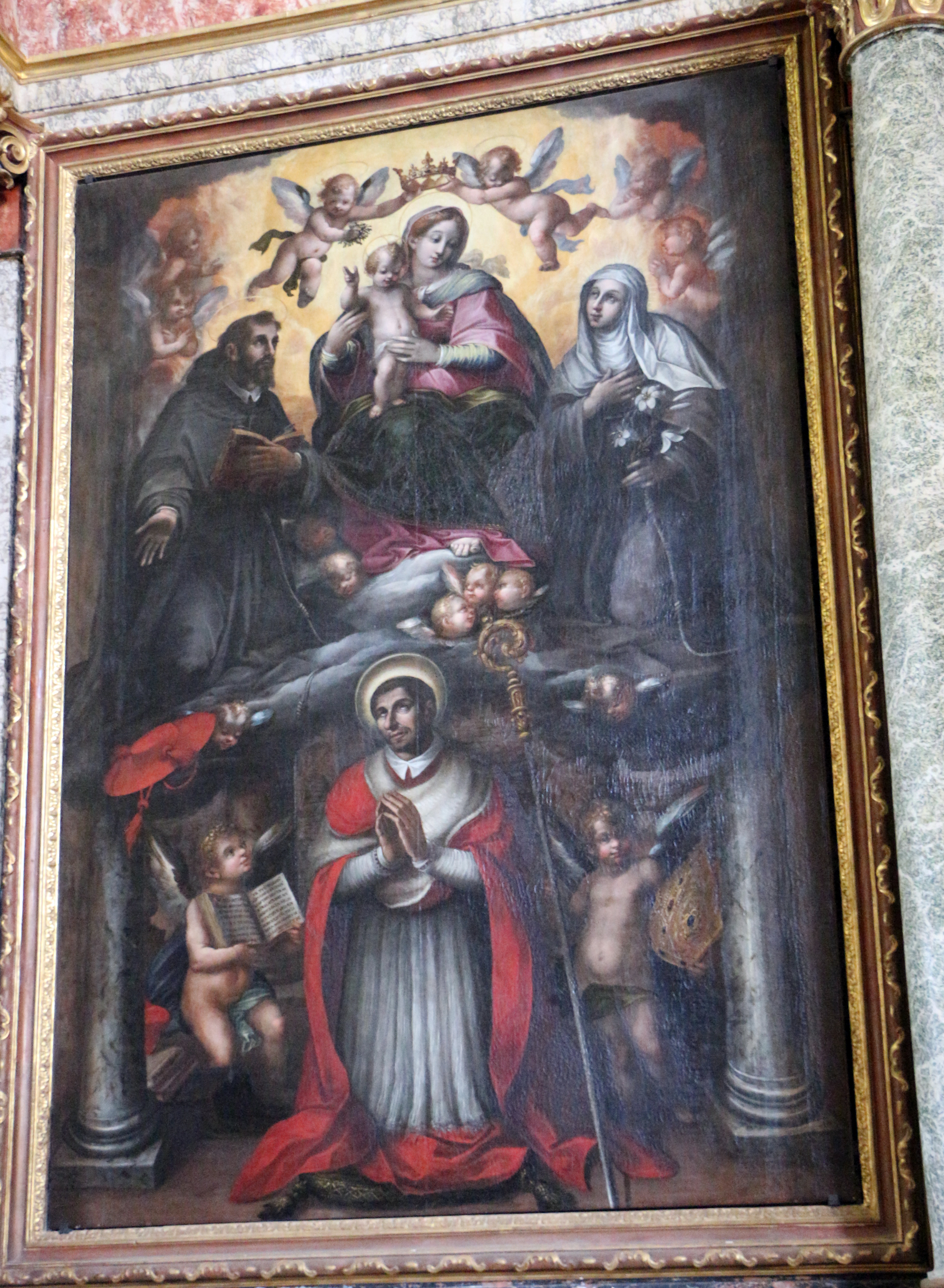
Madonna and saints, San Francesco (Gubbio)

Benedetto Bandiera (1557 or 1560–1634) was an Italian painter of the early-Baroque period. Born in Perugia, where he painted in the style of Federico Barocci. He painted frescoes in the convent adjacent to the Church of San Pietro of Perugia. There are paintings of his in the church and museum of San Francesco in Corciano.

Other works included:

- Three altarpiece at the Saint Catherine church in Perugia
- Saint Ursula, San Domenico, Perugia
- Saint Bonaventure, San Francesco, Perugia
- Virgin and Child, Saint John the Baptist, Palazzo Penna
