= Communion of the Apostles (Barocci) =

Painting by Federico Barocci

The Communion of the Apostles
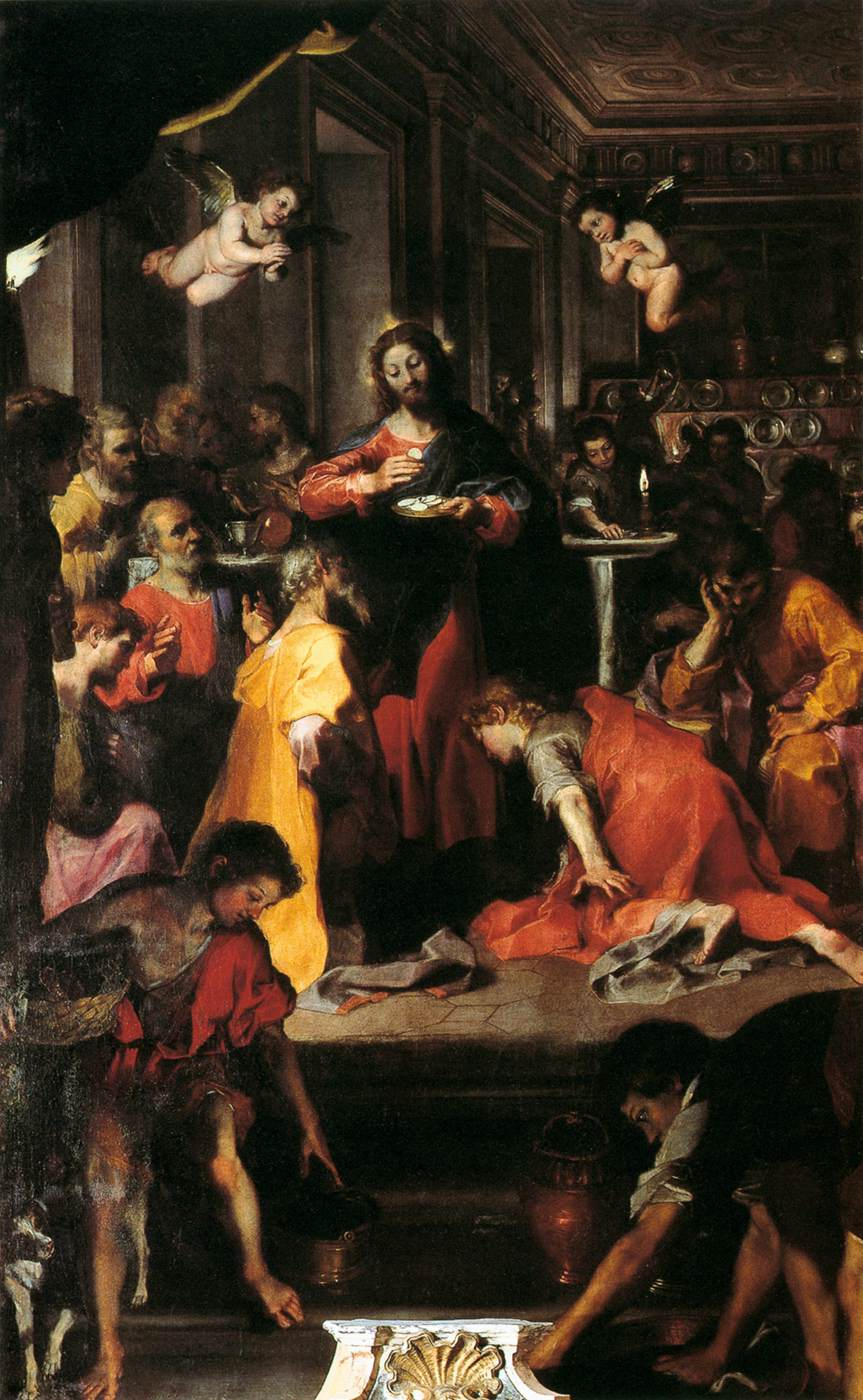
- Artist: Federico Barocci
- Year: c. 1603–1608
- Medium: Oil on canvas
- Dimensions: 290 cm × 177 cm (110 in × 70 in)
- Location: Santa Maria sopra Minerva; Rome

The Communion of the Apostles, or Institution of the Eucharist is a painting of the Last Supper by Federico Barocci located at Santa Maria sopra Minerva in Rome. It was commissioned for the family chapel of Pope Clement VIII Aldobrandini and completed between 1603 and 1608.

It was most likely the sight of Barocci's Presentation of the Virgin in the Chiesa Nuova at its unveiling in 1603 that led to the commission of the Communion four months later. On 13 August 1603 the pope communicated with the minister to Francesco Maria II della Rovere, duke of Urbino, Giacomo Sorbolongo, about acquiring an altarpiece from Barocci. (Note: Stasera uerso il tardi il Papa mi ha fatto chiamare, et quando sono stato dent'ro, mi ha detto ridendo, che se bene era cosa leggieri, per la quale mi hauea fatto dimandare, era per'o un suo gusto et seguit'o, come fa fabricare una Capella qui nella Minerua in memoria de' suoi, Padre, Madre et fratelli, et desiderando, che nell'altare di essa ci fosse il quadro fatto da uallente huomo, se bene qui ce ne sono et in particulare ha Iseppino, non dimeno si sodisfarebbe assai hauerlo di mano del Baroccio.) At this time the Cavaliere d'Arpino was the pope's most important artist; the letter goes on to ask that d'Arpino not be told of the commission. (Note: desidera non si sappia da altri tal pratica, massime per rispetto d'Iseppino)

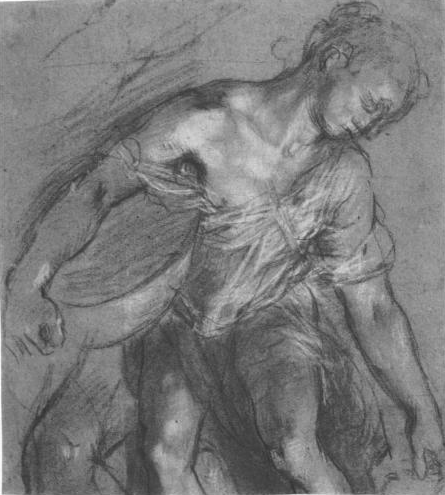
Study for the servant at the left front, ca. 1604

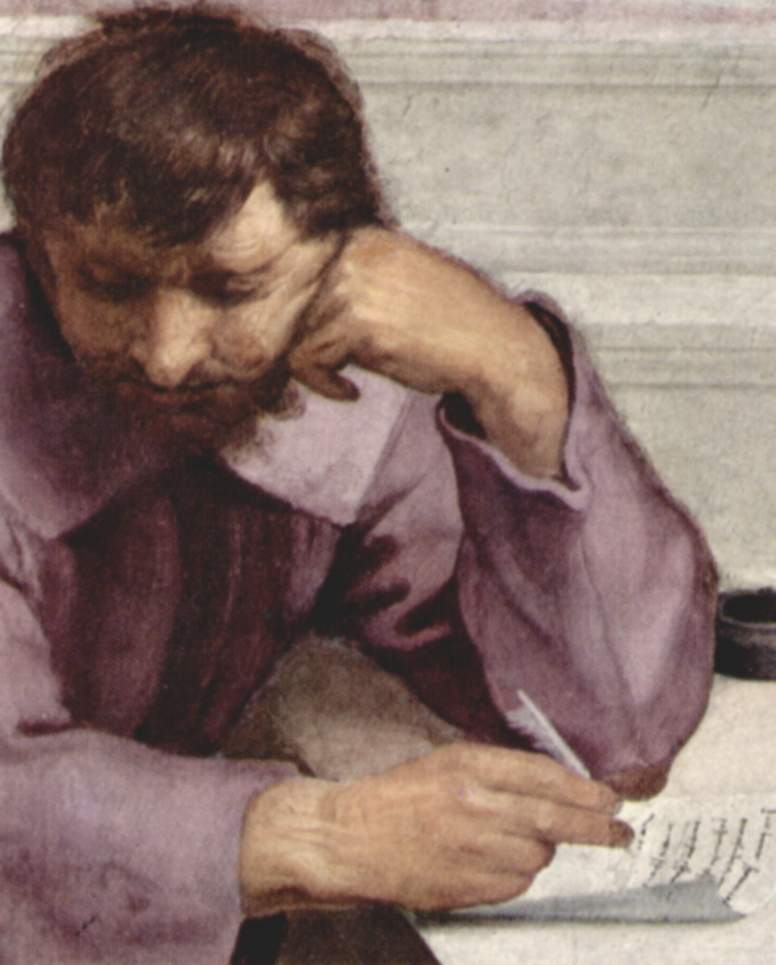
Detail from the School of Athens, Michelangelo as Heraclitus

The commission was completed entirely in Urbino and efforts were made to supply Barocci with extensive information about the contextual chapel, which was frescoed by Cherubino Alberti with a Triumph of the Holy Cross. Gian Pietro Bellori wrote that the pope was supplied with preparatory sketches. The pope sought the removal of Satan from the original design, and thereafter asked that it depict a night scene.

Barocci quotes from Raphael's School of Athens by inserting the portrait of Heraclitus, which many believe is a portrait of Michelangelo. Significantly, he depicts Judas Iscariot using Michelangelo's portrait. To an audience familiar with this association, this would have been taken as particularly strong commentary on the status of the Michelangelo. Furthermore, by directly quoting from Raphael, who was Michelangelo's antithesis and favoured by the Clementine church, Barocci, and by implication Pope Clement VIII, inserted a comment on the relative status of the two artists within the church of the time.

Barocci asked 1,500 scudi for the altarpiece. The fee undoubtedly was influenced by the number of figures. At the same point in his career (1604), he had accepted 300 scudi for a much simpler Crucifixion (Museo del Prado, Madrid).
