= Giulio Cesare Begni =

Italian painter

Giulio Cesare Begni (early 17th century) was an Italian painter active in the early-Baroque period, born in Pesaro, but also active in Fano, Cagli, Venice and Udine. He was a pupil of Antonio Cimatori (Visacci) in Urbino. His works included San Liborio (St. Liborius) at the Cagli Cathedral, Martyr of a Saint which is now at the Musée des Beaux-Arts, Rennes and frescoes of the Scenes of the Life of St Augustine at the cloister of an Augustinian monastery in Fano. Some sources say that he was active between 1620 and 1680.
