= Cagli =

- Comune
- Comune di Cagli
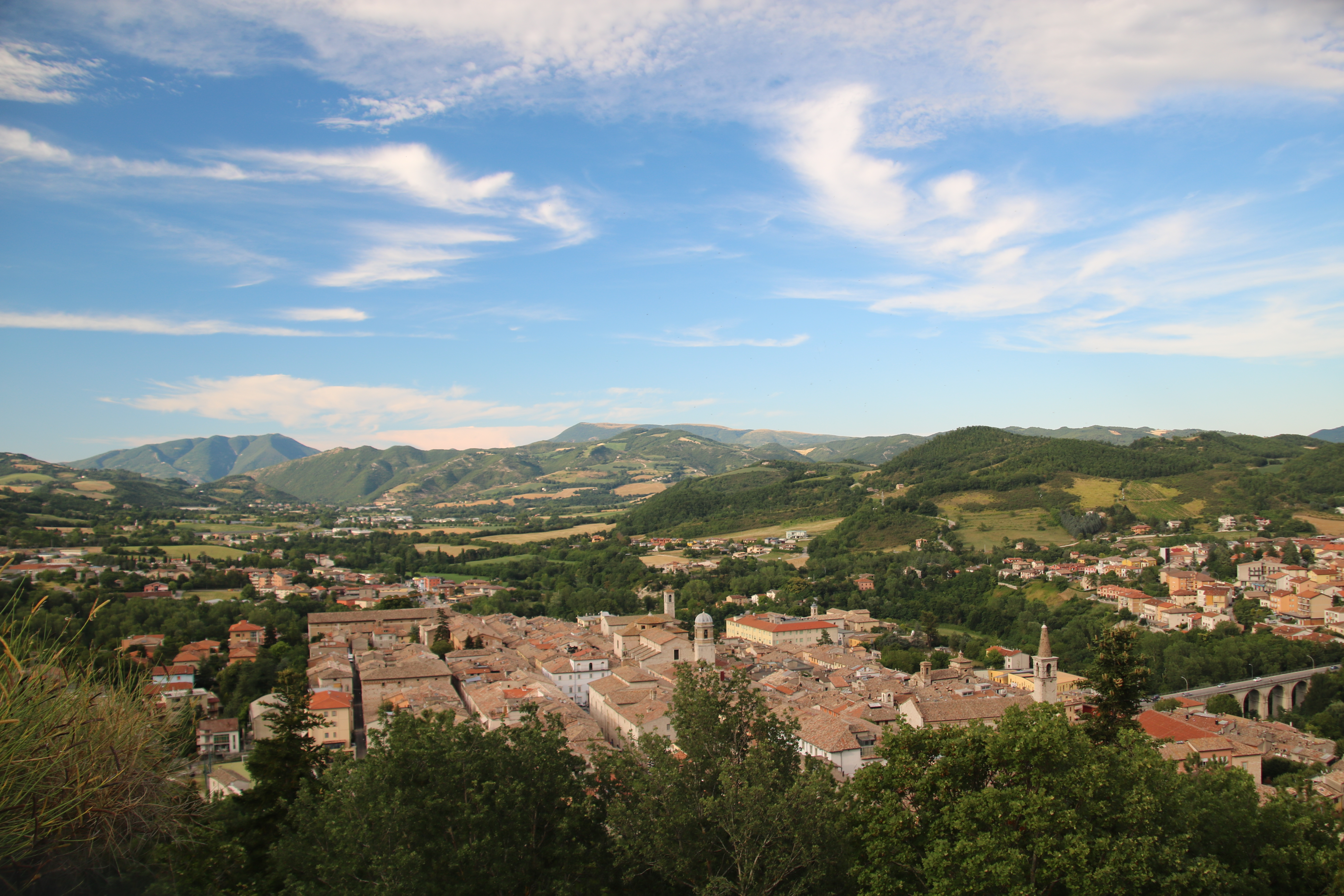
- View of Cagli

- Coat of arms

- Location within Italy Location within Marche
- Coordinates: 43°33′N 12°39′E
- Country: Italy
- Region: Marche
- Province: Pesaro e Urbino (PU)
- Frazioni: Abbadia di Naro, Acquaviva, Ca' Bargello, Cerreto, Foci, Massa, Moria, Paravento, Pianello, Pieia, Secchiano, Smirra

Government
  - Mayor: Alberto Alessandri

Area
  - Total: 226 km^{2} (87 sq mi)
- Elevation: 276 m (906 ft)

Population (30 April 2009)
  - Total: 9,053
  - Density: 40.1/km^{2} (104/sq mi)
- Demonym: Cagliesi
- Time zone: UTC+1 (CET)
  - Summer (DST): UTC+2 (CEST)
- Postal code: 61043
- Dialing code: 0721
- Patron saint: San Geronzio
- Saint day: 9 May
- Website: Official website

Cagli [ˈkaʎʎi] is a town and comune in the province of Pesaro e Urbino, Marche, central Italy. It is c. 30 kilometres (19 miles) south of Urbino. The Burano flows near the town.

== History ==
Cagli occupies the site of an ancient village on the Via Flaminia, which seems to have borne the name Cale, or Callium 39 km (24 mi) north of Helvillum (now Sigillo) and 29 km (18 mi) southwest of Forum Sempronii (now Fossombrone).

In the 6th century it was one of the strongholds of the Byzantine Pentapolis. A free commune was founded in Cagli at the end of the 12th century, and it quickly subdued more than 52 surrounding castles, overthrowing the rural lords and threatening the feudal powers of the abbots. Its expansion established the borders of the diocese of Cagli. When the city was partially destroyed by fire, started by Ghibelline factions in 1287, the settlement was moved down from the slopes of Monte Petrano and rebuilt anew on flatter land, incorporating the pre-existing suburb. The rebuilding of the city, under the patronage of Pope Nicholas IV, followed Arnolfo di Cambio's grid-pattern town plan. Cagli soon returned to being a prosperous centre. A register of taxes paid to the Church in 1312, revised after a heavy fall in population due to famine, shows that Cagli then numbered around 7,200 inhabitants. Shortly afterwards, in the Constitutiones Aegidianae of 1357, Cagli appeared among the nine major cities in the Marca (along with Pesaro, Fano and Fossombrone). The economic development of the city centred mainly on the manufacture of woollen cloth (later also silk) and the tanning of hides, industries that grew considerably under the dukes of Urbino.

When the Duchy of Urbino was handed over to the Papal States in 1631, Cagli became subject to the same economic policies as the rest of the Marche region, principally cereal cultivation. The low yields in the upland Apennine areas brought about an unstoppable decline.

The Unification of Italy stirred up strong anticlerical feelings. The building of the Fano-Fabriano-Rome railway, the construction of the new Municipal Theatre, and new public spaces gave substance to the progressive vision of the future. At the same time, the confraternities were stripped of their roles in city life and the monasteries were confiscated. Cagli's destiny was now absorbed within the wider context of Italy's national history. The railway line was destroyed by Nazi forces in 1944 and the Via Flaminia lost its importance as a major road, marking a long period of decline for Cagli and the surrounding valleys, which was to be reversed only towards the end of the second Millennium.

== Main sights ==
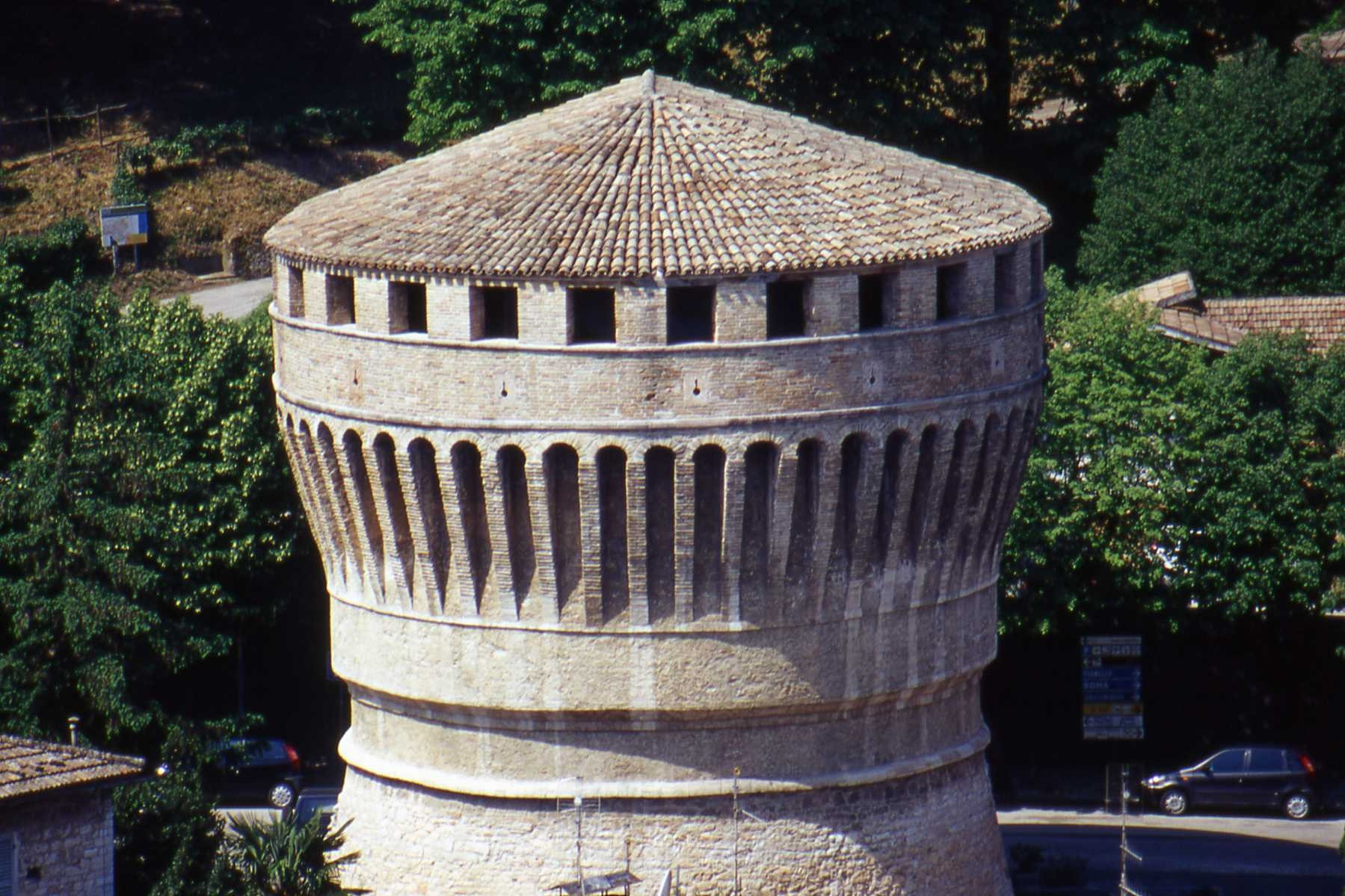
Torrione

=== Rocca Torrione ===
The fortified complex, built in 1481, was designed for Duke Federico III da Montefeltro by Francesco di Giorgio Martini. The latter in his Treatise, places Cagli as first among his six outstanding fortresses, and describes it in great detail with a certain degree of pride. Particularly unusual is the secret passage (the soccorso coverto) that links the tower to the imposing ruins of the diamond-shaped fortress (demolished in 1502). The fortifications date back to a time when architects like Francesco di Giorgio Martini were testing out innovative solutions to the problems posed by new developments in artillery.

Since 1989, the rooms of the tower - which have a certain sculptural form themselves - have hosted the Centre for Contemporary Sculpture, containing specially commissioned works by sculptors of international renown such.

=== San Francesco ===
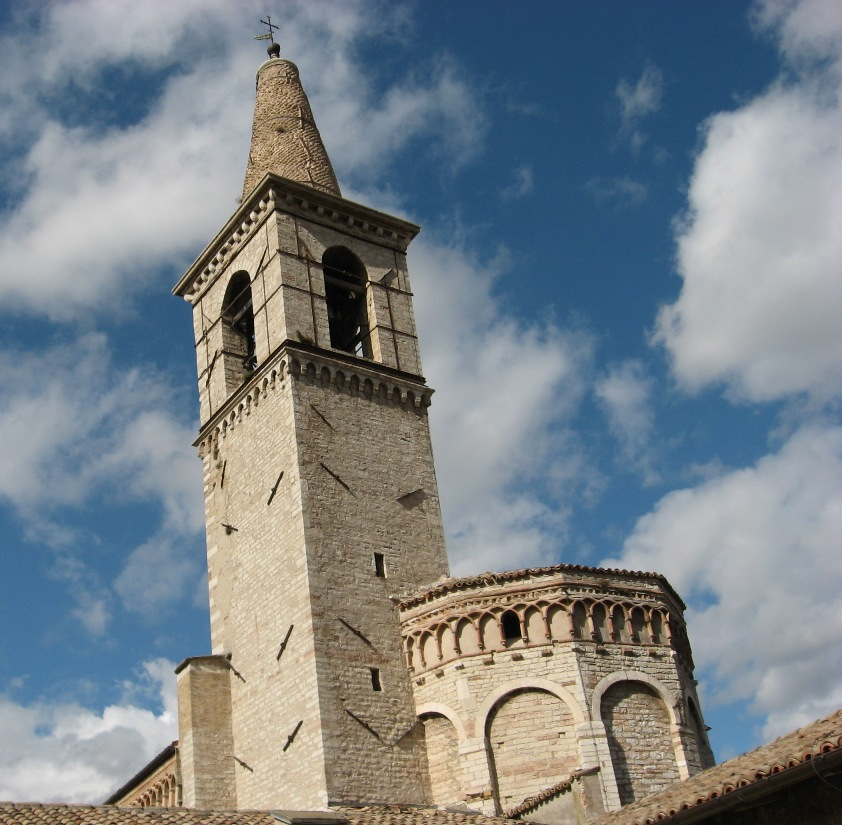
Cagli - Chiesa diSan Francesco

The Church of San Francesco, dating from 1234, is the pivot around which Cagli was rebuilt in 1289. The marble portal with its inlaid lintel and spiral columns (with the stylized owl on the lower left-hand side) dates from 1348.

In the interior, the recent dismantling of the 19th century vaulting above the apse has brought to light medieval vaulting above with a cycle of frescoes dating to the 1340s. These frescoes are believed to be the work of Mello da Gubbio and show influences of the Sienese painter Ambrogio Lorenzetti. On the side altars the principal works (counterclockwise from the right) are: two fragments of framed frescoes, once attributed to Antonio Alberti da Ferrara, now attributed to the Secondo Maestro of the Oratory of St John the Baptist, Urbino; the Miracles of the Snow by Ernst van Schayck(1617) and a young Gaetano Lapis (1730); a processional wooden crucifix, from the Northern European school, from the second half of the 15th century; an altarpiece (1540) by Raffaellino del Colle. The organ - attributed to Baldassarre Malamini - is the oldest in the Marche region and dates from the second half of the 16th century. Beside it, on the left, is one of three wash drawings by Battaglini da Imola from 1529 (the other two are beside the main altar).

In the piazza in front of the church is a bronze statue of Angelo Celli, by Angelo Biancini, erected in 1959, in front of the loggia built in 1885.

=== Church of Santa Maria della Misericordia ===
The church bears the same name as the confraternity that has been based here since 1301. The sturdy portal (1537) is topped by a 16th-century fresco of the Madonna della Misericordia. The interior was decorated with frescoes, of which several large fragments still remain: the Martyrdom of St Apollinia (1455) is by Jacopo Bedi from nearby Gubbio, while the others have elements that are reminiscent of the Basilica of San Francesco in Assisi. The main altar, with its 15th-century canopy with the Four Evangelists, also has a remarkable polychrome group in the niche depicting the Madonna della Misericordia. On the two side altars (c. 1625) are works by Claudio Ridolfi, and the predella showing the Massacre of the Innocents (1634) by Girolamo Cialdieri.

=== Church of Sant'Angelo Minore ===
Passing through the loggia (built in a 15th-century style, though erected in 1560), the interior has an elaborate main altar dating from the mid-17th century. Made from gilded and lacquered wood with great Solomonic columns, at its centre is the painting depicting Noli me tangere (1504), signed "THIMOTHEI DE VITE URBINAT. OPUS", a masterwork by Timoteo Viti, alongside his work in the mausoleum of the Dukes of Urbino.

=== Town Hall ===
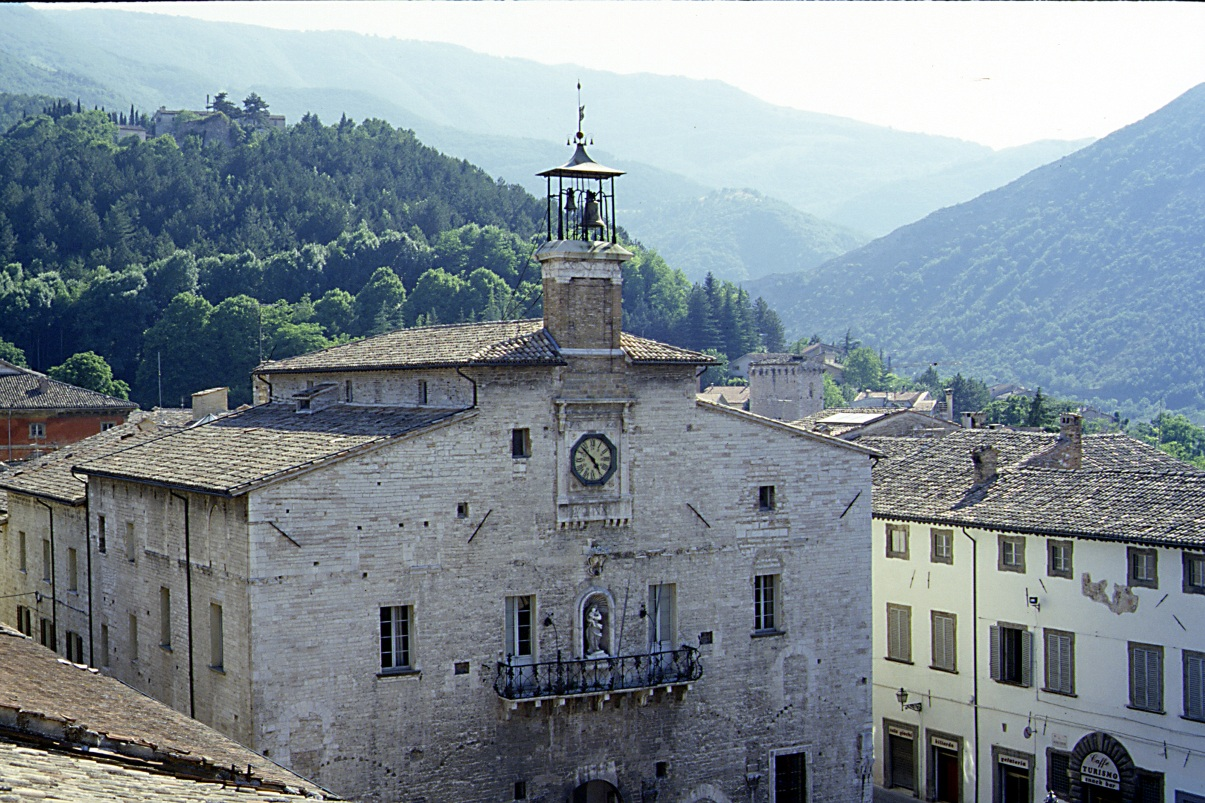
Palazzo Comunale.

Piazza Matteotti - once known as Piazza Maggiore - is dominated by the 13th century Palazzo Pubblico, or Town Hall, built to house the city's governors. The building, onto which was added the Palazzo del Podestà (the monumental façade overlooks via Alessandri), was donated by the Comune to Federico III da Montefeltro in 1476. The Duke commissioned Francesco di Giorgio Martini to transform it into a ducal palace, but the works were never completed. The lowering of the raised entrance, the creation of a loggia(of which only the benches and corbels remain), and the vaulted rooms on the ground floor, all date from this period. The area around the clock on the façade date from 1575, while the statue of the "Madonna with Child" is from 1680 and was commissioned in Venice.

To the side of the undecorated entrance are three standard measuring units: piede (foot), braccio (arm) and canna (cane): to these should be added the stub of a Roman column known as the "Cagliese quarter" now positioned just inside the main room on the ground floor. The fresco in the lunette on the back wall is of the Madonna with Child, St Michael Archangel and St Gerontius (1536) attributed to Giovanni Dionigi. Also on show - as an extension to the Archeological Museum - are objects including ducal coats of arms of both the Montefeltro and Della Rovere families, communal emblems - including one of St Michael - and a pair of dolphins. From the Entrance Hall, the door to the left of the entrance from the piazza takes you down to the segrete, a dungeon-like basement with ceramic fragments discovered during excavation works, and Medieval masonry including a civic coat of arms, capitols, a rose boss, a garland carving, and drain covers from the civic aqueduct.

Heading out of the Sala del General Consiglio the passageway under the fresco is framed by a 15th-century doorway decorated with the emblems of Duke Federico in bas-relief. From here one enters the courtyard. At its centre is the sculpture "Ordine Cosmico" (1997) by Eliseo Mattiacci. The Archaeological Museum (currently being enlarged) occupies parts of the 13th century Palazzo del Podestà. The fountain at the centre of Piazza Matteotti was built in 1736 by Giovanni Fabbri, to a design by Anton Francesco Berardi the younger.

=== Cagli Cathedral ===
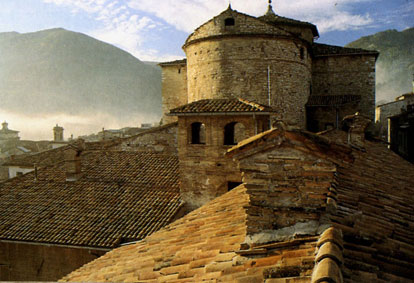
View of the Cathedral.

This basilica church has been modified over the centuries. The Gothic portal (1424) can still be seen on the left wall; it was sculpted by Maestro Antonio di Cristoforo of Cagli and the 17th century painted decoration is by Lodovico Viviani. After the damaging earthquake in 1781, Pietro Giacomo Patriarca's tall dome was replaced by the present-day rounded vault. The bell tower is topped by an octagonal brick belfry (1790) designed by Giovanni Antinori. The main works are: in the right nave, the altarpieces by Gaetano Lapis (1758) (2nd chapel) and by Sebastiano Conca (1720) (3rd chapel); in the transept, The Patron Saints (1704) by Luigi Garzi and the Madonna and Child with Saints Peter and John the Baptist commissioned in 1695 by the Medicis of Florence and painted by a member of the Nasini family; in the Chapel of the Blessed Sacrament, two canvases by Gaetano Lapis (1754 and 1756); in the left nave, an Annunciation from the workshop of Barocci, a fragment of a 16th-century fresco of the Immaculate Conception attributed to Giuliano Persciutti of Fano (though perhaps by Dionigi of Cagli), and the 17th century Eternal Father by the local artist Giambattista Gambarini in the tympanum above the altar. The organ was built by Nicola Morettini in 1889.

=== Church of San Domenico ===
The church was built by the Celestines, a branch of the Benedictine order, after the reconstruction of the city in 1289. The front portal dates from 1483, the apse from 1655 and the bell tower from 1654. Inside, the principal works are by Giovanni Santi, father of Raphael. These are (from the left) the funeral monument with a fresco of Christ in the Tomb between Saints Jerome and Bonaventure(1481) and the celebrated Tiranni Chapel, considered to be his masterpiece, which dates from the early 1490s. Beside the Virgin's throne, the work depicts an angel gazing outwards from the scene; it is traditionally believed that this is a portrait of Raphael as a child, while the face of St John the Baptist appears to be a self-portrait of Santi himself. On the opposite wall of the church, in a niche, is the 16th century Annunciation, once attributed to Girolamo Genga and more recently to Timoteo Viti. Beside it is the Presentation in the Temple by Gaetano Lapis. 14th-century frescoes can be seen beneath the 1576 layer of plaster. In the spacious crypt (stairs to the side of the Tiranni Chapel) is a cycle of frescoes by Antonio Viviani.

=== Other sights ===
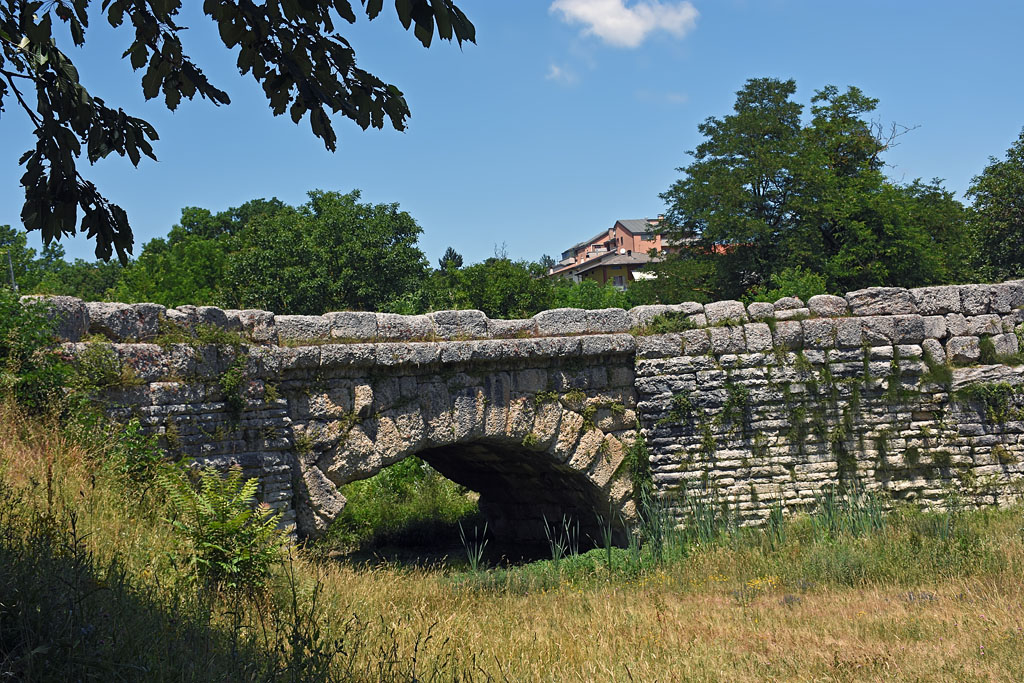
Ponte Mallio

About 8 kilometres (5 miles) to the northwest of Cagli and 4 km (2 mi) west of the Via Flaminia, at the modern Acqualagna, is the site of an ancient town; the place is now called piano di Valeria, and is scattered with ruins. Inscriptions show that this was a Roman stronghold, perhaps Pitinum Mergens.

Other sights in the town include:

- Ponte Mallio, dating to Roman Republican times (220 BC): it is one of the most imposing Roman remains along the ancient consular road, the via Flaminia. The bridge was built using large blocks (some more than a cubic metre) of which were put into place without mortar. The section of dressed cornelian stone dates from a later restoration, perhaps at the beginning of the Roman Imperial period.
- Municipal theatre, opened in 1878 and designed by Giovanni Santini.
- Palazzo Berardi Mochi-Zamperoli, enlarged in the early 17th century, to designs by Anton Francesco Berardi. Its architecture was further refined in the 18th century by another Berardi (Anton Francesco junior). Beneath the frescoed upper rooms, decorated by pupils of Barocci, on the ground floor is the Polo Culturale di Eccellenza, with libraries and archives (in preparation), while on the top floor is the Centro di Documentazione della Scultura (in preparation) with drawings and models of public sculptures by 20th century Italian artists. On the main piano nobile various art exhibitions take place during the year.
- Church of San Giuseppe. This church was once known as Sant'Angelo Maggiore, and was used by the city's governors. Its barrel-vaulted interior is decorated with Mannerist stucco-work. The paintings portray events from the life of St Joseph, while high-relief figures (kings, patriarchs and biblical figures) decorate the niches around the walls. At the centre of the vaulting is Charity, linked by Telamons to the other Theological Virtues. On the two late-16th century side altars are plaster statues of "St Joseph" and "Our Lady of Sorrows", with ornate plaques. On the high altar is an Archangel Michael (1764) between 17th-century frescoes by Girolamo Cialdieri.
- San Nicolo: church and monastery date to 1398.
- San Giuseppe: Franciscan church

== Events ==
- Distinti Salumi is a national celebration of Italian and international charcuterie takes place annually, at the end of April when the town showcases the best charcuterie from the rich gastronomic culture of Italy. Cagli is now known as a national marketplace for high-quality charcuterie and is seeking to become a leader in the promotion of traditional breeds, free range pigs and the production of top quality meat and charcuterie.
- Procession of Cristo Morto, held in the late afternoon of Good Friday: after the deposition in the Cathedral, it ends in front of the church of San Giuseppe, where the two images of Our Lady of Sorrows and Christ are brought before each other. In the evening, four hundred confraternity members, barefoot and hooded, from five confraternities form the religious procession that precedes the carriage bearing the veiled statue of the Dead Christ, in a ritual that remains unchanged since the 16th century.
- Corpus Christi procession The city's streets are carpeted with flowers, arranged by citizens and worshippers as a demonstration of popular piety, for the procession in which the priest carries the consecrated host, under a rich canopy, accompanied by members of the Confraternity of the Blessed Sacrament.
- Palio and Gioco dell'Oca. Old rivalries between Cagli's historic Quarters form the background to this competition, which traces its history back to 1543. The Eve of the event (the 2nd Saturday of August) begins with the investiture of the Captains and the offering of oil to the patron saint. In the evening everyone gathers in the Quarters to share traditional dishes, hoping that fortune will be on their side. On the day of the Palio (the 2nd Sunday of August) the Magistrate, accompanied in procession, displays the trophy of the golden goose. Dice throwers move the score-markers of the respective Quarters on a 54-square board, while young players battle each other in contests which moves them backwards or forwards on the board until the winner is proclaimed. In the evening, there is general celebration or consolation in the outdoor taverns of the four Quarters.

== See also ==
- Roman Catholic Diocese of Cagli-Pergola
- Roman Catholic Diocese of Fano-Fossombrone-Cagli-Pergola
