= San Francesco, Cagli =

Roman Catholic Church in Cagli, Italy

Coordinates: 43.5457°N 12.6486°E

San Francesco
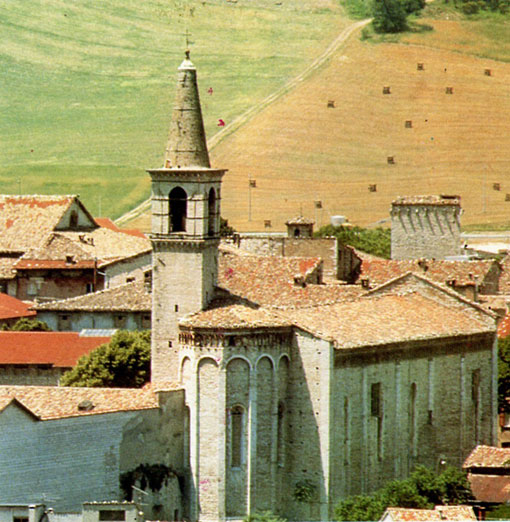

Religion
- Affiliation: Roman Catholic

Location
- Location: Cagli, Marche, Italy
- Interactive map of San Francesco

Architecture
- Style: Gothic architecture
- Completed: 1240

San Francesco is a Gothic-style, Roman Catholic, Franciscan church in Cagli, province of Pesaro e Urbino, region of Marche, Italy.

== History ==
Construction of this church began in 1234 and was completed in 1240; at the time, it was outside the city walls. The polychrome marble portal (1348) with its inlaid lintel and spiral columns is sculpted with animal and vegetal motifs. The lunette above has a much repainted fresco of the Madonna del Soccorso with Saints Francis and John the Baptist, attributed to Guido Palmerucci. The entire structure including the bell-tower are tall, as is typical for Gothic architecture.

At one period, the choir displayed a polyptych (1465) by Niccolò Alunno; but that was looted by the Napoleonic forces and now is called the Polyptych of Cagli and housed in Milan at the Pinacoteca di Brera. An original altarpiece by Simone Cantarini was also looted, and now houses a Miracle of the Snow (1617) by Ernst van Schayck.

In 1579, frescoes in the apse were covered over with stucco. In the 19th century, the cycle of frescoes, dating to the 1340s, were recovered. For example, one (1438), one depicting a Saint Antony of Padua and the Eucharistic Miracle of the Mule in Rimini once attributed to Antonio Alberti of Ferrara, now attributed to the Secondo Maestro of the Oratory of St John the Baptist, Urbino. Others are attributed Mello da Gubbio and show influences of the Sienese painter Ambrogio Lorenzetti. Two fragments of 14th century frescoes on the counter façade are attributed to the circle of the Maestro of Montemartello. On the side altars the principal works (counterclockwise from the right) are: paintings by Gaetano Lapis (1730); a processional wooden crucifix (after 1750) from the Northern European school. The late-16th-century organ is attributed to Baldassarre Malamini . Beside it, on the left, is one of three wash drawings by Battaglini da Imola from 1529 (the other two are beside the main altar).

The second altar on the right was made in 1598 by Taddeo Bonaventura from Città di Castello. It once held a canvas by Federico Barocci that moved to Rome. It is replaced by the 1938 painting depicting Jesus appears to Santa Rita.

The 3rd altar on the left has a canvas depicting the Miracle of the Madonna of the Snows (1730) by Gaetano Lapis. Beside the altar is the tomb (1372) of the Blessed Giovannino by Antonio da Cagli. The lateral walls has canvases depicting an Enthroned Madonna and Child with the Magdalen, and Saints Chlare and Monica, Ludovico, and Anthony of Padua (1529) by Francesco Battaglini. In the center of the apse above the wooden choir is the 17th-century altarpiece of the Stigmata of St Francis.

The second altar (1622) to the left was created by Elpidio Finale. The bas-reliefs depict scenes from the life of Franciscan Saints.

The first altar on the left houses an altarpiece depicting Madonna and Child with Saints Roch, Francis, Geronzio, Stefano e Sebastiano (1540) by Raffaellino del Colle.

In the piazza in front of the church is a bronze statue of Angelo Celli, by Angelo Biancini, erected in 1959, in front of the loggia built in 1885.
