= San Nicolo, Cagli =

Catholic Church in Cagli, Italy

San Nicolò is a Roman Catholic, Franciscan church in Cagli, province of Pesaro e Urbino, region of Marche, Italy.

== History ==
The Benedictine order church and monastery date to 1388 when the nuns of Santa Margherita, who until then had occupied the old monastery along the Via Flaminia near Campo Ventoso relocated to San Nicolo. In 1529, the monastery was assigned to cloistered Dominican nuns. In 1700 a large part of the convent was restored with the construction of small cells, and a new refectory. Following the suppression of religious orders and congregations implemented with royal decree 3036 of 7 July 1866, around 1880 the monastery was alienated in order to erect a girls' school.

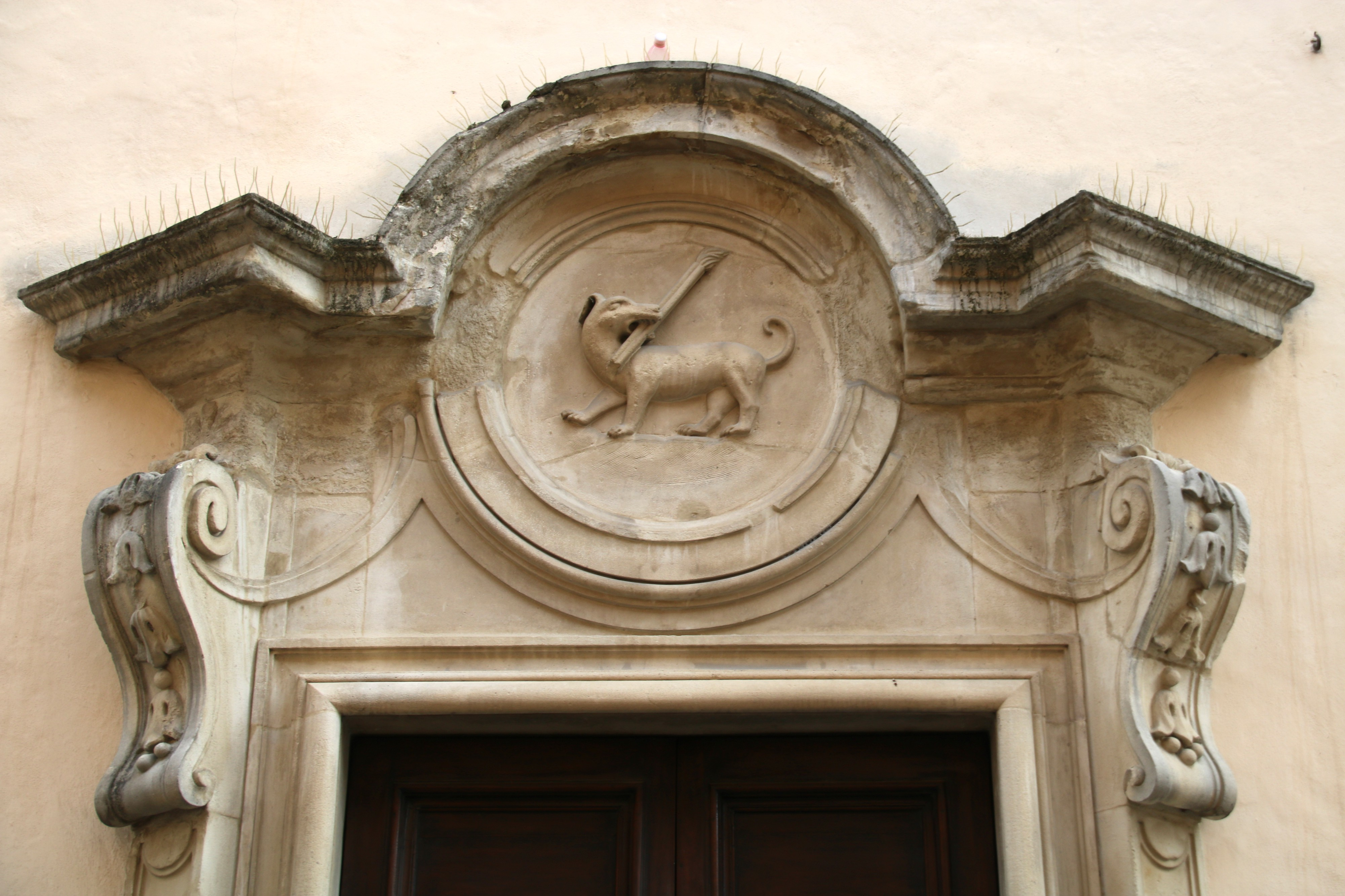
Chiesa di San Nicolò (Cagli), 02

The portal of the church, in sandstone, has a dog with a candle in its mouth in bas-relief in the tympanum, a play on the phrase Domini canes, or ("Hounds of the Lord"). On the side of the main entrance there is access to the cloistered convent.

The church has a single nave, with a vault decorated in 1758 with the symbols of San Nicolò, a miter and crozier.

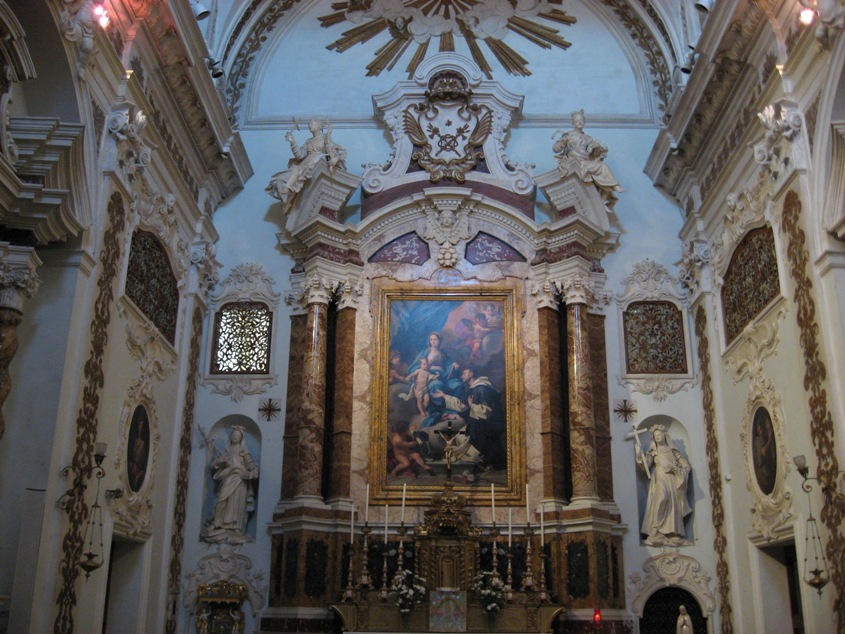
Church of San Nicolò, main altar, Cagli

The main altar was consecrated on 16 November 1749. Above the high altar is the dove of the Holy Spirit placed in the center of a large sunburst. The altarpiece, by Gaetano Lapis, depicts the "Madonna of the Rosary and St Dominic". It was stolen during the Napoleonic period but subsequently returned. On either side of the main altar are statues of Dominican saints Catherine of Siena and Rose of Lima. On the left side of the altar, under a small canopy supported by two angels, there is a small door with a chalice in bas-relief through which the cloistered nuns receive communion.

In the left side altar the "Miracle of Soriano" is represented, in the right side altar the "Miracle of San Nicola di Bari" is depicted.

== See also ==
- Catholic Church in Italy
