= San Giuseppe, Cagli =

Church in Cagli, Italy

Coordinates: 43.5460°N 12.6478°E

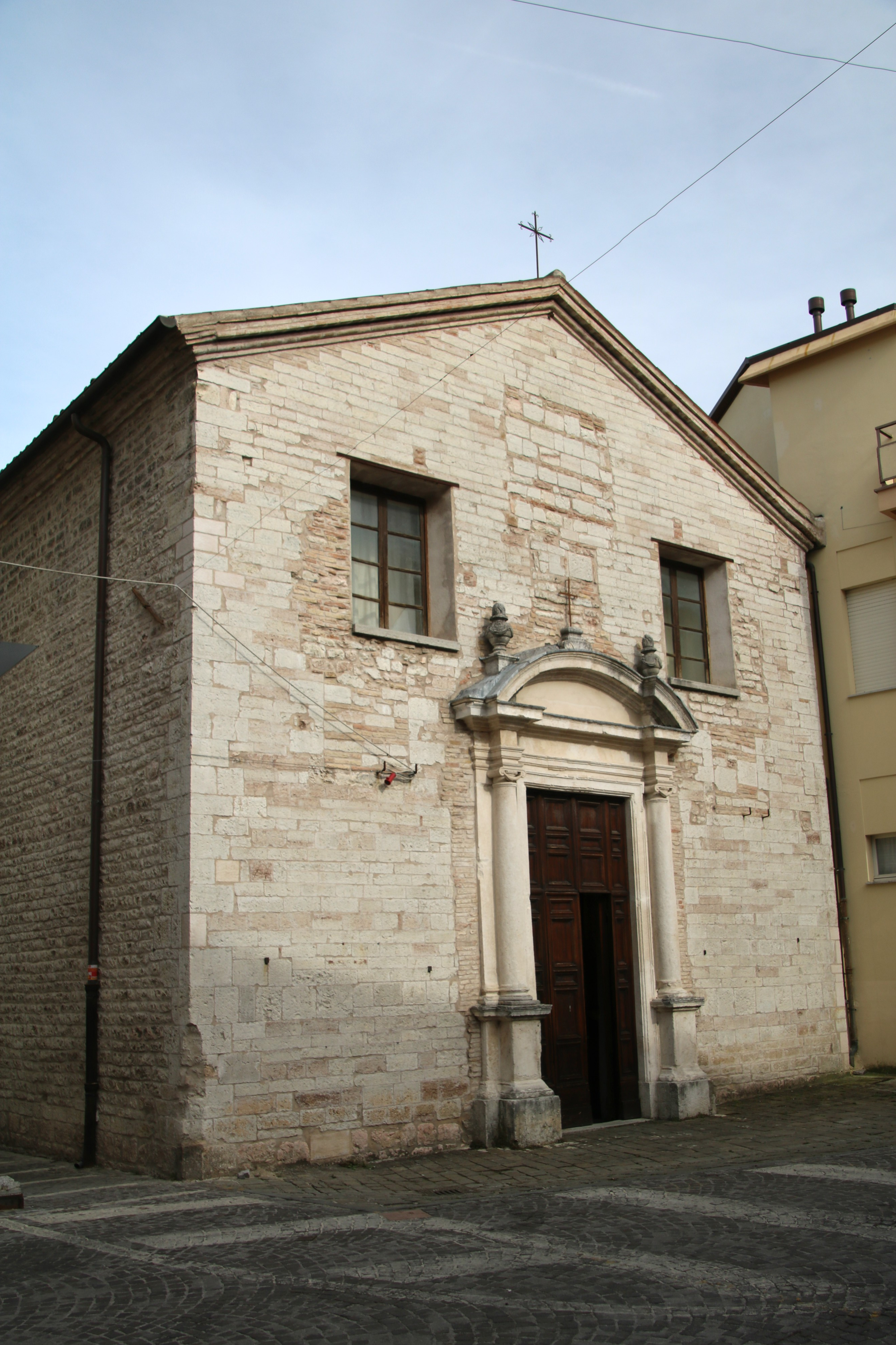
exterior

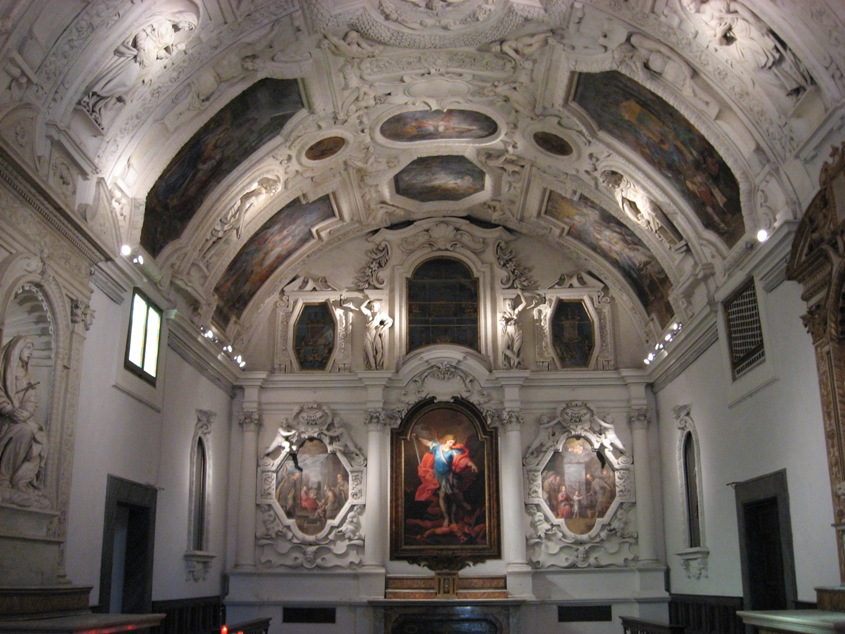
Interior of Saint Joseph Church in Cagli, Marche, Italy

San Giuseppe is a Roman Catholic, Franciscan church in Cagli, province of Pesaro e Urbino, region of Marche, Italy.

== History ==
The exterior of the church is plain, in unfinished stone with walled up windows. The church interiors were refurbished with stuccoes in Baroque fashion by the school of the Brandani. The 17th-century frescoes were painted by Cialdieri and the main altarpiece depicting the Archangel Michael (1764) was painted by Gaetano Lapis.
