= Cagli Cathedral =

Roman Catholic cathedral in Marche, Italy

Coordinates: 43.5471°N 12.6489°E

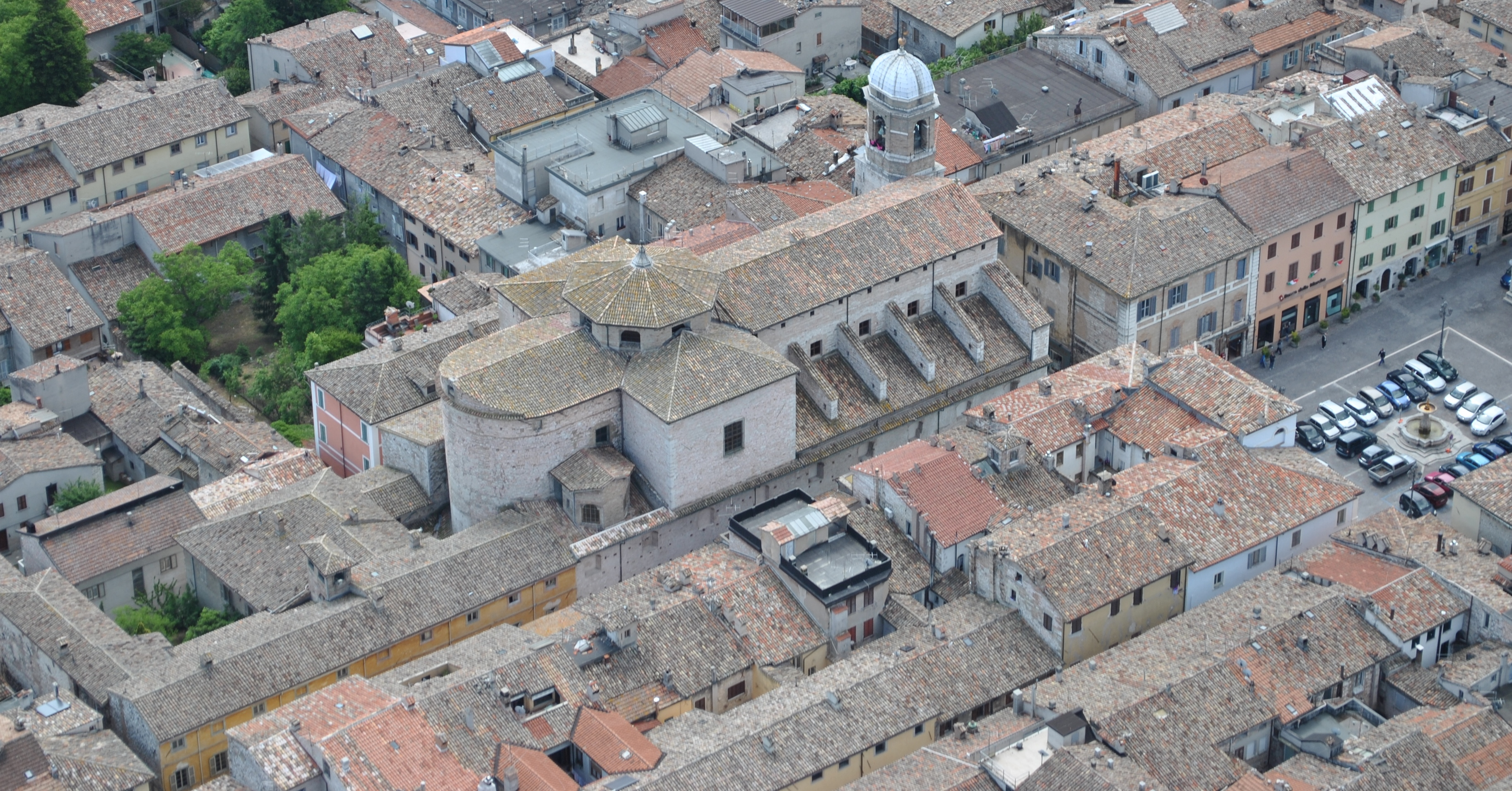
Aerial view of the cathedral

Cagli Cathedral (Italian: Duomo di Cagli; Basilica Concattedrale di Santa Maria Assunta) is a Roman Catholic cathedral in the town of Cagli, in the province of Pesaro and Urbino, region of Marche, Italy, dedicated to the Assumption of the Virgin Mary. It was formerly the episcopal seat of the Diocese of Cagli; since 1986 it has been a co-cathedral in the Diocese of Fano-Fossombrone-Cagli-Pergola. It was granted the status of a minor basilica in 1982.

== History ==
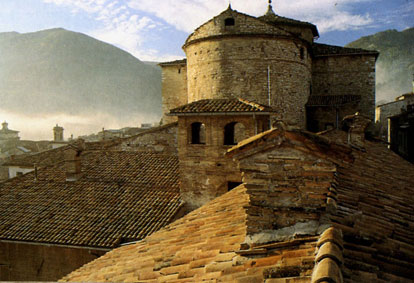
View of the apse (east end of the cathedral)

Construction of a cathedral on the site began in 1292, and was not complete until the early 15th century. The structure as seen today was rebuilt in 1646. It still has a rounded apse, and buttresses along the nave. The Gothic portal (1413) of the previous church was retained.

== Artworks ==
The interior houses canvases by a number of prominent artists. In the second chapel on the south nave are paintings of 1758 depicting Sant'Andrea Avellino, Communion of the Apostles and the Gathering of Manna by Gaetano Lapis. In the third chapel on the same nave is an altarpiece depicting the Madonna del Carmine (1720) by Sebastiano Conca. In the transept is a painting of The Patron Saints of Cagli (1704) by Luigi Garzi and the Madonna and Child with Saints Peter and John the Baptist commissioned in 1695 by the Medicis of Florence and painted by a member of the Nasini family. In the Chapel of the Blessed Sacrament are two further canvases (1754 and 1756) by Gaetano Lapis.

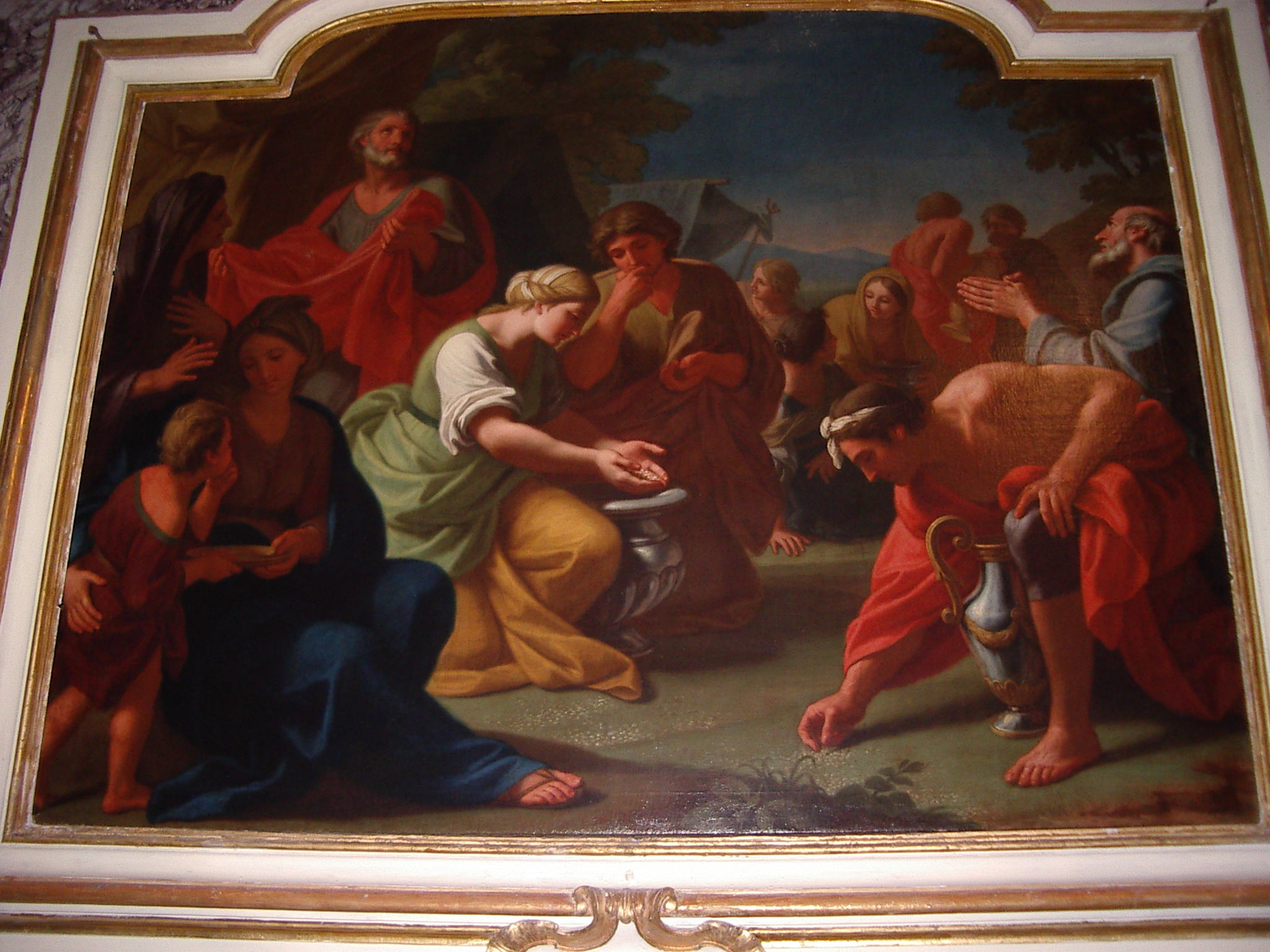
Gathering of Manna by Gaetano Lapis

In the north nave is an Annunciation, a copy of a painting by Federico Barocci, completed by his studio, and a fragment of a 16th-century fresco of the Immaculate Conception attributed to Giuliano Persciutti of Fano (though perhaps by Dionigi of Cagli). There is a 17th-century representation of the Eternal Father by the local artist Giambattista Gambarini in the tympanum above the altar. The organ was built by Nicola Morettini in 1889.

== See also ==
- Catholic Church in Italy
