= Santa Caterina da Siena a Via Giulia =

- Church of Saint Catherine of Siena on the Julian Way
- Chiesa di Santa Caterina da Siena a Via Giulia
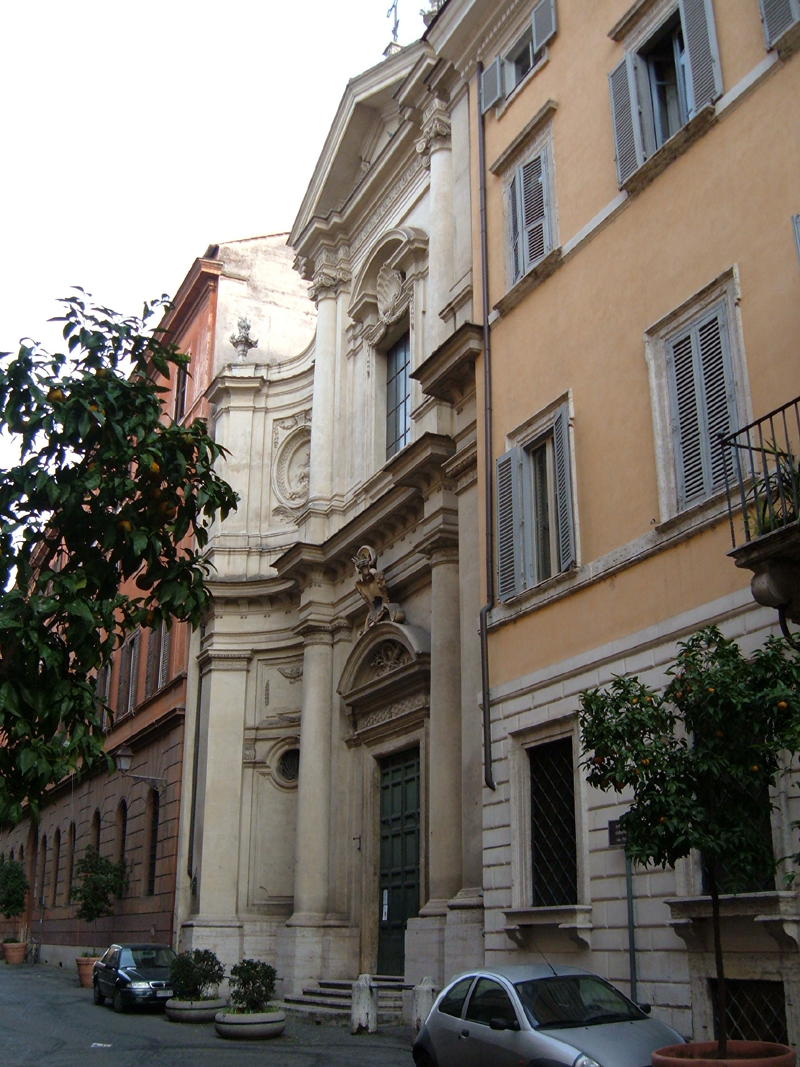
- Click on the map for a fullscreen view
- 41°53′44″N 12°28′08″E
- Location: Via Giulia/Via Monserrato 62/A, Regola, Rome
- Country: Italy
- Language: Italian
- Denomination: Catholic
- Tradition: Roman Rite
- Website: arciconfraternitasantacaterina.it

History
- Status: regional church
- Dedication: Catherine of Siena

Architecture
- Functional status: active
- Architectural type: Baroque
- Groundbreaking: 1526

Administration
- Diocese: Rome

Santa Caterina da Siena is a church in Rome dedicated to Catherine of Siena. It is sited on via Giulia in the Regola district.

== History ==
This church is indissolubly linked to the history of the Archconfraternity of Siena in Rome, to which it still belongs. A sizable Sienese community in Rome was established at the end of the 14th century, and first used the church of Santa Maria in Monterone as its home before shifting to Santa Maria sopra Minerva (site of Catherine of Siena's tomb) around the middle of the 15th century. In 1461, the year of Catherine's canonization, it moved again, this time to San Nicola degli Incoronati on via Giulia - Sienese merchants and bankers had been living on that street since the end of the 15th century.

In 1519 the Sienese association was officially recognised as a confraternity by pope Leo X. It was decided to build a new church, an oratory for the confraternity and a clergy house. Work began in 1526 to designs by Baldassarre Peruzzi and financed by members of the Sienese nobility based in Rome, most notably cardinal Giovanni Piccolomini and the banker Agostino Chigi.

In 1736 the confraternity became an archconfraternity. The church fell into disrepair due to the Tiber flooding and so it was completely rebuilt to designs by Paolo Posi between 1766 and 1775, the year in which a new altar was consecrated. The previous church is described in documents in the archconfraternity archives as having three altars, with a Girolamo Genga painting of the Resurrection on the high altar (now in the archconfraternity's oratory) and frescoes in the side chapels by Timoteo della Vite (a pupil of Raphael) and Antiveduto Gramatica (who was buried in the church).

== References and Bibliography ==
- Federica Papi, Santa Caterina da Siena, in Roma Sacra. Guida alle chiese della Città eterna, 12º itinerario, 1995, pp. 8–12
- Mariano Armellini, Le chiese di Roma dal secolo IV al XIX, Roma 1891, p. 423
- Christian Hülsen, Le chiese di Roma nel Medio Evo, Firenze 1927, p. 530
- Antonio Nibby, Roma nell’anno MDCCCXXXVIII, Parte prima moderna, Roma 1839, pp. 153–155
- Claudio Rendina, Le Chiese di Roma, Newton & Compton Editori, Milano 2000, p. 60
- Mauro Quercioli, Rione VII Regola, in AA.VV, I rioni di Roma, Newton & Compton Editori, Milano 2000, Vol. II, pp. 457–458
- Guida d'Italia. Roma, Touring Club Italiano, Milano 1992, p. 350
