= Paolo Posi =

Italian architect (1708–1776)

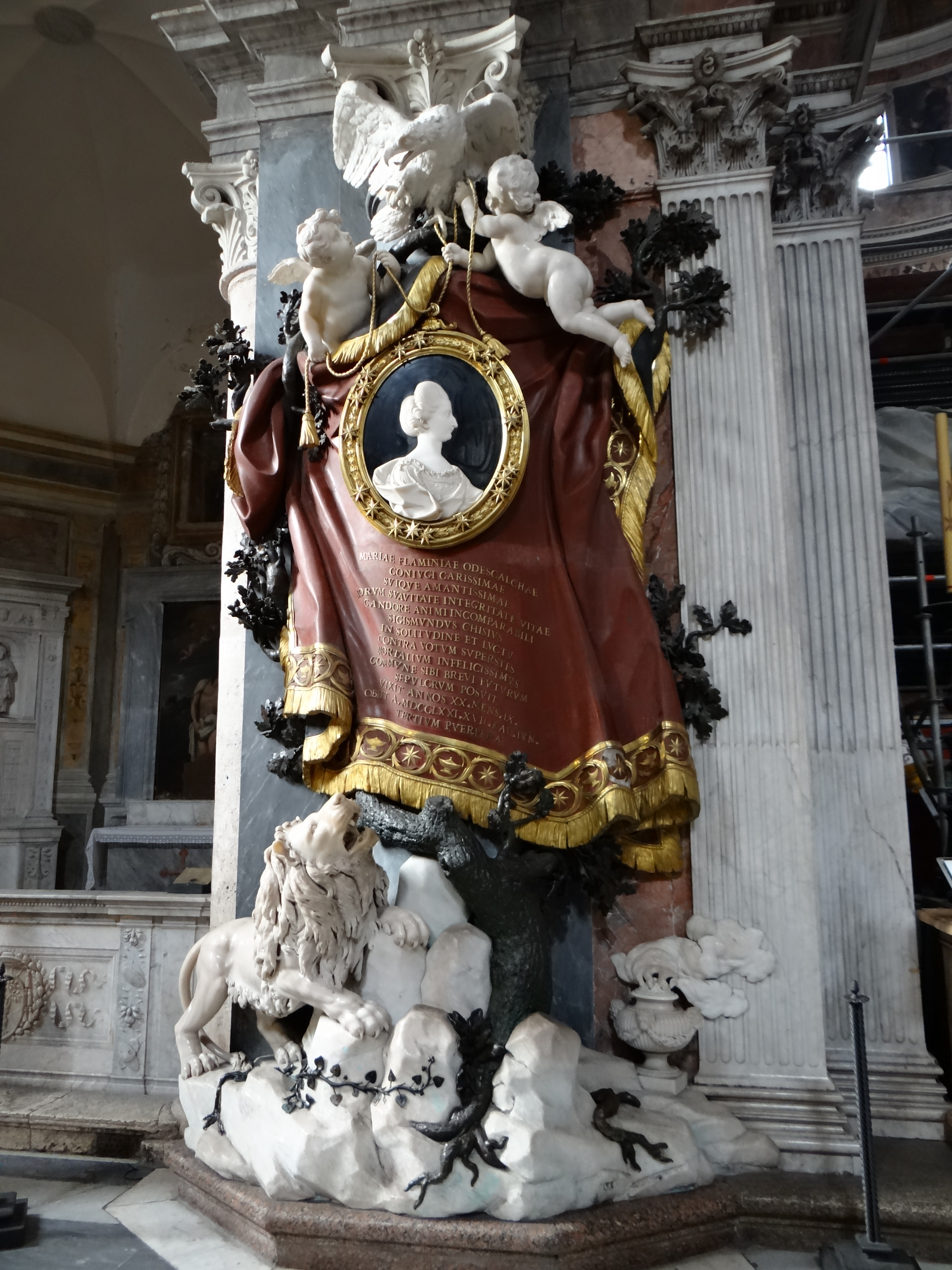
- Maria Flaminia Chigi-Odescalchi's tomb
- Born: 1708; Siena, Grand Duchy of Tuscany
- Died: 3 January 1776 (aged 67–68); Rome, Papal States
- Resting place: Santi Bonifacio ed Alessio, Rome
- Education: Accademia di San Luca
- Known for: Architecture, painting
- Movement: Baroque and Rococo

Paolo Posi (1708 – 3 January 1776) was an Italian architect of the late-Baroque period. Among the cities in which he was active were Rome, Narni, and Viterbo. Among the other works, he designed mausoleums for Cardinal Innico Caracciolo in Aversa, Cardinal Giuseppe Renato Imperiali in the church of Sant'Agostino in Rome, for cardinal Carafa in Sant'Andrea delle Fratte (1759), and for princess Maria Flaminia Chigi-Odescalchi (1771) in the church of Santa Maria del Popolo.

== Works ==
=== Early career ===
Posi was born in Siena. He studied at the Accademia di San Luca in Rome. From 1751 onwards he was the family architect of the Colonna family. He completed the restoration of the Palazzo Colonna, which had been started in 1731 by Nicola Michetti and Gaetano Chiaveri. This position, however, established him more as a designer than as an architect; he was better known for his numerous monuments and stage designs. In a series of minor works he continued the Baroque manner into a period when Neoclassicism was more generally in favour in Rome.

Posi became accomplished in developing decorative compositions within an architectural framework, for example in the tomb of Cardinal Pier Luigi Carafa in Sant'Andrea delle Fratte; the tomb of Maria Flaminia Chigi-Odescalchi in Santa Maria del Popolo, a violently exuberant late Baroque funerary monument, with bronze draperies and marble statuary executed by Agostino Penna; the altar of San Michele (1741) in Santa Maria dell'Orazione e Morte; the tomb (1741) of Cardinal Giuseppe Renato Imperiali in Sant'Agostino, carved by Pietro Bracci; and the chapel of the Concezione in Sant'Ambrogio e Carlo al Corso.

Posi also held the post of architect to the apostolic palaces and to St Peter's Basilica, where he designed the monument to Maria Clementina Sobieska, also carved by Bracci. During the 1750s and 1760s he designed the Presentation of the Chinea, an important annual tribute from the Colonna family to the Pope, celebrated with fireworks. In 1764 Posi was made a Knight of the Golden Spur. In 1766 he helped with the ephemeral obsequies held in Santi Apostoli in Rome, after the death of James Francis Edward Stuart, the pretender to the crown of England.

=== In Florence ===
By 1740 Posi seemed to have established a reputation outside Rome as well; he was called to Florence by Anna Maria Luisa de' Medici, Electress Palatine, to design the façade of the basilican church of San Lorenzo (begun 1418 by Filippo Brunelleschi). Posi’s design of 1741 (unexecuted; Florence, National Central Library) repeated the Roman Mannerist composition of a planar two-storey façade with a central pediment, although the horizontal emphasis and the modelling of the façade are related to the new classicism in Rome; he may have been influenced by Ferdinando Fuga’s façade of Santa Maria dell’Orazione e Morte (1733–7), Rome. Posi was invited to renovate the apse of Naples Cathedral with Bracci in 1744 and worked in Siena on the addition of a bell tower (1765) to the Basilica of San Francesco.

He also renovated the German national church of Santa Maria dell'Anima (1500–23) in Rome, decorating the presbytery, apse and choir (1743–50). The exuberance of the decoration met with the disapproval of such contemporary critics as Francesco Milizia. The church of Santa Caterina da Siena (1766–73) in the Via Giulia, Rome, was Posi’s most important work. It was one of the last examples built in Rome of a flat, two-storey central bay between curving wings, a type probably based on Borromini’s Sant'Agnese in Agone. A model survives in the Arciconfraternita dei Senesi, Piazza della Quercia 27, Rome. Although the disposition of the orders is uncertain and the proportions odd, it fits comfortably within the street plane. The plan was based on the Church of the Gesù (begun 1568 by Giacomo Barozzi da Vignola), Rome, with arcaded side chapels between paired pilasters. The interior is unusually sober, for Posi abandoned the exuberant polychromy of his earlier work.

Posi was responsible for the controversial renovations to the interior of the Pantheon (1747; called Santa Maria ad Martyres). He removed the marble panelling from the attic and added aediculae to the niches, with intermediate blank panels, which transformed the proportions of the drum (one section has been restored to its original form). A later commission was for a villa (1759–62) near Padua, built to house the collection of antiquities formed by Filippo Farsetti. The style reveals the influence of North European Rococo.

Posi died in Rome in 1776. Among his pupils was the Italian architect Giacomo Quarenghi.

== Gallery ==
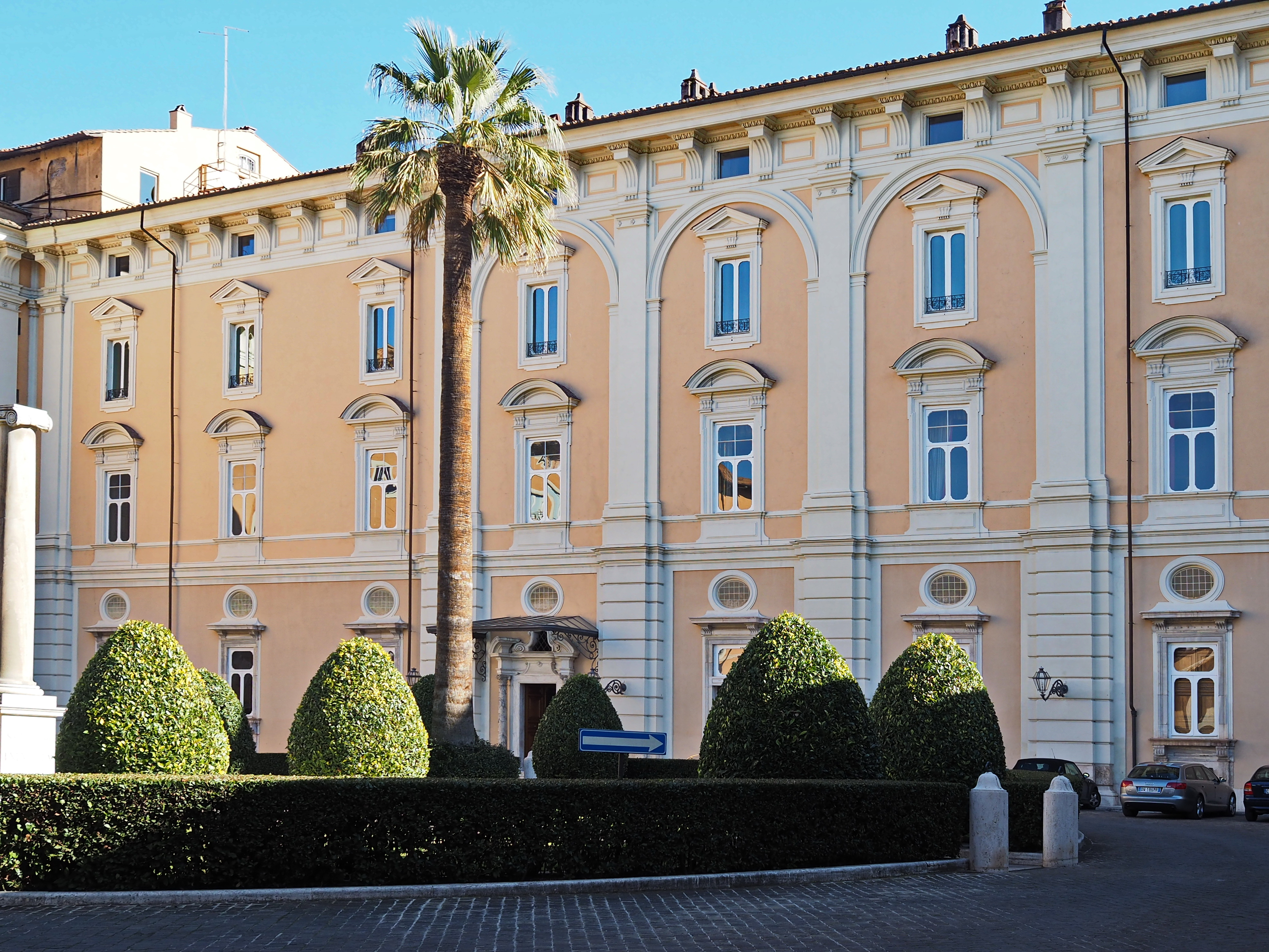
Courtyard façade of Palazzo Colonna, Rome

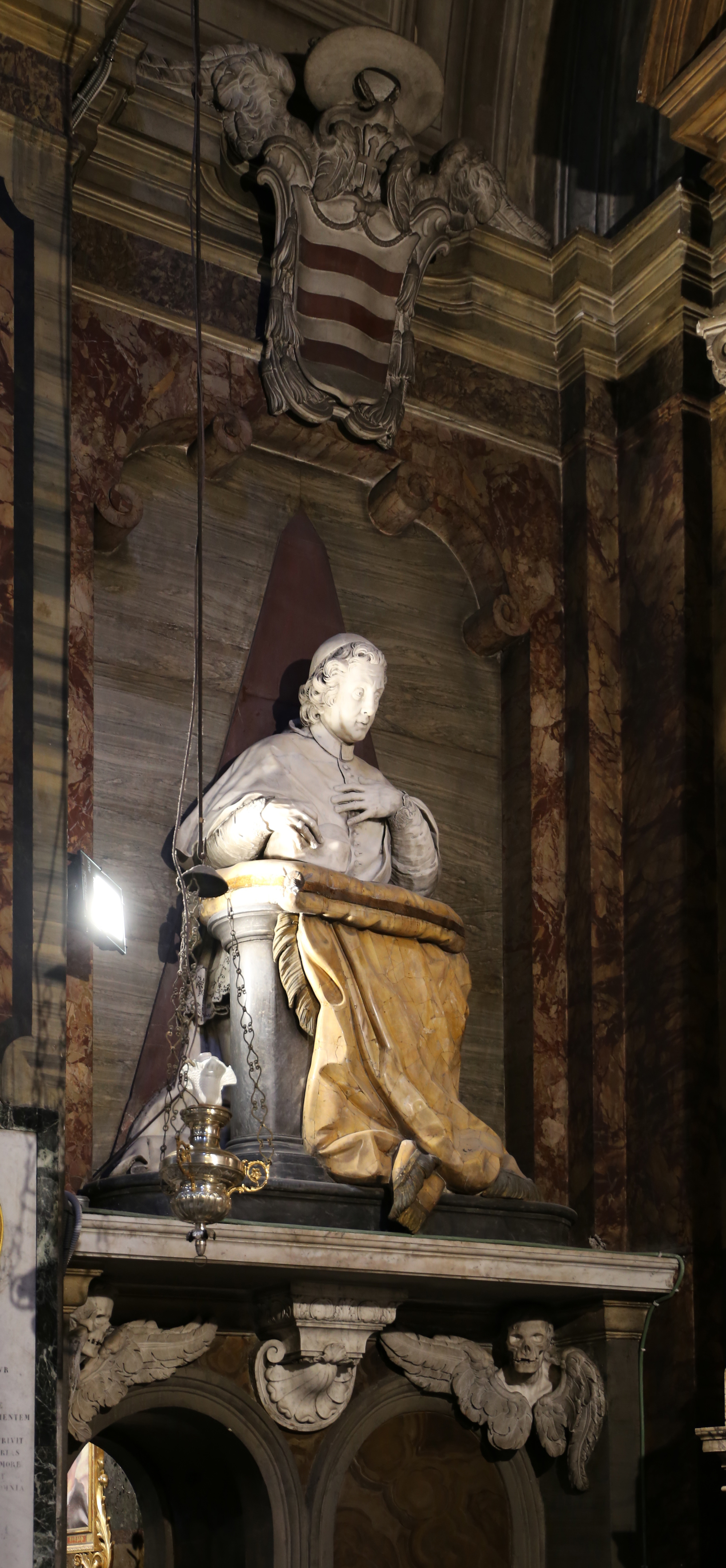
Monument to Cardinal Pier Luigi Carafa

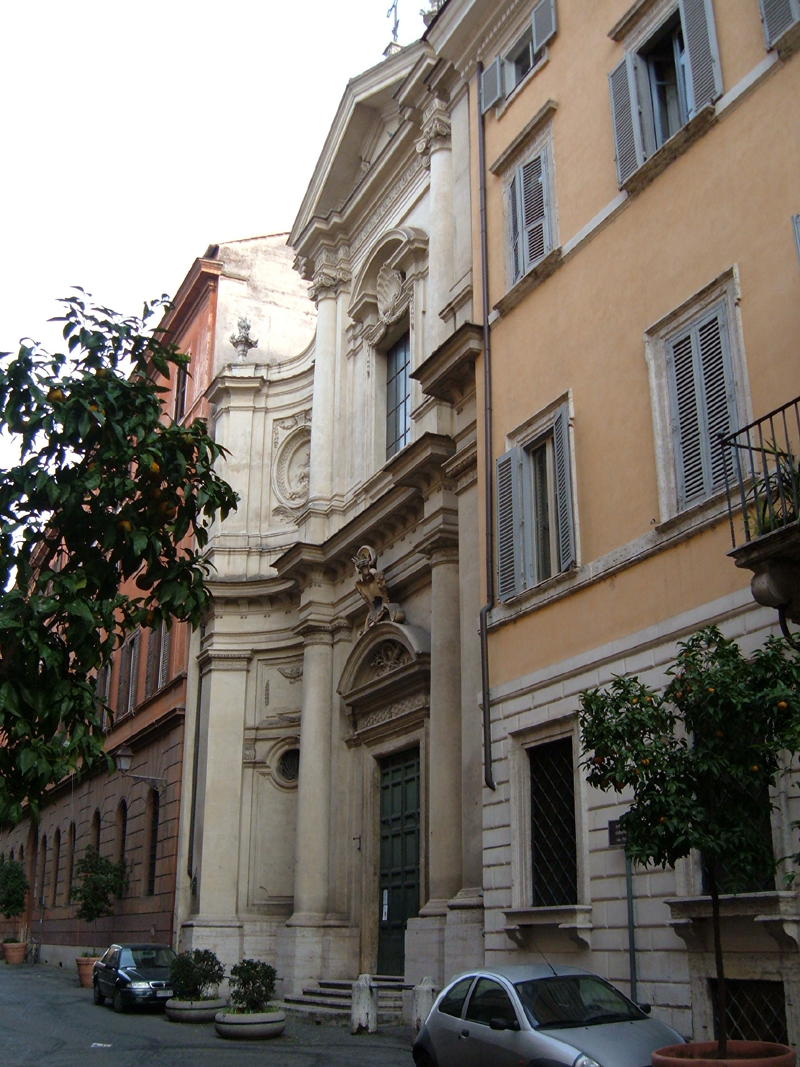
Santa Caterina da Siena, Rome

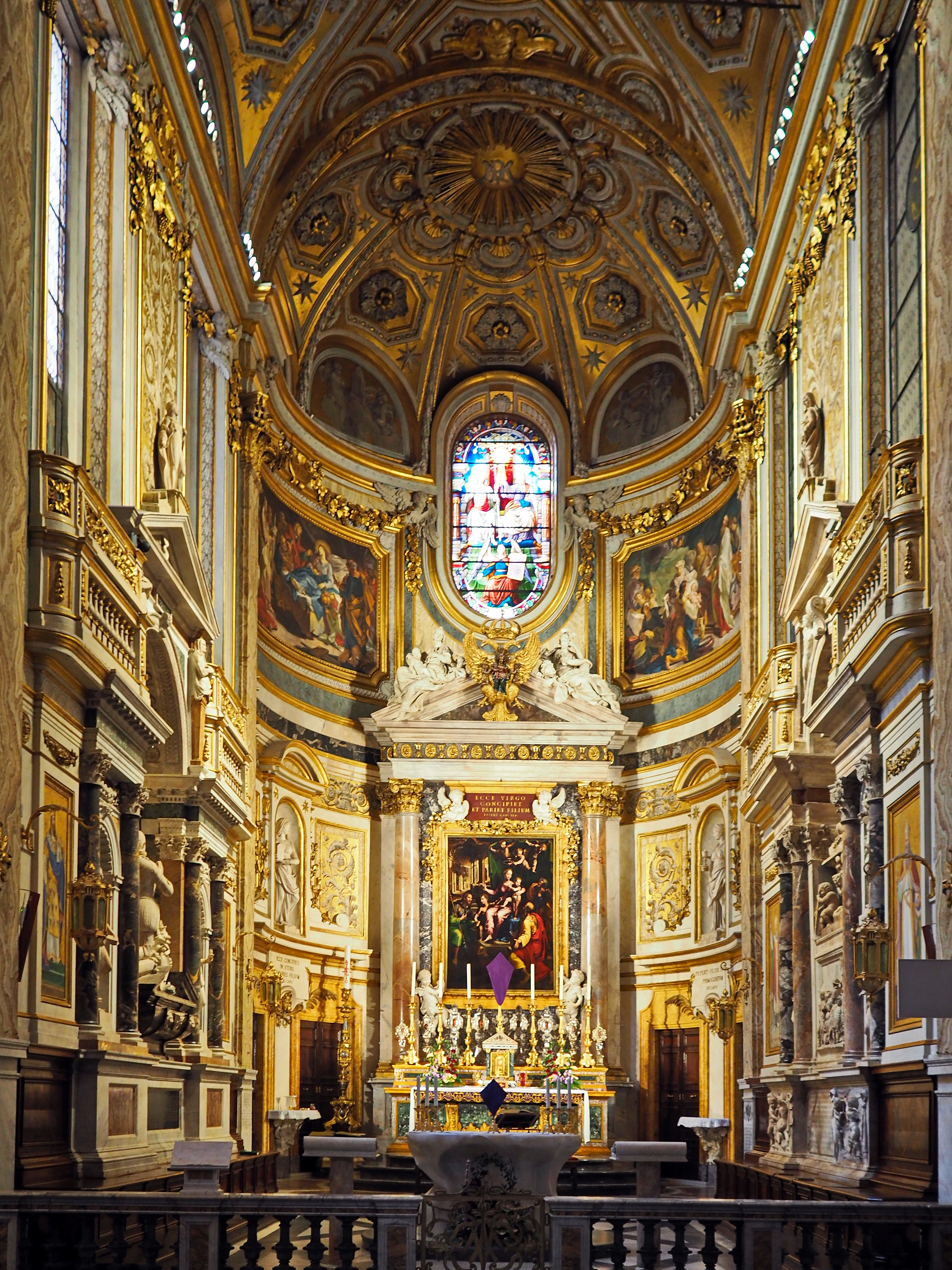
Interior of the church of Santa Maria dell'Anima

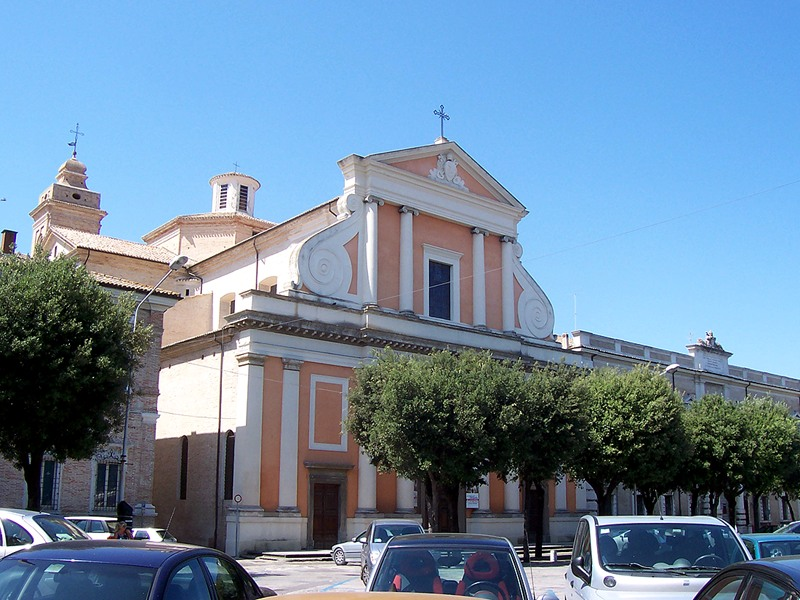
The Jesuit Church in Senigallia, designed by Posi

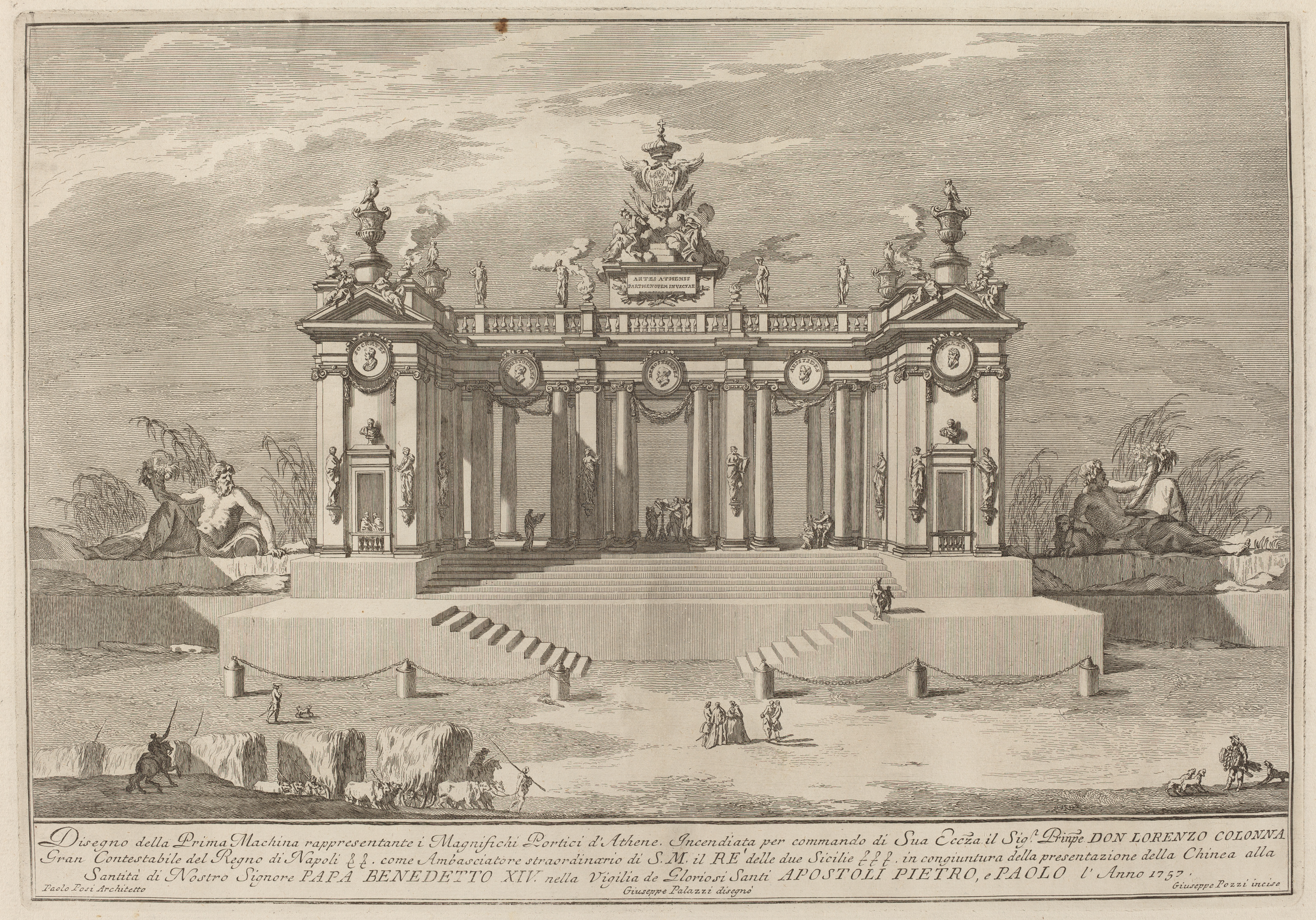
Giuseppe Pozzi after Giuseppe Palazzi (designer) and Paolo Posi (architect), The School of Athens Arcades, for the "Chinea" Festival, 1757

== Bibliography ==
- Milizia, Francesco (1826). Translated by Mrs. Edward Cresy (ed.). The lives of celebrated architects, ancient and modern. Vol. 1. J. Taylor Architectural Library, High Holborn, London. p. 354.
- Catini, Raffaella (2016). "POSI, Paolo". Dizionario Biografico degli Italiani (in Italian). Vol. 85: Ponzone–Quercia. Rome: Istituto dell'Enciclopedia Italiana. ISBN 978-88-12-00032-6.
