= Sant'Angelo Minore, Cagli =

Church building in Cagli, Italy

Coordinates: 43.5460°N 12.6486°E

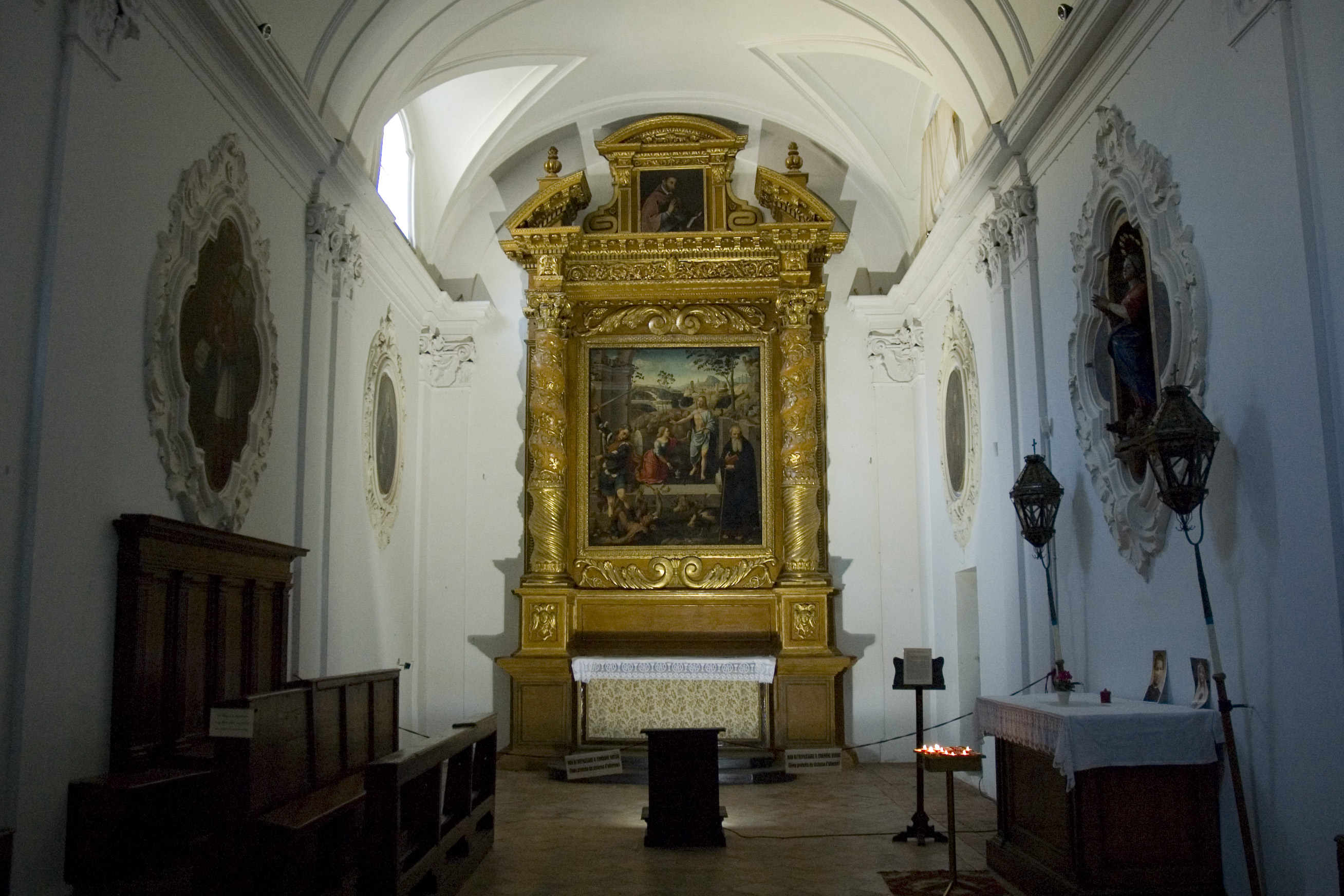
Église Saint Ange mineur de Cagli, autel

Sant'Angelo Minore is a Roman Catholic, Franciscan church in Cagli, province of Pesaro e Urbino, region of Marche, Italy.

== History ==
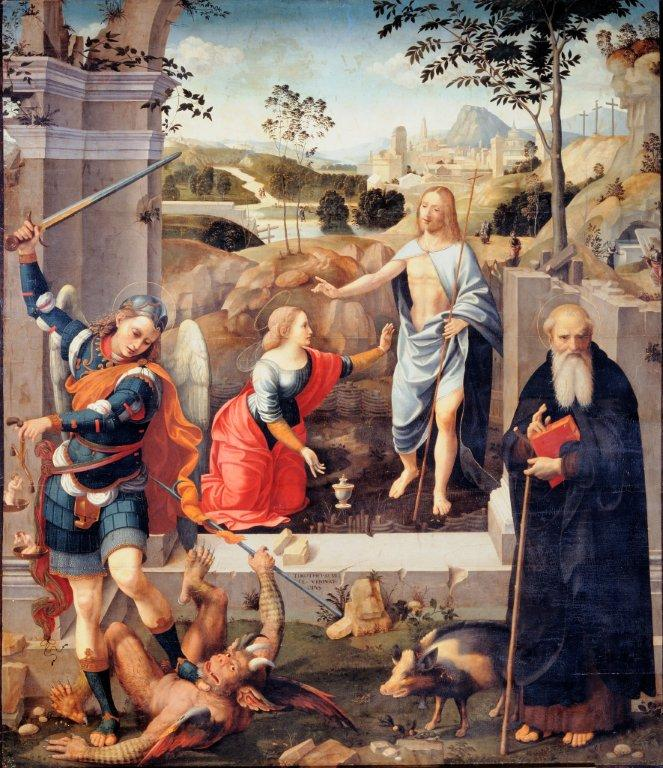
Noli me Tangere with St Michael Archangel trouncing Satan in foreground

The church and an adjoining hospice were erected in 1362 by the Confraternity of Sant'Angelo. The hospice was likely intended for the use of pilgrims traveling the Via Flaminia. The hospice which now houses the sacristy was renovated in the 16th century.

The façade has a loggia dating to around 1560, with four pietra serena sandstone columns in the Tuscan order. It was designed by the stonemason Giambattista Finale and replaced an earlier portico. The main front of the church was probably frescoed in medieval times, with the portico to protect it. The bell tower was rebuilt in 1617.

The interior has an altarpiece depicting Noli me tangere by Timoteo Viti.
