= Filippo Farsetti =

Italian art patron

Filippo Vincenzo Farsetti (Venice, 13 January 1703 - Venice, 22 September 1774), was an Italian art collector and patron of the arts.

== Early life ==
Filippo was the son of Anton Francesco Farsetti and his wife Marina Foscari. The Foscari were an ancient Venetian patrician family, which reached its peak in the 14th–15th centuries with the dogeship of Francesco Foscari (1423-1457). The Farsetti, on the other hand, originally came from Tuscany, though they had divided into numerous branches that established themselves throughout Northern Italy. Filippo's branch had become part of the patrician class of Venice as late in 1664, by payment of a hundred thousand ducats. Though relatively recent arrivals, therefore, they were very rich, and this meant for Filippo a comfortable and carefree childhood and youth. He spent his first years engrossed in his studies and far from political concerns. The tranquility of those years contributed doubtless to his decision to receive minor orders, which is why he is often referred to as the “abate” Farsetti, though he never became a priest. In this context “abate”, though literally the word means “abbot”, was used at the time in a way similar to the French “abbé” as an honorific title for any cleric of minor rank.

Farsetti spent much of his life travelling, visiting among other places Rome, Naples, Florence, and Paris. His interest was in establishing friendly relations with many men of culture. He was also a great patron of the arts and by his patronage contributed to the introduction into Venice of Neoclassicism.

== Collection at Ca' Farsetti ==
The art collection he formed in his residence on the Grand Canal, Ca' Farsetti, was famous and became a sort of museum that was open to the curious, to artists, to his fellow citizens and to foreign tourists, and its visitors included Johann Wolfgang von Goethe. The collection is known to have included 253 plaster casts of classical and modern sculptures (mostly by Ventura Furlani), various copies in oils by Luigi Pozzi of works executed in Rome by Raphael and by Annibale Carracci. There were also models by Antonio Chichi in cork and pumice stone of the best known monuments of ancient Rome, along with works in terracotta, bronze and ancient marble, as also landscapes by Flemish artists like Rembrandt, Peter Paul Rubens and Anthony van Dyck) and by other famous masters of the sixteenth and seventeenth centuries, including Titian, Antonio da Correggio, Salvator Rosa, Guercino, Tintoretto, Andrea del Sarto, Alessandro Magnasco, Pietro da Cortona, Padovanino, Giorgione, Luca Giordano, Palma Giovane and several of Farsetti's contemporaries, like Luca Carlevarijs, Sebastiano Ricci and Francesco Zuccarelli.

As to the works in terracotta, it is known that there were several terracottas by Stefano Maderno, and several of Maderno's terracotta sketches, which are now in the Hermitage Museum in St Petersburg, where they arrived after Tsar Paul I of Russia began acquiring Farsetti's collection in 1800, the transfer being completed in 1805 by Tsar Alexander I .

Among younger artists who frequented the collection were Antonio Canova, whose first sculptures were commissioned by Farsetti, who also patronized on a regular footing Francesco Algarotti. Farsetti also financed Alberto Fortis’s famous journey through Dalmatia.

== Villa Farsetti at Santa Maria di Sala ==
Great admiration was also aroused by Farsetti’s villa at Santa Maria di Sala, created by transforming an existing property inherited from his uncle Anton Francesco Farsetti. Designed by Paolo Posi, Villa Farsetti distanced itself from the typical Venetian models to resemble in some regards Austrian tastes and anticipating neoclassical features. The entire complex included a reconstruction of Roman monuments of the Capitol, the Temple of Diana and that of Capitoline Jupiter, and also an enormous park decorated with statues, vases and artificial ruins. Of all the features, the most prominent was a botanical garden created with the advice of Louis Clérisson, full of rare and exotic plants. In fact, Farsetti himself was no mean botanist and was responsible, among other things, for introducing the magnolia into Italy.

== Last years ==
Farsetti’s life did not end happily, since his lavish expenditure lead to financial difficulties and he was forced to sell many of his possessions. Moreover, a stroke left him mentally severely incapacitated. He had made a distant cousin, Daniele Filippo Farsetti, his heir.

== Bibliography ==
Paolo Preto, “Filippo Vincenzo Farsetti”, in Dizionario bibliografico degli Italiani, vol. 45, 1995.

Notizie della famiglia Farsetti, [no date], p. 65.

Giovanni Antonio Moschini, Della letteratura veneziana del secolo XVIII fino a' nostri giorni, Stamperia Palese, Venezia, vol. 2, 1806, pp. 113–115.

Juergen Schulz, The New Palaces of Medieval Venice, Pennsylvania State University Press, 2004.
