= Gaetano Lapis =

Italian painter (1706–1773)

Gaetano Lapis (1706–1773) was an Italian painter of the late-Baroque period.

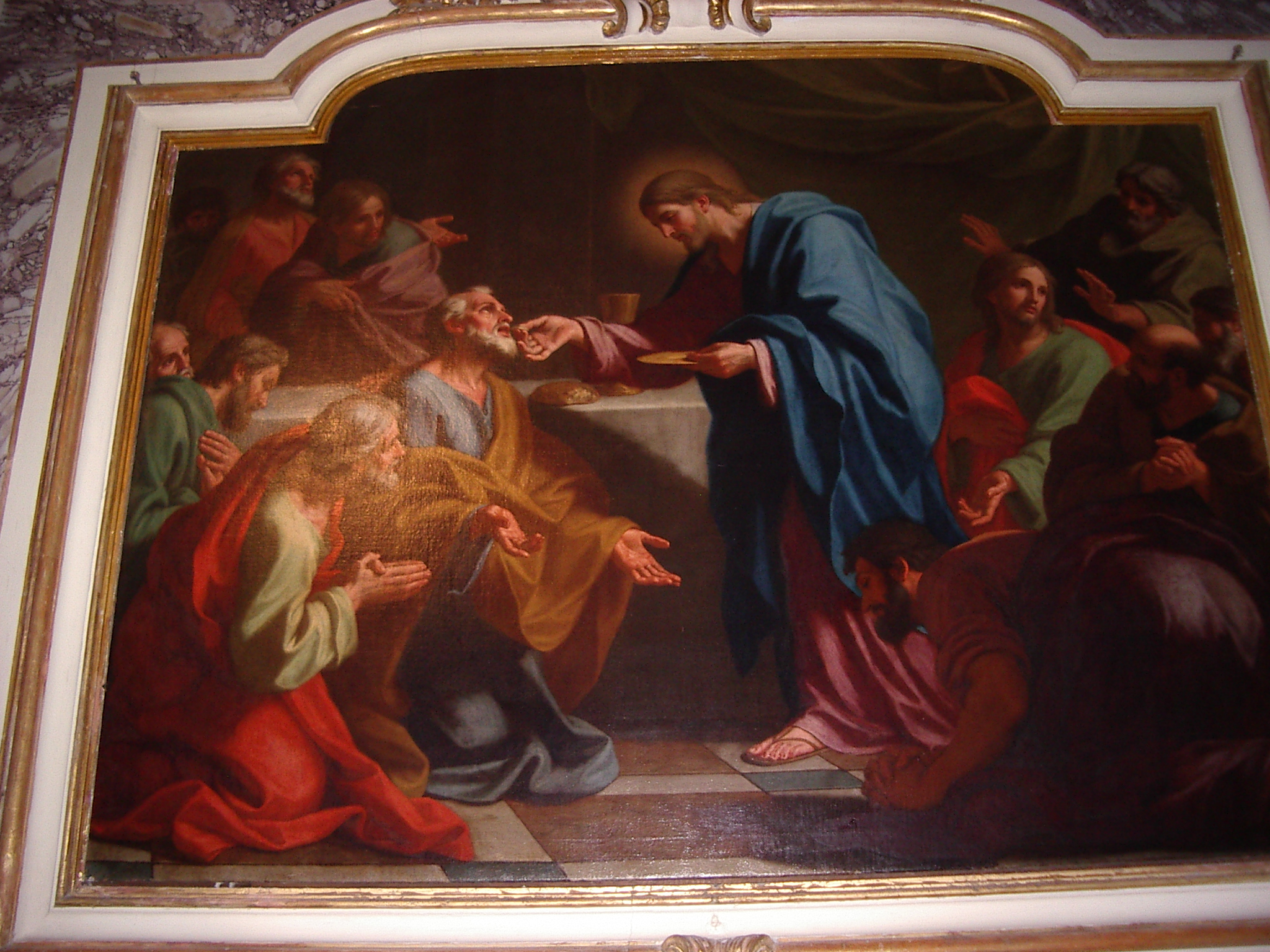
Communion of the Apostles in the Cagli Cathedral

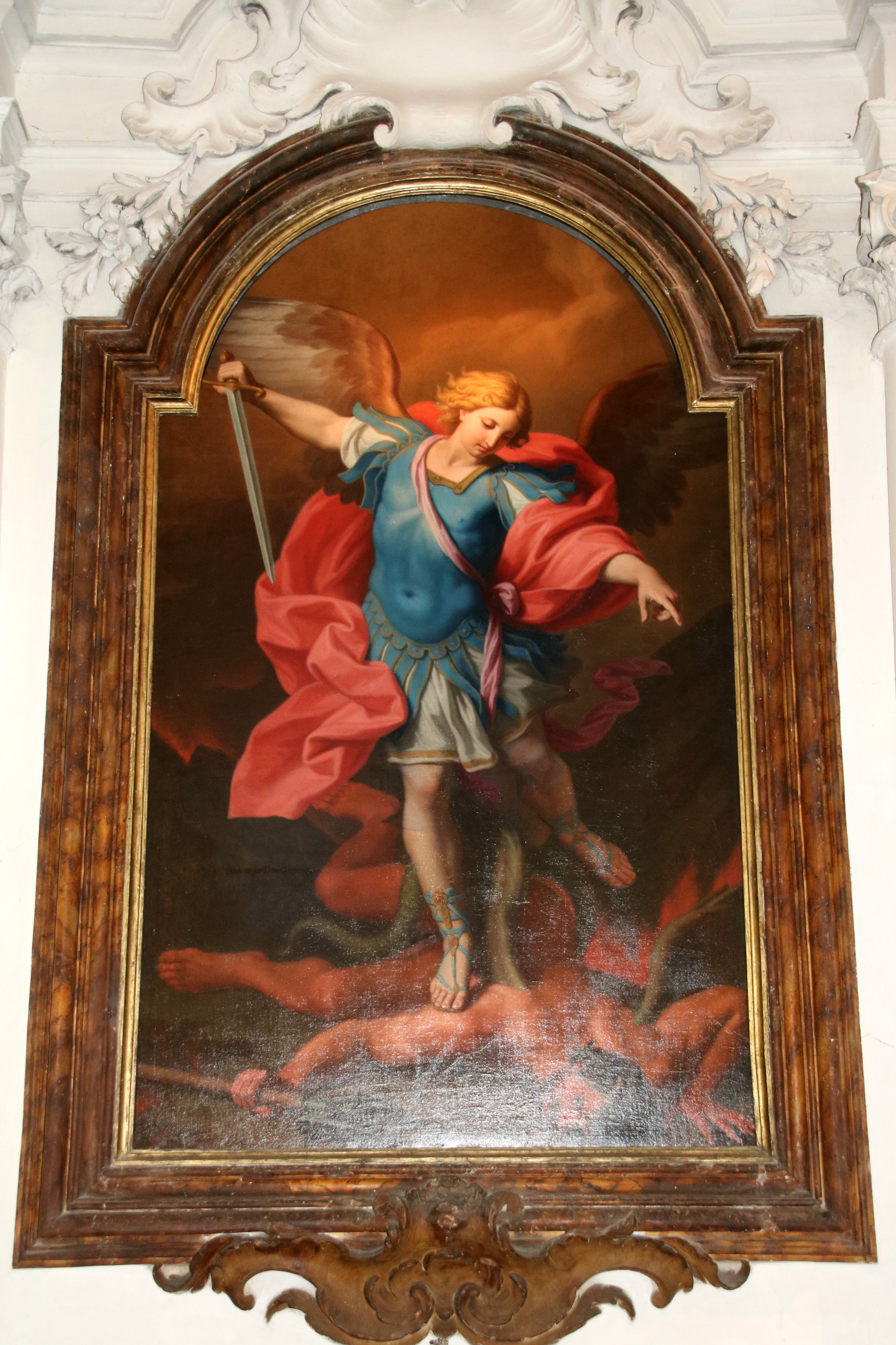
St Michael Archange in San Giuseppe, Cagli

== Biography ==
Lapis was born on 13 August 1706 in the central Italian city of Cagli, the son of Filippo Lapis, a wool merchant, and his wife Olimpia Orlandini of Cantiano.

He moved to Rome at a young age and, after a brief apprenticeship with Cristoforo Creo, entered the workshop of Sebastiano Conca, whom he may have met in 1720 when Conca was working on his Madonna and Child with Saint Teresa in Cagli Cathedral. Lapis later moved to the workshop of Conca's cousin Giovanni Conca.

In his 1787 biography of Lapis, Giovanni Gherardo De Rossi records that Sebastiano Conca "was fond of his new pupil and taught him with devotion even though he saw he was adopting a style totally different from the one he adhered to". During his time in Conca's workshop he was given the nickname Il Carraccetto, a reference to the influence of Bolognese masters of the previous century such as Carracci, Guido Reni and Domenichino.

Lapis became a member of the Academy of the Virtuosi in 1739, and in 1741 he was introduced by Sebastiano Conca as a member of the Accademia di San Luca. By 1754, he was living permanently in Rome. The list of his pupils includes Antonio Cavallucci.

From 1766, he was commissioned by Cardinal Scipione Borghese (1734-1782) and his brother Marcantonio IV Borghese (1730-1780) to work on modernizing the church of Santa Caterina da Siena a Via Giulia and then of Palazzo Borghese in Rome.

A document in the archive of the Accademia di San Luca records the funeral expenses for the "late academician Gaetano Lapis", indicating that he died in April 1773.

== Works ==
=== ROME ===
- Church of Santi Celso e Giuliano - Saint Cornelius between Saints Artemia and Januaria (1737)
- Church of San Giovanni della Malva in Trastevere - Saint Camillus of Lellis Worships the Cross
- Church of Santa Caterina da Siena a Via Giulia - Mystical marriage of Saint Catherine (1768); Jesus shows his ribs to Saint Catherine (1769); Apparition of Jesus to Saint Catherine (1769)
- Church of Santi Luca e Martina - Mary Magdalene
- Church of the Santissima Trinità a Via Condotti - San Giovanni de Matha (1750)
- Santi Marcellino e Pietro ad Duas Lauros - Martyrdom of Saint Peter and Saint Marcellino (1751)
- Palazzo Borghese - Birth of Venus (1771-2)

=== Urbino ===
- Galleria Nazionale delle Marche Stories from Jerusalem Delivered - Baptism of Clorinda; Tancredi's Dream; Armida tries to kill Rinaldo; Armida entertains Rinaldo; Armida tries to kill herself (c.1730)

=== Cagli ===
- Cathedral - The Eternal Father; Gathering of Manna (1756); Communion of the Apostles (1756); Saint Andrew Avellino (1758)
- Church of San Francesco - Miracle of the Madonna of the Snow (1730)
- Church of San Giuseppe - Saint Michael Archangel (1764)
- Church of San Nicolò - Miracle of Saint Nicholas of Bari (1756); Allegories of the Splendour of Saint Nicholas of Bari (1759)
- Church of San Pietro - Annunciation and Archangel Gabriel: Virgin with Child and Saints Peter, Paul and Scholastico
- Church of San Filippo - Death of Saint Francis Saverio (1735); Ecstacy of Saint Philip Neri (1754)
- Church of Santa Chiara - Glory of Saint Clare; Saint Cecilia, Saint Agnes, Saint Ursula, Saint Apollonia, Saint Margaret; Pietà (1733)
- Church of San Domenico - Presentation in the Temple

=== Jesi ===
- Cathedral - Martyrdom of Saint Lawrence (1743)

=== Siena ===
- Palazzo Pubblico,The Battle of Ponte a Valiano, (1732-33)

=== Gubbio ===
- Church of Santa Lucia - Saint Lucy
- Church of the Madonna del Prato - Saint Francis of Paola

== Bibliography ==
- Arseni, Carlo, Immagine di Cagli, Calosci-Cortona, 1989
- De Rossi, Giovanni Gherardo, Vita di Gaetano Lapis pittore di Cagli, in Memorie per le Belle Arti, Anno III, 1787.
- Mazzacchera, Alberto and Benedetta Montevecchi, Gaetano Lapis. I dipinti di Cagli, Urbania, 1994.
- Mazzacchera, Alberto, Il forestiere in Cagli. Palazzi, chiese e pitture di una antica città e terre tra Catria e Nerone, Urbania, 1997.
- Mazzacchera, Alberto, L'esordio profano di Gaetano Lapis, in "Atti e studi - Accademia Raffaello", XIV, 2015, 1/2, pp. 91-108.
- Michel, Olivier, Gaetano Lapis in casa sua: lettura di un inventario, in Gaetano Lapis e la cultura artistica nelle Marche a metà Settecento, Urbania, 2005.
- Rosini, Giovanni (1847). Storia della Pittura Italiana esposta coi Monumenti, (Epoca Quarta: Dal Carraci all'Appiani); Volume VII. Presso Niccolò Capurro, Pisa; Original from Oxford University digitized Jan 4, 2007. pp. 86.
- Zandri, Giuliana, Conferenza commemorativa in Onoranze a Gaetano Lapis nel II centenario della morte 1776-1976, Urbania, 1976.
