= Timoteo Viti =

Italian painter

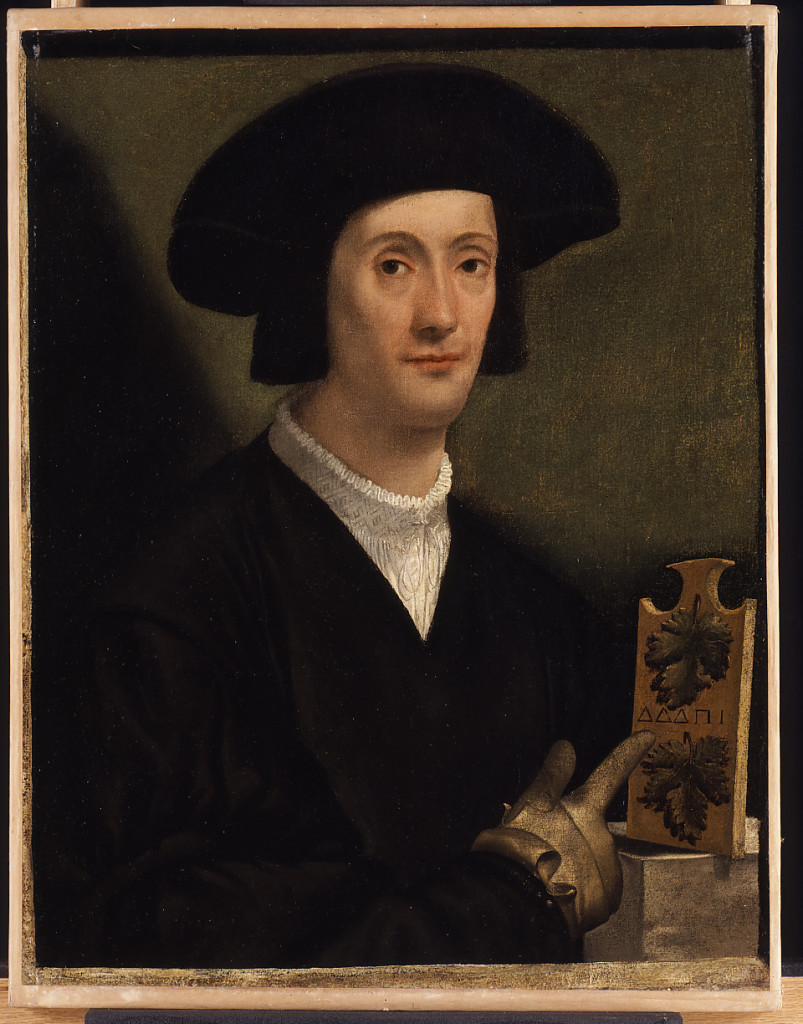
- self-portrait, 1509
- Born: 1469; Urbino
- Died: 1523 (aged 53–54); Urbino
- Occupation: Painter

St. Thomas Becket and St. Martin of Tours with Archbishop Giovanni Pietro Arrivabene

Timoteo Viti (Urbino, 1469 – 1523, Urbino), sometimes called Timoteo della Viti or Timoteo da Urbino, was an Italian Renaissance painter, who was closely associated with Raphael, who was fourteen years his junior.

== Career ==
Born in Urbino, Viti was the grandson of the painter Antonio Alberti; his father was also a painter. According to Vasari and Malvasia, Viti was apprenticed to Francesco Francia in Bologna between 1490 and 1495; aspects of Viti's style would seem to confirm an apprenticeship in Bologna. In 1495 he returned to Urbino and replaced Giovanni Santi, the recently deceased father of Raphael, as painter to the small but brilliant court there. He completed paintings of the Muses in the Ducal Palace that Santi had left unfinished.

The precocious Raphael, who was eleven at his father's death, continued to run his father's workshop with help from his family. It has often been speculated that Viti contributed to Raphael's training. In any case they remained friends, and Viti obtained or inherited the most important group of Raphael's studio drawings, which his descendants sold to Pierre Crozat in the 17th century. Drawings have often been disputed between the two artists in the past, and Viti has also been accused of forging some Raphael drawings (though it seems now accepted this was someone else).

In 1503 Viti was painting banners for Cesare Borgia, who had expelled Duke Guidobaldo da Montefeltro as lord of the city. Guidobaldo regained Urbino in 1504 and Viti, along with Girolamo Genga, was commissioned by Bishop Arrivabene to decorate the chapel of S Martino in the cathedral. He continued to work successfully in the Marches for the rest of the decade, and as far south as Siena, where he and Genga collaborated on paintings in the Palazzo Petrucci in about 1508.

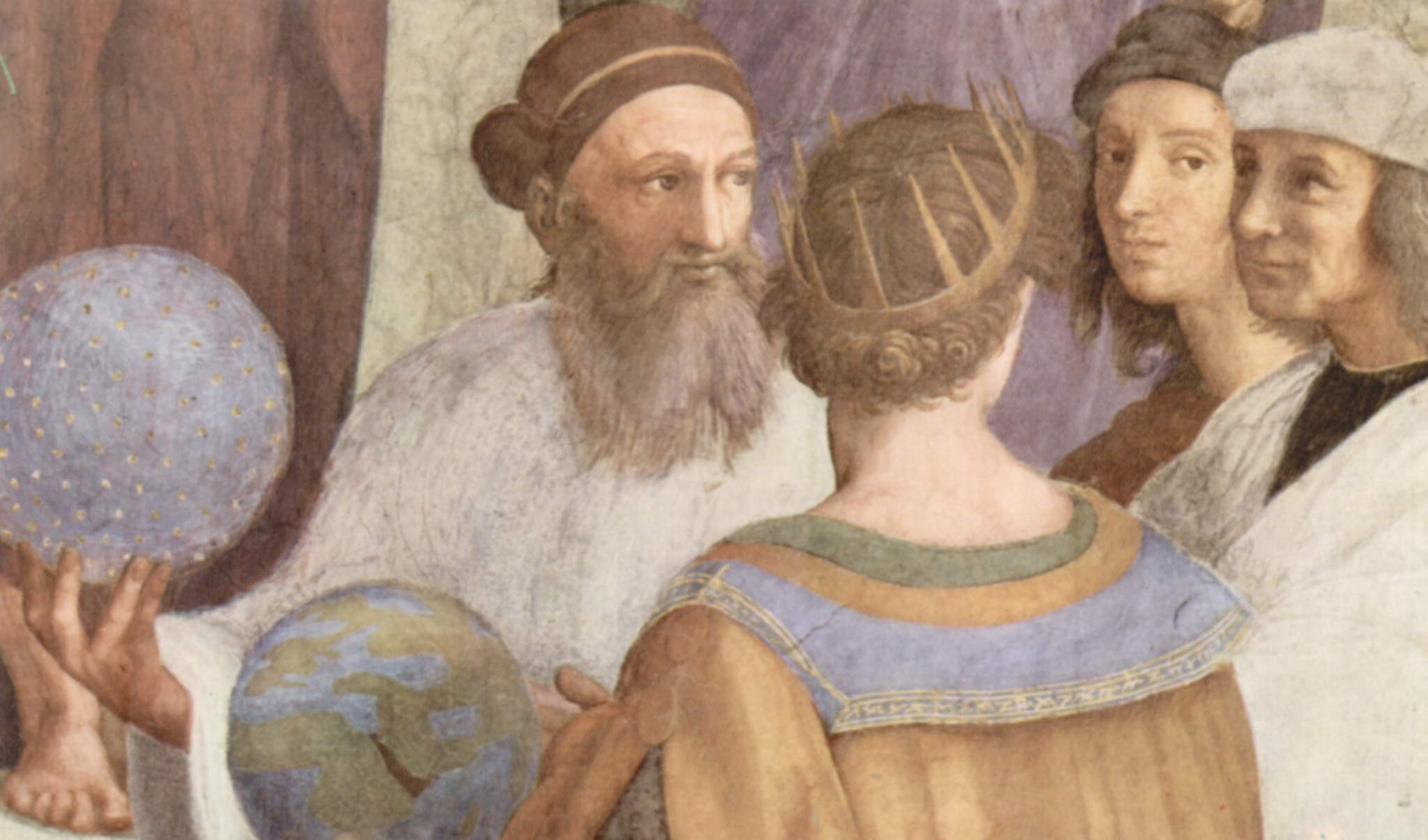
A possible portrait of Viti at the far right of this detail from Raphael's The School of Athens: Strabo or Zoroaster, Ptolemy, Raphael as Apelles and Perugino, Il Sodoma or Timoteo Viti as Protogenes

Around 1514, Viti formed part of the large team assembled by Raphael and worked on the frescoes Raphael designed in the Chigi Chapel in Santa Maria della Pace in Rome. It has been suggested that he is depicted (as the Ancient Greek painter Protogenes) in The School of Athens, Raphael's most famous work, standing next to Raphael's self-portrait, although Vasari does not mention this identification.

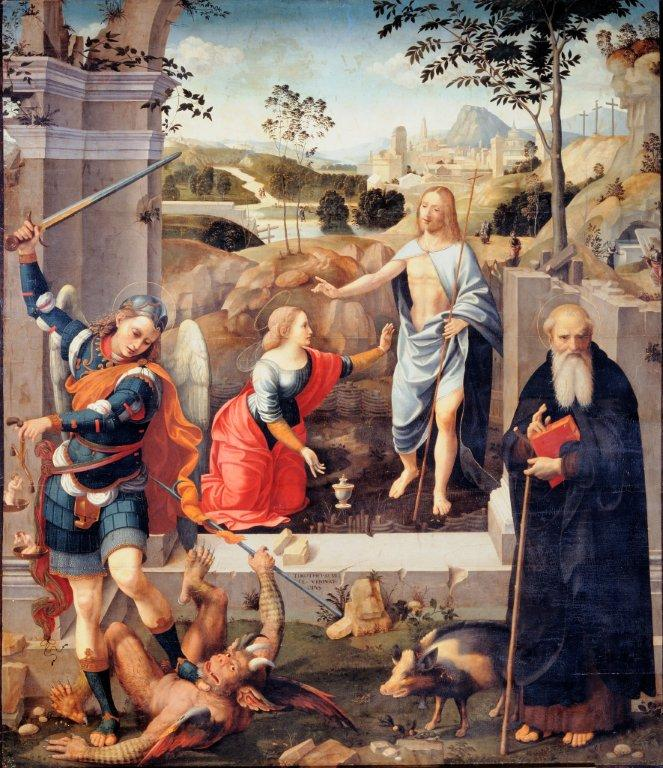
Altarpiece in Cagli

Raphael's mature style influenced him for a period afterwards, as can be seen in the large altarpiece depicting Noli me Tangere, and in the foreground the Archangel Michael defeating Satan and St Anthony Abbot (c. 1512) for the church of Sant'Angelo Minore in Cagli (Pesaro). In later works he rejected Raphael's influence and looked back to the art of the late 15th century. In his last paintings (such as the Mary Magdalene of 1521 in Gubbio Cathedral) his style became heavier, possibly as a result of the increasing intervention of pupils.

According to Vasari, Timoteo was an artist, a poet, and a musician. He was also politically active in Urbino. He served as magistrate in 1508 and chief magistrate in 1513.
