= Guido Palmeruccio =

Italian painter

Guido Palmeruccio, also called Guiduccio Palmerucci (active 1315–1349), was an Italian painter, active in Gubbio.

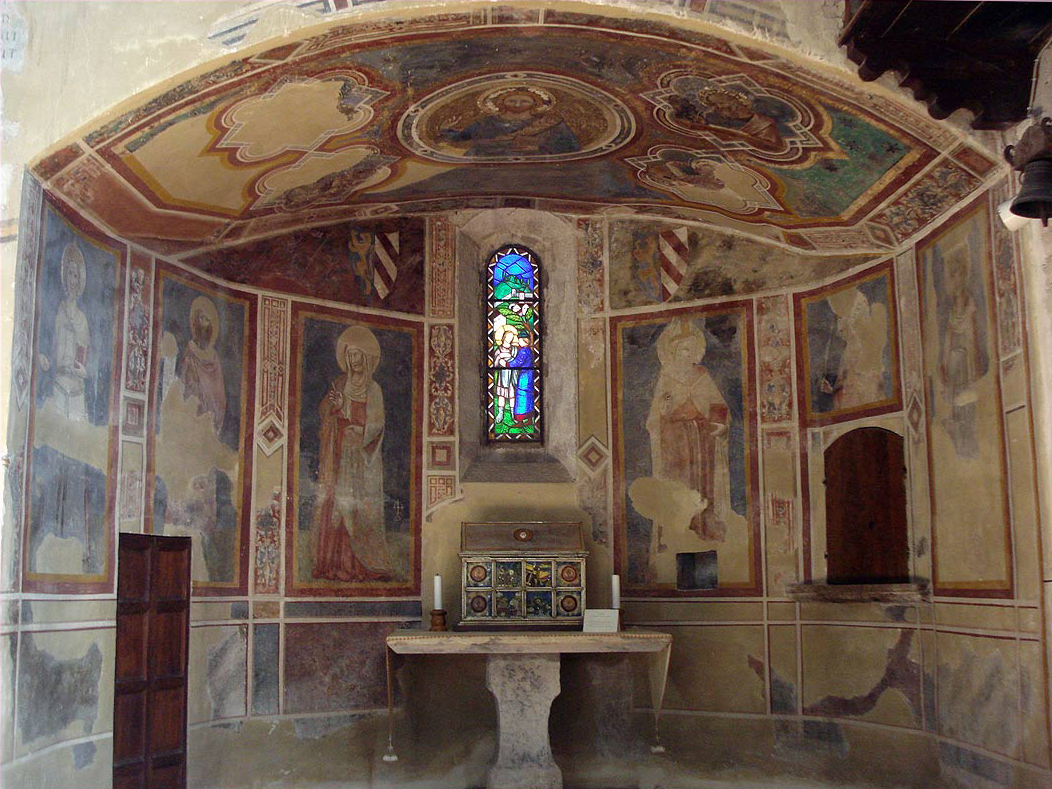
San Francesco

== Biography ==
Near nothing is known of his biography, and it is likely some of the works attributed to this painter belong to followers or contemporaries. One name brought up in this regard is Melli or Mello de Eugubio (Mello da Gubbio). Guido's style seems to show influence of Pietro Lorenzetti. The works attributed to him include frescoes in the church including a St Antony on the facade of Santa Maria de'Laici in Gubbio. he painted a Madonna and Child and Saints for the Palazzo de'Consoli in Gubbio.

An icon of a St Romuald was present in the collections of the Metropolitan Museum of Art.
