= Luigi Garzi =

Italian painter (1638–1721)

- Allegory of Faith: fresco by L. Garzi in the vault above the left aisle of Basilica Santi Ambrogio e Carlo al Corso
- Born: 28 June 1638; Pistoia, Grand Duchy of Tuscany
- Died: 2 April 1721 (aged 82); Rome, Papal States
- Known for: Painting

Luigi Garzi (28 June 1638 – 2 April 1721) was an Italian painter of the Baroque period whose style was strongly influenced by the work of the Bolognese painter Guido Reni.

== Biography ==
He was born in Pistoia. He started learning from a poorly known landscape painter, Salomon Boccali. At age 15, he moved to Rome, where he was one of the main pupils of Andrea Sacchi. He is also often referred to as Ludovico Garzi. In 1680 Garzi was appointed Regent of the Congregazione dei Virtuosi al Pantheon, the papal society of painters. Garzi joined Rome's guild of painters, The Accademia di San Luca, in 1670 and became a director in 1682.

He painted a Triumph of St Catherine & Saints for the church of Santa Caterina a Magnanapoli in Rome. He painted a St Silvestro shows Constantine portraits of Saints Peter and Paul for Santa Croce in Gerusalemme. In the early 1680s, he contributed to the frescoes on the vault of San Carlo al Corso, where his works included an Allegory of Faith. He also completed a fresco depicting the Glory of the Eternal Father (1686) for the dome of the Cybo Chapel in the church of Santa Maria del Popolo. He was one of the painters who contributed to the series of paintings depicting events from classical mythology displayed in the Palazzo Buonaccorsi in Macerata; his contribution is a Venus in the Forge of Vulcan. He also painted for San Silvestro in Capite and the Chiesa delle Santissima Stimmate di San Francesco. He contributed a canvas to the Cagli Cathedral.

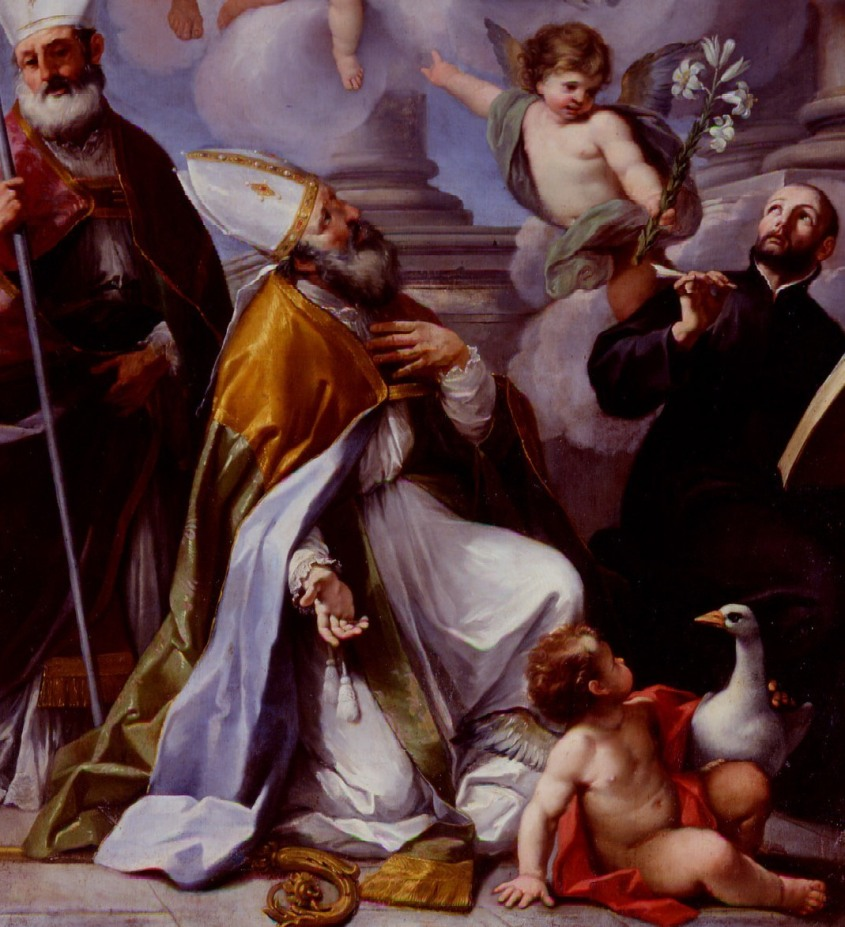
San Geronzio, patron of Cagli for the Cagli Cathedral

In Naples, he painted the ceiling and some chapels for Santa Caterina del Formello. He died in Rome.
