= Mello da Gubbio =

Italian painter

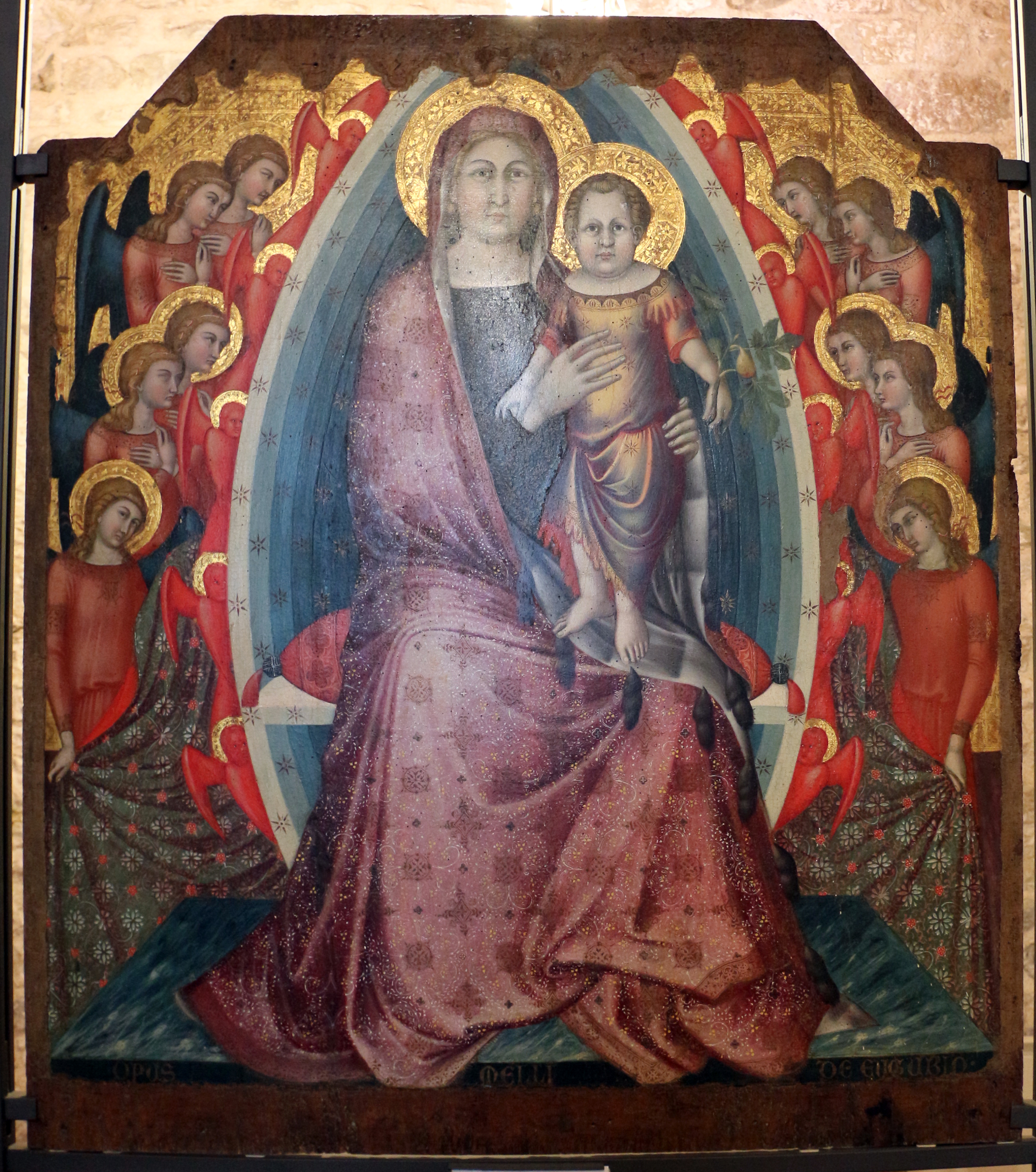
Madonna in Majesty

Mello da Gubbio, also called Mello de Eugubio or Nello da Gubbio, (active 1330– 1360), was an Italian painter, active in Gubbio.

== Biography ==
Little is known of his biography. He is described as a pupil of Guido Palmerucci, to whom some of his paintings had been attributed. One such painting was the Madonna in Glory with Angels, signed Opus Melli de Eugubio, now housed in the Museo Diocesano of Gubbio, but which came from the Pieve d’ Agnano outside Umbertide. There is another Madonna and Child with gilded background at the Pinacoteca of Gubbio.
