= Angelo Biancini =

Italian sculptor

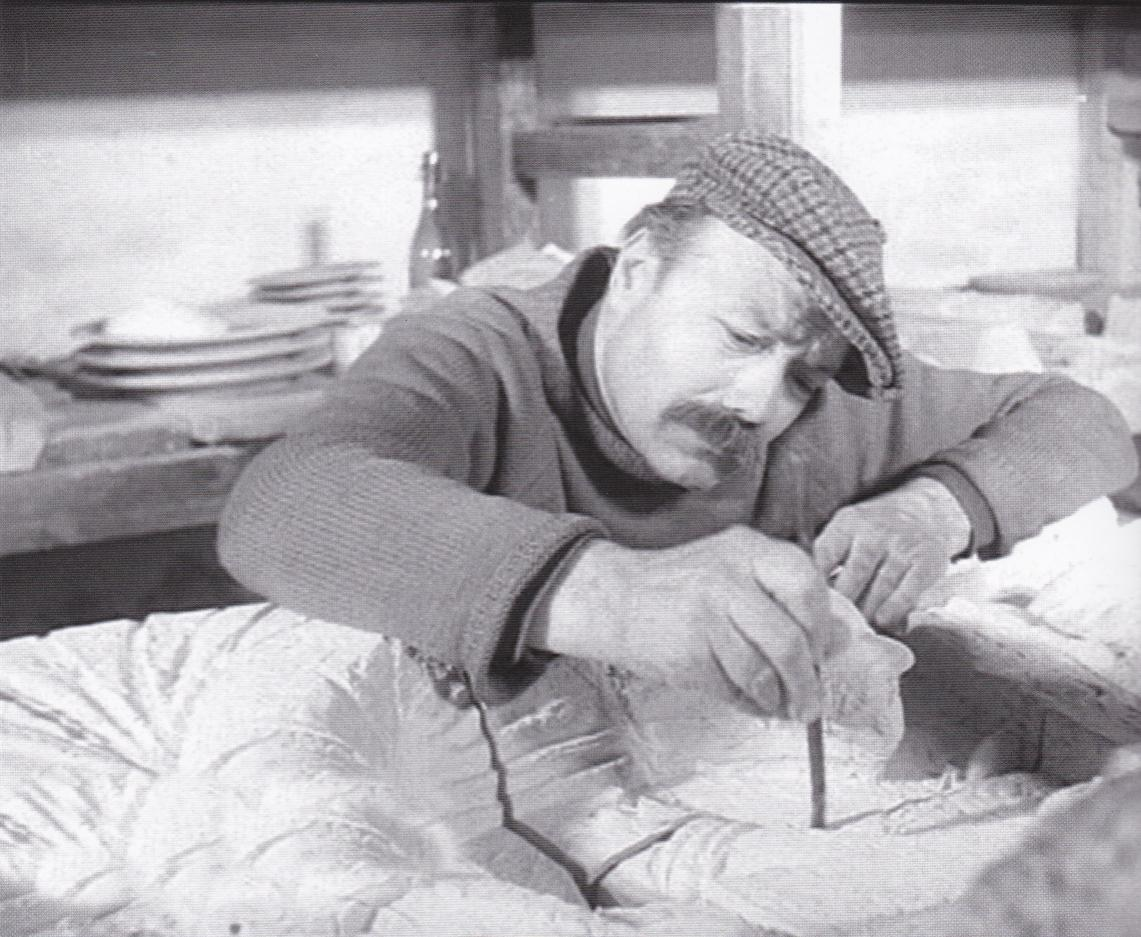
- Born: 1911; Castel Bolognese, Italy
- Died: 1988
- Occupation: Sculptor

Angelo Biancini (1911–1988) was an Italian sculptor. Room 10 of the Collection of Modern Religious Art, Vatican Museums is dedicated to Biancini.
