= Gubbio =

- Comune
- Città di Gubbio
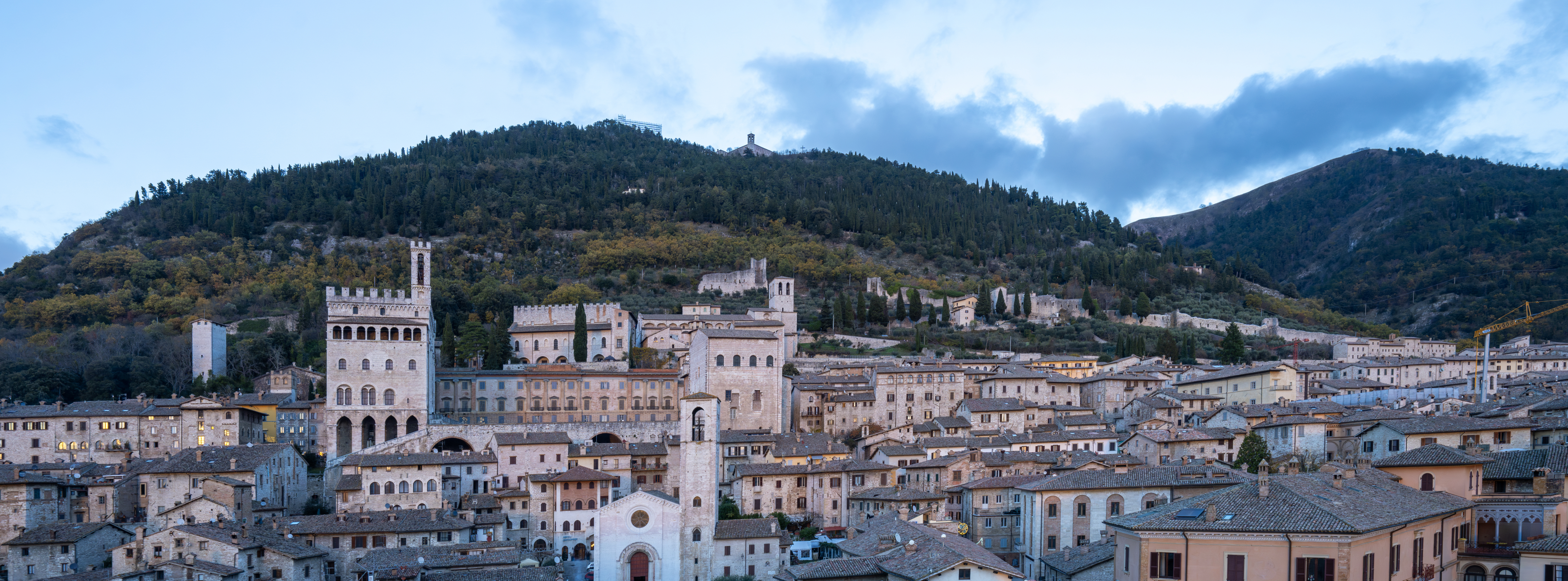
- Panorama of Gubbio

- Coat of arms

- Location of Gubbio in Italy Gubbio (Umbria)
- Coordinates: 43.353007°N 12.579288°E
- Country: Italy
- Region: Umbria
- Province: Perugia (PG)
- Frazioni: see list

Government
  - Mayor: Filippo Mario Stirati (SEL)

Area
  - Total: 525.78 km^{2} (203.00 sq mi)
- Elevation: 522 m (1,713 ft)

Population (2025)
  - Total: 30,297
  - Density: 57.623/km^{2} (149.24/sq mi)
- Demonym: Eugubini
- Time zone: UTC+1 (CET)
  - Summer (DST): UTC+2 (CEST)
- Postal code: 06024, 06020
- Dialing code: 075
- Patron saint: St. Ubaldus
- Saint day: 16 May
- Website: Official website

Gubbio (Italian pronunciation: [ˈɡubbjo]) is a town and municipality (comune) in the northeastern part of the province of Perugia in the region of Umbria in Italy. As of 2025, with a population of 30,297, it is the 6th-largest municipality in Umbria.

It is located on the lowest slope of Monte Ingino, a small mountain of the Apennines.

== Name ==
The ancient city of Gubbio bore the name Iguvium in the Roman period. Coins from the Umbrian period carry legends such as Ikvvini and Ikvvins, which correspond to the name of the inhabitants and confirm the identification with the town. These forms demonstrate continuity between the Umbrian and Roman phases of the city's history.

In later centuries, the name underwent various corruptions, appearing as Egubium and Eugubium, while the modern name Gubbio represents a further development of these earlier forms. Passages in Caesar and Cicero have been interpreted as containing references to Iguvium, though sometimes in corrupted forms.

The evolution of the city's name is reflected in documentary evidence, where forms such as Ugobbio, Iguvium, Eugubium, Egubio, Ugubio, Agobbio, and Gubbio appear over time.

The attribution of the name Julia Iguvia in the Roman period has also been examined, though this alone is not considered sufficient to support broader historical claims about the city's status or origins.

== History ==
=== Prehistory ===
The oldest evidence of human habitation in the Gubbio valley dates back to the Middle Palaeolithic, but only during the Neolithic period (6000–3000 BCE) does the earliest evidence of relatively permanent settlements emerge. Agriculture and animal husbandry were introduced to the valley around the 6th to 5th millennium BCE. Stone tools (made of local chert) and pottery have been found from this period. The styles and decorations of the pottery have a resemblance to contemporary finds from Marche and Lazio. At the excavated site of San Marco, east of Gubbio, archaeologists found a ditch with various almost-intact ceramic vessels, which may indicate a deliberate deposit as part of some sort of ritual.

Little evidence has been found from the Chalcolithic period (3500–2300 BCE) in the Gubbio valley.

==== Bronze Age ====
During the Middle to Late Bronze Age (1400–1200 BCE), there appears to have been a significant increase in population throughout the region. Beginning around 1400 BCE, there appears to have been a major shift in the settlement pattern in the Gubbio valley: from dispersed habitation of the valley below to the occupation of a single, strategically placed, upland site: Monte Ingino. This site, on a hilltop overlooking present-day Gubbio, was probably chosen because of its naturally defended position, good visibility of surrounding terrain, and access to surrounding pasture. The settlement at Monte Ingino was polyfocal, with people inhabiting sites on the slopes below the summit (such as Via dei Consoli and Vescovado), while the mountaintop itself, with its harsher climate, was only occupied seasonally, during spring. The valley below was under human use, as indicated by sporadic finds, but no actual settlement existed there.

The summit of Monte Ingino was the focus of ritual activity. A large amount of archaeological material has been found here, including some 30,000 pottery fragments and more than 25,000 animal bone fragments. These appear to have been part of some consumption ritual: a feast that served as a communal display to neighboring communities, who would have been able to see the smoke from the cooking fire; this ritual may have been performed by specific individuals while placed in this outpost above the territory over which they had to maintain control. Later, in the Archaic period, this ritual appears to have become much more formalized.

Later, around 1200–1100 BCE, another settlement area was established on the neighboring hilltop of Monte Asciano. This site served as a less prominent ritual center, and may have also been covered by a settlement, although only one hut has been excavated here. Occupation of Monte Asciano continued until about 950 BCE, when the local population all moved to the slopes below.

The Gubbio valley in the Bronze Age would have still been covered by a moist woodland environment which remained relatively cool and moist during the summer months. This period is probably the first time when people started cutting down significant parts of these woods to clear space for agriculture. Agricultural technology at the time was probably similar to that of Northern Europe during the Iron Age, with light wooden ards pulled by animals. Barley may have been cultivated on some of the gentler slopes near Monte Ingino and Monte Asciano. Pigs, whose bones make up a large portion of the bones found, could have been kept close to the settlements, where they would have readily consumed household food scraps, and then also taken to local woodlands, which would have been a great food source for them. Cows, whose bones are rather uncommon, may have also been kept; they could have been pastured in either naturally open areas or artificial clearings. Sheep and goats were most likely kept and grazed in the uplands around the settlements (sheep bones are also fairly common among the bone samples).

Woodland resources would have been abundant due to the more extensive forest cover. Red deer are attested from small amounts at Monte Ingino; roe deer are attested in small amounts at both Monte Ingino and Monte Asciano. Nuts and berries could have been foraged from the woodlands, as well as smaller game, and freshwater fish could be caught either in the perennial mountain stream between Monte Ingino and Monte Foce, or in the bigger streams (Saonda and Assino) down in the valley. Firewood would have been collected in these woodlands and brought back up to the sites in the hills, and flint would have been obtained from cobbles in the stream beds. Water supplies were probably derived either from the natural springs in the hills or from the seasonal streams between the hills.

==== Iron Age ====
Monte Asciano remained inhabited in the early Iron Age (1200–1000 BCE), and the sites of Vescovado and Sant'Agostino primarily date from this period as well.

=== Pre-Roman antiquity ===
By the Archaic period, the main area of settlement had shifted to the lower slopes of Monte Asciano, including Sant'Agostino. Monte Ascoli itself was used as a religious sanctuary during this period. Finds from this period include a drystone platform, dozens of bronze figurines dated to between the 5th and 3rd centuries BCE, and an aes rude probably dating from the 3rd century BCE.

As Ikuvium, it was an important town of the Umbri in pre-Roman times, made famous for the discovery there in 1444 of the Iguvine Tablets, a set of bronze tablets that together constitute the largest surviving text in the Umbrian language.

According to Dorica Manconi, pre-Roman Ikuvium was located in a well-defined area in the vicinity of the present-day city. It was bounded by the cemeteries (S. Benedetto, Via Eraclito, etc.), between the river Camignano, the continuation of Via dei Consoli, Viale Parruccini and the wall so-called del vallo, extending over about 34 hectares (84 acres) and surrounded by a huge area of land to be used for agriculture and stock-farming. This is supported by a high number of archaeological finds in the area, including a vernice nera kiln possibly from the 3rd or 2nd century BCE as well as a necropolis at San Biagio. A number of smaller rural settlements also existed throughout the valley, dependent on the main town; the two best-known archaeologically were at Mocaiana and Casa Regni.

Gubbio is one of only two Umbrian towns known to have minted its own coins before the Roman conquest (the other was Todi).

=== Roman period ===
As Iguvium became a Roman city, it was noted by classical authors. Silius Italicus referred to it as a place marked by heavy mists, while Cicero also mentioned it. Its earliest historical records date to the period preceding the Social War, during which it obtained Roman citizenship, its inhabitants being enrolled in the Clustumina tribe, and the city becoming a municipium. Strabo listed it among the cities of Umbria, and Pliny mentioned the Iguvini in connection with a herbaceous oil sold along the Via Flaminia.

Historical accounts indicate that the Iguvini were entrusted with the custody of King Gentius, captured by the Romans, which is taken as evidence of their loyalty to the Roman Republic.

During Caesar's civil war, both Pompey and Julius Caesar sought to secure the city. Pompey sent Termus, while Caesar sent Curio, to whom the city surrendered. Julius Caesar then honored it with the name Julia Iguvia. Augustus later visited the city when Roman soldiers, acting as arbiters in disputes between him and the wife of Mark Antony, chose Gubbio as a place to settle their claims. Augustus granted favors to the city, and the inhabitants celebrated his victory over Mark Antony in their theatre.

Originally, Gubbio held strategic importance as controlling a major highway through the mountains. However, when the Via Flaminia was constructed c. 223 BCE, it bypassed Gubbio by several miles to the east. This caused Gubbio to lose much of its significance, and it declined gradually throughout the Imperial period.

=== Early Middle Ages ===
Following the deposition of the last Western Roman emperor by Odoacer, Gubbio shared the fate of other Italian cities under the rule of the Heruli and subsequently the Ostrogoths. It was besieged by a general of Totila, then captured and destroyed. The city was later rebuilt with assistance provided by Narses.

During the Lombard invasion, Gubbio was not among the cities conquered by Alboin. Instead, it remained subject to the Exarchs of Ravenna and began to detach from Umbria, becoming part of the Pentapolis. For a time it was also included within the Duchy of Spoleto and possibly the Duchy of Perugia, but it remained largely under Byzantine authority together with the other cities of the Pentapolis until it definitively remained within the empire.

In 774, after Charlemagne destroyed the Lombard kingdom and donated the Exarchate and the two Pentapolises to the Pope, Gubbio became part of this donation, which later gave rise to enduring disputes. In the spring of the year 800, Charlemagne, returning from Rome, stopped in Gubbio for a day and placed the city under his protection.

In 917 Gubbio was largely destroyed by the Hungarians and was subsequently rebuilt on its present site by its inhabitants. Among those involved in this reconstruction was Pietro Pamphilj, son of Amanzio, whose family became powerful through land acquisitions and attained the title of count.

=== High Middle Ages ===
In the 11th century the city underwent a complete transformation into a free municipality, with the establishment of civic institutions. Although the exact moment is uncertain, there existed vicecomites or ordinary judges of the free citizens, who received investiture in the name of the emperor. Conflicts with feudal lords and bishops continued, but the population moved toward the establishment of republican councils.

In terms of vegetation and land use, data is largely not available until the early medieval period. In the 11th century, cultivation was limited to the land immediately around the city and around the curtis of the individual feudal castles. Toward the beginning of the 11th century, the combination of demographic growth and the declining control by feudal lords over their land led to a more favorable contract for peasants such as enfiteusi. As a result, woodland was cleared to make room for farmland, pastures were converted to farmland, and uncultivated areas were also put to more intensive agriculture. This agriculture included cereal crops, vines, olives, and fruit trees. Mixed cultivation, such as wheat interspersed with rows of vines, was introduced and especially well suited for hilly areas. Watermills had been introduced by this point (at least) and were an important part of the rural economy.

Little is known of Gubbio during the national struggle between Arduin and Henry II, but documents indicate that in 1037 it formed part of the empire of Conrad II, being included with Perugia and Todi in the March of Fermo. During this period factions of Guelphs and Ghibellines emerged. In 1065 Gubbio, allied with Perugia and Orvieto, fought its first municipal war against the Ghibelline cities of Todi, Foligno, and Amelia. In 1080 it joined Perugia in aiding Florence, then under siege by Henry IV, and in 1091, again allied with Perugia, Orvieto, and Spoleto, it waged war against imperial-aligned cities.

In 1096 Gubbio sent one thousand crusaders to the Holy Land, led by Girolamo Gabrielli, who was held in high esteem by Godfrey of Bouillon. His lieutenants included Matteo, count of Alfiolo, Pietro Panfili, Brunone of Vallapone, Rinaldo of Coccorano, and Ardego Bentivogli.

At the beginning of the 12th century the imperial faction appears to have prevailed in Gubbio. During the time of Giovanni da Gubbio, cardinal legate of Umbria, the municipal organization reached a definitive structure. In 1138 the city again declared for the emperor Conrad of Swabia.

Around this period, under the bishop Saint Ubald, Gubbio rose in strength and achieved notable victories against the forces of 11 allied cities that had besieged it. The causes of this invasion included the jealousy of neighboring municipalities and the rebellion of the counts of Fossato and Valmarcola, who incited Perugia, Spoleto, Fabriano, Assisi, Città di Castello, Cagli, Bettona, Urbino, and Sassoferrato against Gubbio.

In 1155 Frederick Barbarossa, angered by resistance encountered at Spoleto, was persuaded by exiled Eugubines and possibly by the same counts of Fossato and Valmarcola to march against Gubbio. Bishop Ubald and the consuls of the city met the emperor and conducted negotiations so effectively that he abandoned the siege and dismissed them with gifts. In 1163 Rainald, archbishop of Cologne, granted privileges to Gubbio in the name of Barbarossa in recognition of its loyalty to the imperial cause.

In 1113 Gubbio fought a war with Perugia, later forming an alliance with it. Its ancient privileges were confirmed by Henry VI in 1191. Pope Innocent II brought the city under his control, but it soon returned to imperial allegiance, and in 1211 Otto IV issued another diploma in its favor. In 1203 Gubbio appointed its first podestà, marking the beginning of its true communal ascendancy.

From 1235 to 1263 the city experienced a succession of conflicts. In 1263 Pope Urban IV strengthened the Guelph faction. Under Pope Clement IV, Gubbio freed itself from the jurisdiction of the Duchy of Spoleto and obtained its own papal vicar.

Gubbio experienced significant prosperity during the 12th and 13th centuries through commerce and the arts, particularly in the production of wool and coarse woolen cloth known as saie. Remains of large establishments built for these industries are still visible in the market square. The growth of economic activity contributed to a substantial increase in population. In the 12th and 13th centuries the population reached approximately 27,000.

Gubbio had to expand its city walls and construct new buildings to accommodate a growing population. This was accompanied by opening up more land for agriculture, especially in hilly areas, and even the upper hills. Documents from this period mention place names suggesting woodlands (Cerqueto, Monte Acera, Colle Cerrone, Cerquattino, Sterpeto) indicate the expansion of farmland during this period.

Dante Alighieri found refuge in Gubbio, where he was received by Bosone, in whose house he composed a large part of the Divine Comedy. This is commemorated by an inscription on the tower of the counts Falcucci.

=== Late Middle Ages ===
In the early 1300s, there was a major population increase; in addition to vines, olives, and fruit trees, new crops were introduced: flax and hemp. Landlords were now based in the city, and peasants had greater autonomy over the land; at the same time, the population growth meant that they had to expand cultivation into increasingly poor soil areas in order to support the larger urban population.

In 1310 exiled Ghibellines attacked the city, and Uguccione della Faggiola was elected podestà. The balance soon shifted with the arrival of Guelph forces led by the Orsini and supported by Perugia. The defeated Ghibellines were excluded from public offices, as reflected in the statute issued in 1338. Between 1332 and 1346 Gubbio rose in power and renown. During this period the great public palaces were constructed and the large aqueduct was completed. Allied with Florence, Siena, and Perugia, the city actively supported them in their wars.

The plague happened in 1348, killing almost half the population. Cultivation significantly decreased, and woodlands regrew. The rural economy shifted more toward animal husbandry, and farmland was turned into pasture. These trends continued into the early 1400s.

In 1350 Giovanni Gabrielli seized power in the name of the Ghibelline faction under the protection of Giovanni Visconti, archbishop and lord of Milan. Giacomo Gabrielli, leader of the Guelph faction, attempted to retake the city with support from Florence, Perugia, and Spoleto, but Giovanni, aided by the Visconti, the Montefeltro, and the Tarlati di Petramala, retained control until 1354. After the death of Visconti, Cardinal Gil Albornoz entered Umbria with a strong army to restore papal authority. In June 1354 Giovanni Gabrielli ceded Gubbio to the papal legate, and Albornoz restored all its privileges and jurisdictions.

In 1357 a certain Messer Brasca was appointed lord of Gubbio and Cantiano and rector of the Duchy of Spoleto, exercising tyrannical rule until his recall in 1368 by Pope Urban V. In 1376, under oppressive papal governance, the city rebelled and restored popular government, but it soon returned to papal control. In 1381 another uprising failed due to lack of provisions and the threat of siege, and in 1387 Gubbio submitted to Count Antonio da Montefeltro, who ruled until 1403.

He was succeeded by his son Guidantonio da Montefeltro, who repelled the forces of Braccio Fortebracci, allied with the Gabrielli faction. In 1420 Gubbio received Pope Martin V returning from Florence, and in 1433 Emperor Sigismund returning from Rome. Guidantonio died in 1443, leaving power to his son Oddantonio, who held it only a few months but received the ducal title. He was succeeded by Federico, a distinguished and capable duke, under whom the ducal palace was constructed.

In 1485 Guidobaldo I, son of Battista Sforza, succeeded to power. During his rule the Duchy of Urbino was attacked by Cesare Borgia. Gubbio, having risen in favor of Guidobaldo, was occupied by Galeotto Malatesta and compelled to receive Borgia, who installed his governor Vandino de Vandinis of Faenza. After the death of Pope Alexander VI in 1503 and the fall of the Borgia, Gubbio rose again in support of Guidobaldo, who regained control.

In the 1400s, there was a major economic revival of the city of Gubbio, and accordingly the demand for grain and other agricultural produce increased. Again, land was cleared for cultivation, and peasants were encouraged to do so by the Comune: at one point, peasants were given an extremely favorable contract: a peasant who cleared more than three mine in a single year was granted ownership of that land as well as its harvest. The Comune issued an edict in 1422 stipulating that all landowners must have their lands sown with good grain or face a large fine in the Camera Comunale. These indicate how strong the demand was for grain. Also, flax and hemp were cultivated, indicating the commercial demand from the city. By the end of the 1400s, so much land had been turned over to farmland that shepherds's complaints are recorded saying that they could no longer find suitable pastureland and had to take their flocks into the Marche.

=== Early Modern era ===
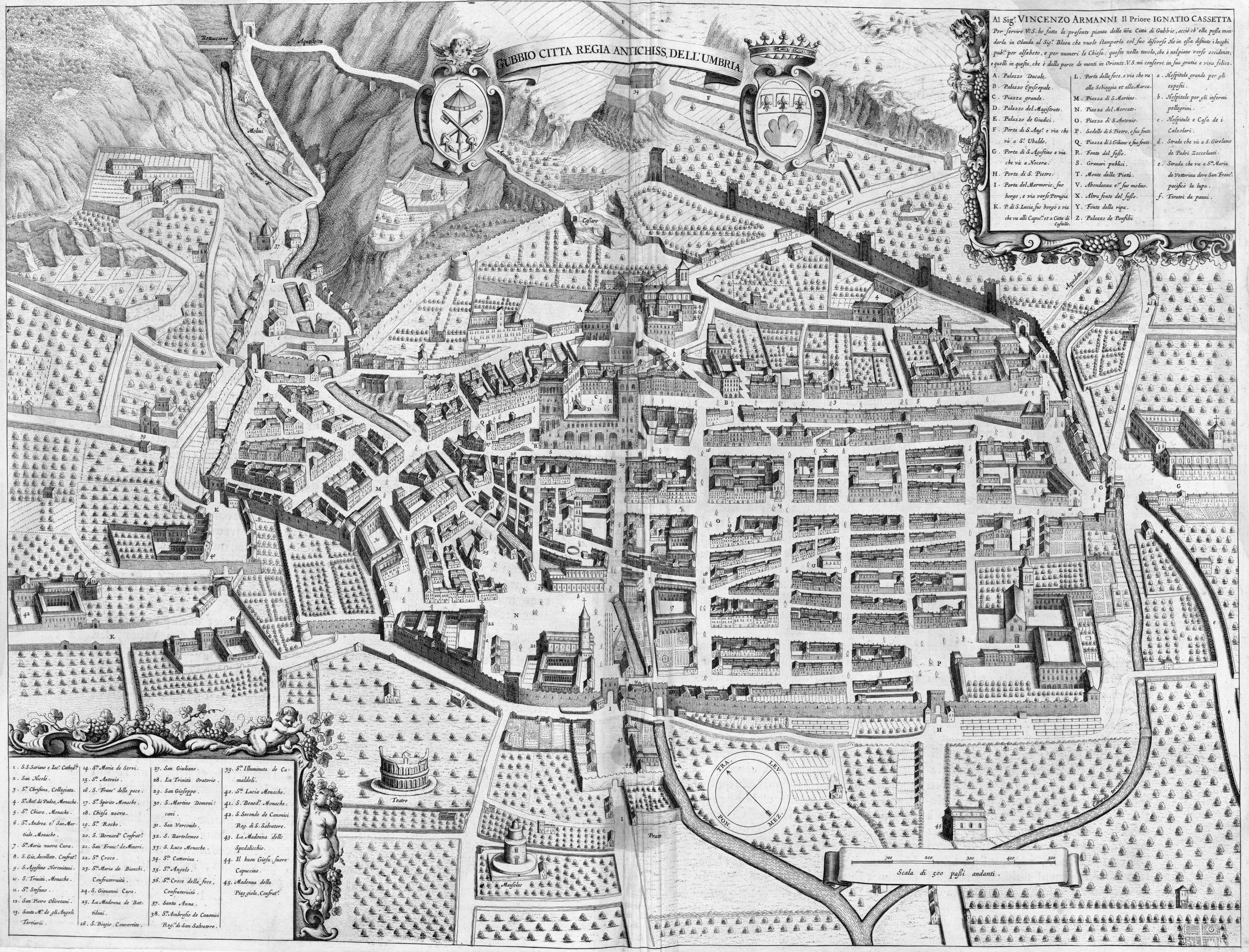
Gubbio in 1663, from Joan Blaeu's Theatrum civitatum et admirandorum Italiae

In 1506 Pope Julius II, on his campaign in Romagna, was received in Gubbio. Guidobaldo died in 1508 and was succeeded by his nephew Francesco Maria I. In 1515 Pope Leo X sought to deprive him of the duchy, appointing Lorenzo de' Medici as duke in 1516 and forcing Francesco Maria into exile in Mantua. Francesco Maria returned with a small army, entering the duchy from the Romagna side. Gubbio and Cagli supported him and fought vigorously, but he was ultimately forced to yield. After the death of Lorenzo de' Medici, Gubbio was incorporated into the Papal States and made capital of the duchy. Upon the death of Leo X, Francesco Maria recovered the duchy.

Guidobaldo II succeeded in 1538 and ruled until 1574. During this period the city successfully resisted forces sent by Pope Paul III, who sought to bring it under direct papal control. He was followed by Francesco Maria II, the last duke of Urbino, who in 1624, lacking heirs, ceded the entire duchy to the Church. The act was formally concluded in Rome on 30 April 1624, and Taddeo Barberini, nephew of Pope Urban VIII, took possession of the territories. Under direct Church control, Gubbio underwent a steady economic and political decline.

There was significant deforestation around the 16th century, both in the uplands and lowlands, and some of the steep slopes that today only support limited scrub and woodland cover may have had more significant forests before the 1500s, supported by thicker soils that have since been eroded away. Also, especially since the 16th century, ditches and levees have been constructed to control water flow, significantly altering the drainage patterns in the valley.

=== Contemporary period ===
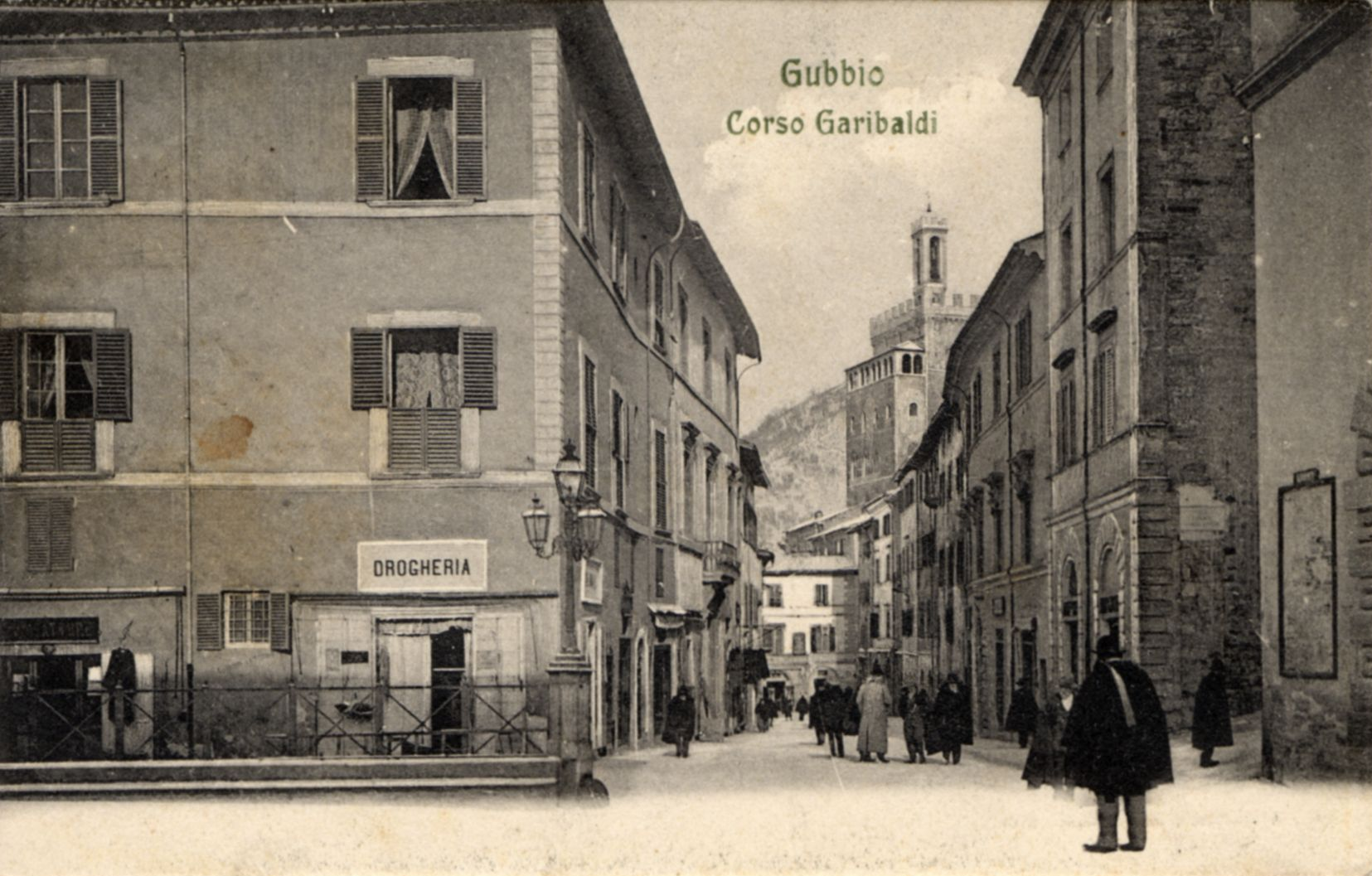
Corso Garibaldi, c. 1905

In 1798 Gubbio joined the Cisalpine Republic, and in 1798–1799 it joined the Roman Republic. From 1808 to 1814 it formed part of the Napoleonic Kingdom of Italy.

On 14 September 1860, Gubbio became part of the Kingdom of Italy.

In 1929 Coccorano and Giommici were detached from Gubbio and added to the municipality of Valfabbrica.

== Geography ==
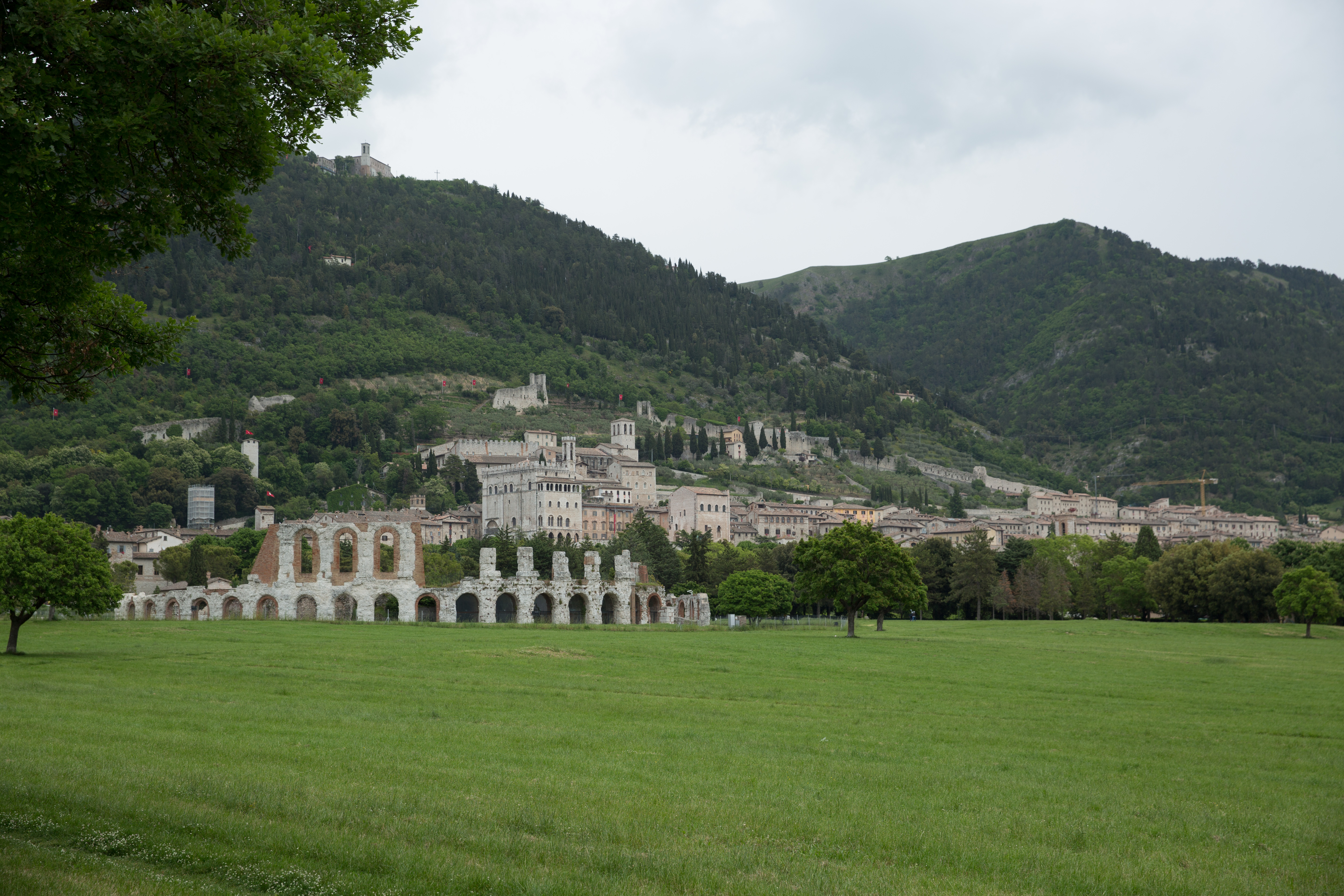
Panorama of Gubbio from Viale Parruccini

Gubbio is located in an upland valley in the Apennine Mountains, in the northeastern part of the present-day region of Umbria. This particular part of Umbria is a transitional area, close to both Marche to the east and Tuscany to the west. As a result, Gubbio has historically had strong political and cultural ties to both of those regions.

The Gubbio valley itself is arranged on a northwest-to-southeast axis. A steep limestone escarpment bounds the basin to the northeast. Unusually, streams flow through the Gubbio valley in two opposite directions, although both streams ultimately flow to the Tiber. These two streams are the Assino and the Chiascio. Two smaller streams, both called Saonda, run along the western side of the basin; one is a tributary of the Assino and the other is a tributary of the Chiascio. There is no clear watershed between the two Saondas, which may explain why they have the same name.

The city is traversed by the river Camignano, which nearly divides it in two, though the parts are connected by several bridges. Monte Cucco, located a few miles from Gubbio, contains notable caves.

The urban area is divided into four districts named after their respective churches: San Giuliano, San Martino, Sant'Andrea, and San Pietro. Each district has its own banner: San Giuliano bears a falcon, San Martino a crown, Sant'Andrea three ostrich feathers and two clubs, and San Pietro a rose.

The municipality borders Cagli (PU), Cantiano (PU), Costacciaro, Fossato di Vico, Gualdo Tadino, Perugia, Pietralunga, Scheggia e Pascelupo, Sigillo, Umbertide and Valfabbrica.

=== Geology ===
The Gubbio Basin is a graben filled with river and lake sediments. Drainage is to the northwest and southwest; the rest is mostly surrounded by "marly-arenaceous formations on the hills", while to the north is a steep escarpment. The surrounding mountains are primarily limestone and marl. Sediment runoff from the escarpment created several alluvial fans below it, resulting in the central part of the valley being higher. This is the reason behind the unusual opposite-flowing streams in the valley.

The origins lie during the Pleistocene, when tectonic activity simultaneously caused the basin to sink and the mountains to rise. There was once a lake in the basin. In the early Holocene, the lake disappeared and a stream system emerged.

=== Gola del Bottaccione ===
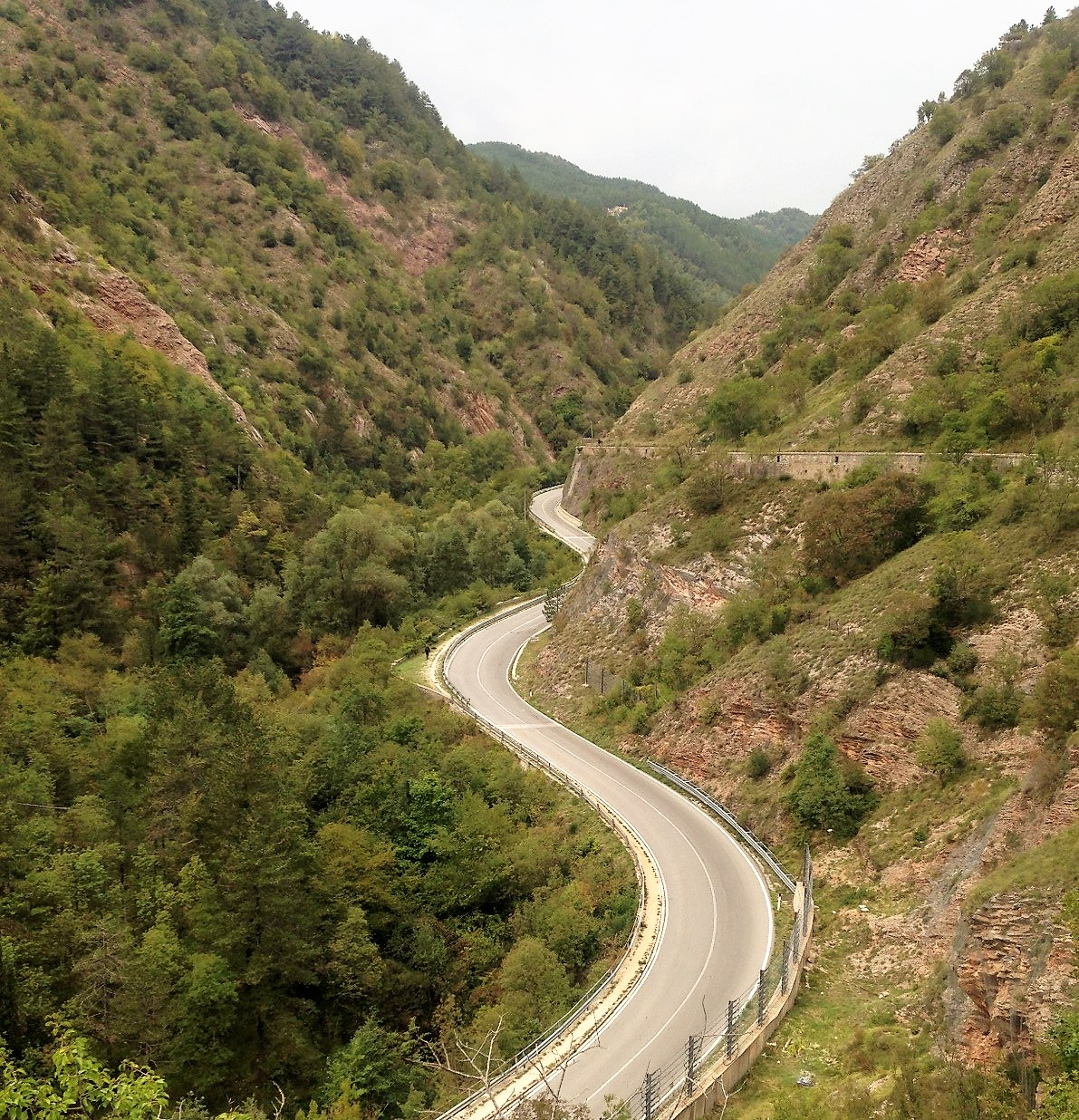
Gola del Bottaccione

The Gola del Bottaccione is a deep gorge with vertical walls between Monte Ingino and Monte Foce, also called Monte Calvo. Formed by the erosive action of the Camignano stream over the last two or three million years, it is a natural and scientific site as well as a place containing historic and artistic remains.

Its rocks form a complete, original and ordered stratigraphic sequence spanning part of the Jurassic, the whole Cretaceous and much of the Tertiary. Fossils found in these rocks made it possible to study the environmental conditions in which they formed. In the 1970s, the site became known internationally when an American geologist discovered a rock layer with a very high concentration of iridium. The gorge also contains the ancient medieval aqueduct and the Eremo di Sant'Ambrogio, founded in the 14th century.

=== Subdivisions ===
The municipality includes the localities of Belardello, Bellugello, Belvedere, Branca, Caibelli, Caimariotti, Camporeggiano, Canalecce, Carbonesca, Casacce, Casanova di Torre, Case Colle, Case Fontarcano, Case Mocaiana, Case Santa Maria Maddalena, Cima di San Benedetto Vecchio, Cipolleto, Colcelli, Colombara, Colpalombo, Convento Sant'Ubaldo, Corraduccio, Fontanelle, Fonte Cese, Fonte della Salsa, Gubbio, Lastreto, Le Trosciacce, Loreto Basso, Mocaiana, Monteleto, Murcie, Padule-San Marco, Palazzaccio, Ponte d'Assi, Raggioli, Ritirata, San Bartolomeo, San Cristoforo Basso, San Martino in Colle, Scritto, Semonte Castello, Semonte-Casamorcia, Spaccio Monteluiano, Spada, Stazione di Camporeggiano, Stazione di Padule, Torre Calzolari, Zangolo.

In 2021, 5,384 people lived in rural dispersed dwellings not assigned to any named locality. At the time, the most populous locality was Gubbio proper (14,150). The following localities had no recorded permanent residents: San Benedetto Vecchio.

== Economy ==
The surrounding territory is described as highly fertile, with particularly productive olive cultivation. The richness of the land and its agricultural output form a key element of the local economy.

A mint existed in Gubbio from ancient times, with coins struck by the Iguvini when the city was under Etruscan rule. The mint continued to operate under the Feltreschi and the Della Rovere families. It remained active under Urban VIII, was briefly suspended under Benedict XIV, and continued until the pontificate of Pius VII.

In the 1940s, cement production was important, with factories operated by the Società An Centrale Cementeria Italiana and the Società Anonima Marna, both manufacturing Portland cement. Traditional ceramic production was also supported.

== Transport ==
The city is served by Fossato di Vico–Gubbio railway station located in Fossato di Vico; until 1945 it also operated the Central Apennine railway (Ferrovia Appenino Centrale abbreviation FAC) with a narrow gauge which departed from Arezzo and reached as far as Fossato di Vico and in Gubbio had his own railway station located in via Beniamino Ubaldi 2, now completely demolished.

== Demographics ==
From 1861 to 1881, the population of Gubbio grew steadily from about 21,700 to just over 23,000. Growth accelerated in the early 20th century, reaching over 28,000 by 1911 and continuing to rise through the interwar period to more than 33,000 by 1936.

After World War II, the population peaked at over 37,000 around 1951, then declined notably in the following decades, falling to just above 31,000 by the 1970s. From that point onward, the population remained relatively stable with minor fluctuations, hovering around the low 30,000s into the early 21st century before a slight decline by 2021.

As of 2025, Gubbio has a population of 30,297, of whom 48.8% are male and 51.2% are female. Minors make up 13.3% of the population, and seniors make up 27.8%, compared to the Italian average of 14.9% and 24.7% respectively.

As of 2024, the foreign-born population is 3,183, equal to 10.5% of the population. The 5 largest foreign nationalities are Moroccans (373), Romanians (322), Albanians (293), Luxembourgers (290) and Ukrainians (284).

== Religion ==
=== Cathedral ===
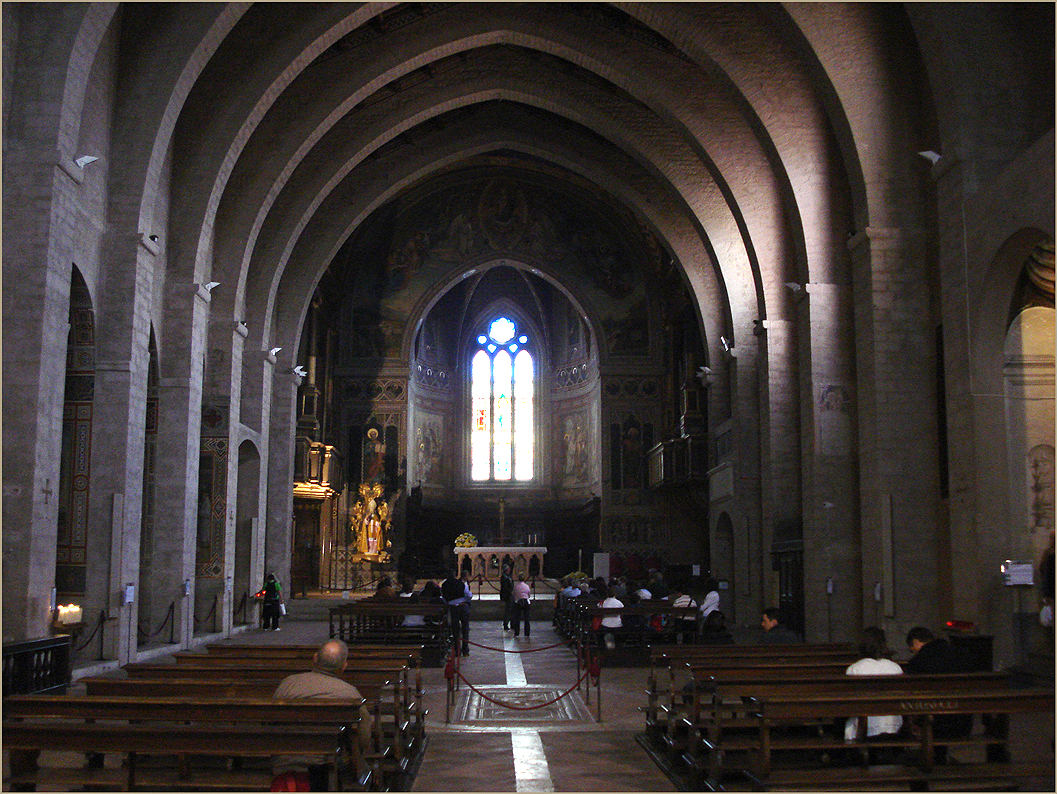
Cathedral interior

The cathedral, dedicated to Saints Marianus and James, stands at the foot of Monte Ingino and was built in the 13th and 14th centuries over an earlier Romanesque church, remains of which are visible on the right side of the façade. The pointed-arch portal is surmounted by a circular window framed by a band of foliage and surrounded by the symbols of the Evangelists and the Mystic Lamb. The interior, predominantly Gothic in style, has a single nave in the form of a Latin cross, supported by ten large transverse pointed arches.

The church contains paintings by 16th-century artists from Gubbio, including the Nucci family and Basili, as well as by Sinibaldi Ibi, Giuliano Presutti, and Dono Doni. A Baroque chapel in the middle of the right wall contains frescoes by Francesco Allegrini and a painting of the Birth of the Virgin by Gherardi. To the left of the high altar is the seat of the magistrates with painted imitation inlay by Benedetto Nucci.

In the choir is the episcopal seat, carved around the mid-16th century. A late antique sarcophagus beneath the high altar contains the relics of Saints James and Marianus. Traces of 14th- and 15th-century frescoes remain on the walls, while the murals of the apse, triumphal arch, and left chapels were painted by Augusto Stoppoloni between 1916 and 1918.

The episcopal palace stands near the cathedral.

=== San Francesco ===
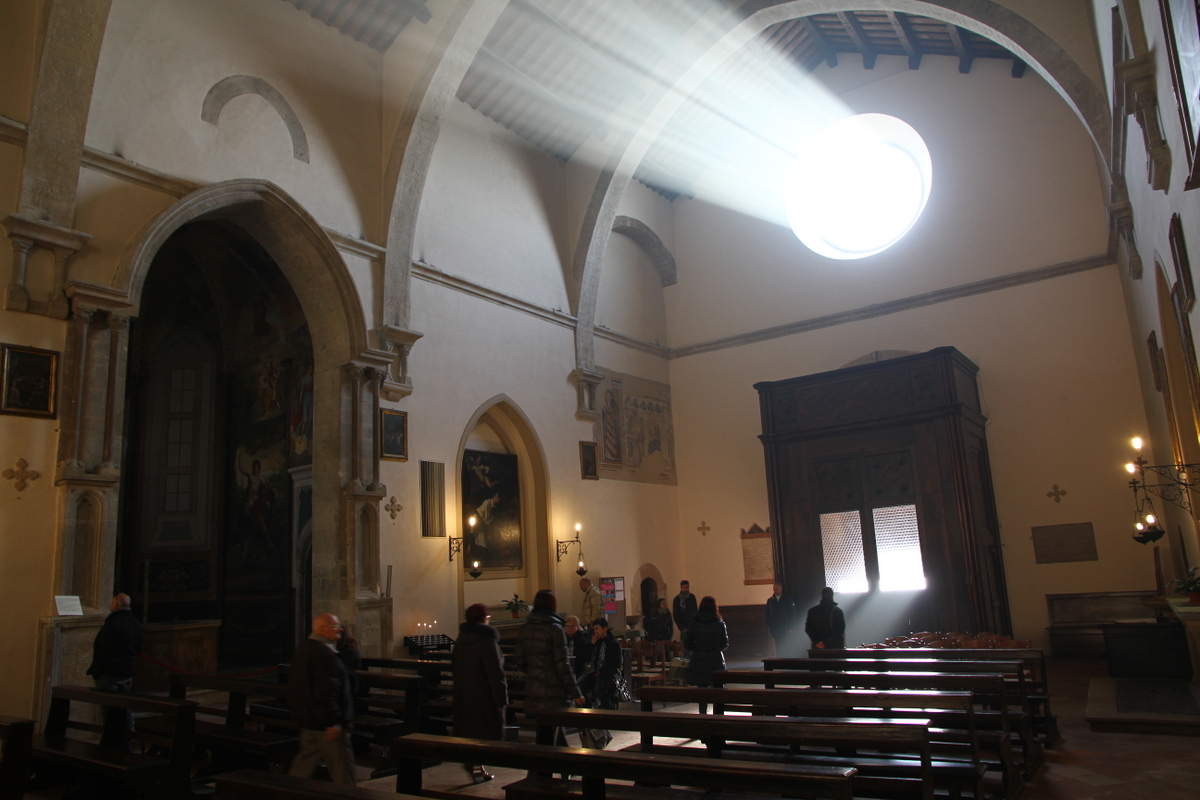
Sunlight streams through the rose window of the church of S. Giovanni.

The church of San Francesco stands in the lower part of Gubbio. It was built around 1255 within a large Franciscan complex erected on land belonging to the ancient Spadalonga family.

The building has an ogival plan and an unfinished façade that retains a Gothic portal and a cornice of hanging arches surmounted by a small rose window. Its three apses have a polygonal form interrupted by single-light windows. The interior is divided into three naves supported by fourteen tall columns with octagonal bases. The ribbed vaults belong to an 18th-century transformation of the building. Although the side walls once covered with frescoes have been partly lost, the apses preserve works from the 13th to the 15th centuries.

The left apse contains, in seventeen panels, the Stories of the Life of the Virgin, painted in the early 15th century by Ottaviano Nelli. In the upper part of the central apse is a fresco of Jesus enthroned with Saint Peter, Saint Paul, Saint Francis, and Saint Anthony, executed by a local follower of the Master of San Francesco in the second half of the 13th century. In the right apse, near the remains of the ancient fondaco, are 13th- and 14th-century frescoes: in the upper part two episodes from the life of Saint Francis, and below, the Redeemer flanked by the Evangelists within frames, together with frescoes of saints on the walls.

=== Santa Maria Nuova ===
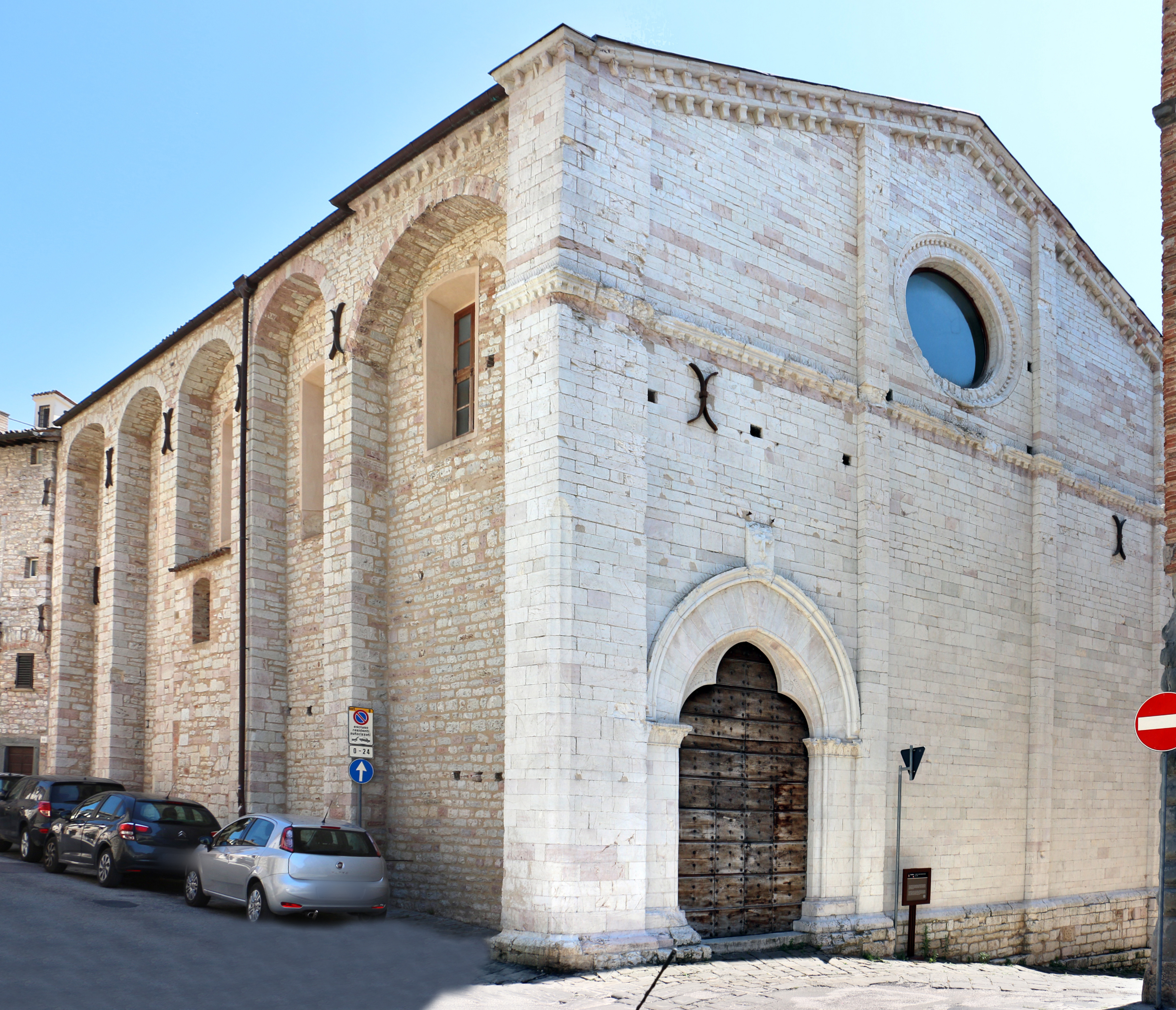
Church of Santa Maria Nuova

The church of Santa Maria Nuova stands in the historic center of Gubbio. Built between 1270 and 1280, it has a simple stone façade with an asymmetrical trilobed portal. The interior, with a single nave, was heavily altered in the 17th century, when the wall paintings were covered with plaster.

The church preserves the Madonna del Belvedere by Ottaviano Nelli, a 15th-century image that was the object of popular veneration and was enclosed within an aedicule. Frescoes rediscovered on the counter-façade include an Annunciation, a Crucifixion, saints, and two Maestà images. Along the right wall is a fresco depicting the Crucified Christ, the Blessing Christ, and the Madonna enthroned with Child.

The church also contains wooden furnishings, including a 16th-century gilded altar from the church of Sant'Agostino, and a painted funerary chest with Saints James and Marianus by the Expressionist Master of Santa Chiara, dating to the 14th century, which held the body of Saint Ubald.

=== Basilica of Sant'Ubaldo ===
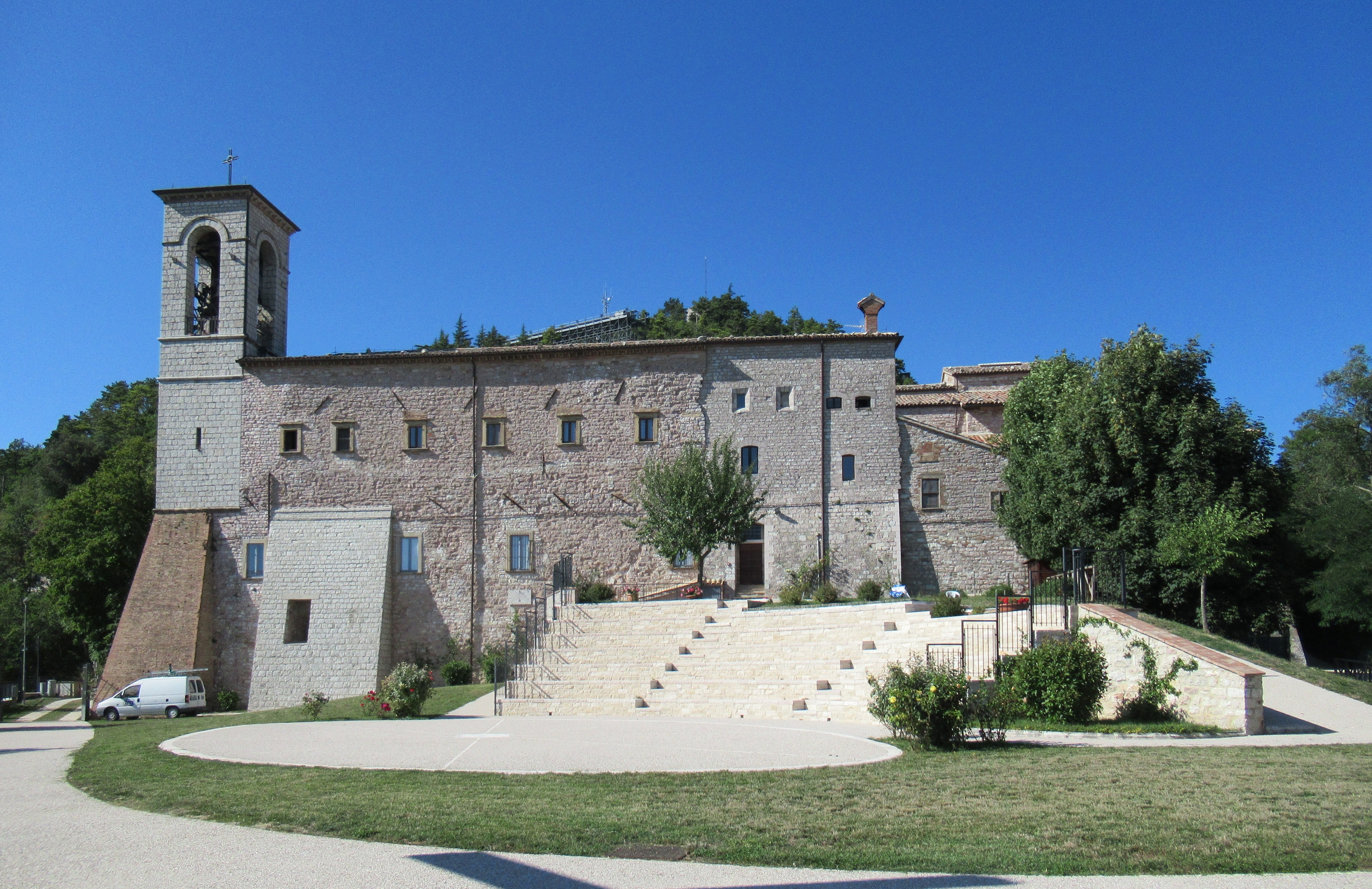
The Basilica of Sant'Ubaldo presents a fortress-like exterior with thick masonry walls

The Basilica of Sant'Ubaldo stands on the summit of the steep Monte Ingino, at whose foot the city extends. It houses the bronze urn containing the body of the patron saint Ubald. The basilica is also the finishing point of the Corsa dei Ceri.

Built on earlier medieval structures, it was enlarged from the beginning of the 16th century, when the convent and cloister were constructed. The exterior is plain, while the interior has five aisles and a semicircular apse. From the cloister, which contains 16th-century frescoes attributed to Pier Angelo Basili with scenes from the life of Saint Ubald, one enters the church, whose interior also contains frescoes dating from the 16th to the 18th centuries.

The Basilica preserves the Ceri of Gubbio.

=== Other religious buildings ===
- San Giovanni Battista, Gubbio: 13th-century church with one nave only with four transversal arches supporting the pitched roof, a model for later Gubbio churches.
- San Domenico, once known as San Martino
- Sant'Agostino
- Santa Croce della Foce

== Culture ==
=== Palazzo dei Consoli ===
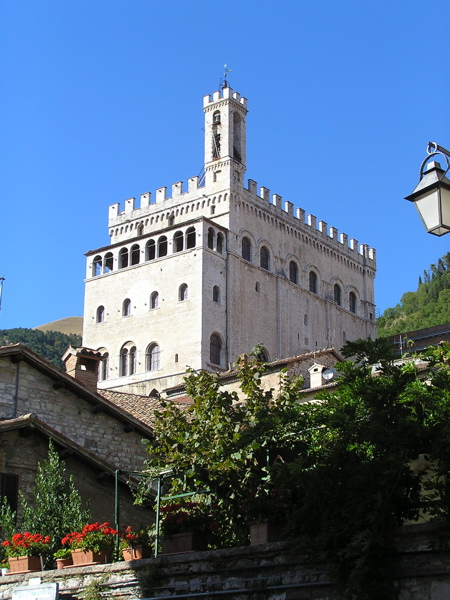
Palazzo dei Consoli

Palazzo dei Consoli was built between 1332 and 1349 to a design by Angelo da Orvieto, with the contribution of Matteo Gattapone. Rectangular in plan, it has a Gothic vertical emphasis created by pilasters dividing the façade into three sections.

It was built between 1332 and 1349 to a design by Angelo da Orvieto, whose name is recorded in an inscription above the entrance arch, with the contribution of Matteo Gattapone. Rectangular in plan, it has a Gothic vertical emphasis created by pilasters dividing the façade into three parts.

The entire first floor is occupied by the Sala dell'Arengo, covered by barrel vaults. The upper floor houses the art gallery and the ground floor the archaeological collection.

Among the principal objects are the Iguvine Tablets, seven bronze tablets bearing the most important text in the Umbrian language and an extensive description of religious rites from the ancient western world. The archaeological collections also include finds from the Umbrian and Roman periods.

In the Sala della Loggetta is the ceramics section, ranging from 14th-century archaic maiolica to 19th-century works, while the upper floor houses the municipal picture gallery, devoted to local artistic culture from the Middle Ages to the Baroque.

=== Palazzo dei Priori ===
The Palazzo dei Priori, also known as the Palazzo Pretorio or Palazzo del Podestà, stands opposite the Palazzo dei Consoli, and serves as the seat of the municipality. It was probably designed by Matteo Gattapone in 1349 and was originally intended as the seat of the Podestà, head of the executive power, in contrast to the Palazzo dei Consoli, which was the seat of legislative power.

Work on the building was interrupted in 1350 for economic reasons connected with the spread of the plague, and the façade facing the square still shows the effects of that interruption. The building remained incomplete. Its construction is characterized by a single central pillar supporting robust arches that connect to the perimeter walls and carry the load of the vaults and floors.

The palace was modified and enlarged over time. The brick structure attached on the left dates from the late 17th century and was connected to the earlier building in 1949 by a broad external staircase.

In the mayor's room are two 17th-century canvases by Allegrini from his series of battle scenes. The palace also houses the library founded in 1666 by Bishop Alessandro Sperelli and the Armanni archive, which contains numerous manuscripts and codices, including the Storia di Gubbio by Greffolino.

=== Palazzo Ducale ===
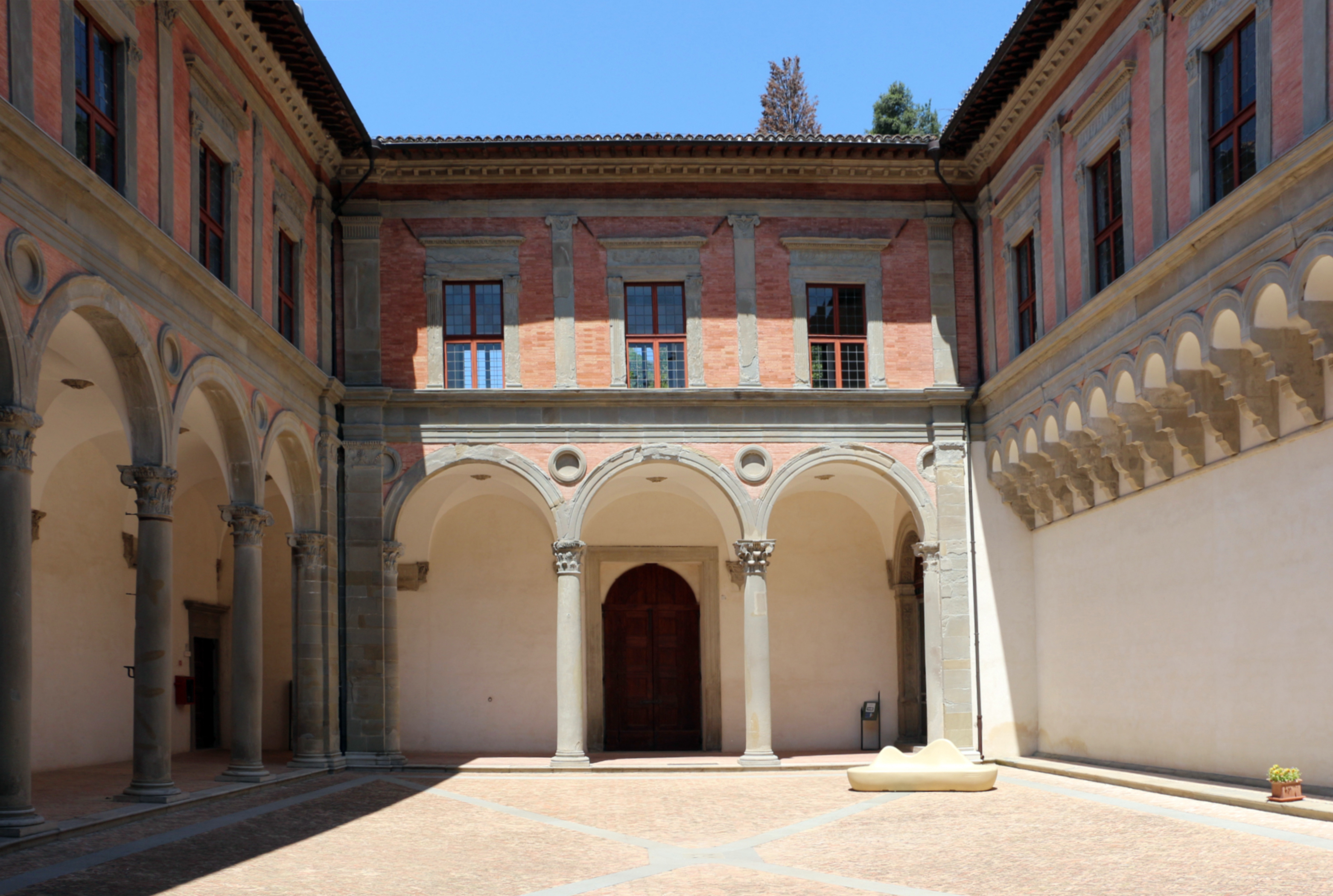
Palazzo Ducale, inner courtyard

Palazzo Ducale, also known as Palazzo della Corte, occupies the summit of the city on the site of an earlier fortress built by the dukes of Urbino, who long ruled Gubbio. The palace stands opposite the cathedral and was executed according to a design by Francesco di Giorgio Martini. Its courtyard combines combining elements of different architectural orders in a manner characteristic of the 15th and 16th centuries.

The windows, doors, and fireplaces feature frames and lintels in bluish pietra serena, all executed in low relief based on models derived from the ancient arabesques. The palace was begun by Federico II, duke of Urbino, and completed by his son Guidobaldo I. The building now serves as a museum.

=== Roman theater ===
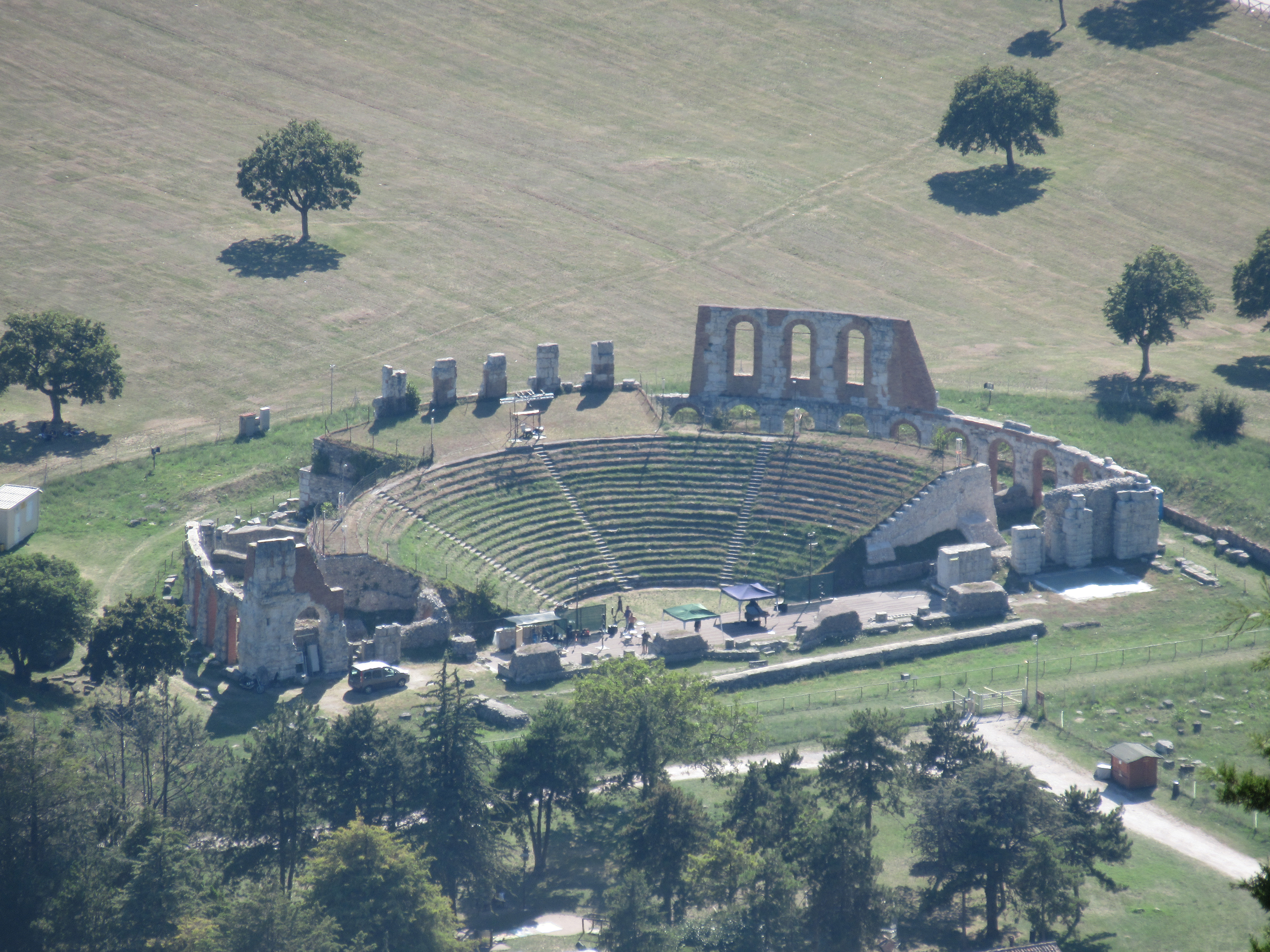
Roman theater

The Roman theater was completed by the magistrate Gnaeus Satrius Rufus around 20 BC, was built with large limestone blocks worked in rusticated ashlar. It has two orders of arches, of which the lower order and some arches of the upper gallery survive.

Remains of opus reticulatum are present in the vomitoria corridors. The cavea is divided into four wedges, and the bands without steps probably held wooden stairways. The orchestra, paved with limestone slabs, channels rainwater into a large cistern beneath the pulpitum. The scaenae frons has two rectangular side niches and a central semicircular niche. The building could hold about 6,000 spectators and was among the largest of its time.

The date of Gubbio's theatre is unknown, although its size, its layout, and the rustication on the exterior suggest that it was built during or after the reign of Claudius. The remains of a large structure nearby may represent a mill of some sort. The Roman temple of the Guastaglia, within present-day Gubbio, has had its foundations excavated, and an inscription originally in the theatre (now in the Palazzo dei Consoli) records that the quattuorvir Gnaeus Satrius Rufus financed the restoration of the theatre and of a temple of Diana at Gubbio in the 1st century CE.

A funerary inscription records one Vittorius Rufus as avispex extispicus sacerdos publicus et privatus — that is, someone who interpreted bird flight and entrails, as well as managed public and private rituals — and another lists a Sestus Vetiarius Surus with a similar title. This is unusual because this profession was not very common in the Roman world, but it had been important among the Umbri and Etruscans (and featured prominently in the Iguvine tablets), suggesting that these religious practices continued locally. In the Imperial period, the cults of Isis and her son Harpocrates were also imported from Egypt.

=== Mausoleum ===
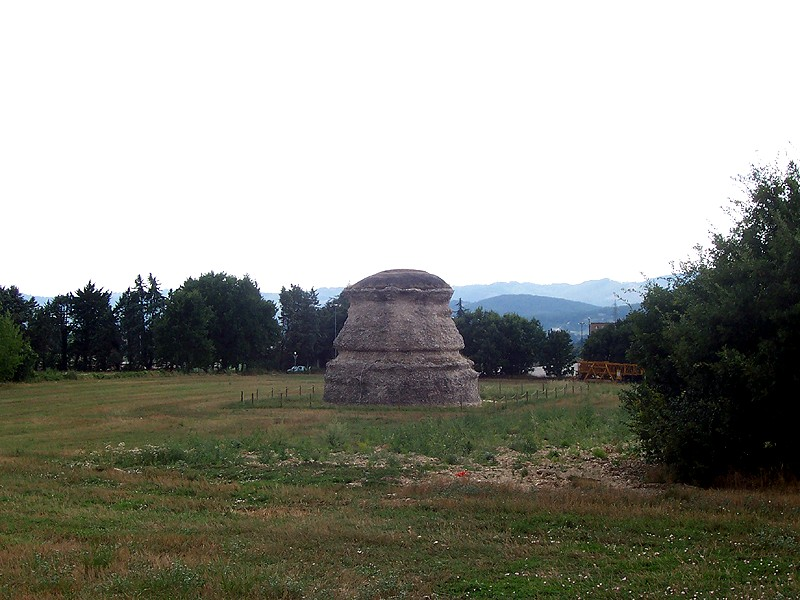
Mausoleum

Near the city stands a monumental mausoleum, whose origin has been the subject of various interpretations The structure is identified as an Etruscan tomb. Its interior remains intact and consists of a chamber constructed from large squared blocks of travertine, joined without mortar. A finely executed cornice of Etruscan order separates the walls from the vaulted ceiling, which is also formed of travertine blocks.

The chamber measures 6.1 metres (20 ft) in length, 7.6 m (25 ft) in width, and about 5.5 m (18 ft) in height, with a base that extends deeper below. The exterior, though partly ruined, presents a circular structure.

=== Ceramics ===
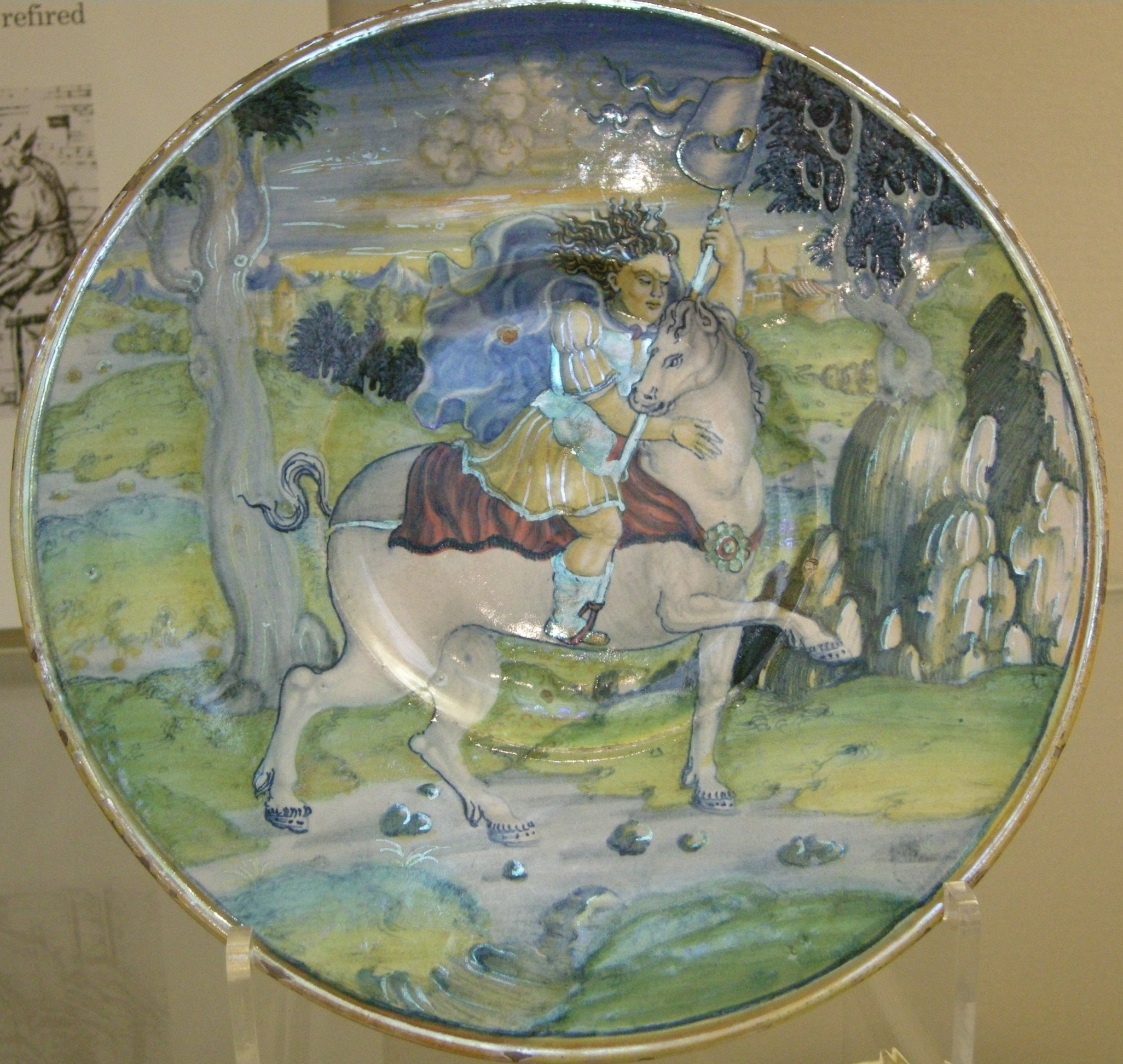
Gubbio maiolica by Giorgio Andreoli, 1525

The city's ceramic reputation is especially linked to Giorgio Andreoli, who arrived in Gubbio in 1489 from Intra. He was noted for the use of lustre, including gold, silver, green, and especially a deep ruby red that distinguished Gubbio's ceramics from those of Deruta. Plates, tree-shaped objects, cups, and vases emerged from his workshop, while around 1530 the raised dish on a low foot became a leading form in his production. The technique was applied to istoriato wares and to decorative motifs including arabesques, palmettes, grotesques, trophies, and garlands, alongside orange, blue, yellow, and green.

After a long decline, ceramic production revived in the second half of the 19th century as part of a broader cultural movement in Umbria to recover Renaissance tradition. In the early 20th century, when Aldo Ajò began his work, his style was imitated by pupils and followers. Other named ceramists include Baffoni, Cavicchi, Faravelli, Monarchi, Notari, and the Rossi brothers. Eugubine ceramists also pursued forms beyond lustred maiolica, including buccheri polished and decorated with incisions or polychrome glazes and gold, as well as ceramics inspired by medieval models in which cobalt blue predominates.

=== Other secular buildings ===
The Logge dei Tiratori is a covered structure built in the first half of the 16th century above the great hospital. It was used as a space where cloth could be stretched to its required dimensions and still survives today. On the façade of the building is a wall painting of the Madonna between Saints Peter and Paul by Bernardino di Nanni, dated 1473. Attached to the complex is the church of Santa Maria dei Laici, erected in 1313 and later enlarged, perhaps to a design by Francesco Allegrini, during the restructuring of the whole complex. Its single nave is decorated with 24 small paintings of the life of Mary by Felice Damiani.

The city has six principal public gates named Porta Santa Lucia, Porta Santa Croce, Porta Sant'Ubaldo, Porta Sant'Agostino, Porta San Pietro, and Porta Marmorea.

- Palazzo and Torre Gabrielli
- Museo Cante Gabrielli: This museum is housed in the Palazzo del Capitano del Popolo, which once belonged to the Gabrielli family.
- Vivian Gabriel Oriental Collection: This is a museum of Tibetan, Nepalese, Chinese and Indian art. The collection was donated to the municipality by Edmund Vivian Gabriel (1875–1950), British colonial officer and adventurer, a collateral descendant of the Gabrielli who were lords of Gubbio in the Middle Ages.

=== Other cultural heritage ===
In Hermann Hesse's novel Steppenwolf (1927) the isolated and tormented protagonist – a namesake of the wolf – consoles himself at one point by recalling a scene that the author might have beheld during his travels: "(...) that slender cypress on the hill over Gubbio that, though split and riven by a fall of stone, yet held fast to life and put forth with its last resources a new sparse tuft at the top".

Several academies contributed to the intellectual life of Gubbio, including the Accademia degli Oziosi, the Accademia dei Sonnacchiosi, and the Accademia degli Anziosi.

== Events ==
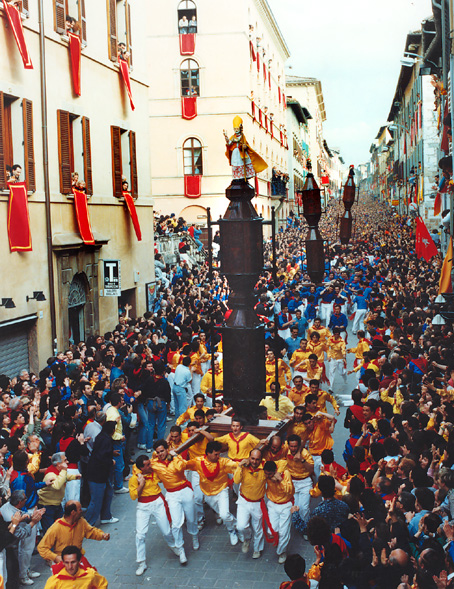
Corsa dei Ceri

The Festa dei Ceri takes place in Gubbio every year on 15 May, on the eve of the feast of the city's patron, Saint Ubald, who died in 1160. The celebration centers on the carrying of the Ceri from the church of Santa Maria Nuova through the historic center to the Basilica of Sant'Ubaldo on Mount Ingino.

The Ceri are three large wooden structures weighing about 400 kilograms (880 lb) each, surmounted respectively by statues of Saint Ubald, patron of masons and stonecutters, Saint George, patron of artisans and shopkeepers, and Saint Anthony Abbot, patron of farmers and students. They are carried on the shoulders of the ceraioli in a race through the streets of the city.

Before the race, Piazza Grande hosts the alzata of the Ceri at noon, followed by three circuits of the square. After the mostra through the streets of the city, the Ceri are taken to Via Savelli Della Porta until the start of the race.

The Procession of the Dead Christ takes place on Good Friday, with a parade of traditional religious symbols passing through the streets to the accompaniment of a sung miserere.

== Sport ==
A.S. Gubbio 1910 football club play in Serie C at the Pietro Barbetti Stadium.

== Twin towns – Sister cities ==
Gubbio is twinned with:

Thann, France; Salon-de-Provence, France; Wertheim, Germany; (United States) Jessup, USA; (United Kingdom) Huntingdon, UK; (United Kingdom) Godmanchester, UK	Sassari, Italy; Palmi, Italy; Viterbo, Italy; Nola, Italy

== Notable people ==
Among writers and scholars from Gubbio are Stefano Eugubino, who flourished at the time of Justin and wrote a Chronicon ab origine mundi usque ad Justinum imperatorem; Gabrielli Fazio, a philosopher of the 12th century; Marino di Rosso, a historian active shortly after 1300; Ubaldo di Bastiano da Gubbio, who reportedly studied under Dante Alighieri; Armanno Armanni, author of the Fiorita, a well-known 14th-century linguistic text; and Vittoria Accoramboni, born in 1557, a poet also noted for her beauty and the misfortunes of her life.

Military figures include Bosone Raffaelli, captain of Gubbio in 1263 and Ghibelline podestà of Arezzo in 1266; Bino di Pietro Gabrielli, podestà of Florence in 1306 and commander of Florentine forces during the siege of Pistoia; and Bosone II Raffaelli, a prominent figure in central Italy in the early 14th century, podestà of Arezzo in 1316 and 1317, who became acquainted with Dante Alighieri and later hosted him in Gubbio. Also notable are Federico da Montefeltro, Duke of Urbino, born in Gubbio in 1422, as well as Carlo Gabrielli and Cesare Bentivogli.

In the arts, Giovanni da Gubbio built the cathedral of San Rufino in Assisi in 1140. Matteo Gattapone designed several of the principal monuments of Gubbio. Painters associated with the city include Guido di Palmeruccio, Martino di Nello, Nucci, and Damiani.

== See also ==
- Roman Catholic Diocese of Gubbio
- Mount Ingino Christmas Tree
