= History of AS Gualdo Calcio =

Italian football club history

The history of Associazione Sportiva Gualdo Calcio has covered 93 years of the football from the club based in Gualdo Tadino, Umbria.

== From S.S. Gualdo to A.S. Gualdo ==
=== S.S. Gualdo ===
The club was founded in 1920 as Società Sportiva Gualdo and made several appearances in professional football, reaching the Serie C1 promotion playoffs twice, in 1995 and 1998. In 1995 the club narrowly missed promotion losing the promotion playoff final on penalty shootouts to Avellino.

=== A.S. Gualdo ===
The club was dropped by the federation because of financial troubles in 2006, after a season in the Serie C2/B; a new club, A.S. Gualdo Calcio, was subsequently admitted to Promozione (7th level of Italian football) and immediately won it, being therefore promoted to Eccellenza for the season 2007–08.

=== Colors and badge ===
The team's colors were red and white.

=== Honours ===
- Best placement: 3rd, Serie C1/B, 1994–95
- Highest home attendance: 4,500: vs Trapani, 1995-06-18; vs Nocerina, 1998-06-07

=== Notable former managers ===
- (Italy) Alberto Cavasin
- (Italy) Walter Novellino
- (Italy) Giuliano Sonzogni
- (Italy) Agatino Cuttone
- (Italy) Paolo Beruatto

== Merger with A.S.D. Casacastalda ==
In the summer 2013 A.S. Gualdo that played in Eccellenza was merged with A.S.D. Casacastalda, club of serie D of Casacastalda, a frazione of Valfabbrica, using its old sports title, founding the new club of A.S. Gualdo Casacastalda.
