= San Francesco, Mondavio =

Church building in Mondavio, Italy

Coordinates: 43.674468°N 12.969078°E

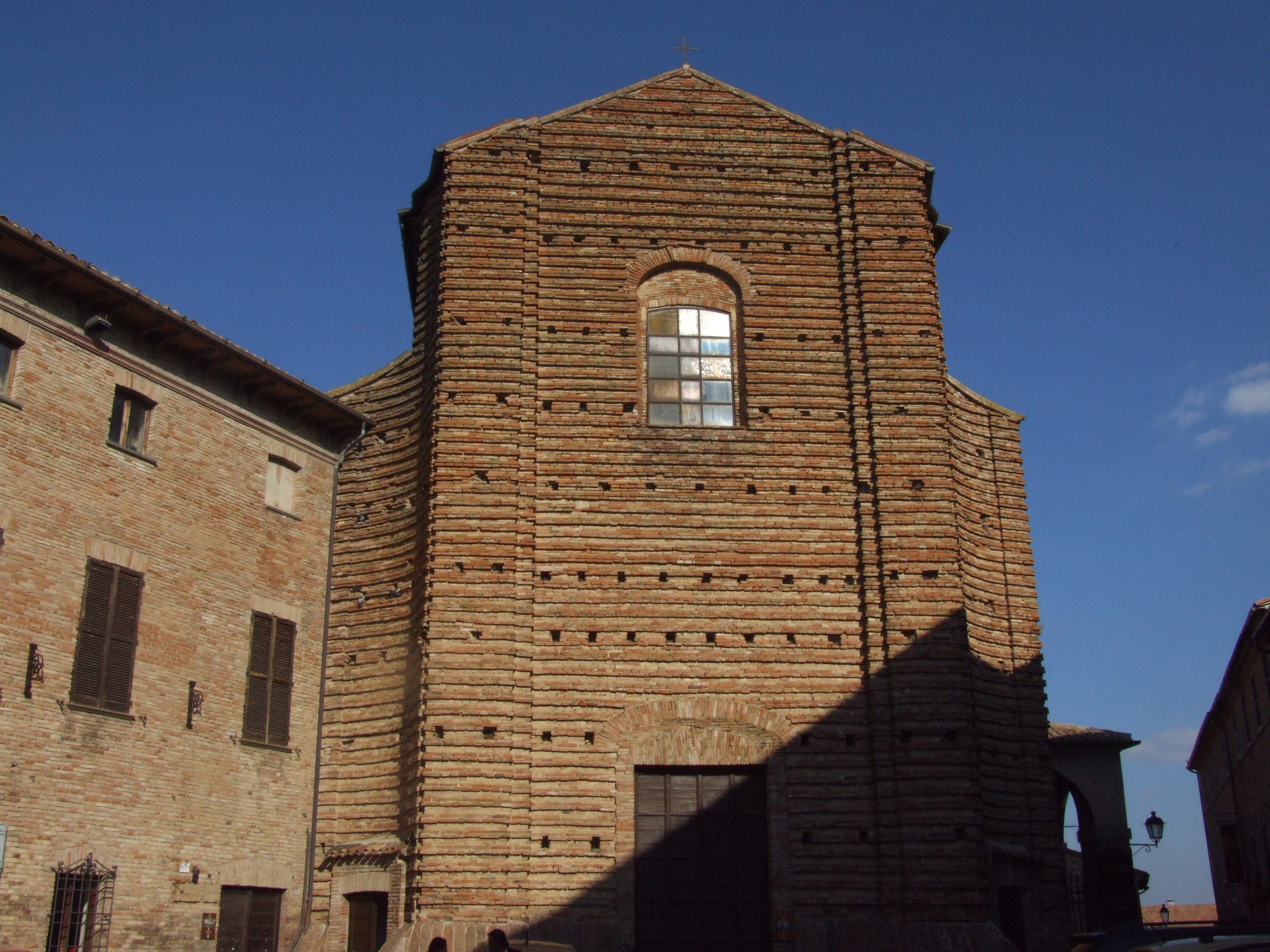
Brick facade of San Francesco

San Francesco is a Gothic-style, Roman Catholic church and convent located near the center of Mondavio, region of Marche, Italy. The convent is now part of an elementary school at Piazza Matteotti.

== History ==
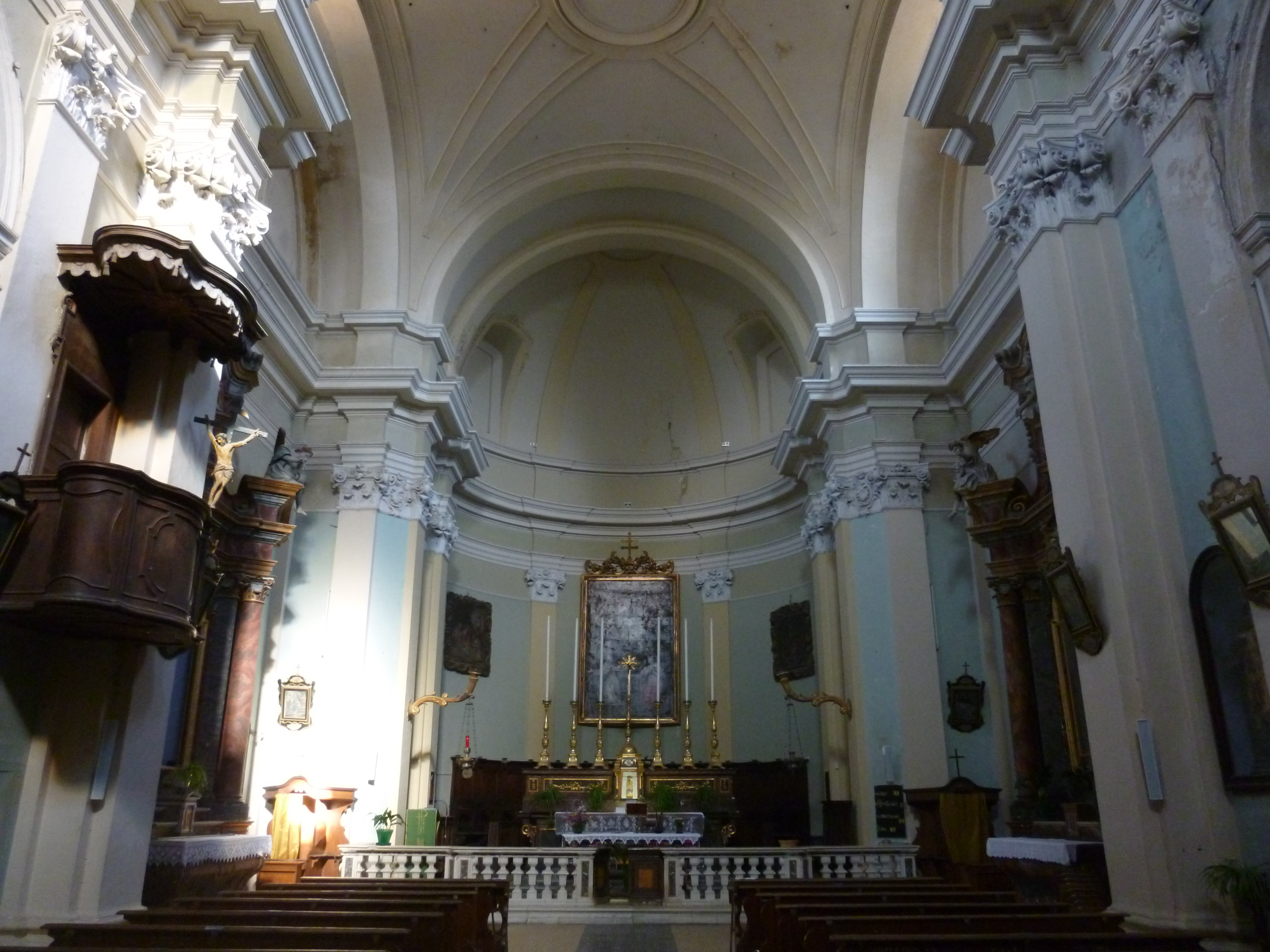
Interior of church

While the exterior is simple unfinished brick; the interior was refurbished in Baroque fashion. The flanks of the church have buttresses. The bell-tower arises from the convent. The church dates from 1292, putatively at a site where St Francis of Assisi preached. The convent was suppressed in the 19th century and was used for various purposes. The interior has houses the relics of the Martyr Lucius, and has a medieval wooden crucifix and paintings, including an Immaculate Conception, (1535) by Giuliano Presutti.
