= Santa Maria della Quercia, Mondavio =

Church building in Mondavio, Italy

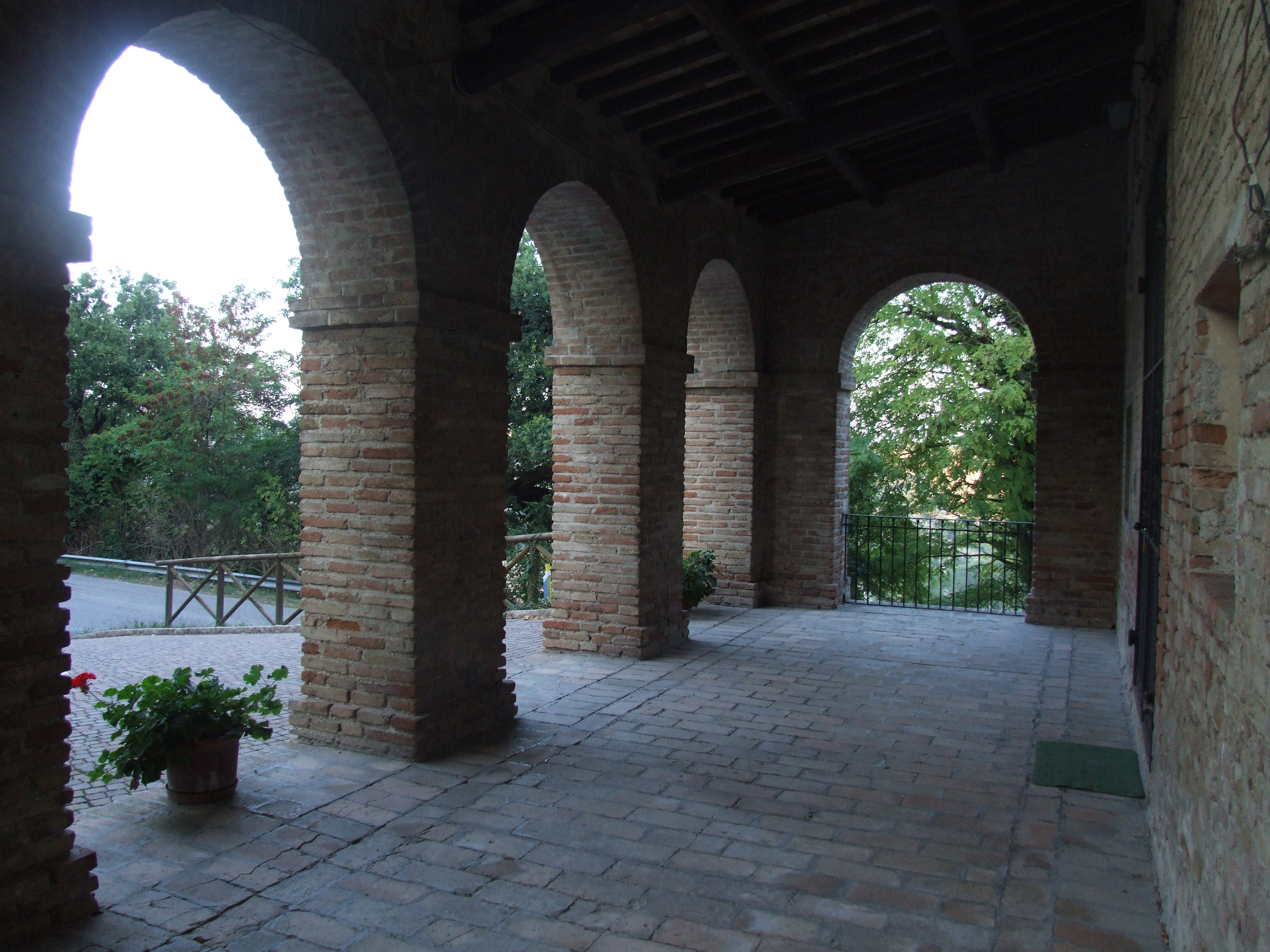

Santa Maria della Quercia is a Renaissance-style, Roman Catholic church located just outside the town center of Mondavio, on the road that leads to the frazione of San Michele al Fiume outside of the town, in the region of Marche, Italy.

== History ==
The church was rebuilt in 1521 at the site of a 13th-century church. The church has a simple exterior with a brick portico. The interior has a chapel with frescoes (1535) depicting a Crucifixion, Madonna and Child with St Roch and Sebastian, and another Madonna and Child attributed to the brothers Presutti (Giuliano Presutti) from Fano. Along the windows are frescoes depicting St Paul and Peter by Ridolfi.
