= Abdullah Fusseini =

Ghanaian footballer

Personal information
- Full name: Abdullah Fusseini
- Date of birth: 1 July 1982 (age 44)
- Place of birth: Accra, Ghana
- Height: 1.80 m (5 ft 11 in)
- Position: Midfielder

Youth career
- 1993–1995: King Faisal Babes

Senior career*
Years	Team	Apps	(Gls)
1996–1999	King Faisal Babes	131	(27)
1999–2002	Torino	1	(0)
2002–2004	Gualdo	56	(2)
2004–2005	Torino	0	(0)
2005	Gualdo	5	(0)
2005–2006	Casale	13	(0)
2006–2007	Gubbio	23	(3)
2007–2008	Melfi	22	(0)
2008–2009	Catanzaro	3	(0)
Total		254	(32)

International career
2006	Ghana	1	(0)

Managerial career
- 2009–: F.C. Canavese (scout)
- * Club domestic league appearances and goals

Abdullah Fusseini (born 1 July 1982) is a Ghanaian former footballer.

== Career ==
He has previously played for King Faisal Babes, Torino, Gualdo, Casale, Gubbio and Melfi.

== International career ==
Fusseini won one cap for the Black Stars in the 2006 FIFA World Cup qualification against Tunisia national football team 2006.
