= Rocca di Mondavio =

Coordinates: 43.6741°N 12.9683°E

- Mondavio
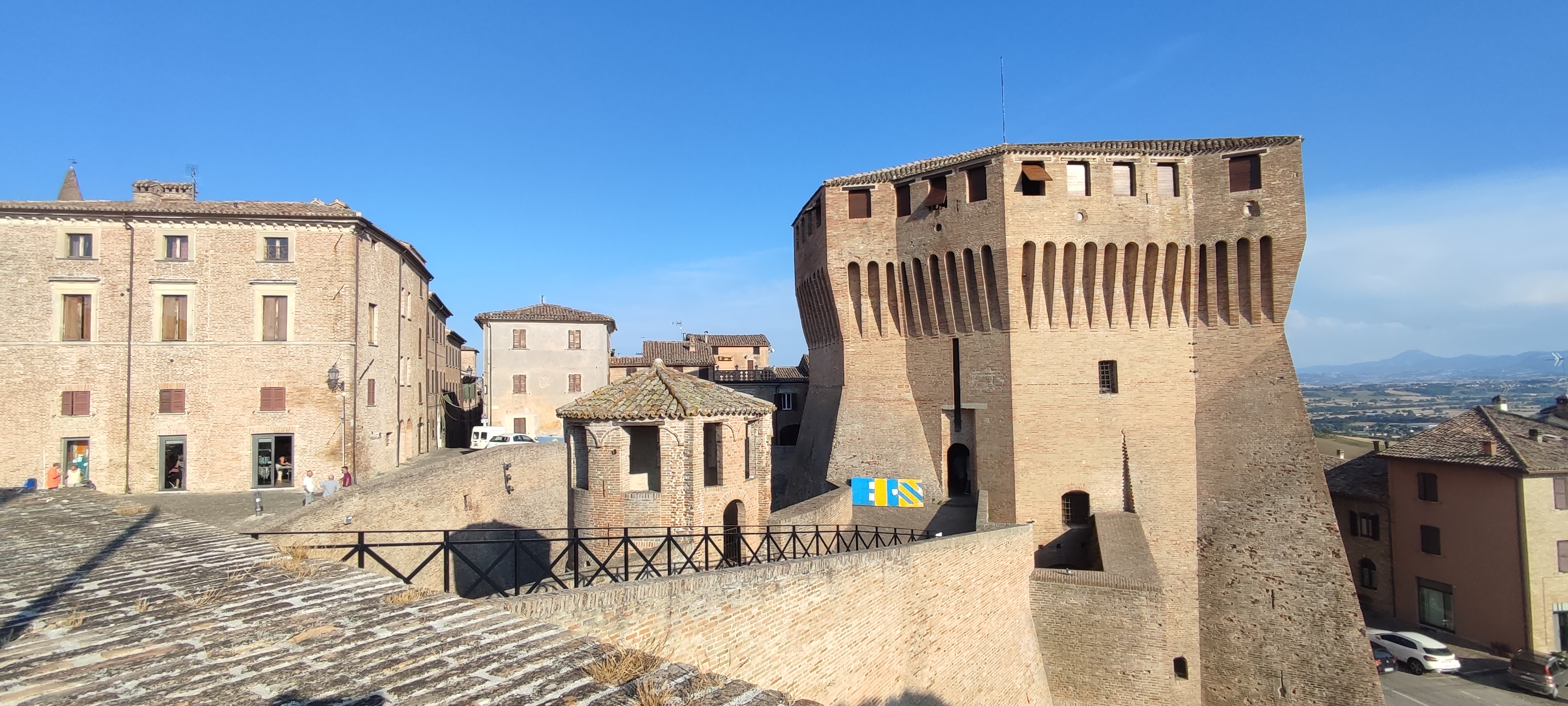

Site information
- Type: Castle

Location
- Location within Italy

Site history
- Built: 1492

The Rocca di Mondavio or Rocca Roveresca di Mondavio is a 15th-century castle in the town of Mondavio, in the region of Marche, Italy. The castle is now two museums.

== History ==
The castle was commissioned by Giovanni Della Rovere around 1492 from the architect Francesco di Giorgio Martini. The castle, in excellent state of conservation since it was never sieged or bombed, houses a museum about personal and siege weapons, armor, uniforms, and battle strategies used in the age when such bulwarks were most useful. A trebuchet, built to designs of Martini, is on display in the moat. A torture reenactment is on display in the dungeon.

Every August 14–15, the castle sponsors a historic re-enactment of a period banquet, theater, and competitions. The events are meant to recall the reconciliation of the town with Giovanni Della Rovere, Lord of Senigallia. The castle also houses painting exhibitions.

== Description ==
The crowning of the building is made of a stretched machicolation and a covered walkway. The structure is heavily splayed at its lower third, then lined with stone rings, and the upper part goes outwards again. Its shape has been compared to a big hourglass.
