= San Domenico, Gubbio =

Roman Catholic church in Gubbio, Italy

Coordinates: 43.3545°N 12.5748°E

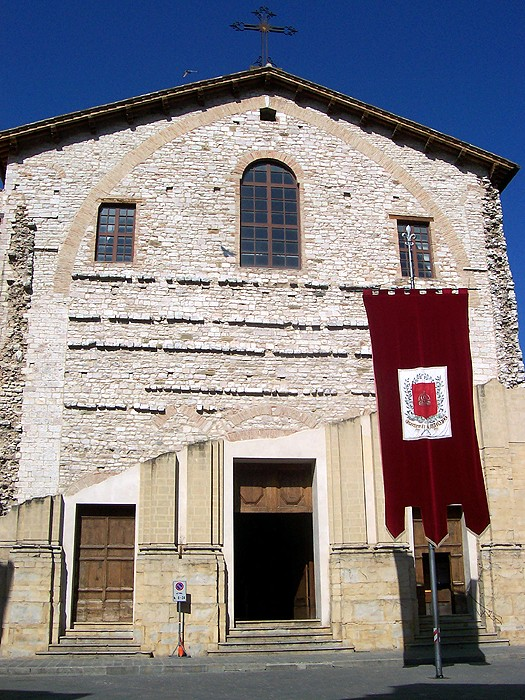
Unfinished facade of church

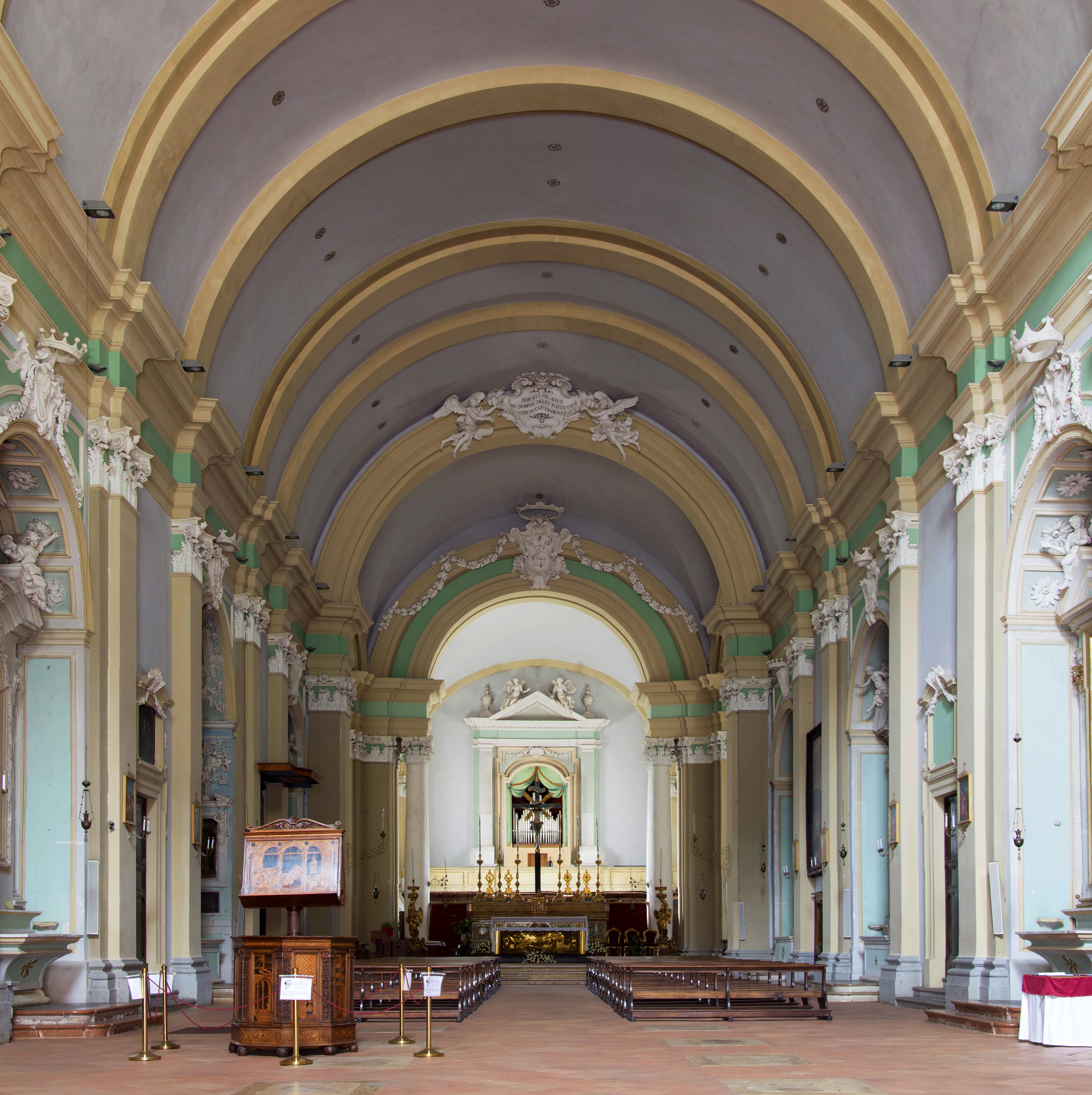
Nave interior

The church of San Domenico, also sometimes called San Martino, is a medieval Roman Catholic church in the lower town of Gubbio, Umbria, in Italy. At one time, the church was dedicated to St Martin of Tours.

== History ==
A church at the site is documented since the 11th century, but the present church was first built in the 13th century and granted to the Dominican order. Further expansions of the church were made in the 14th and 15th centuries. The exterior remains unfinished in brick.

The interior nave was transformed in the 18th century, however many of the chapels retain their original fresco decoration. The first two chapels to left and right are frescoed with the Life of St Peter Martyr by followers of Ottaviano Nelli and a late 14th-century Coronation of the Virgin. In the 5th chapel on the left is an altarpiece of St Vincent Ferrer attributed to Jacopo Bedi; while the 6th chapel on the left has a Mary Magdalen (1612) by Giovanni Baglioni; the left transept has a fresco on the Three Magi (1603) by Felice Damiani; and the seventh chapel has an altarpiece depicting the Communion of the Apostles attributed to Giuliano Presutti. The carved wooden choir stalls were completed in the 16th century.
