= Mondavio =

- Comune
- Comune di Mondavio
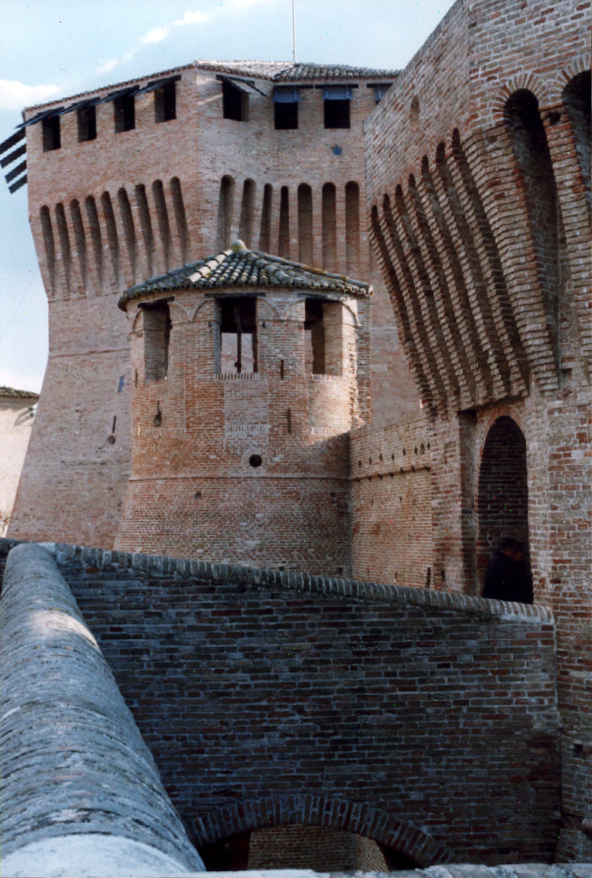
- Rocca di Mondavio

- Coat of arms

- Location within Italy Location within Marche
- Coordinates: 43°40′N 12°58′E
- Country: Italy
- Region: Marche
- Province: Pesaro e Urbino (PU)
- Frazioni: Cavallara, San Filippo sul Cesano, San Michele al Fiume, Sant'Andrea di Suasa

Government
  - Mayor: Mirco Zenobi

Area
  - Total: 29.5 km^{2} (11.4 sq mi)
- Elevation: 280 m (920 ft)

Population (31 October 2020)
  - Total: 3,728
  - Density: 126/km^{2} (327/sq mi)
- Demonym: Mondaviesi
- Time zone: UTC+1 (CET)
  - Summer (DST): UTC+2 (CEST)
- Postal code: 61040
- Dialing code: 0721
- Website: Official website

Mondavio is a comune (municipality) in the Province of Pesaro e Urbino in the Italian region Marche, located about 45 kilometres (28 mi) west of Ancona and about 30 kilometres (19 mi) south of Pesaro. It is one of I Borghi più belli d'Italia ("The most beautiful villages of Italy").

== Main sights ==
- Rocca di Mondavio, a Renaissance castle designed by Francesco di Giorgio Martini and built between 1482 and 1492.
- Santi Pietro e Paterniano
- Santa Maria della Quercia
- San Francesco
- Civic Museum and Pinacoteca, Mondavio

== Twin towns ==
- Fontenay-Trésigny, France
- Vilassar de Dalt, Spain
