= Santi Pietro e Paterniano, Mondavio =

Church building in Mondavio, Italy

Santi Pietro e Paterniano is a Baroque-style, Roman Catholic collegiate church located in the town of Mondavio, region of Marche, Italy.

== History ==
The church was founded in 1444 with the unification of two parishes. It was refurbished in 1563 based on the designs of Bartolomeo Genga. The church was again redecorated and enlarged in 1741 when it was made a collegiate church.

The interior hosts stucco decorations by Brandani including a Nativity. The adjacent tower of the Porta di San Pietro was incorporated as an apse. The lateral chapels were added. In the Chapel of the Holy Sacrament is a canvas depicting a Guardian Angel by Giuseppe Bottani. There is also a small canvas of the Christ of the Passion surrounded by Angels with the instruments of the Passion. In the apse is a Glory of the Virgin with St John Evangelist, and St Catherine attributed to followers of Federico Barocci. In the Chapel of the Patron Saints is a canvas depicting the Virgin, St Michael Archangel, and St Pope Eleuterio with 18th-century Mondavio in the background by Sebastiano Ceccarini. Carved wooden choirs stalls line the apse.
