= Augusto Stoppoloni =

Italian painter (1855–1936)

Augusto Stoppoloni, or Augusto Guglielmo Stoppoloni, (22 March 1855 – 6 July 1936) was an Italian painter.

== Biography ==
Augusto was born in San Severino Marche to Antonio and Anna Trotti. He was noted for his drawing skills as a young man, and on 11 November 1869, he was admitted to the Academy of San Luca, where he was favored by the director Francesco Podesti, who stated:

I have watched with great pleasure the copy made on canvas by the talented young artist Augusto Stoppoloni of the Pinturicchio in the Cathedral of San Severino. In the first impression I got as I could find out before me the original, so it is so well guessed the pitch of those sweet colors and mortified; the subtle diligence and restraint in the color pastes where no one sees touches that indicate the difficulty and fatigue, although there is much that seems an ancient painting, although clear and limpid.

In the same year, the painter was present when Italian troops entered Rome through Porta Pia, and he painted some sketches of the battle then exposed to the historical exhibition of the Italian Risorgimento. During this period he also attended the figure drawing academy called the "scuola libera serale di nudo" (free night school of the nude). At this time "Colera in Sicilia nel 1867 (Cholera in Sicily in 1867)" won a government competition in 1880 and was later purchased by the National Gallery of Modern Art in Rome. It is also the official portrait painting, tapestry and restoration. In 1884, at the Mostra of Fine Arts in Turin, he exhibited the following paintings: Un meriggio; tratto di donna; La patria è in pericolo: Ti voglio ritrattare; La guardiana; I tacchini; and Il pollaio. In 1889 he exported from Rome two paintings destined to the Cardinal of Rende-Benevento: "A portrait of Papa Orsini" and a copy of a Madonna. King Umberto I bought the canvas "Il superbo cavaliere" (The grand knight.). Stoppoloni also painted a portrait for the Galleria Doria-Pamphili.

After completing the portrait of Pope Leo XIII (1888), and scoring a grand painting inspired by the theme of the canonization of the Founders of the Order of Servants of Mary (Rome, San Marcello al Corso), in 1891, at the invitation of Cardinal Vaughn, the painter moved to England where he decorated cathedrals, ran a school of Christian art, painted portraits for famous families, frescoed the castle of the Duchess of Manchester, and designed tapestries. Just from London, Stoppoloni sent, again in Turin, to the exhibition Quadrennial 1902, the Hagar works and arduous golden Post. His participation in the Venice Biennale that same year is underlined by la etter that Antonio Fradeletto sent:

"I trust she has not been too unhappy with our position, and then let me ask you the warm and trusting appeal for want right now to promise your cooperation for the next show. This show, as you can at that time also detect the press, it will play an important artistic and financial well above the previous year. Her austere genius and artist Sue solid skills allow us commit ourselves to You very ..."

The painter stayed in England until 1910, producing many portraits and participating in exhibitions in America (St. Louis), in Paris (Salon of 1904), and in Venice (Biennale 1901, 1903). After winning in 1905 the prize of the figure at the Crystal Palace in London, Stoppoloni was invited to 'Exhibition in Milan, called for the inauguration of the Simplon Pass (1906 Bluebells and Lamone found in this manner Picciol a child and with it a goat that fed him). For the following year's Biennale he realized a bronze plaque, with oak frame, depicting two female figures dancing in a forest.

During the First World War, Stoppoloni made many paintings of patriotic character and many sketches. Very interesting is the canvas, pointillist stamp, "Il Santo" (1918). Among the last works was the painting "San Venanzio Fortunato" (1923), featuring intense effects of light and shadow.

The painter was also known as the author of watercolors, tapestries, frescoes (for Kimbolton Castle), and restoration. He died on 6 July 1936 in Gubbio.
