= Bosone da Gubbio =

Italian politician and writer

Bosone da Gubbio is the name traditionally associated with an Italian politician and writer of the late 13th and early 14th centuries. However, modern scholarship, particularly an article in the Dizionario Biografico degli Italiani, has concluded that the name refers to two distinct individuals: a father and his son, Bosone Novello (also known as Bosonello).

Historical sources have often conflated the careers of the two men. Generally, the earlier political activity in the 13th century is attributed to the father, while the more extensive political career of the 14th century belongs to the son, Bosone Novello. Whether the literary achievements are to be attributed to a father or son is a matter of dispute. The family name de' Raffaelli, sometimes associated with them, is considered a later invention by an 18th-century biographer.

== Bosone da Gubbio (father) ==
The elder Bosone was a Ghibelline politician active in the 13th century. He is recorded as being the Podestà of Arezzo in 1266 and 1315. He was a contemporary of Dante Alighieri, although claims of a close political or literary relationship are not supported by modern scholarship. In 1277, Bosone-father held the position of capitano del popolo in Forlì and was still living in 1316–1317, when his son's political career had begun.

== Bosone Novello da Gubbio (son) ==
Bosone Novello had a more prominent and well-documented career as both a politician and a writer. As a Ghibelline, he was exiled from Gubbio with his faction in 1315. The 1300 banishment is disputed.

His political career included numerous high-ranking posts in several central Italian cities:

- Podestà of Arezzo (1316–1317)
- Podestà of Viterbo (1317)
- Podestà of Lucca (1319)
- Podestà of Todi (1324)
- Senator of Rome (1338–1339)

Bosone Novello was alive as late as 1349 and had died by 1377.

=== Historical uncertainties ===
Some historical accounts, notably the chronicle of Giovanni Villani, claim that a Bosone da Gubbio served as Captain of the People of Pisa in 1327 and imperial vicar in Pisa for Louis the Bavarian in 1328. The Dizionario Biografico degli Italiani states that this is contradicted by archival evidence and is likely a misreading of a similar name, "Bavosone d'Agobbio".

== Literary works ==
The authorship of literary works is a matter of dispute, with Paolo Bertolini in Dizionario Biografico degli Italiani (1971) giving credit to Bosone-father, and newer works pointing to Bosonello.

The authenticated poetic works include two chapters in terza rima, one of which is a compendium and commentary on Dante's Divine Comedy, and a few sonnets, one of which was written on the death of Dante.

Bosone is also the disputed author of the vernacular romance novel L'avventuroso Ciciliano. While some sources consider his authorship highly likely, modern scholarship generally describes the attribution as uncertain. The novel is notable as a possible source for a tale in Giovanni Boccaccio's The Decameron.

== Sources ==
- Bertolini, Paolo (1971). "Bosone da Gubbio". Dizionario Biografico degli Italiani (in Italian). Vol. 13. Rome: Istituto dell'Enciclopedia Italiana.
- Debenedetti, Santorre (1930). "BOSONE da Gubbio". Enciclopedia Italiana (in Italian). Rome: Istituto dell'Enciclopedia Italiana.
- "Bosone da Gubbio". Enciclopedia on line (in Italian). Istituto dell'Enciclopedia Italiana.
- "Bosóne da Gùbbio". Sapere.it (in Italian). De Agostini.
- Traina, Maria Rita (2020). "Immanuel, Bosone, Castruccio: note di lettura per i sonetti "anticommedia"". «I passi fidi»: studi in onore di Carlos López Cortezo (in Italian). Aracne editrice. pp. 497–512.
