= Valfabbrica =

- Comune
- Comune di Valfabbrica
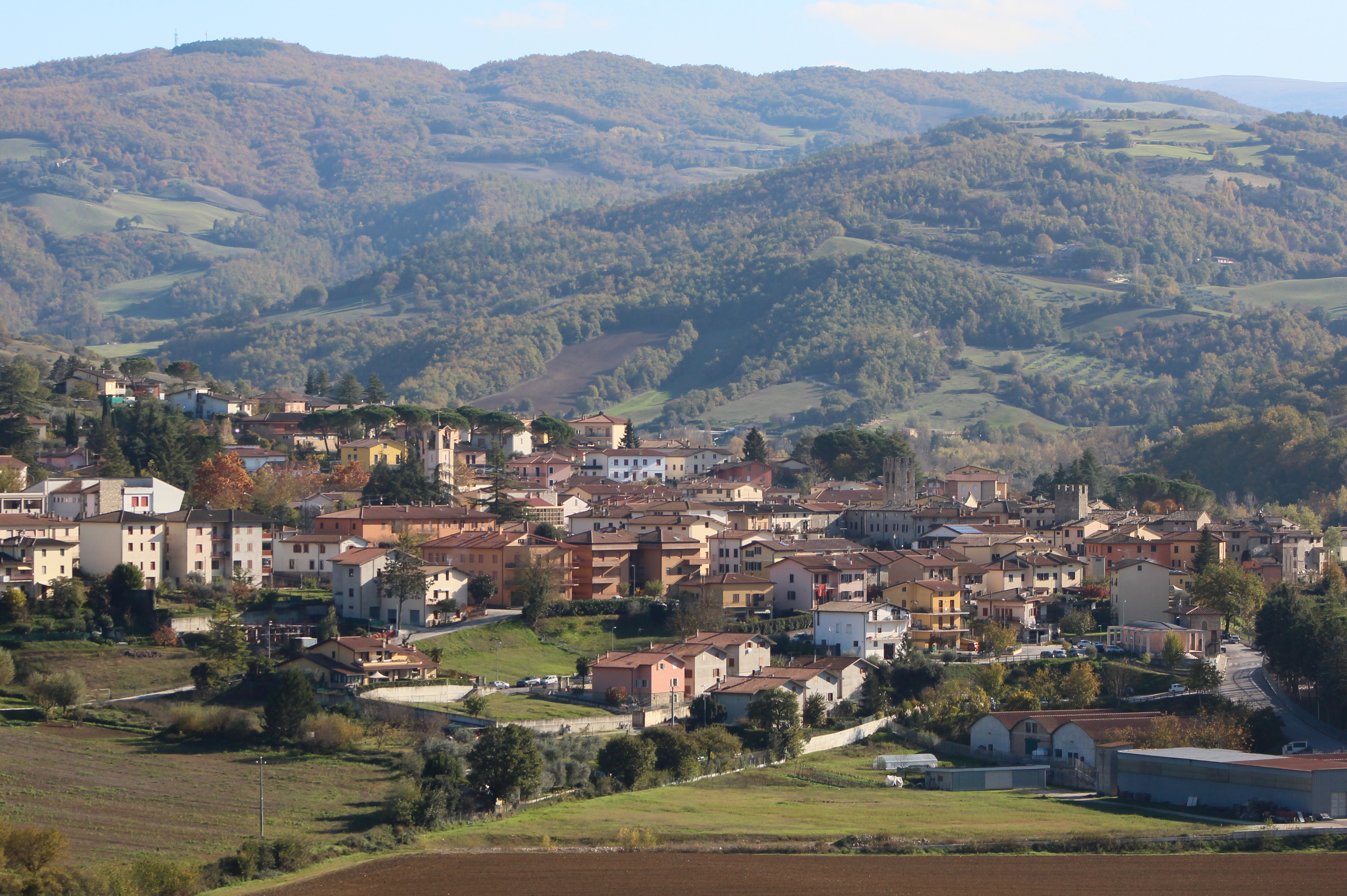
- View of Valfabbrica

- Coat of arms

- Location within Italy Location within Umbria
- Coordinates: 43.159424°N 12.601623°E
- Country: Italy
- Region: Umbria
- Province: Perugia (PG)

Government
  - Mayor: Ottavio Anastasi

Area
  - Total: 92.06 km^{2} (35.54 sq mi)
- Elevation: 289 m (948 ft)

Population (1 January 2025)
  - Total: 3,224
  - Density: 35.02/km^{2} (90.70/sq mi)
- Demonym: Valfabbrichesi
- Time zone: UTC+1 (CET)
  - Summer (DST): UTC+2 (CEST)
- Postal code: 06029
- Dialing code: 075
- Patron saint: St. Sebastian
- Saint day: January 20
- Website: Official website

Valfabbrica (Italian pronunciation: [valˈfabbrika]) is a comune (municipality) in the Province of Perugia in the Italian region Umbria, located about 20 km northeast of Perugia.

== Etymology ==
The name Valfabbrica derives from the term fabrica, referring to a structure used to facilitate crossing the Chiascio river, from which the settlement likely originated in the 8th century.

== History ==
The origins of the settlement date to the 8th century, when a community developed near a ford on the Chiascio river along the route between Assisi and Gubbio.

In the 9th century a Benedictine abbey was founded, accompanied by land reclamation and disputes with the local lords of Casacastalda and Giomici. A diploma of 820 issued by Louis the Pious confirmed the autonomy of both the abbey and the castle.

Imperial protection was granted in 1177 by Frederick I Barbarossa, placing the abbey in connection with the jurisdiction of Assisi. Between the 13th and 15th centuries the castle remained under the control of Assisi, with alternating phases of stability and difficulty.

Assisi formally took possession of the territory in 1516, governing it through appointed vicars. Control shifted in 1521 to the Duke of Urbino following the death of Pope Leo X. Between 1538 and 1574 statutes were compiled under Guidobaldo II della Rovere.

Administration passed to a papal bishop between 1624 and 1631. After the death of Francesco Maria II in 1631, the Papal State took control and absorbed the territory. From 1631 to 1734 the area remained under the jurisdiction of Urbino, dependent on Gubbio, before passing fully to direct papal rule in 1734.

In 1798 Valfabbrica was included in the rural canton of Perugia within the Department of Trasimeno. Under the papal reorganization of 1816 it became a subordinate district of Gubbio.

Autonomous municipal status was established in 1817 together with Poggio di Sotto, including the area of Casacastalda. In 1827 it was recognized as a local magistracy under the administration of Perugia.

In 1860 Valfabbrica was annexed to the Kingdom of Italy. The municipal territory was expanded in 1929 with the inclusion of Monteverde, Poggiomorico, Coccorano and Giomici.

In 1895 Valfabbrica had a population of 2,346 inhabitants.

== Geography ==
Valfabbrica is located about 20 kilometres (12 mi) from Perugia. It stands in a territory that is partly hilly and partly flat. The climate is described as temperate.

The surrounding valley is noted as fertile, and the Chiascio waters about half of the plain below the settlement. Another watercourse, the Rio, runs below the town. Within the territory is a wooded area known as Piaggia della Capra.

Valfabbrica borders the following municipalities: Assisi, Gualdo Tadino, Gubbio, Nocera Umbra, Perugia.

=== Subdivisions ===
The municipality includes the localities of Casacastalda, Collemincio, Giomici, Monteverde, Poggio San Dionisio, San Donato, Sospertole, Valfabbrica.

In 2021, 1,043 people lived in rural dispersed dwellings not assigned to any named locality. At the time, the most populous localities were Valfabbrica proper (1,489), and Casacastalda (549).

== Economy ==
In the late 19th century the surrounding land produced pasture, wheat, maize, olive oil, wine, and acorns, indicating a predominantly agricultural economy.

== Religion and culture ==
=== San Sebastiano ===
The Church of San Sebastiano was built in the 14th century within the castle of Valfabbrica, adjoining the perimeter walls. It contains five finely crafted Baroque altars. Behind the main altar is a 17th-century Crucifixion, flanked by Saint Sebastian and a Franciscan saint.

The church has three naves and an organ, and contains a painting attributed to the school of Perugino. A crucifix venerated as miraculous is preserved there.

=== Santa Maria Assunta ===
The church of Santa Maria Assunta formed part of the Benedictine abbey of Santa Maria in Vado Fabrice, documented in chronicles from 820, when the emperor Louis the Pious granted it autonomy. The abbey suffered repeated plundering during the war between Perugia and Assisi around 1200 and was left exposed following the destruction of the castle of Valfabbrica by Perugian forces. After the suppression of the monastery in 1359, the church served for centuries as the parish church of Valfabbrica.

Restorations over time preserved the original structure, which contains notable 14th-century Umbrian votive frescoes, some attributed to the circle of Cimabue. The monastic complex has since been converted into a private residence, while the church is still used for religious functions.

=== Madonna dell'Olmo ===
The Sanctuary of the Madonna dell'Olmo, dating to the 15th century, is located in the modern part of the town near the public park. Its interior is decorated with 15th-century frescoes, some attributed to Matteo da Gualdo.

The sanctuary stands on the site of a Marian apparition said to have occurred on 22 May 1484, when the Virgin appeared to a shepherd girl on an elm tree. The trunk of this tree is still preserved inside the church.

=== Secular buildings ===
The settlement features two towers, one used as a bell tower, while the other was used during festivities for the firing of celebratory mortars in the 19th century.

== Sports ==
=== Football ===
Gualdo Casacastalda is an Italian association football club, based in Gualdo Tadino and also in the homonymous frazione of the city. The club was founded in 2013 after the merger between A.S. Gualdo Calcio and A.S.D. Casacastalda. Its colors are red and yellow.

In the season 2011-12 A.S.D. Casacastalda, founded in 1984, was promoted for the first time, from Eccellenza Umbria to Serie D after playoffs.

== Notable people ==
Among the more prominent families recorded in the 19th century are the Micheli, Buschetti, Colasti, as well as the Italiani family.

Among those born in Valfabbrica is Fortunato Baldelli, a Catholic cardinal who served as Apostolic Nuncio to France.

== Twin towns ==
- Greußenheim, Germany
- Venelles, France
