= Expressionist Master of Santa Chiara =

Italian painter

The Expressionist Master of Santa Chiara was an Umbrian painter active between about 1290 and around 1330. He has been identified as one of Giotto's principal followers; some contend that his hand may be identified in a series of frescos attributed to Giotto in the Basilica of San Francesco d'Assisi. Among the surviving works attributed to him are a set of processional crucifixes, including one in the Cleveland Museum of Art.
