= ASD Gualdo Casacastalda =

Italian football club

Gualdo Casacastalda
- Full name: Associazione Sportiva; Gualdo Casacastalda
- Founded: 2013
- Ground: Stadio Carlo Angelo Luzi, Gualdo Tadino, Italy
- Capacity: 4,100
- League: Prima Categoria Umbria
- 2022–23: Promozione Umbria A, 17th (relegated)
Home colours	Away colours

Associazione Sportiva Gualdo Casacastalda is an Italian association football club, based in Gualdo Tadino, Umbria and also representing Casacastalda, a frazione of Valfabbrica, Umbria. The club currently plays in Prima Categoria Umbria.

== History ==
=== Gualdo Casacastalda ===
The club was founded in 2013 after the merger between A.S. Gualdo Calcio and A.S.D. Casacastalda.

During the second half of the 2012–2013 season, the idea of a merger between Gualdo, playing in Eccellenza at the time, and Casacastalda, playing in Serie D, began to grow. The two companies are a few km away, and the proponent of the idea was Matteo Minelli, Gualdese entrepreneur and honorary president of the Casacastalda. The initiative, carried out by the two companies with the support of the respective municipalities, leads to the birth of the new Associazione Sportiva GualdoCasacastalda officially presented on 11 July 2013. The new company uses the old sports title of Casacastalda, and enrolled in the Serie D.

=== Before the merger ===
==== Gualdo Calcio ====
The club was founded in 1920 as Società Sportiva Gualdo and made several appearances in professional football, reaching the Serie C1 promotion playoffs twice, in 1995 and 1998.

Former Casacastalda logo

==== Casacastalda ====
The club was founded in 1984.

In the season 2011–12 the team was promoted for the first time, from Eccellenza Umbria to Serie D after playoffs.

== Colors and badge ==
The color of the home shirt is red (in representation of Gualdo), while that of the away is yellow (in representation of Casacastalda).

== Non-playing staff ==
- Head coach, Roberto Balducci
- Fitness coach, Antonio Macrì
