= Giuliano Presutti =

Italian painter

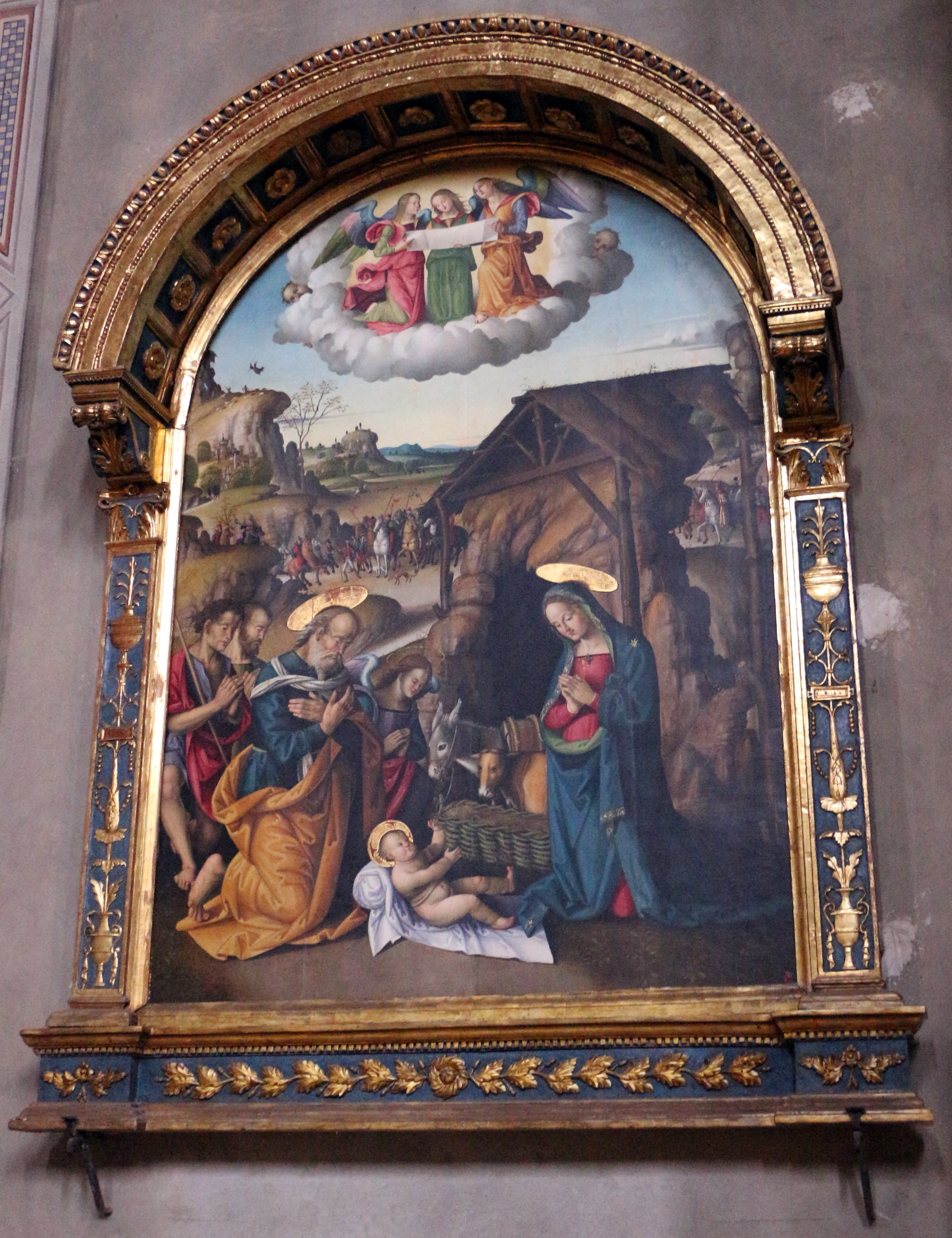
Nativity, Duomo of Gubbio

Giuliano Presutti or Persciutti or Presciutti (active, 1490 in Fano – 1557 in Ancona) was an Italian painter of the Renaissance period, active in Marche and Umbria.

He was a follower of either Antonio Solario or Vittore Crivelli, although he was also strongly influenced by the Early Renaissance school of Umbria, including Perugino, Giovanni Santi and Timoteo Viti . Presutti is reported to have completed a Glory of Mary Magdalen (1523), started by Viti, for the Cathedral of Gubbio. He painted an altarpiece of Comunione degli Apostoli (circa 1538–1546) in San Domenico in Gubbio that was restored in 2010. So from 1515 to 1527 we can place an intense activity in Gubbio.
