= Santa Maria della Piaggiola =

Roman Catholic church in Italy

Santa Maria della Piaggiola is a Baroque style, Roman Catholic church just outside Porta Vittoria in the town of Gubbio, region of Umbria, in Italy.

== History ==
The church was built at the site of an ancient chapel dedicated to the Madonna. The small church we see today was consecrated in 1625 by the Confraternity del Gonfalone and of San Francesco di Paola. The interior was decorated (1647-1659) with stucco, including statuary by Palmerino Allegrucci (1644), the brothers Guidangeli of Pesaro (1647), and Francesco Caminoni (1659). The main altar has a fresco from the chapel, painted by Ottaviano Nelli. Another altarpiece is also a detached fresco, depicting the Resurrection of Christ by Jacopo Bedi. The church also has paintings by Giovanni Battista Michelini, Francesco Allegrini da Gubbio, Domenico di Cecco (Maria e San Pietro Piangenti 1444), Ventura Magi (Saint Teresa), Giovanni Battista Mercati (Saints Ludovico and Francis), Rutilio Manetti (Birth of Mary and Presentation at Temple), and Pietro Paolo Tamburini (ceiling).
