= San Pietro, Gubbio =

Ancient Roman Catholic church in Italy

Coordinates: 43.348926°N 12.580490°E

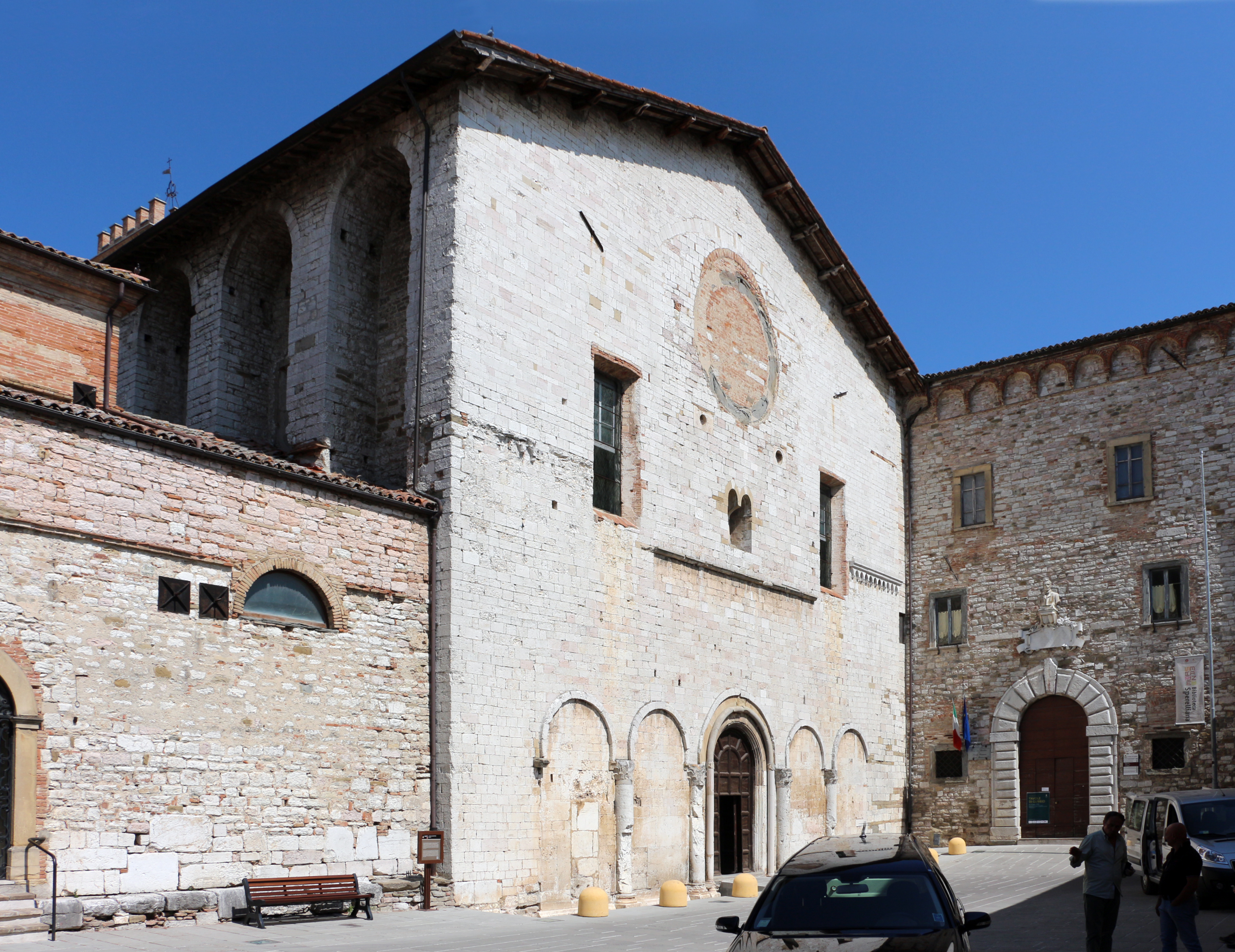
Facade of the church of San Pietro

San Pietro is an ancient Roman Catholic church and former monastery located on piazza San Pietro in central Gubbio, region of Umbria, in Italy. The church which displays architectural elements from many centuries, from Romanesque to the Renaissance, as well as housing prominent artworks; the monastery now houses the civic Biblioteca Comunale Sperelliana.

== History ==
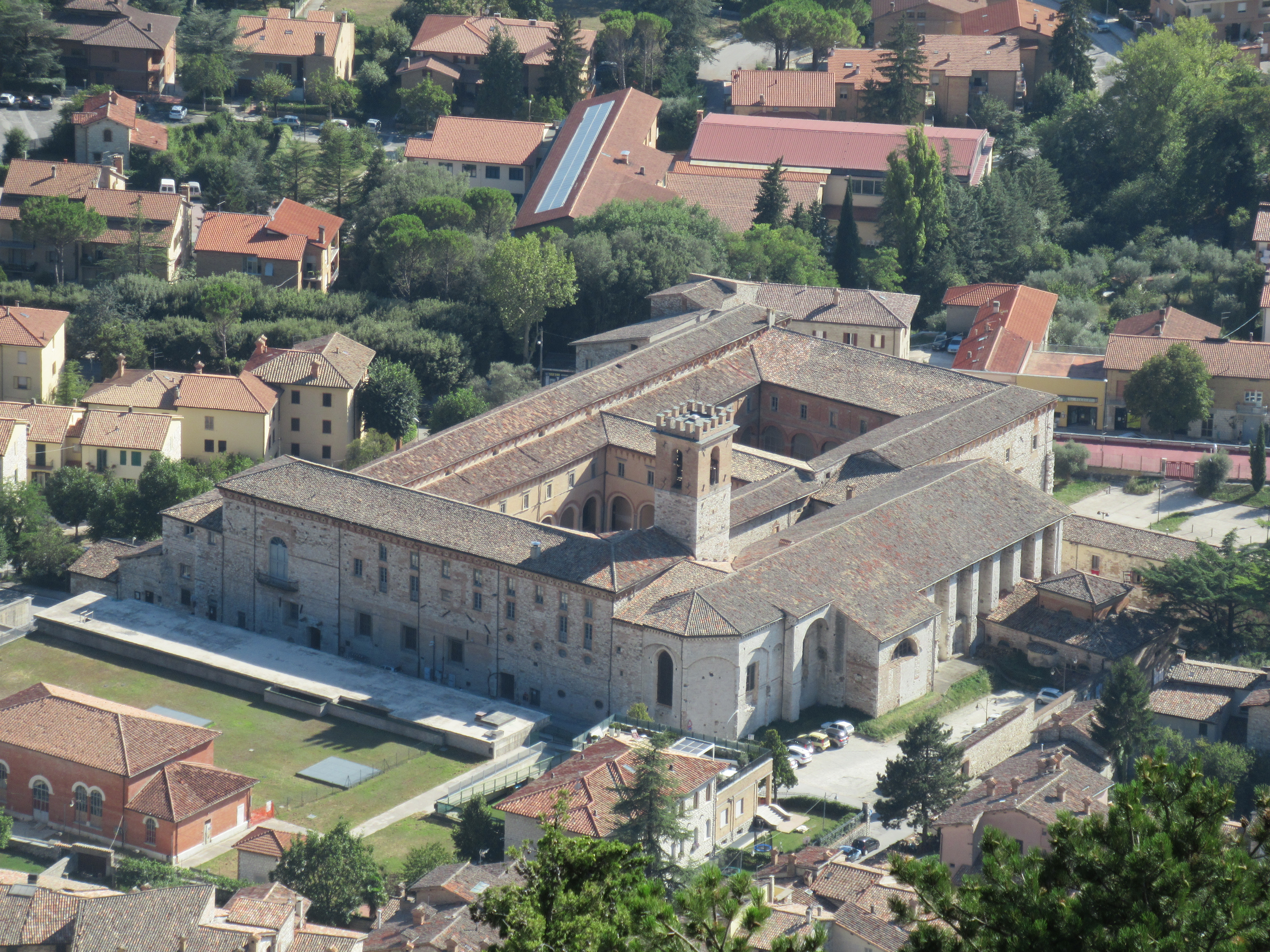
Aerial view of monastery (left) and church (right) with the belltower rising at the corner between the crossing and the apse of the church.

Some traditions hold that the church at this site was present from the 8th century, but documents only affirm that by the 11th century, a prominent church and Benedictine monastery were functioning. In a documents regarding Gubbio from 1163, emperor Barbarossa mentions an Offredo, the Ghibelline abbot of the monastery of St Peter.

The monastery was initially linked to the Abbey at Monte Cassino, and by the 12th-century appeared to be the second largest church in town. In 1521, pope Leo X expelled the Benedictines and replaced them with the monks from the Olivetan monastery of San Benedetto fuori della mura. In turn, in the 19th-century pope Gregory XVI replace the Olivetans with Camaldolese monks. The monastery was suppressed and the monks expelled by circa 1860. For some decades portions of the monastery were used by the prefecture and a school, and then to constitute a male orphanage. The properties were turned over to the city civic government. In 2010, the monastery, which was rebuilt in the 16th century, became the host of the civic library.

It is presumed that the South-East-facing facade arcade of 5 arches: the entrance portal and 4 arches flanked by short columns, was likely the portico of an older Romanesque church. The damaged Corinthian capitals are likely spolia. In the 13th century the church front was moved forward and this portico was kept as part of the new facade. This white stone brick facade has a small central mullioned window above the portal and a large round window superiorly closed now with brick, and two flanking tall rectangular windows added in the 16th century. Along the exterior, slender vertical buttresses protrude from the walls of the church, including at the polygonal apse. The square merlionated belltower is embedded in the monastic buildings on the right flank of the church.

The church interior has a single nave with rounded arches. The main organ was built (1689) by V. Beltrami, and decorated by Antonio and Giambattista Maffei. The main altar was built by Domenico Valli (1668-1738). The choir was sculpted by Giuseppe De’ Santi and Carlo Magistretti. The sacristy has some elegantly carved armoires and engraved oaken doors carved by Giuseppe Belli. The ceiling is frescoed by Francesco Vittori.

The first altarpiece on the left upon entering the church depicts a Sant'Ubaldo by Bernardino Brozzi; the second, a St Sebastian by Virgilio Nucci; the third, a St Michael Archangel commissioned by the Franciarini family from the painter Francesco Allegrini; the fourth, a Ste Geltrude by Giovanni Odazzi; and the 5th, a Santa Francesca Romana with frescoes also by Nucci. The crossing has paintings of the Deposition by Giuseppe Nicola Nasini. He also painted two works in the choir: the Conversion of Saul and a St Peter rescued from the Sea.

The crossing on the right has a main altarpiece depicting the Glory of St Romuald by Agostino Tofanelli; Filippo Vittori painted the flaking works depicting the encounters of St Romuald with St Boniface and Romuald with Emperor Otto. The altars on the right depict a Nativity by Raffaellino del Colle and some depictions of the Lives of Saints Placidus and Maurus (5th altarpiece on right); a Visitation by Giannicola di Paolo, a Madonna of Loreto by Giovanni Battista Michelini, a depiction of the Blessed Bernardo Tolomei by Nasini; and a Martyrdom of St Bartholemew by Rutilio Manetti.
