= Bernardino di Nanni =

Italian painter

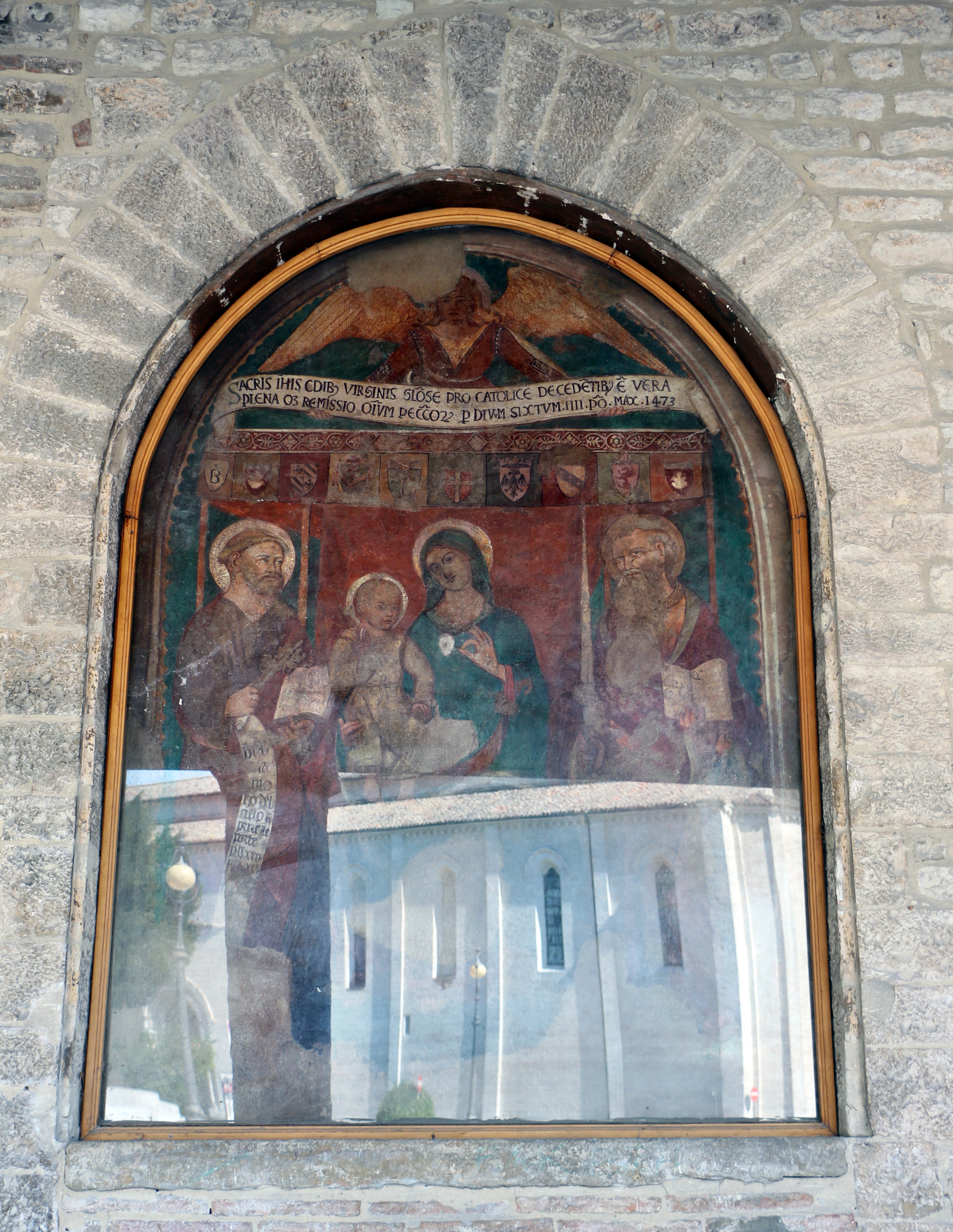
Madonna between Saints Peter and Paul, 1473

Bernardino Di Nani (active 15th to 16th century) was an Italian painter of the Renaissance, active in Gubbio.

== Biography ==
He was a pupil of Domenico Di Cecco di Baldi in Gubbio. He painted frescoes of God the father (above) and Virgin and Child with Saints Giacomo, Macario, Filippo and Bernardino (1505) in the side niches of the Church of St Michael Archangel of Gavalli, near Monteleone. He also painted for the confraternities of Santa Maria de Laici and Santa Maria della Foce in Gubbio. One of his pupils was Pietro Paolo Baldinacci. Many of his frescoes have deteriorated.
