= DeNucci =

DeNucci is an Italian surname. Notable people with the surname include:

- A. Joseph DeNucci (1939–2017), American boxer and politician
- Dominic DeNucci (1932–2021), Italian-American wrestler

== See also ==
- Nucci
- DiNucci
