= Pietro Paolo Baldinacci =

Italian painter

Pietro Paolo Baldinacci (active first half of 16th century) was an Italian painter of the Renaissance, active in Gubbio.

== Biography ==
He was a pupil of Bernardino di Nanni in Gubbio. He painted in a style resembling Sinibaldo Ibi and Orlando Merlini. The banner painting of St Ubaldo, St Peter Martyr, and the Cross in the church of Santa Croce della Foce in Gubbio is attributed to Baldinacci. Among his pupils was the painter of Gubbio, Benedetto Nucci.
