= Eremo di Sant'Ambrogio =

Monastery in Gubbio, Italy

Coordinates: 43.35671°N 12.57605°E

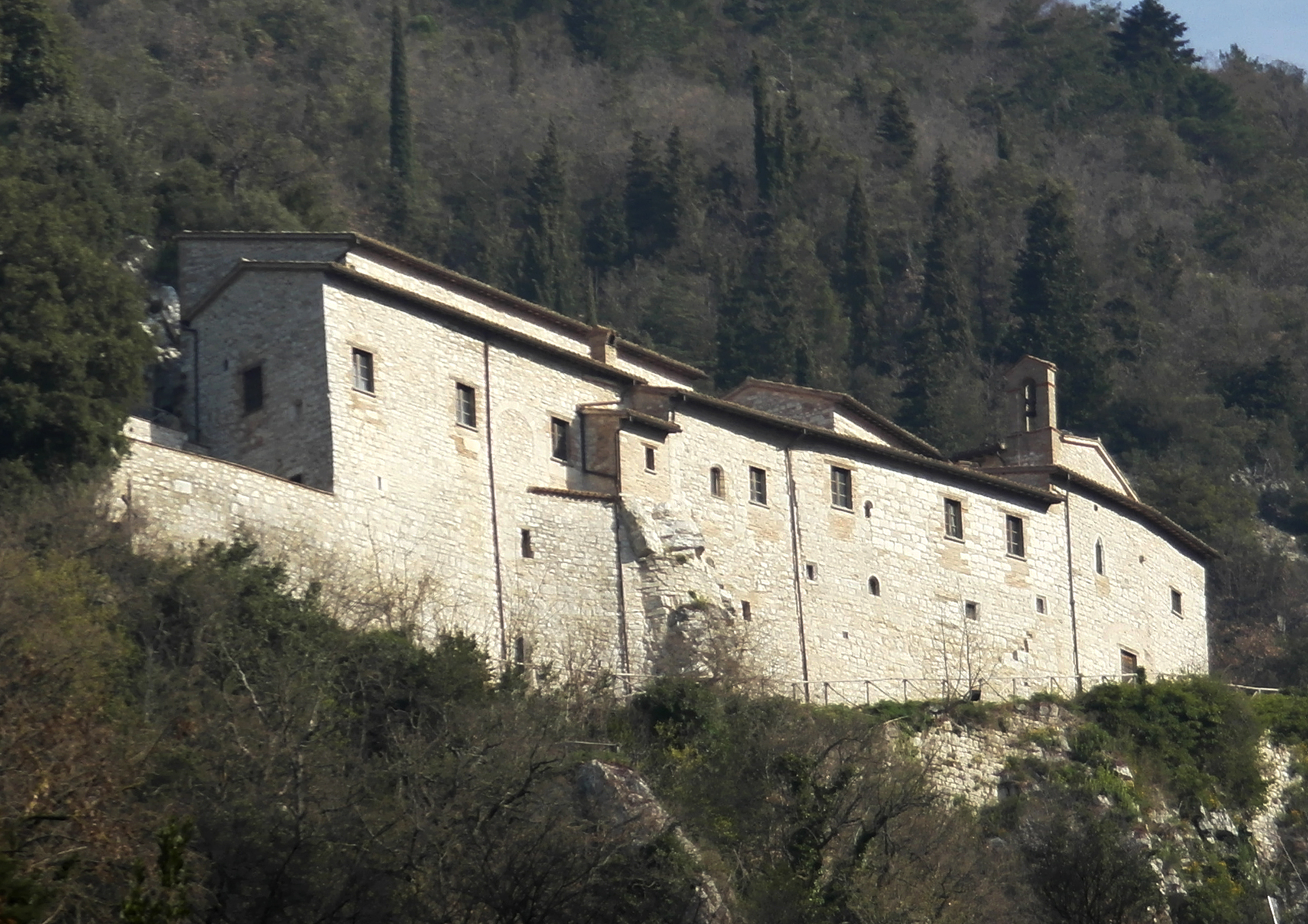
Church and hermitage of Sant'Ambrogio

The Monastero or Eremo di Sant'Ambrogio (Monastery or Hermitage of St Ambrose) is a 14th-century Roman Catholic church and monastery located on Via Guido Bonarelli #5 nestled on high slopes of Monte Foce (Monte Calvo), north of Gubbio, region of Umbria, in Italy. It was initially founded as a rustic Franciscan hermitage following Augustinian rules, outside the city walls of Gubbio.

== History ==
Tradition holds that niches in the stony mountainside attracted hermits in early medieval times, but by 1331, a number of followers resided here in a priory, outside of the town to pursue contemplative life of prayer. By 1342 Bishop Pietro Gabrielli of Gubbio elevated the site to a monastery, under the Augustinian rule. In 1419, by orders of Pope Martin V, the monastery was joined to that of San Salvatore in Bologna, and assigned to the order of Canons Regular. In 1430, this order was expanded with the canons from Santa Maria al Reno; and in 1445, under Pope Callixtus III, the cannons of San Secondo were transferred here.

The monastery once housed the Blessed Arcangelo Canetoli (c. 1460–1513), and his body is putatively preserved above the main altar/sarcophagus, made of polychrome marble and with glass windows inside the small church. While alive, and after his death, the association of Canetoli with this monastery made the site a place of pilgrimage. In addition, this church also holds the remains of two other famous ecclesiasts from Gubbio, the monk Blessed Francesco Nanni and the Bishop of Gubbio, and humanist scholar, Agostino Steuco (1497 – 1548)

The church initially erected in the 14th century was refurbished in the 17th-century. A chapel in the grotto was putatively used by Canetoli for prayer had a small fresco attributed to Ottaviano Nelli, it was detached and is now housed in the canonry of San Secondo. The church has two altarpieces, a canvas by Annibale Beni (1764-1845) depicting the Standing Blessed Canetoli in prayer (wearing a white tunic). A second altarpiece depicts the St Ambrose baptizes St Augustine (1550) by Benedetto Nucci. The work was stolen in 1984, but recovered from the shop of an antiquarian. In the sacristy are the remains of a 14th-century fresco attributed to Guido Palmerucci or his followers.
