= Nucci =

Nucci is an Italian surname. Notable people with the surname include:

- Avanzino Nucci (Citta di Castello, 1552–1629), Italian painter
- Benedetto Nucci (Cagli, 1515–1587), Italian painter
- Carlo Alberto Nucci, Italian academic
- Colette Nucci (1950–2023), French actress and theatre directress
- Danny Nucci, American actor
- John A. Nucci, senior vice president of External Affairs at Suffolk University
- Laura Nucci (1913–1994), Italian film actress
- Leo Nucci, Italian operatic tenor
- Ludovico Nucci, Italian painter, active circa 1592
- Virgilio Nucci (1545–1620), Italian painter

== See also ==
- DiNucci
