= Bernardino Brozzi =

Italian painter

Bernardino Brozzi (1555–1617) was an Italian painter of the late Renaissance period.

He was a pupil of Benedetto Nucci. He was active in Gubbio, where he painted for the churches of the Battilani, San Giuliano, Sant'Agostino, and San Pietro. He died from a fall from scaffolding.
