= Antonio Zabelli =

Italian painter

Antonio Zabelli (or Zabaglio) (1742-1796) was an Italian engraver born in Florence. He engraved several portraits for the collection published by Francesco Allegrini at Florence, in 1762; and some plates after the principal pictures at Naples: among them Mary Magdalene after Guercino; Flight to Egypt and Meeting of Christ and St. John after Guido Reni; and Three Marys at the Tomb of Christ after Annibale Carracci.
