= Domenico Di Cecco =

Domenico di Cecco may refer to:

- Domenico Di Cecco (footballer) (born 1983), Italian footballer
- Domenico di Cecco, 15th-century Italian painter
