= Brunori =

Brunori is an Italian surname. Notable people with the surname include:

- Brunori Sas (born Dario Brunori; 1977), Italian singer
- Federigo Brunori (1566–1649), Italian painter
- Matteo Brunori (born 1994), Italian footballer
- Veronica Brunori (born 2000), Italian karateka
