= San Giacomo, Foligno =

Church building in Foligno, Italy

Coordinates: 42.9588°N 12.7025°E

San Giacomo is a Gothic-style, Roman Catholic church located at the Piazza San Giacomo, Foligno, Italy.

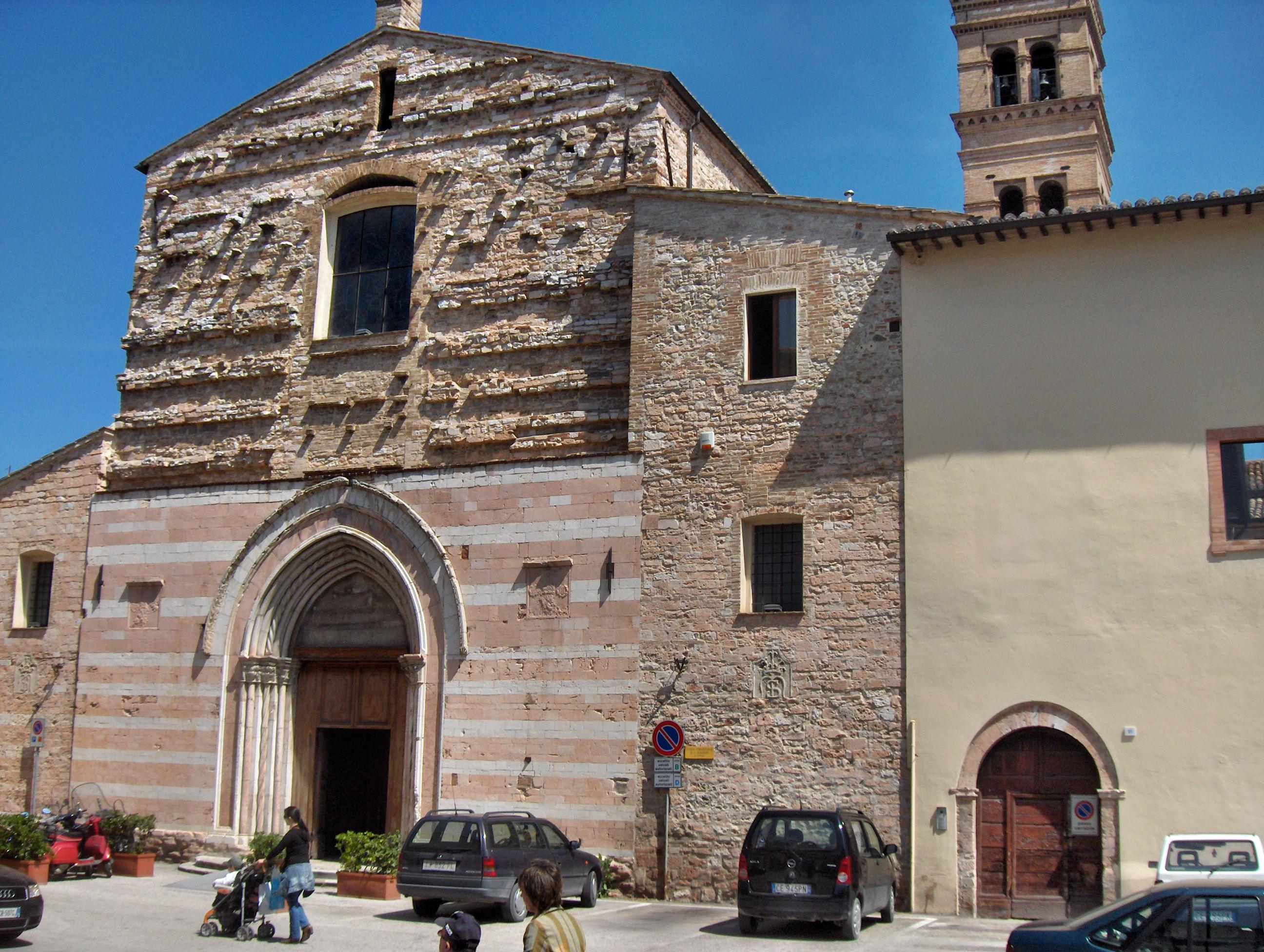
Church of San Giacomo

== History ==
The site on which the church was built in 1402 was originally the site of an old hospice, dedicated to St. James, as attested in a document of Pope Innocent III in 1210. The hospice and its chapel were passed on the Servite Order by bishop Paperone de' Paperoni in 1273. They transformed the main hall of the hospice into a church. The present church was built in 1402 under Prior Filippo di Massiolo da Foligno, incorporating the older church at its crossing. This was probably largely financed by Ugolino III Trinci, the lord of Foligno. The church was modified in the 17th and 18th centuries. The earthquake of 1997 badly damaged the church; restoration of the church was finished in 2000.

The Servite Order remained with a small presence in Foligno until 1994 but their convent had been closed in 1860.

The Gothic façade with its white and red bands and large window has remained unfinished. One enters the church through a beautiful ogival portal. Two inscriptions flank the portal, one records the enlargement of the church in 1402, while the other shows the arms of the Servites.

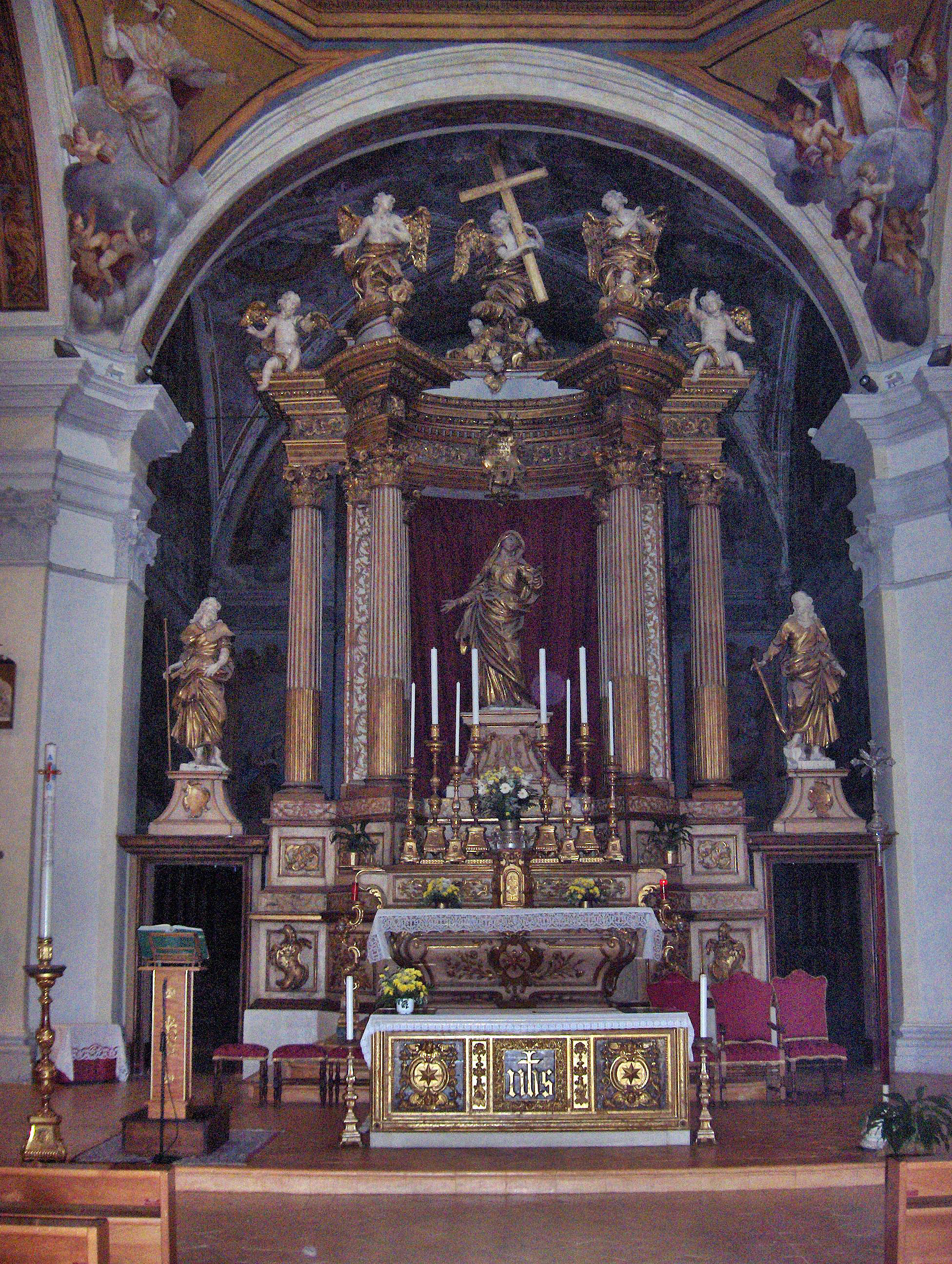
Main altar

The lower part of the campanile was built at the same time, but the upper part was rebuilt in the 17th century.

The three-naved interior was redecorated in Baroque style during the period 1721-1729. The presbytery was rebuilt by the bishop Luca Cibo. He also probably added the cupola around 1490. The main altar stands before a construction with five winged angels on top of the gilded columns. The three statues behind the altar represent the Grieving Madonna flanked by the apostles James the Great and James the Less and were sculpted by Antonio Calcioni in 1702.

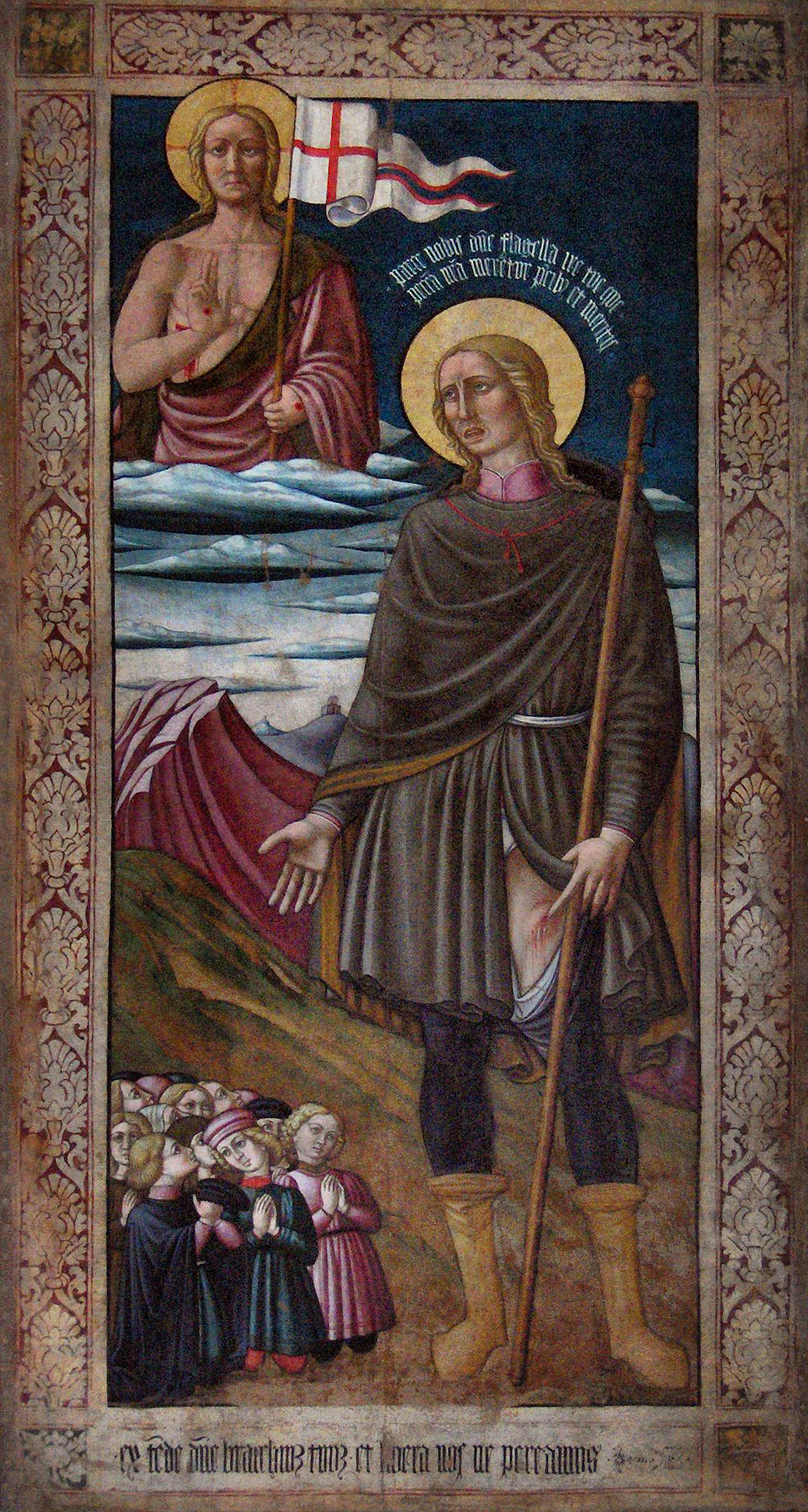
Banner of "St. Roch and the Redeemer"

There are several works of art over the side altars. The first side altar on the left is dedicated to St. Roche and was constructed in the period 1480-1485 to thank the saint for protecting the city during the plague that affected the city in 1476-81. The processional banner over the altar, attributed to Pierantonio Mezzastris, depicts St. Roch commending the people of Foligno to the Redeemer. It was first used in procession in 1481.

Adjoining the church is a cloister with two arcades on top of each other. The lower arcade dates from 1442-1454, while the upper arcade is an addition from the 17th century. The lunettes of the lower arcade show the damaged frescoes by Giovan Battista Michelini, Il Folignate depicting scenes from the life of San Filippo Benizi (1611), a canonized general superior of the Servites. The Chapter Room retains the original windows of the ancient hospice. The sacristy of the church stands on the same spot as the chapel of the old hospice.
