= Jacopo Bedi =

Italian painter

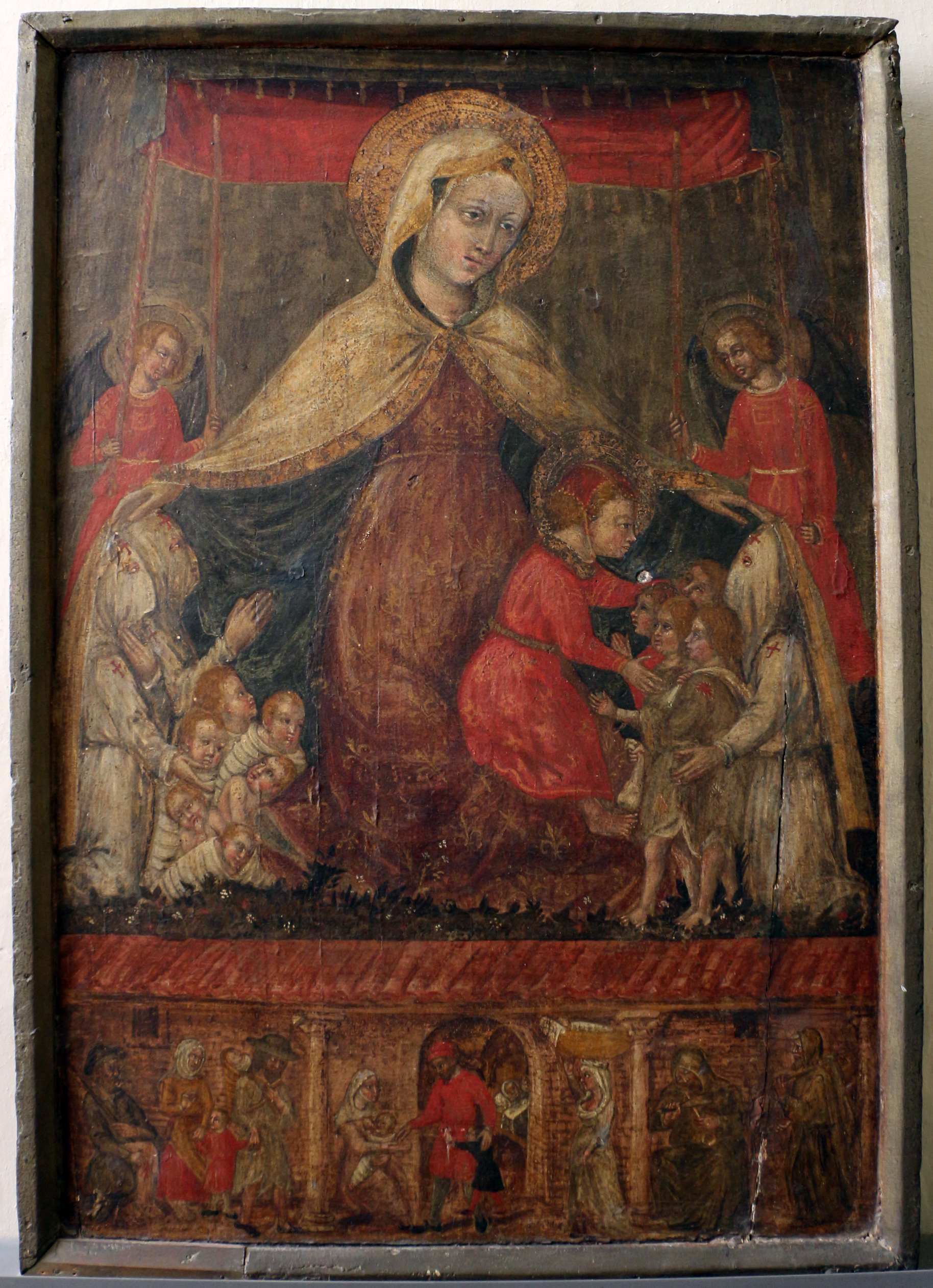
Madonna della misericordia, circa 1450

Jacopo Bedi, also known by Giacomo di Bedo di Benedetto (active 1432 – 1458) was an Italian painter of the Quattrocento.

== Biography ==
He was born in Gubbio, and active there, where he was felt to be a pupil of Ottaviano Nelli. There is one signed work by him, frescoes depicting the Life of St Sebastian for the Panfili Chapel in the cemetery of San Secondo in Gubbio from 1458.
