= Federigo Brunori =

Italian painter

Federigo or Federico Brunori or il Brunorino (1566–1649) was an Italian painter, active mainly in Gubbio.

== Biography ==
He was a pupil of Felice Damiani. He was prolific. His portraits are natural, often clothed in foreign drapery. He may have modeled some compositions on prints of Albrecht Dürer. Along with Pier Angelo Basili, he helped fresco the presbytery of the church of Santa Croce della Foce in Gubbio. He also completed portraits for the Florentine gallery of artists. Vincenzo Chiappini was his pupil.
