= Pier Angelo Basili =

Italian painter

Pier Angelo Basili (after 1550 – 1604) was an Italian painter of the 16th century Renaissance period. He was born in Gubbio after 1550, and trained with Felice Damiani and Cristoforo Roncalli. He painted in fresco for the cloister of Sant Tibaldo in Gubbio and an oil canvas of Christ preaching for the church of San Marziale. During 1601–1602, he painted frescoes alongside Federico Brunorino in the presbytery of the church of Santa Croce in Gubbio.
