= Arcangelo Canetoli =

Italian Roman Catholic priest

Blessed Arcangelo Canetoli
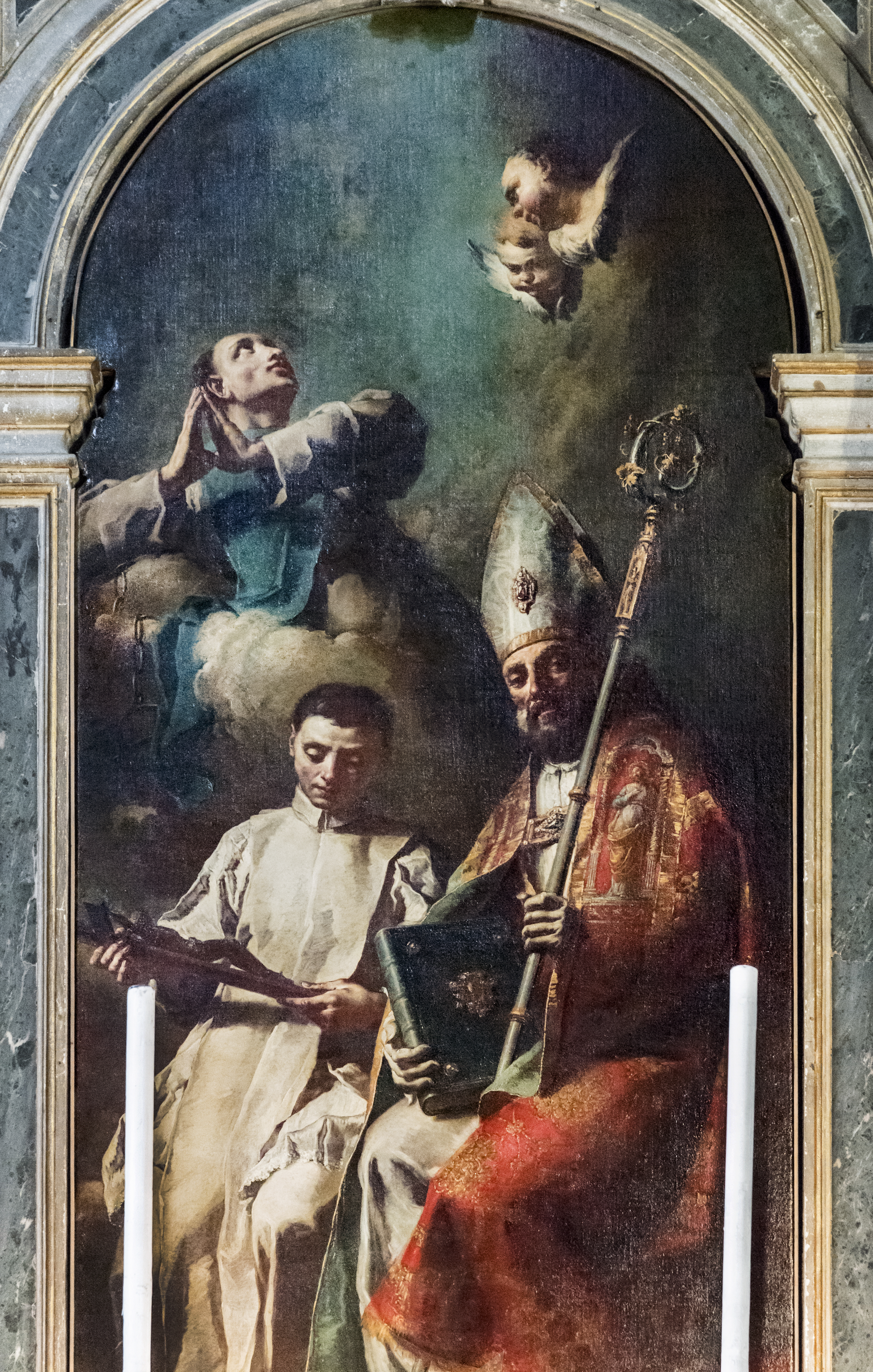
- Blessed Arcangelo Canetoli between St Nicholas and St Leonard painted by GB Piazzetta and Domenico Maggiotto for the church of San Salvatore, Venice

Priest
- Born: 1460; Bologna, Papal States
- Died: 16 April 1513 (aged 53); Gubbio, Papal States
- Venerated in: Roman Catholic Church
- Beatified: 2 October 1748, Saint Peter's Basilica, Papal States by Pope Benedict XIV
- Feast: 16 April

Arcangelo Canetoli (1460 - 16 April 1513) was an Italian Roman Catholic priest and a canon regular of Santa Maria di Reno. Canetoli escaped the massacre of his parents and brothers who were killed in Bologna during a political feud and embraced the religious life not long after where he became noted to the point he turned down repeated offers to serve as the Archbishop of Bologna and the Archbishop of Florence.

His beatification received full approval on 2 October 1748 after Pope Benedict XIV approved the late priest's local 'cultus' - or popular devotion.

== Life ==
Arcangelo Canetoli was born in Bologna in 1460 to nobles.

All his family was massacred during his childhood during a political feud with the House of Bentivoglio. The Canetoli house had been accused of the death of Annibale Bentivoglio in an apparent move that ignited the longstanding feud between the two houses. He soon after entered the canons regular of Santa Maria di Reno (an order that originated from Venice) on 29 September 1484 and was later ordained to the priesthood in 1498. Canetoli lived at the Eremo di Sant'Ambrogio, a mountainside monastery in Gubbio from 1498 after being made a priest and would remain there for the rest of his life; he requested this transfer himself. He repeated his refusals to be appointed as the Archbishop of Bologna. He became the vicar of the San Daniele in Monte convent in Padua in 1505 and held the position until 1509.

Canetoli predicted that Cardinal Giovanni de' Medici would be elected as pope sometime soon, and when this cardinal became Pope Leo X in 1513, Leo's brother Giuliano de' Medici summoned Canetoli to Florence in an attempt to persuade him to become the new Archbishop of Florence. Canetoli refused and returned to his convent.

Canetoli died on 16 April 1513 from an intense period of fever. His remains were interred in the convent that he resided in on 3 December 1513 and are putatively incorrupt.

== Beatification ==
His beatification received formal ratification on 2 October 1748 from Pope Benedict XIV after the latter confirmed that there existed a local 'cultus' - otherwise known as popular veneration - that endured since the late priest's death.
