= Madonna del Prato, Gubbio =

Church in Perugia province, Italy

Coordinates: 43°20′49.3″N 12°34′36.6″E

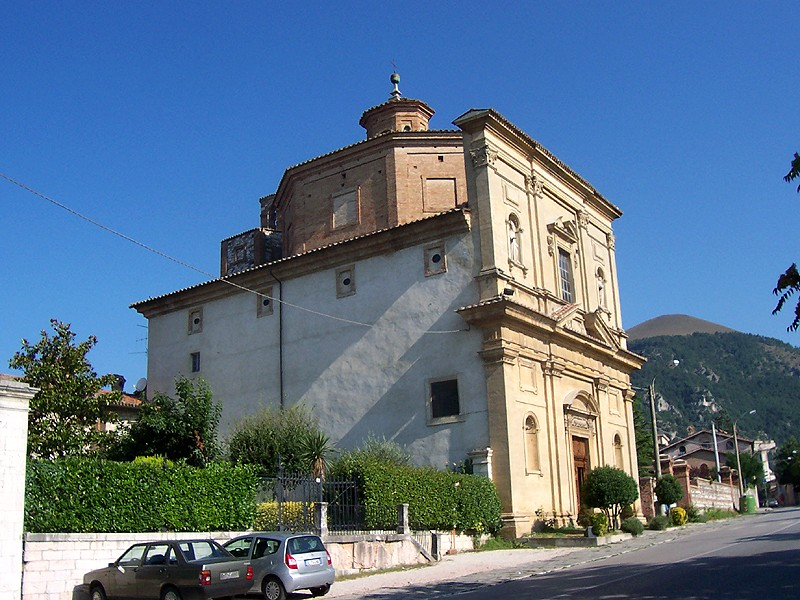
Madonna del Prato, Gubbio

The church of Madonna del Prato is a Baroque-style Roman Catholic church in Gubbio, Umbria region, Italy.

== History ==
The church construction began in 1662 to house an image of the Madonna del Prato that was held to be miraculous. The plain façade with two statues does not prepare the visitor for the interior, which is a near-replica of the interior space and ordering of San Carlino alle Quattro Fontane, one of the masterpieces of Baroque architecture in Rome, by Francesco Borromini. The architectural plan is attributed to Carlo Perugini, but there is evidence Borromini may have played a direct role. The dome, which in Rome is populated by geometric crosses, was frescoed by Francesco Allegrini and Louis Dorigny (1677–1678). The church also has altarpieces by Ciro Ferri, Gaetano Lapis, and Domenico Maria Viani.

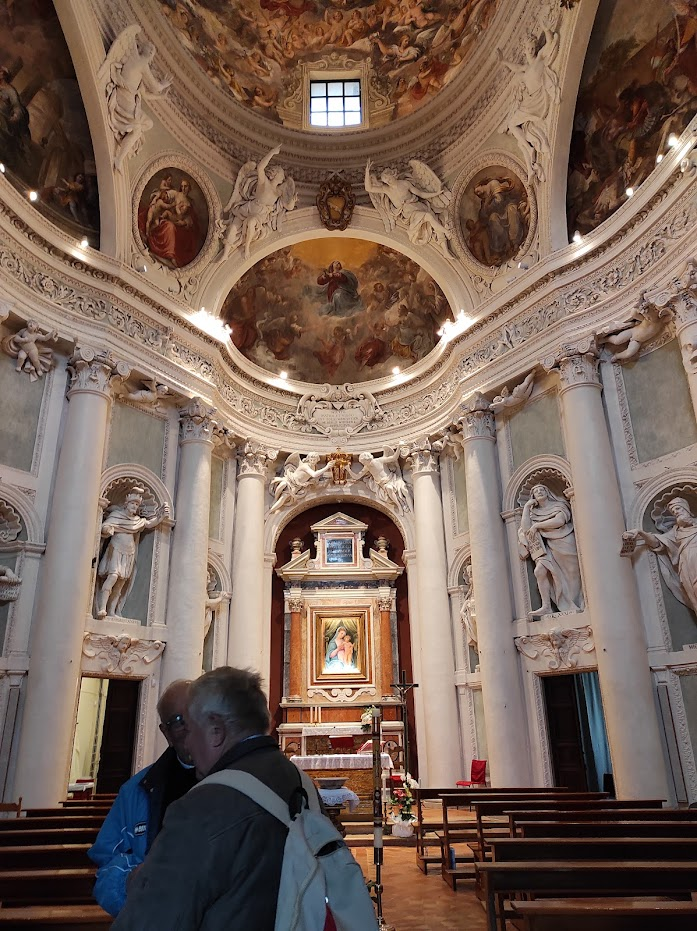

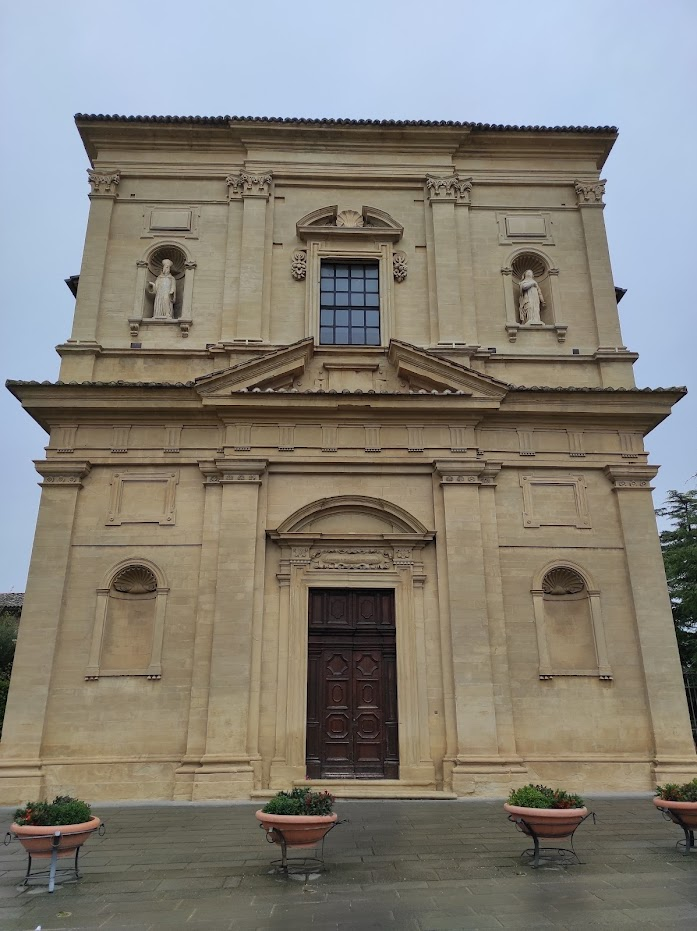

== See also ==
- 17th-century Western domes
