= Pietro Paolo Tamburini =

Italian painter (1594–1621)

Pietro Paolo Tamburini (1594 – 1621) was an Italian painter of the Baroque period.

He was a pupil of Federico Barocci. He was active in Perugia and Gubbio. In the latter, his native town, he painted a Visitation (1620) for the Sant'Ubaldo and for the church of Santa Maria della Piaggiola.
