= Giovanni Battista Michelini =

Italian painter

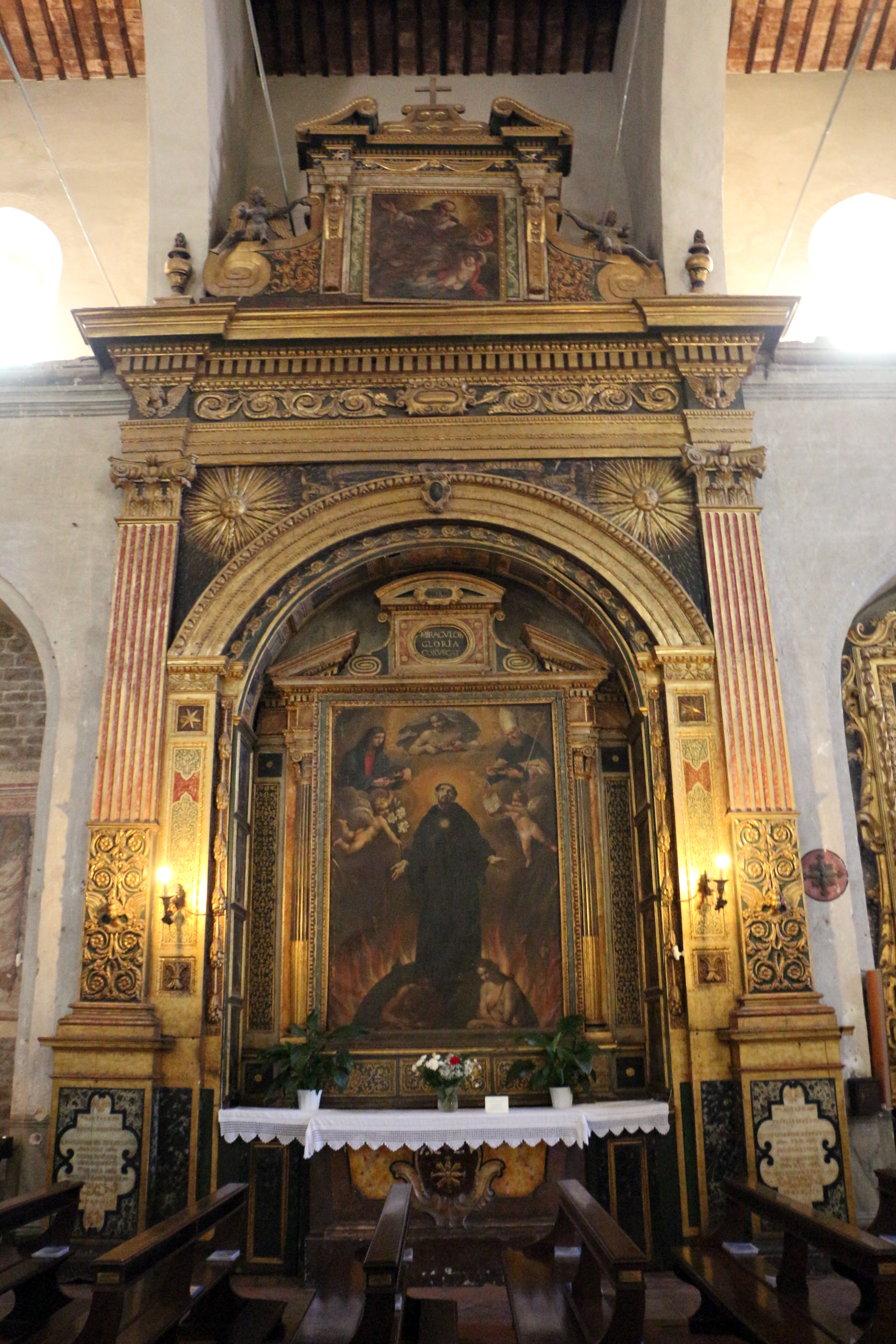
San Nicola da Tolentin, 1650 ca., Sant'Agostino (Gubbio)

Giovanni Battista Michelini (also called il Folignate) (1604–1655) was an Italian Baroque painter, active mainly in Foligno and Rome. He was born in Foligno, but became a pupil of Guido Reni. He painted mainly religious and mythological subjects.

== Known works ==
- Hall of Cupid, Hall of Apollo: two frescoed rooms in the Palazzo Pierantoni in Foligno
- The Foundation of Foligno: frescoed ceiling in the Palazzo De Comitibus, Foligno
- an ensemble of large allegorical frescoes, in the church of S. Filippo, Bevagna
- Madonna and Child with St. Elysius (oil on canvas): Foligno, church of San Giovanni Decollato
- Holy Family, St. Catherine, and an Immaculate Conception: all three works in Foligno, monastery of Santa Caterina
- Madonna and child with saints (oil on canvas): church of San Francesco della Pace, Gubbio
- Scenes from the life of San Filippo Benizi (damaged frescoes in the lower arcade of the cloister of the Church of San Giacomo (Foligno)
