= Felice Damiani =

Italian painter

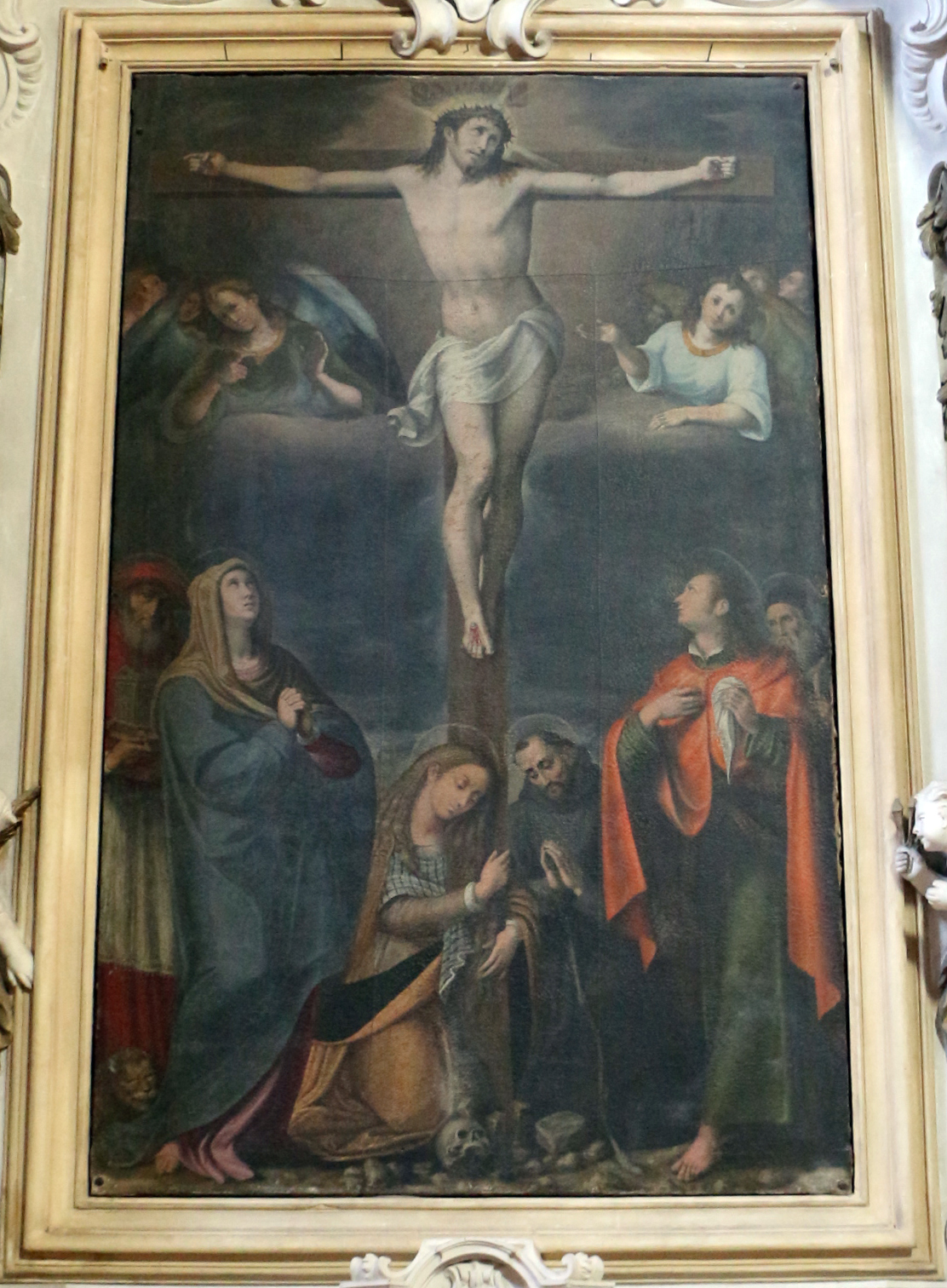
Crucifixion and saints, Sant'Agostino, Gubbio

Felice Damiani or Felice da Gubbio (1530–1608) was an Italian painter of the Late Renaissance or Mannerism period.

== Biography ==
He was a pupil of Benedetto Nucci in Gubbio. Because of his lively colouring, he was nicknamed the Paolo Veronese of Umbria He painted a Baptism of Sant'Agostino for the church of Sant'Agostino and an Adoration of the Magi (1603) for the church of San Domenico, Gubbio. He painted in the chapels of the Visitation and the Nativity (1593) of the church of Santa Maria de' Lumi in San Severino Marche. He painted a Martyrdom of St. Paul for a church in Recanati. He painted a strikingly genre-style Mane Nobiscum Domine ("Stay with us, Lord") now in the Palazzo Comunale in Cantiano. He painted a Sant' Alberto with Virgin, saints and donors for the Santuario Maria SS. delle Vergini in Macerata. He painted frescoes for the Castello Brancaleoni di Piobbico. He also painted altarpieces for the Sanctuary at Loreto. The painters Pier Angelo Basili, Federico Brunori from Gubbio, Cesare Pausi from Cagli, Urbano Doceschi from Cantiano, and Valeriano Vittori of Gualdo Tadino were his pupils.
