= Francesco Allegrini da Gubbio =

Italian painter

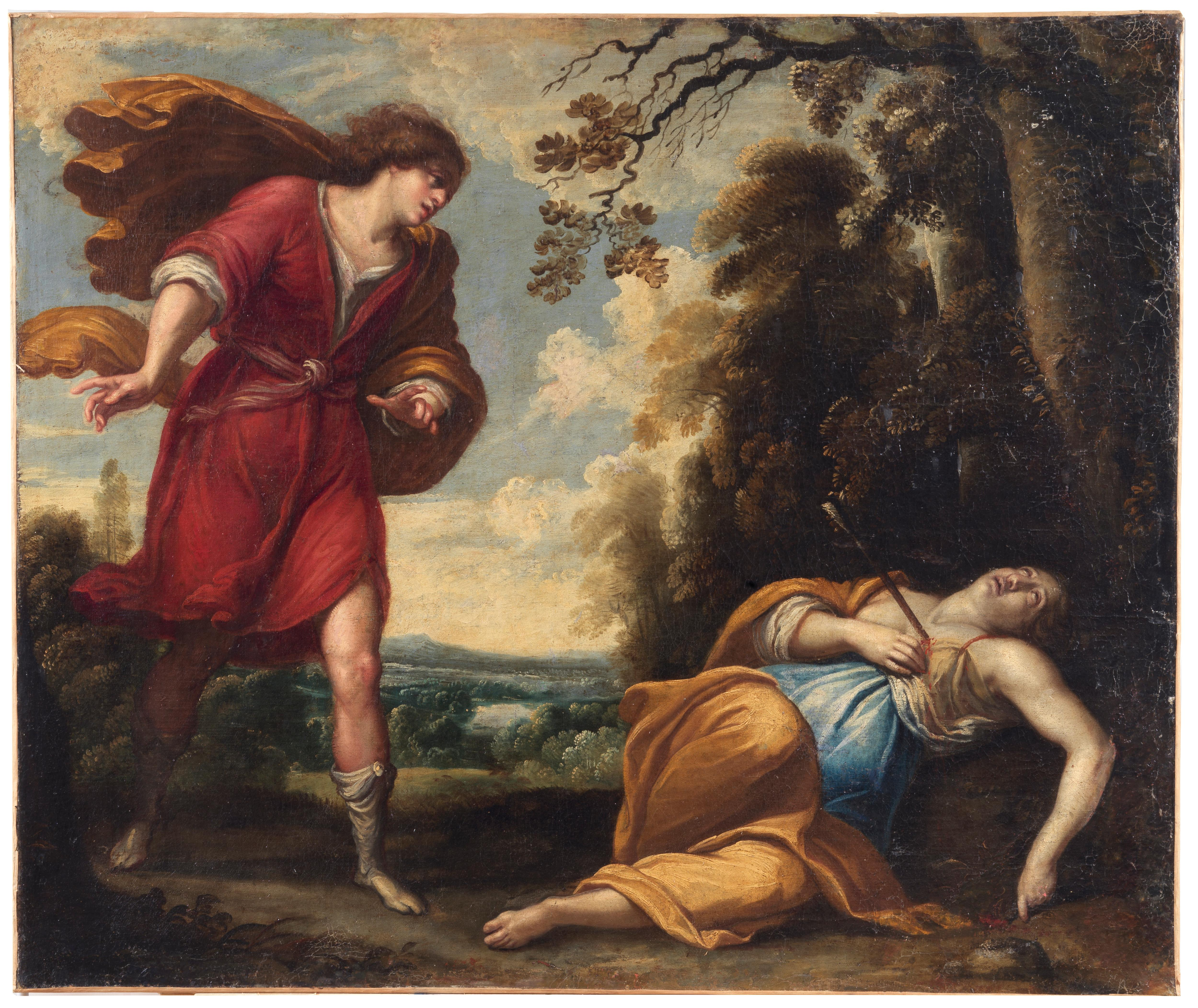
- Cephalus and Procris, Dorotheum, Vienna
- Born: Francesco Allegrini; 1587; Gubbio, Papal States
- Died: 21 July 1663 (aged 75–76); Rome, Papal States
- Education: Giuseppe Cesari
- Occupation: Painter
- Known for: Historical and religious painting
- Movement: Baroque

Francesco Allegrini da Gubbio (1587 – 21 July 1663) was an Italian painter of the Baroque period. He was active in Rome, Genoa, Savona, and Naples. His children, Flaminio and Angelica Allegrini, were also painters. Angelica painted a canvas for the church of San Francesco, Gubbio.

== Biography ==
Born in Gubbio, he was also called Francesco da Gubbio. His father, Flaminio Allegrini da Cantiano, was also a painter. A pupil of Giuseppe Cesari (Cavaliere d'Arpino), he was attracted early on by the art of Pietro da Cortona, although the full Baroque remained alien to him. The early sources state that Francesco worked in Savona Cathedral and in the Durazzo and Gavotti palaces in Genoa, yet it remains unclear whether these commissions should be attributed to him or to his father.

Francesco worked mostly in Rome, where many of his canvases and frescoes are preserved in churches and palaces. Around 1650 he executed the St. Catherine altarpiece in the church of Santi Domenico e Sisto, Rome. Between 1652 and 1654 he was working on frescoes in the Speralli Chapel in the cathedral at Gubbio. In 1653 he took part in an important project to decorate the church of San Marco Evangelista al Campidoglio, Rome, under the supervision of Cortona. The two canvases he painted there, St. Abdon and St. Sennen Yoked to the Cart of Emperor Decius and the Consecration of the Basilica of St. Mark, reveal the influence of Andrea Sacchi’s and Pier Francesco Mola’s neo-Venetian art.

At about the same time he painted the Scenes from the Old Testament in the Palazzo Pamphilj in Piazza Navona, Rome. Allegrini was admired as a battle painter, and his works in this genre include frescoes in the Palazzo Rospigliosi (c. 1655) and the Palazzo Altemps. Between 1659 and 1660 he produced what is perhaps his most important work, a cycle of three frescoes – the Battle of Muret, the Martyrdom of St. Peter of Verona and the Triumph of St. Thomas Aquinas – in the Palace of the Holy Office, Rome.

His last Roman commission was the series of frescoes depicting scenes from the Life of St. Alexander in the church of Santi Cosma e Damiano. He left Rome c. 1661 and settled in Gubbio, where he painted numerous altarpieces in a style that echoes Cortona, for example the Virgin and Child with Saints in Santa Croce della Foce (1668). His last works include the frescoes painted between 1674 and 1678 in the church of the Madonna del Prato. A short biography of Allegrini is included in Filippo Baldinucci's Notice of the Professors of Design, from Cimabue to now, from 1610–1670.

== Sources ==
- Hobbes, James R. (1849). Picture collector's manual adapted to the professional man, and the amateur. London: T&W Boone. p. 4.
- Lefevre, Renato (1968). "Appunti sugli Allegrini da Gubbio, pittori del Seicento". Studi Seicenteschi. 9: 127–55.
- Ciuferri, Paola (1977). "Una scheda su Francesco Allegrini". Ricerche di Storia dell'Arte. 6: 121–5.
- Zeri, Federico (1977). "Francesco Allegrini: Gli affreschi del Sant'Ufficio". Antologia di Belle Arti. 1/3: 266–70.
- Gregori, Mina; Schleier, Erich, eds. (1988). La pittura in Italia: Il Seicento. Vol. 2. Milan: Electa. p. 612.
