= DiNucci =

DiNucci or Dinucci is an Italian surname. Notable people with the surname include:

- Ben DiNucci (born 1996), American football player
- Darcy DiNucci, author, web designer, and expert in user experience
- Kiko Dinucci, Brazilian musician

== See also ==
- Nucci
