= Orlando Merlini =

Italian painter

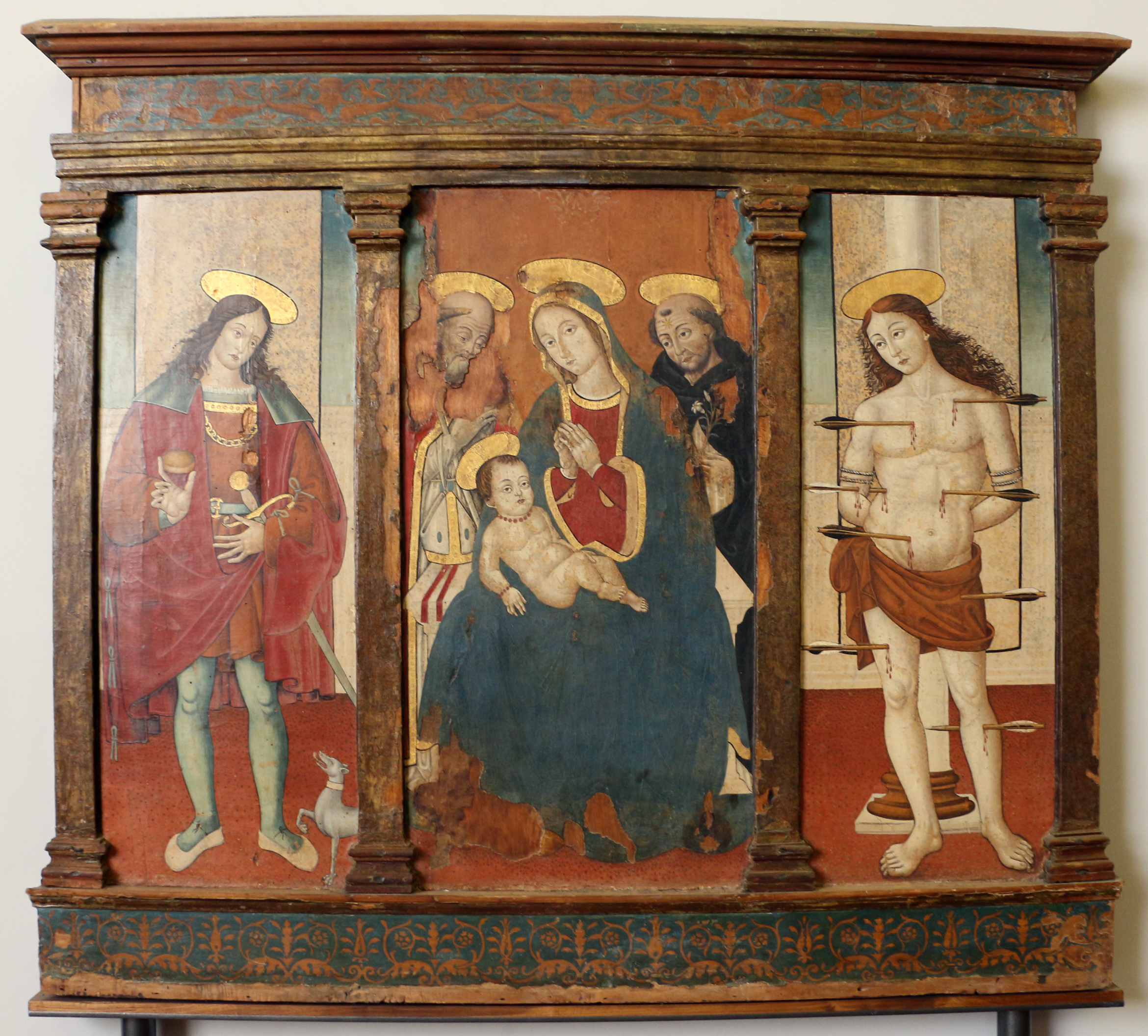
Entroned Madonna and saints, Gubbio Civic Museum

Orlando Merlini (died 1510) was an Italian painter of the Renaissance, active in Gubbio in Umbria.

== Biography ==
He was a follower of the style of Sinibaldo Ibi. His son, Ventura Merlino, was also a painter in Gubbio.
