= Virgilio Nucci =

Italian painter

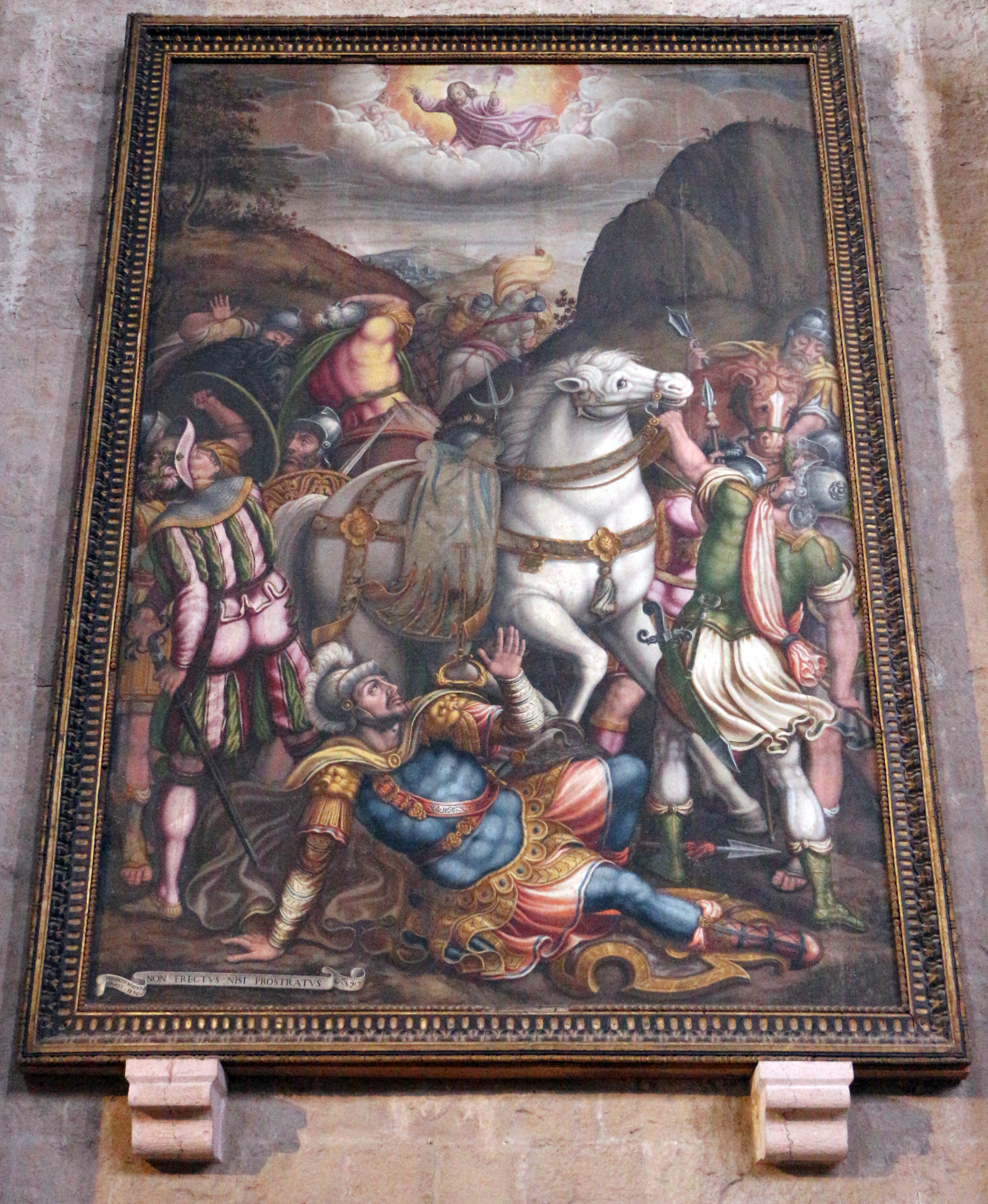
Conversion of St. Paul, 1596

Virgilio Nucci (1545-1620) was an Italian painter of the late-Renaissance or Mannerism period.

== Biography ==
He was born in Gubbio. He was son of Benedetto Nucci Virgilio like his brother trained also in Rome with Daniele da Volterra. The painter Felice Damiani left some of his painting supplies to Virgilio.

Most of his works are in Gubbio, including the Cathedral (1596), church of Sant'Agostino, and the Pinacoteca. He also painted for the church of Madonna dell'Olivo (1589) near Passignano.
