= San Francesco, Gubbio =

Church in Gubbio, Italy

Coordinates: 43.3516°N 12.5766°E

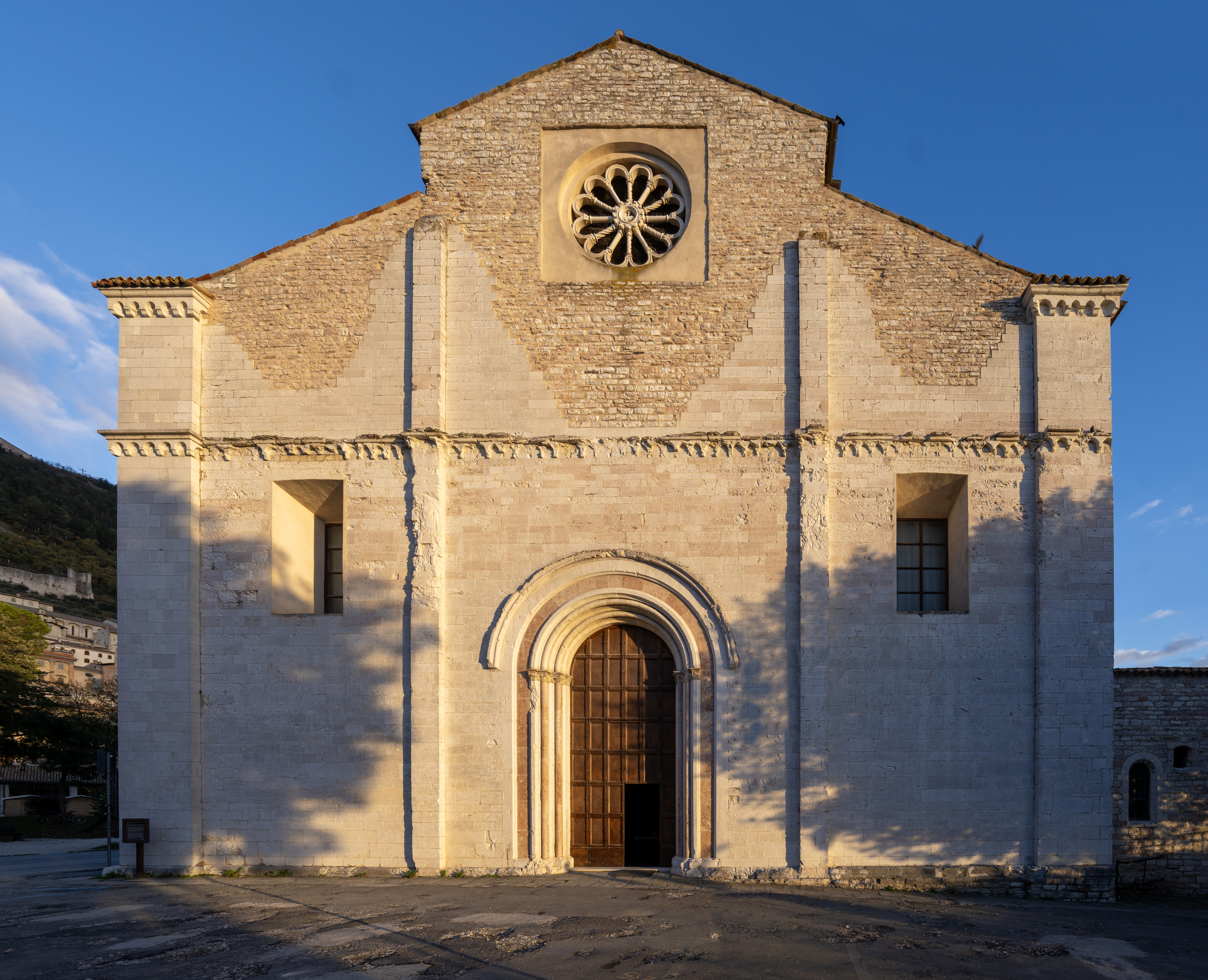
Facade of San Francesco

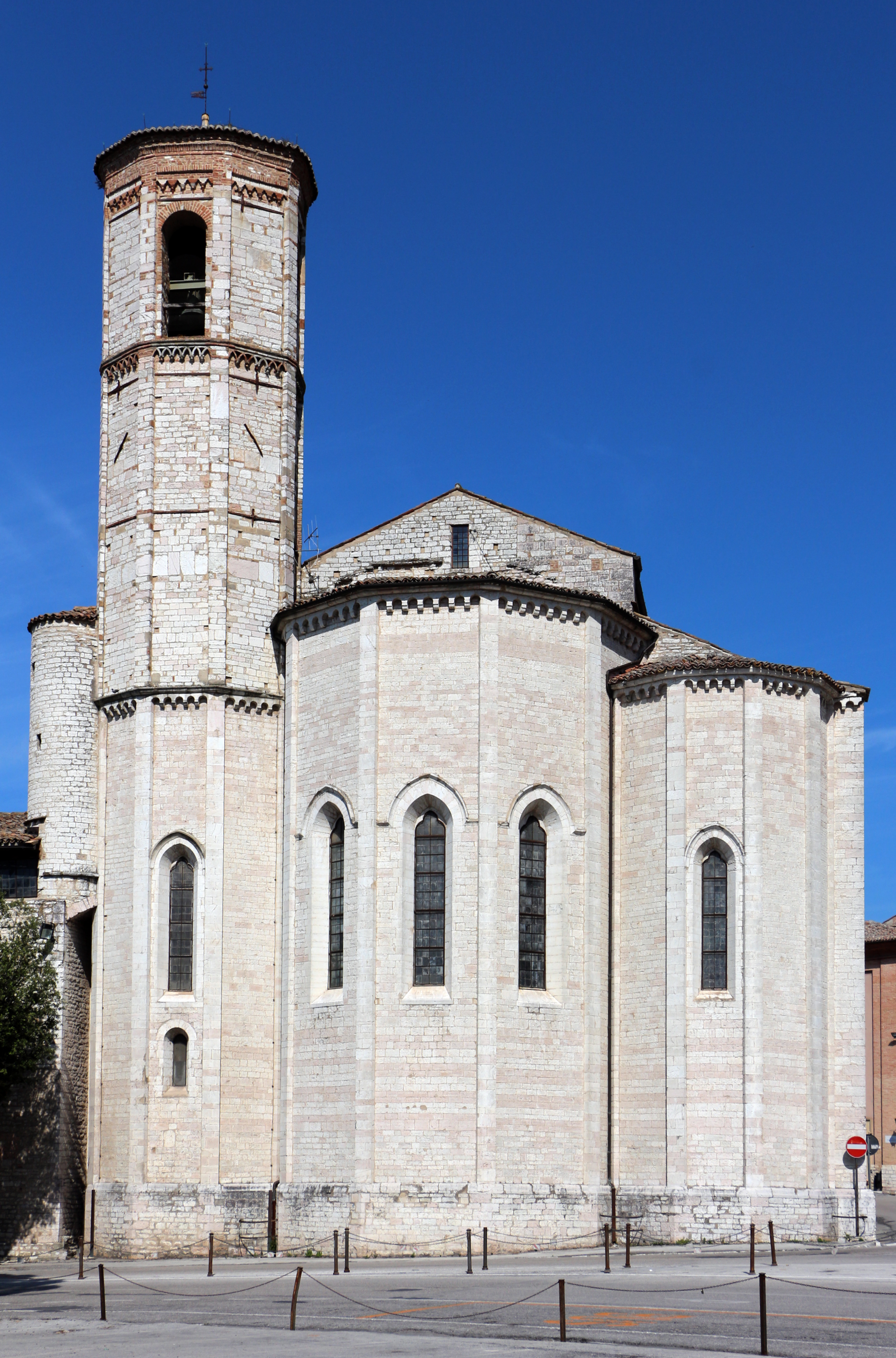
Apse and bell-tower of San Francesco

San Francesco is a Gothic-style, Roman Catholic church in the lower town of Gubbio, Umbria, in Italy.

== History ==
St Francis of Assisi, who was closely associated with Gubbio, supposedly was once housed in a room adjacent to the church. Tradition holds that the site belonged to Giacomello Spadalunga, who clothed St Francis after his encounter with a robber.

This church is different than the smaller chapel or oratory of San Francesco della Pace in Gubbio, built by the Guild of Masons and Stonecutters. This church was built putatively on the cave where, according to tradition, the Wolf of Gubbio lived and where the wolf was buried.

The Gothic style church was built by 1256, and decoration was completed by 1291. The present octagonal bell tower was constructed in the 14th century. The interior was reconstructed in the 18th century, though the church contains some of the original faded fresco work from the 15th century.

In the interior, Ottaviano Nelli painted a series of frescoes, mainly depicting the Story of the Virgin Mary (circa 1410–1415). The centre apse has a fresco of Christ blessing with four saints by an anonymous late 13th-century painter. Other 14th-century frescoes can be found throughout the church and adjacent convent. The church has an altarpiece depicting the Immaculate Conception by Antonio Gherardi of Rieti. It contains a St Francis before a cross (1540) by Benedetto Nucci, and the sacristy has a Virgin and child with serpent by Benedict's son, Virgilio.

Under the altar of San Carlo Borromeo are the remains of a blessed nun of a Franciscan order, Franceschina, who died on 6 July 1255, returning from Assisi.
