= Ottaviano Nelli =

Italian painter

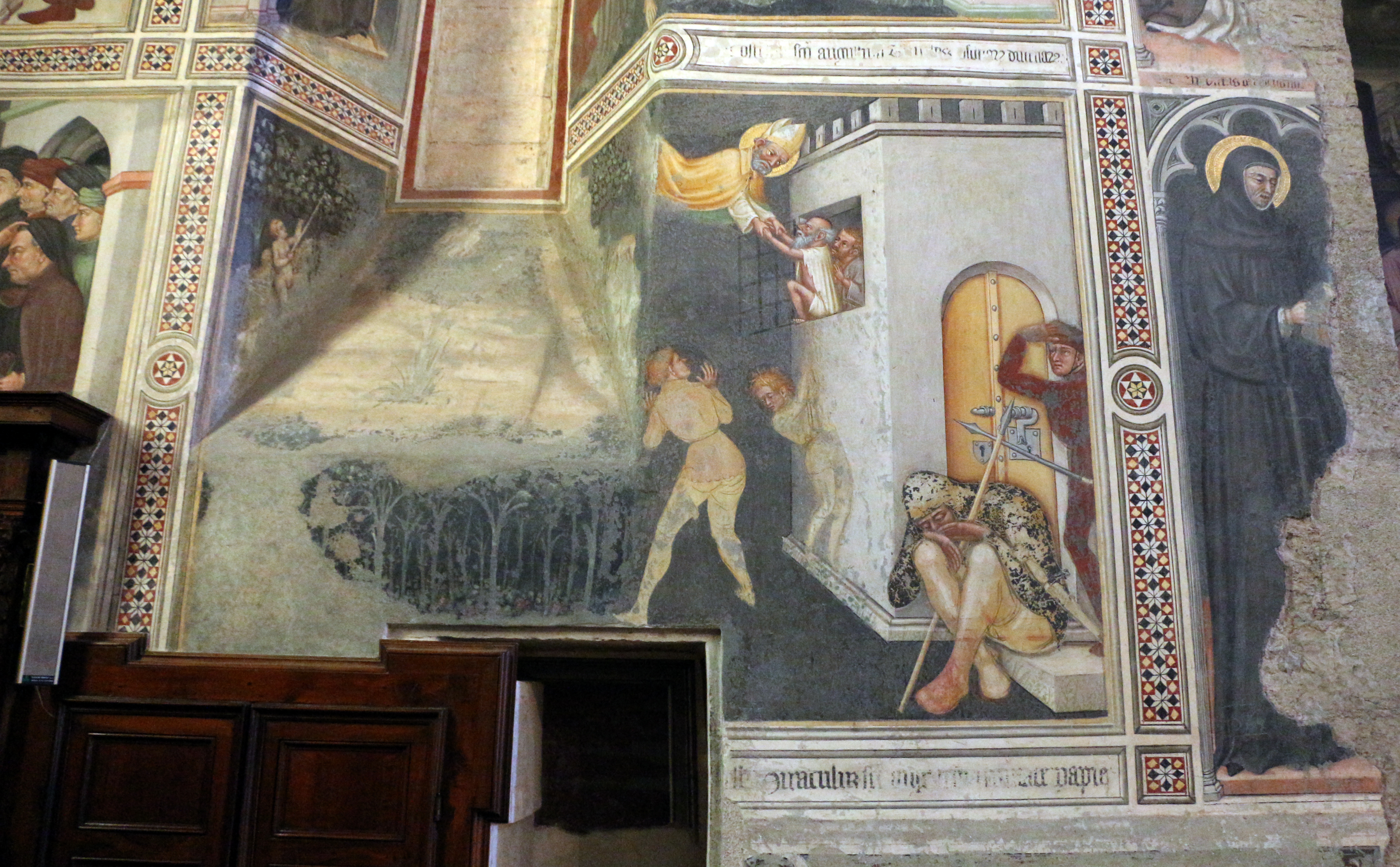
Nelli and workshop, fresco cycle of the life of Saint Augustine, Liberating prisoners, in Sant'Agostino, Gubbio, c. 1430–40.

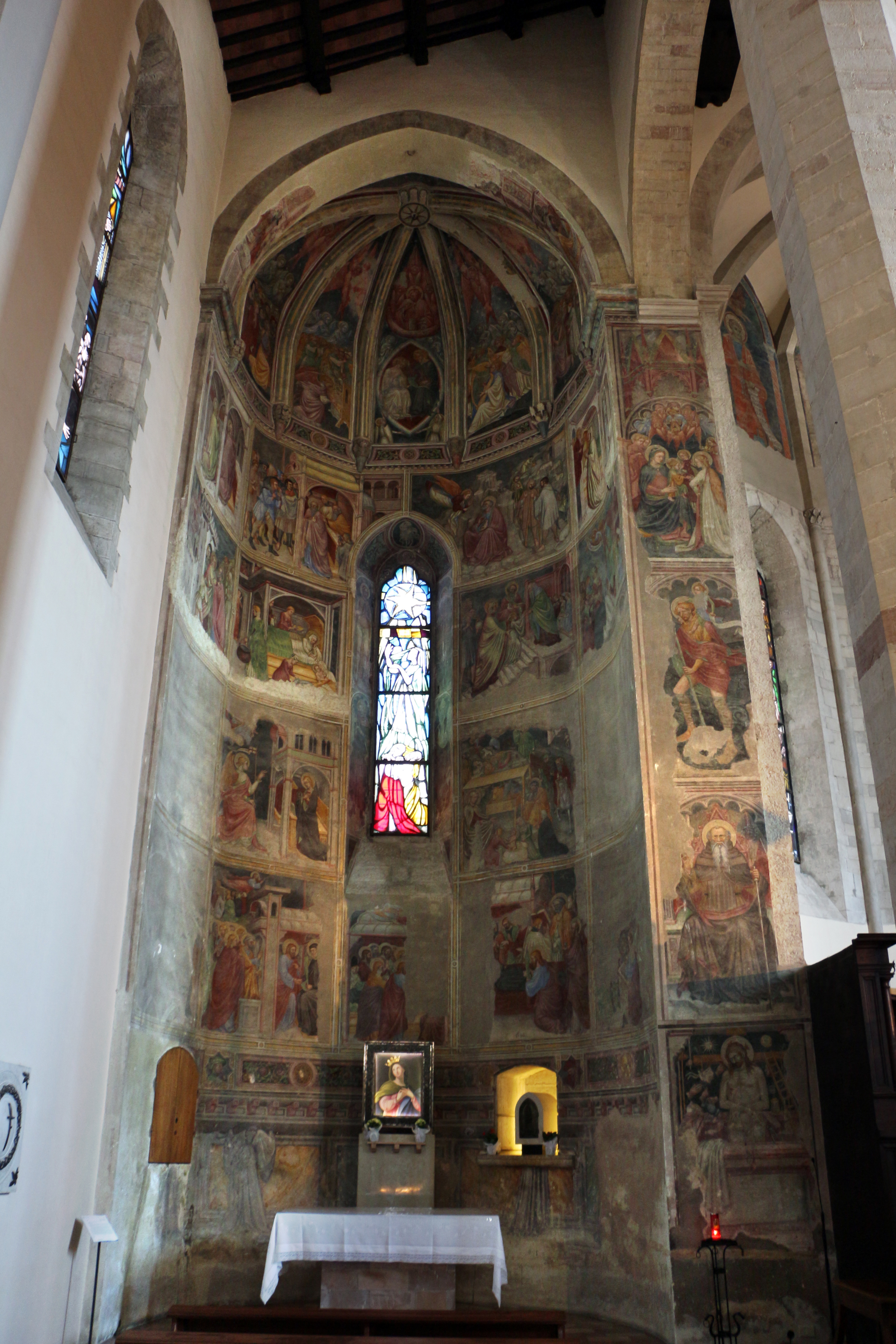
Nelli and workshop, fresco cycle of the Life of the Virgin, 1410–15, San Francesco, Gubbio.

Ottaviano Nelli (1375–1444?) was an Italian painter of the early Quattrocento. Nelli primarily painted frescoes, but also panel paintings. He had several pupils and two painters were influenced by him.

== Biography ==
He was born in Gubbio in Umbria to the painter Martino Nelli, and was active there and in Perugia (1400), Urbino, Assisi, and Foligno. Among his pupils was his brother Tommaso, Domenico Di Cecco di Baldi, Giovanni Pintali, Giacomo Di Bedo, and Ubaldo Di Matteo.

Nelli was "consul" (a local government representative) for the Sant'Andrea district of Gubbio in 1440 and during the same year, the priors of Perugia had him paint the coat of arms of the duke Gian Galeazzo Visconti with the help of Francesco d'Antonio and Christoforo di Nicoluccio from Perugia. In 1403, he painted Madonna del Belvedere at Gubbio and the Polyptych of Pietralunga. Nelli painted the frescoes of the Trinci Palace in Foligno in 1424. From 1428 to 1432, he was a part of the brotherhood of Santa Croce, Florence and worked on the painting Madonna Crowned by Angels for the church. In 1441, Domenico di Cecco became his pupil and sometime around that year he adopted a son named Mars. His wife Balda died sometime before 1458.

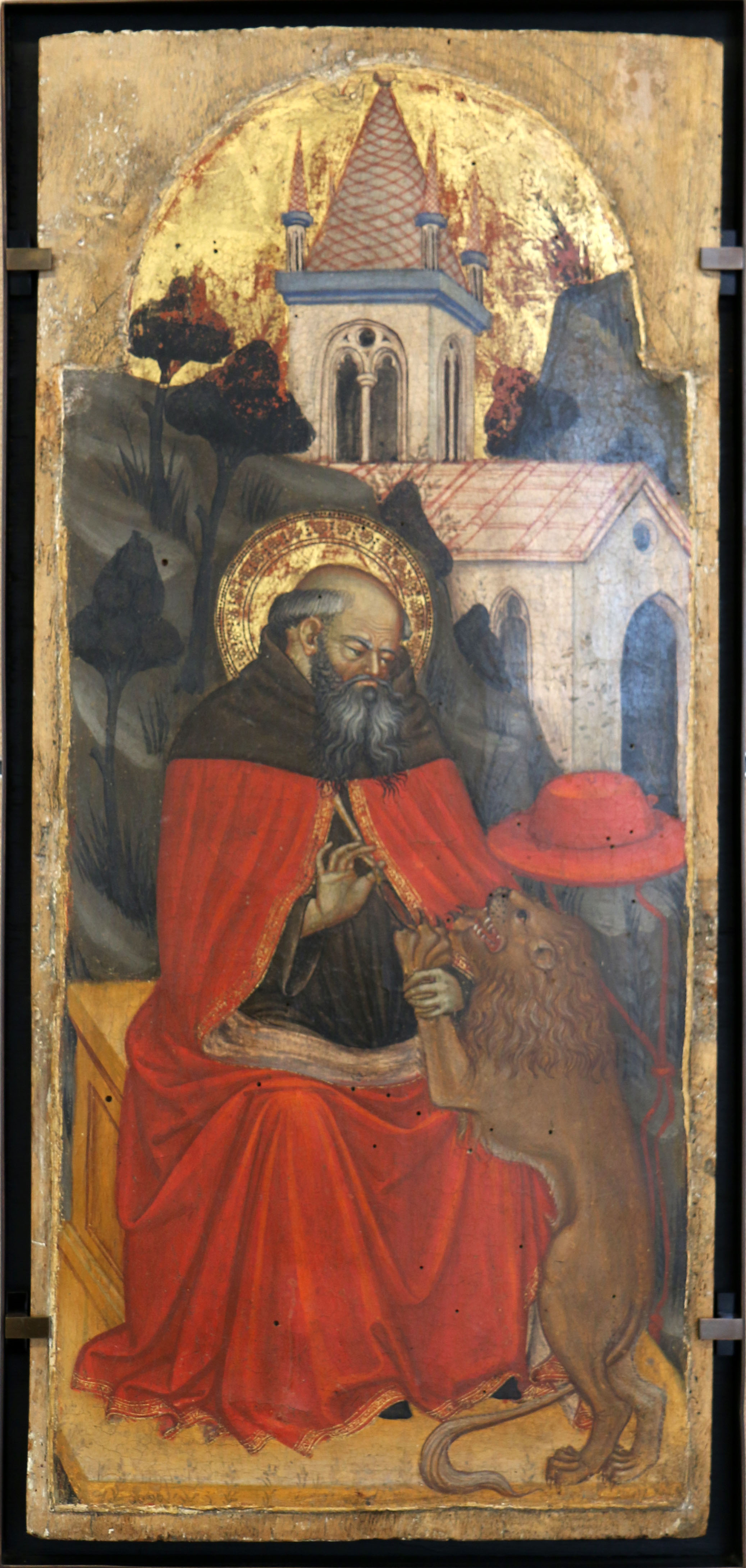
Saint Jerome Healing the Lion by Ottaviano Nelli, on panel, Musée du Petit Palais, Avignon

The painters Gentile da Fabriano and Giovanni Sanzio were influenced by Nelli. It is believed that Fabriano and Nelli worked together to decorate the church choir of Sant'Agostino, Gubbio.

Nelli and his workshop primarily painted frescoes, many of them churches in Gubbio and the nearby cities in Umbria. He painted some easel paintings on panel, but they are rare. One of his easel paintings can be found in the church of Sant'Agostino, Gubbio, but it has been almost entirely repainted. A second similar easel painting is at Montefalco. Austen Henry Layard wrote that Nelli's easel paintings were "far inferior to his works in fresco".

== Death ==
Nothing is recorded about Nelli after 1444, and it is presumed that he died during that year. Many local artists who were influenced by him did not become significant. The Gubbian school, which he was a part of, was taken over by the one which Perugino started at Perugia by the end of the 15th century.

== Works ==
- Madonna del Belvedere (1403), Church of Santa Maria Nuova, Gubbio.
- Life of the Virgin (1408 - 1413 circa), Fresco cycle, Church of San Francesco, Gubbio.
- Madonna del latte e angeli, Urbino, Oratorio dell'Umiltà.
- Life of the Virgin (1424), Fresco cycle, Foligno, Chapel of Palazzo Trinci.
- Madonna del latte (post 1427), Urbino, Oratory of Santa Croce.
- Panels from a polyptych, of before 1430, now divided (with at least one missing):
  - Nativity of Christ, Worcester Art Museum, Worcester, Mass.
  - Saint Jerome, Musée du Petit Palais, Avignon
  - Circumcision of Christ and Mystical Marriage of Saint Francis, Pinacoteca, Vatican
- Life of Saint Augustine, fresco cycle, c. 1430-40, Sant'Agostino, Gubbio
- Madonna della misericordia e santi, Urbino, Church of the Madonna dell'Homo
- Last Judgement, fresco, Church of Sant'Agostino, Gubbio.
- Madonna, fresco, Church of Santa Maria della Piaggiola, Gubbio
