= Sinibaldo Ibi =

Italian painter

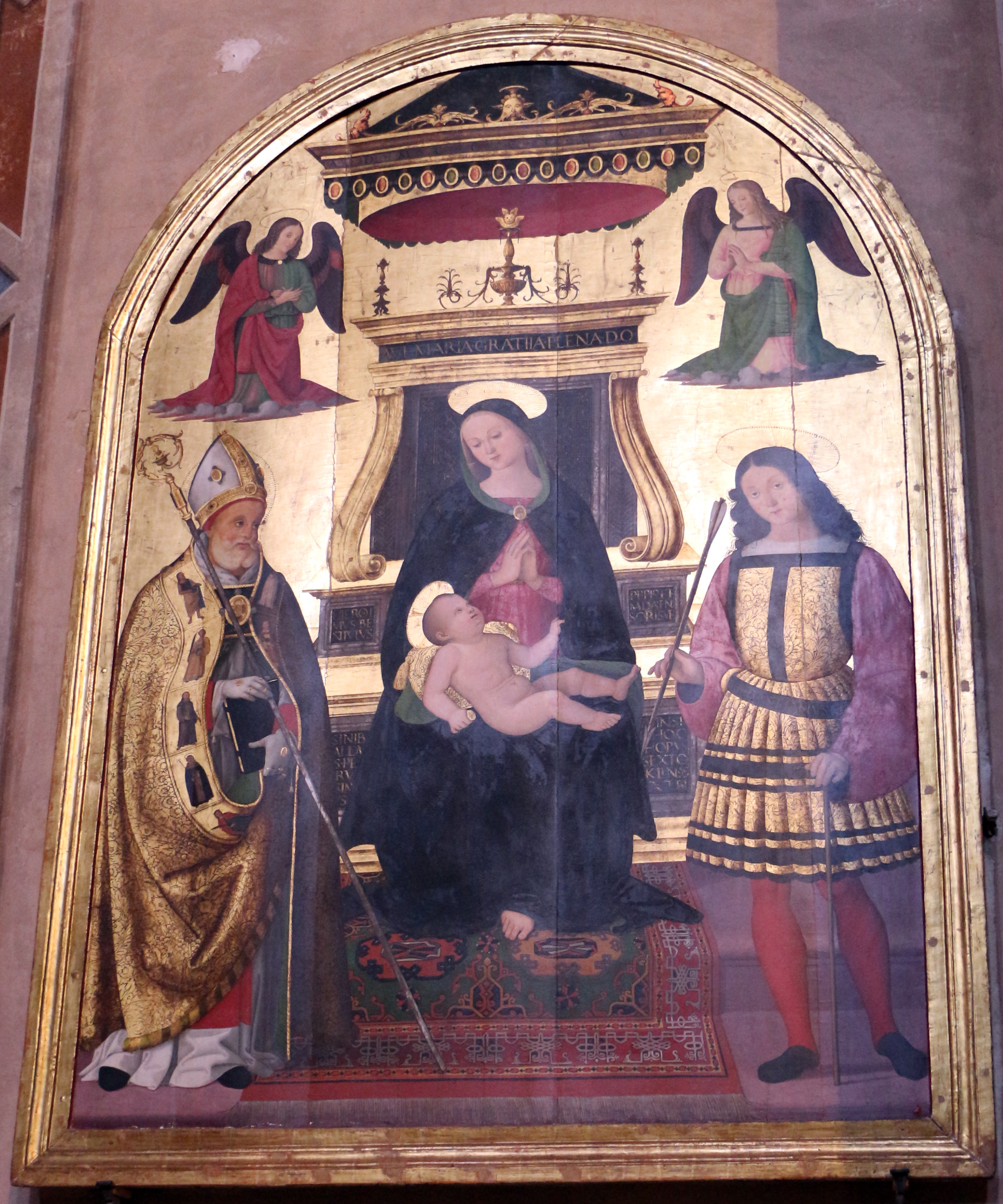
Madonna and saints, Duomo of Gubbio

Sinibaldo Ibi was an Italian painter, active in the early 16th century. He probably resided at Gubbio, and was a member of the Guild of Perugia in 1527. In 1507 he painted a Virgin and Child, between SS. Sebastian and Tibaldo. for one of the altar pieces in the Cathedral of Gubbio. One of his followers and contemporary collaborators was Orlando Merlino. In the Civic Art Gallery at Perugia is an Annunciation (1528) by Ibi.
