= San Secondo, Gubbio =

Roman Catholic church in Gubbio, Italy

San Secondo is a Roman Catholic church and monastery located on Via Tifernate #6 just west of the medieval walls of Gubbio, region of Umbria, in Italy. The school of canons once associated with this church educated the patron saint of Gubbio, Saint Ubaldo (1085–1160).

== History ==
Legend holds that a church at the site was founded in 292 by a noblewoman Eudossia of the Gabrielli family of Gubbio, to house the relics of bishop San Secondo, a martyr of the persecutions of Emperor Maximian.

A church at the site was noted between the years 496 and 523 to hold the relics of the martyr-bishops, Secondo and Agabio. By the year 1141, Pope Innocent II places under his protection the rector of the Augustinian canonry associated the church of Santi Agapio e Secondino.

The present buildings are the result of a number of reconstructions and refurbishments. The church apse has an architectural style from the 12-13th century. The cloister of the canonry dates from the 12th-15th centuries. The nave of the church was rebuilt starting in 1712 under the guidance of the Abbot Morosini of Venice. The monastery houses the Biblioteca Agostino Steuco, that holds over 18,000 volumes including 3 incunables and 37 16th-century texts. In addition to these ancient texts, the library also holds the complete works of Tommaso da Kempis, works of Saint Alfonso dei Liguori, works by Paolo Beni (1553–1625), and the text of "Fabbrica degli orologi solari" by the Canons Regular Valentino Pini (died 1607).

The seminary at the site had autonomous canons regular until the 13th century, when they became linked to the Congregation del SS. Salvatore of Bologna. They also joined by 1413 with the Augustinian monks in the nearby Eremo di Sant'Ambrogio. In the 19th century, they became part of the Canons Lateran. The monastery underwent two suppressions, first in 1810 under Napoleonic occupation, and again in 1866. The last suppression added to the libraries collections with books and manuscripts from San Giuseppe, San Pietro in Vincoli, Sant’Andrea di Vercelli, and others.
