= Domenico di Cecco =

Italian painter

Domenico di Cecco, also known by Domenico di Cecco di Baldi (active mid-15th century) was an Italian painter of the Quattrocento.

== Biography ==
He was born in Gubbio, and active there, where he was a pupil of Ottaviano Nelli. In 1444, he painted a Grieving Madonna and St Peter for the church of Santa Maria della Piaggiola in Gubbio.
