= Sant'Agostino, Gubbio =

Church building in Gubbio, Italy

Coordinates: 43.3497°N 12.5847°E

Sant'Agostino is a Gothic-Romanesque style Roman Catholic church in Gubbio, region of Umbria, Italy.

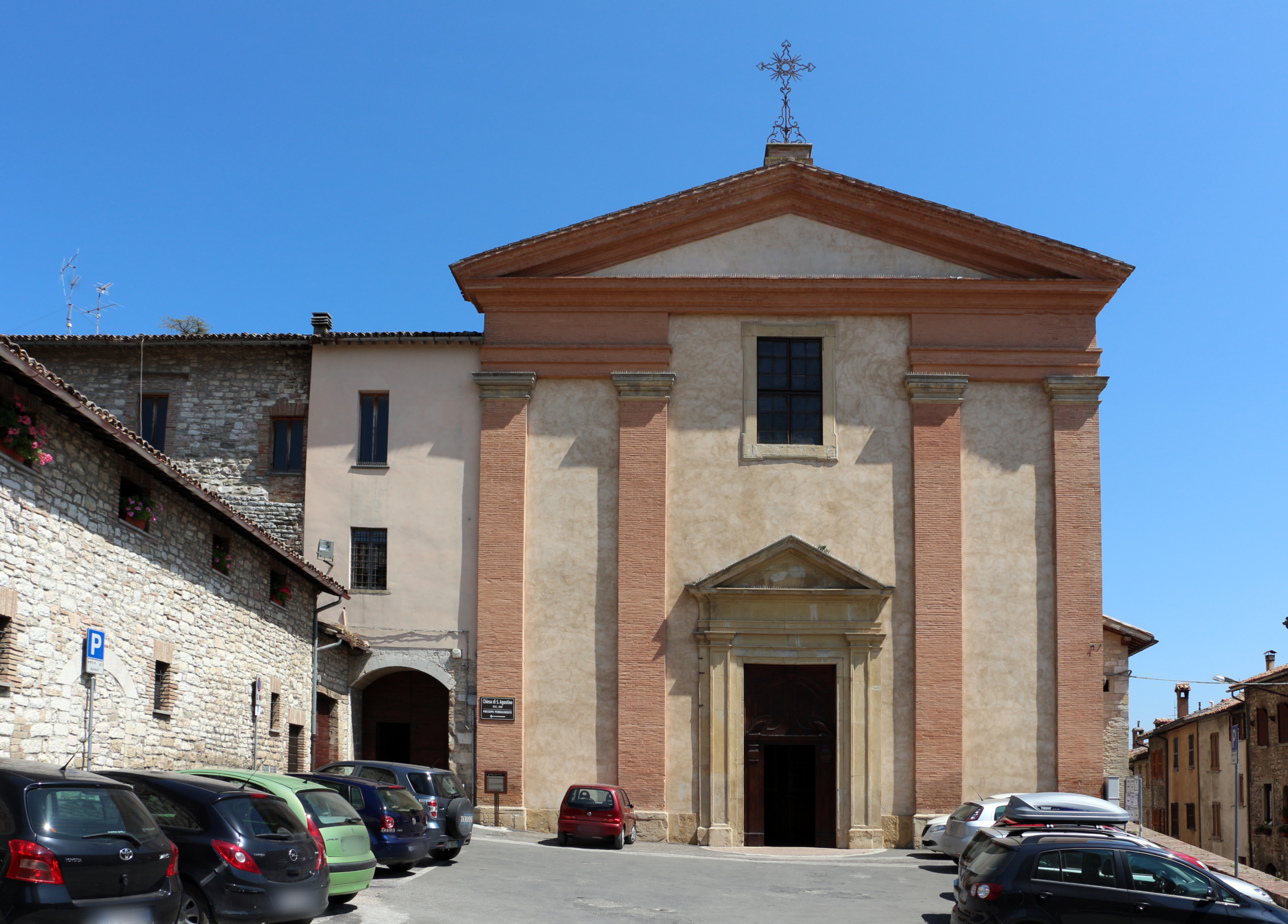
Sant'Agostino (Gubbio)

A church at the site was built in the second half of the 13th century. Among the works inside are

- Jesus and the Samaritan (1580), by Virgilio Nucci (first chapel on left)
- Madonna del Soccorso, 15th century (5th chapel on left)
- Madonna di Grazia, fresco attributed to Ottaviano Nelli (3rd chapel right)
- Baptism of St Augustine (1594), di Felice Damiani (4th chapel right)
- Last Judgement fresco in Arch, by Jacopo Salimbeni of San Severino Marche and studio of Ottaviano Nelli
- Story of St Augustine (1420) in the apse, studio of Ottaviano Nelli
