= Benedetto Nucci =

Italian painter

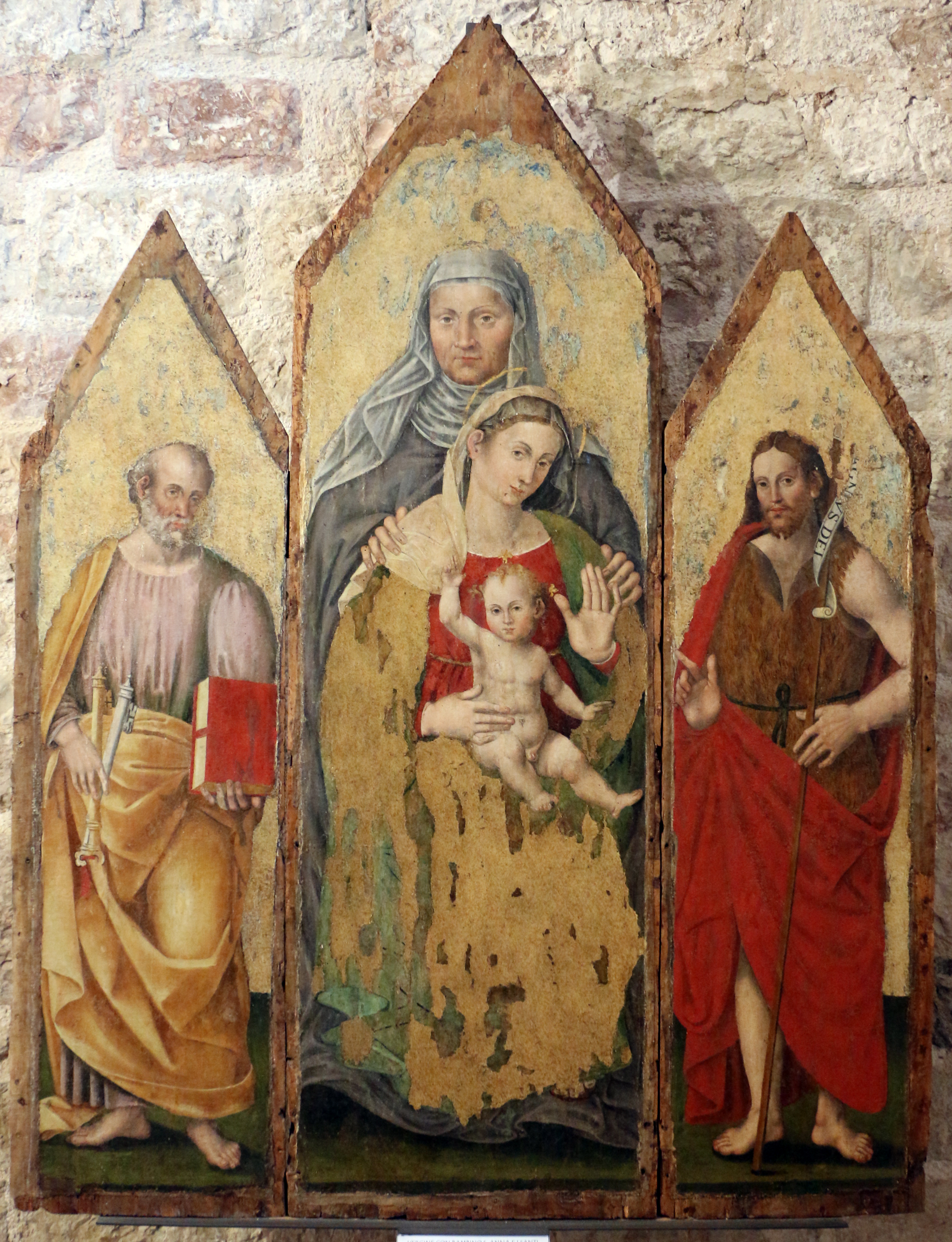
Trittico di Baccaresca (1565 ca.), Gubbio, Museo Diocesano

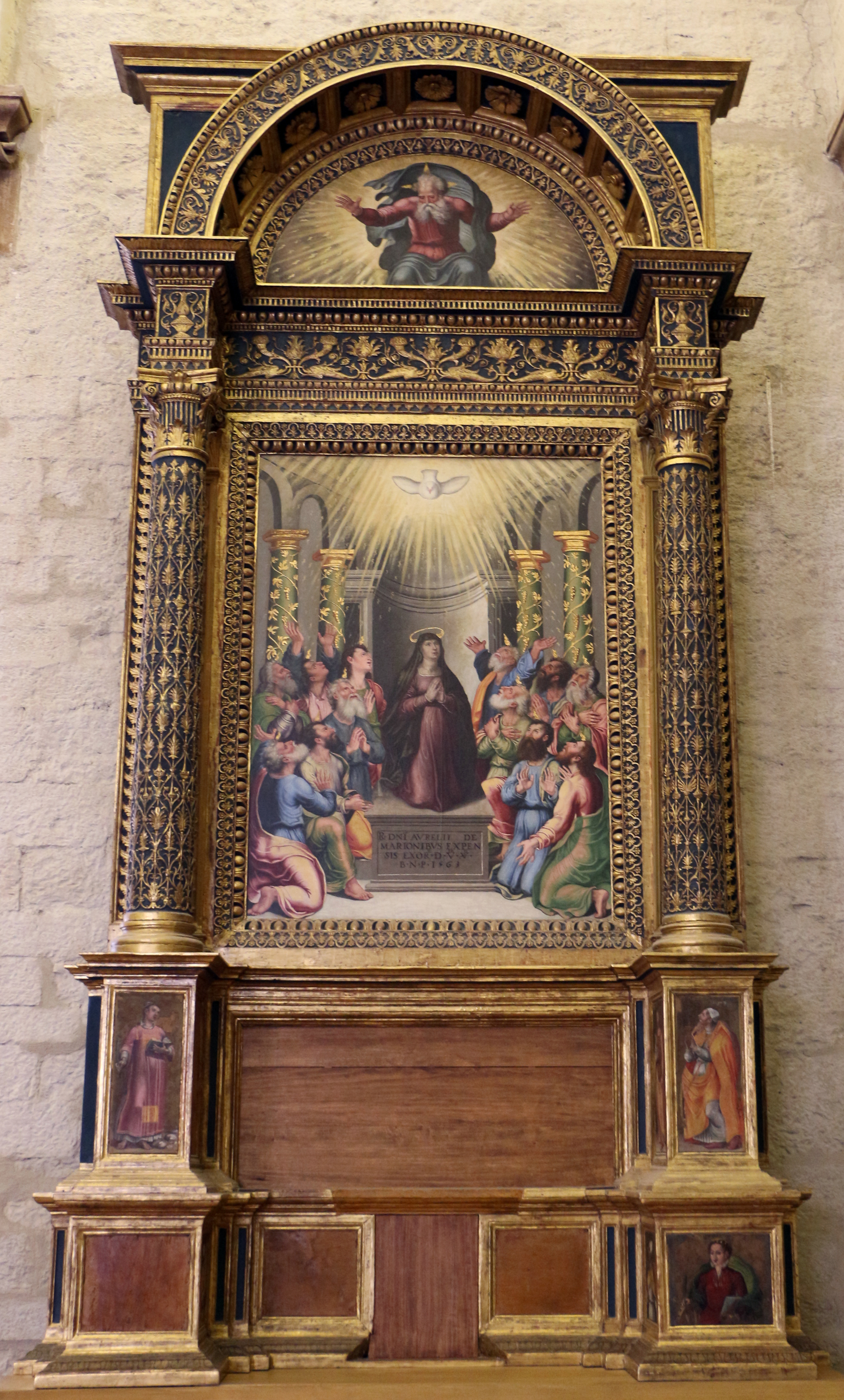
Pentecost (1563), Gubbio, Museo Civico

Benedetto Nucci (1515–1587) was an Italian painter of the late-Renaissance or Mannerism period.

== Biography ==
He was born in Cagli. He was a pupil of Pietro Paolo Baldinacci in Gubbio, in the Church State, today in Umbria. Benedetto married his master's daughter, Orsolina, in 1549. He did not train with Raffaellino dal Colle, as reported, but was highly influenced by Raphael.

He painted several works, mainly for religious institutions in northern Umbria. Among them, a Madonna and Child with Saints (1570) for the Cathedral in Gubbio, and a triptych depicting the Madonna and Child with Saint Anne, Saint Peter and Saint John the Baptist (Trittico di Baccaresca, ca. 1565, Gubbio, Museo Diocesano). The latter work was commissioned by Gabriele, Filippo and Antonio Gabrielli for the church in their castle at Baccaresca, near Gubbio.

Among his pupils were his son (or brother) Virgilio (trained also in Rome with Daniele da Volterra, and died in Gubbio in 1621); Mario Marioni; Giovanni Maria Baldassini (active 1540–1601); Bernardino Brozzi (1555–1617); and one of the more prominent painters of Gubbio, Felice Damiani.
