= Santa Croce della Foce =

Church in Umbria, Italy

Coordinates: 43°21′24.5″N 12°34′35.4″E

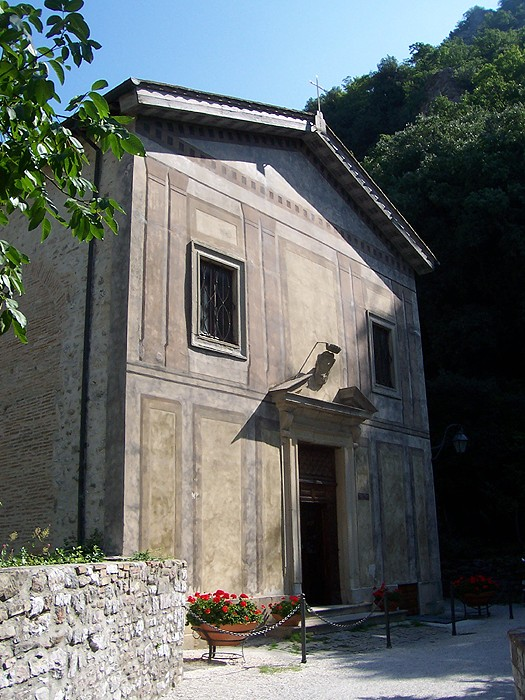
Church of Santa Croce della Foce

The small church of Santa Croce della Foce is a medieval Roman Catholic church in the lower town of Gubbio, Umbria, in Italy. There is a church of the same name in Sarno in Campania.

== History ==
The church was built in the 13th century at the site of an ancient chapel. By the 15th century, it was attached to a confraternity. The building was refurbished in the 16th and 17th centuries, creating a sober Renaissance facade for the ornate Baroque interiors, and ceilings, now present. Among the works inside are a 16th-century banner depicting the Adoration of the Cross by Pietro Paolo Baldinacci and his pupil Silvio (1st altar on left); a San Carlo Borromeo by Alessandro Brunelli of Perugia (3rd altar on the left); and a Madonna and child with saints (1668) by Allegrini (2nd altar on right). The Baroque wooden statues of Christ and the Madonna Addolorata, on the main altar were completed by Carlo Magistretti and Domenico Valli. The stucco work on the triumphal arch and ceiling was completed in the 17th century.

The church is also known because, on the Friday of Holy Week, the Procession of the Dead Christ (Processione del Cristo Morto) leaves from this church. This elaborate ritual procession commemorates the passion of Christ. In the past, participating confraternities, including the one of this church, included flagellants. However, the procession still includes white-gowned members anonymously parading under capirotes, carrying statues of the dead Christ and the Madonna Addolorata. In a near hypnotic ceremonial spectacle that has persisted for centuries, as they wend through and around the town, they highlight the objects of the Passion, clatter with metal cow-bell-like instruments, light cauldrons of flames, and chant a Miserere.
