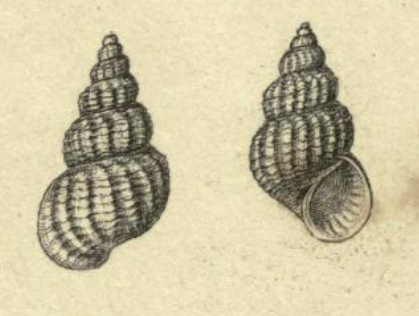
- Shell of Alvania crassistriata (holotype)

Scientific classification
- Kingdom: Animalia
- Phylum: Mollusca
- Class: Gastropoda
- Subclass: Caenogastropoda
- Order: Littorinimorpha
- Superfamily: Rissooidea
- Family: Rissoidae
- Genus: Alvania
- Species: †A. crassistriata

Binomial name
- †Alvania crassistriata (S. V. Wood, 1848)

Synonyms
- † Actonia crassistriata (S. V. Wood, 1848) superseded combination; † Rissoa crassistria [sic] † misspelling; † Rissoa crassistriata S. V. Wood, 1848 superseded combination (Alvania accepted as full genus)

= Alvania crassistriata =

Species of gastropod

Alvania crassistriata is an extinct species of minute sea snail, a marine gastropod mollusk or micromollusk in the family Rissoidae.

== Description ==
The length of the shell attains 2 mm, its diameter 1.2 mm.

(Original description) The shell is turriculate and elevated, thick and strong. It contains five or six convex whorls. The suture is deep and distinct. The shell is externally ornamented with 10-12 vertical and obtuse ribs and is transversely striated. The striae or ridges are few and elevated, carried over the ribs. The aperture is subcircular, with a thickened and marginate outer lip, denticulated within the aperture.

== Distribution ==
Fossils were found in the salt mines of Wieliczka, Poland.
