= Żupny Castle =

Castle in Wieliczka, southern Poland

Wieliczka and Bochnia Royal Salt Mines
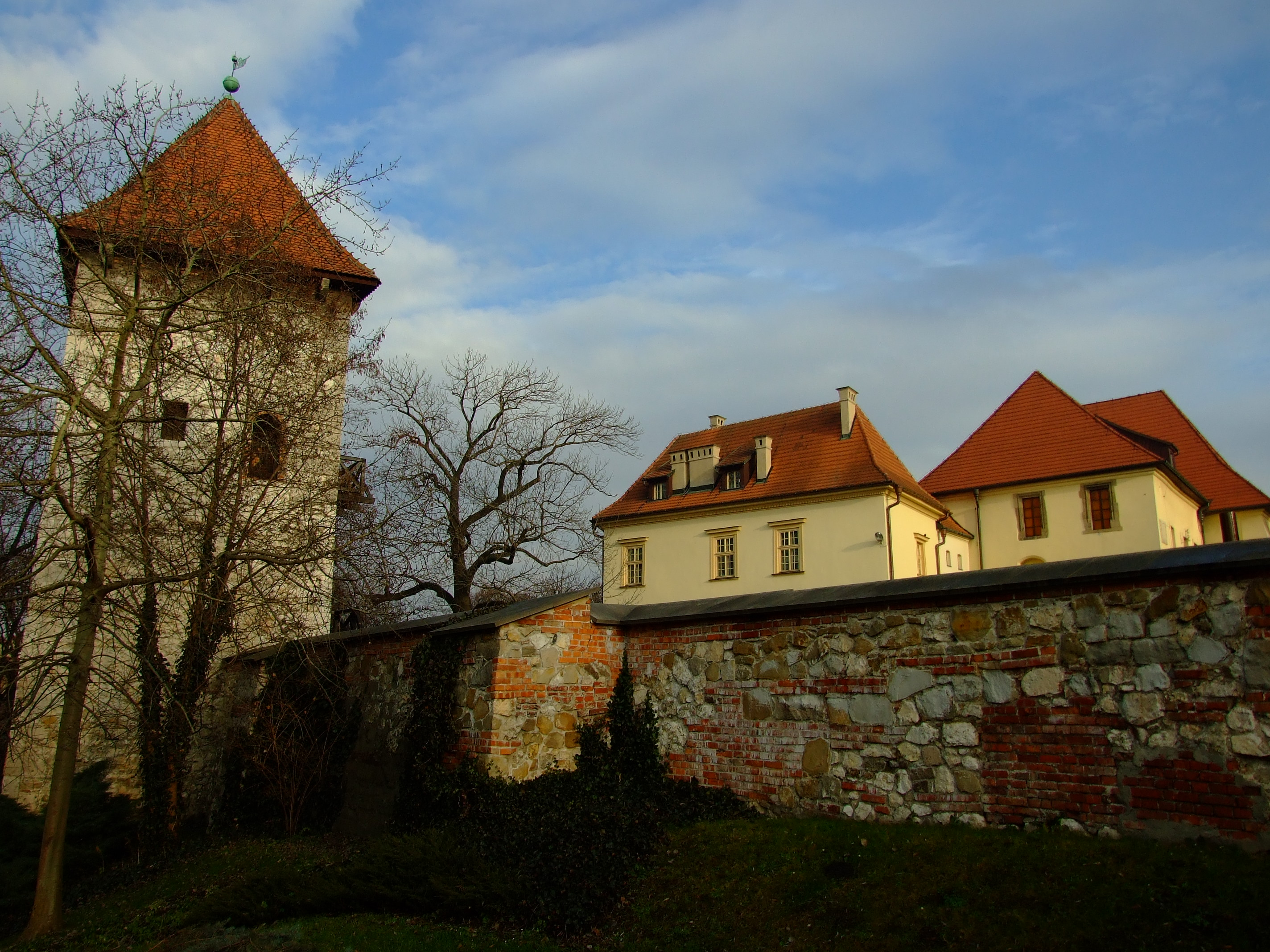
- Żupny Castle

- Location of the Żupna Castle in Poland
- 49°59′01″N 20°03′34″E
- Location: Wieliczka, Lesser Poland, in Poland

Site notes
- Architectural style: Gothic

UNESCO World Heritage Site
- Type: Cultural
- Designated: 2013 Wieliczka Salt Mine UNESCO Extension
- Reference no.: 32

Żupny Castle is a Gothic castle, the former headquarters of the Wieliczka and Bochnia Salt Mine. The castle is located in the former mine complex and was designated as part of the Wieliczka and Bochnia UNESCO World Heritage Site, since an expansion in 2013. The castle is located in Wieliczka, Lesser Poland Voivodeship, in Poland.

== History ==
A castle was built on top of the hillside in the fourteenth century, under the reign of Casimir III the Great and completed the sixteenth during the reign of Sigismund I the Old. The current castle was built in a square formation, including living quarters outside the castle walls. From the castle's earliest days, up until 1945, the castle was the headquarters of the Wieliczka Salt Mine. Currently, the castle houses an exhibition containing the history of Wieliczka from the past decades, and the only collection of saltshakers in Poland.
