= Sanctuary of Santa Maria infra Saxa, Genga =

Building in Genga, Italy

Coordinates: 43.4308°N 12.9360°E

The Sanctuary of Santa Maria infra Saxa and the so-called Tempio di Valadier are two sanctuaries and chapel located at the entrance of the Frasassi Caves, a remarkable karst cave system in the municipality of Genga, in the province of Ancona, Marche, Italy.

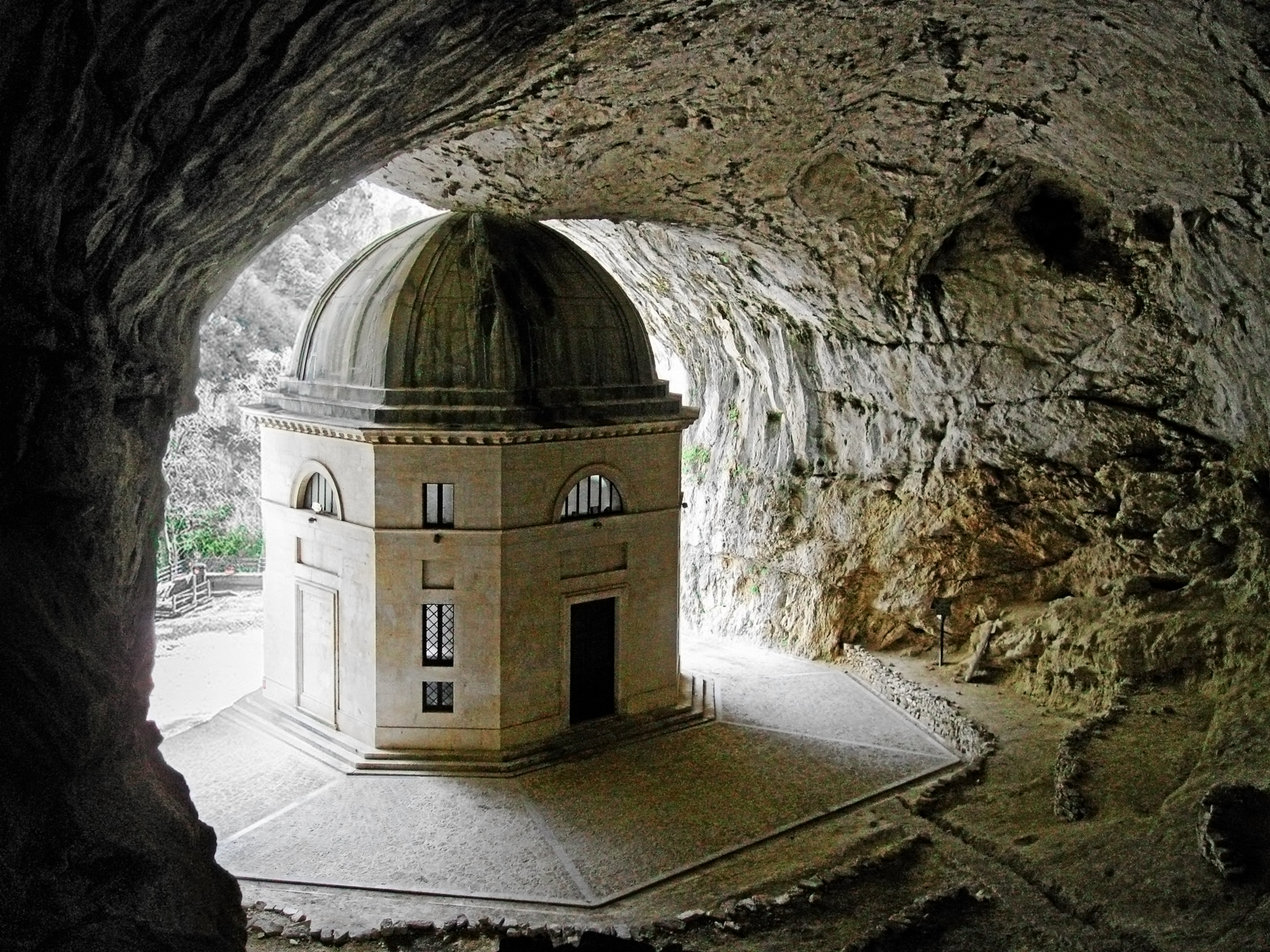
So-called Tempio di Valadier

The sanctuary and chapel are located within a few dozen meters of each other, on a ledge entrance to the Frasassi cave system. The sanctuary is ancient; it is cited in documents from 1029. It is a simple stone structure built by Benedictine monks to house a burned image of the Madonna.

A Tempietto or small octagonal temple on the site was first proposed in 1817 by the future Pope Leo XII, who was originally from Genga. The white travertine structure, completed in 1827 after Leo had become pope, was long thought to have been designed by Giuseppe Valadier, and is still widely referred to as the "Tempio di Valadier". However, in 2016 a study of previously unexamined archives by Maria Cristina Cavola revealed that Valadier had absolutely nothing to do with the building: it was rather an accretive design to which a series of local architects and project managers made successive contributions. The chapel once housed a marble statue of the Madonna and child by the studio of Antonio Canova. The statue is now in the civic museum of Genga, and been substituted by a copy. When the Tempietto was built, a number of remains of skeletons were found in the opening of the cave.
