= Alvania conica =

Scientific classification
- Kingdom: Animalia
- Phylum: Mollusca
- Class: Gastropoda
- Subclass: Caenogastropoda
- Order: Littorinimorpha
- Superfamily: Rissooidea
- Family: Rissoidae
- Genus: Alvania
- Species: †A. conica

Binomial name
- †Alvania conica Schwartz von Mohrenstern, 1867

Species of gastropod

Alvania conica is an extinct species of minute sea snail, a marine gastropod mollusk or micromollusk in the family Rissoidae.

== Description ==
The length of the shell attains 2 mm, its diameter 1.2 mm.

== Distribution ==
Fossils were found in the salt mines of Wieliczka, Poland.
