= Grand Roc =

- Location within France

Highest point
- Elevation: 3,316 m (10,879 ft)
- Prominence: 25 m (82 ft)
- Coordinates: 45°15′56″N 06°41′17″E

Geography
- Location: Savoie, France
- Parent range: Vanoise Massif

Grand Roc is a mountain of Savoie, France. It lies in the Massif de la Vanoise range. It has an elevation of 3,316 m (10,879 ft) above sea level.

== See also ==
- Bochnia Salt Mine, southern Poland, central Europe
- Wieliczka Salt Mine, near Kraków in Poland, central Europe
- Khewra Salt Mine, in Punjab, Pakistan
- Kartchner Caverns State Park in Arizona, the United States
- Salt Cathedral of Zipaquirá, in Zipaquirá, Cundinamarca, Colombia, South America
- Chełm Chalk Tunnels, Poland, central Europe
- Frasassi Caves, Ancona in Italy, southern Europe
