= Apache Peak (Whetstone Mountains) =

Landform in Cochise County, Arizona

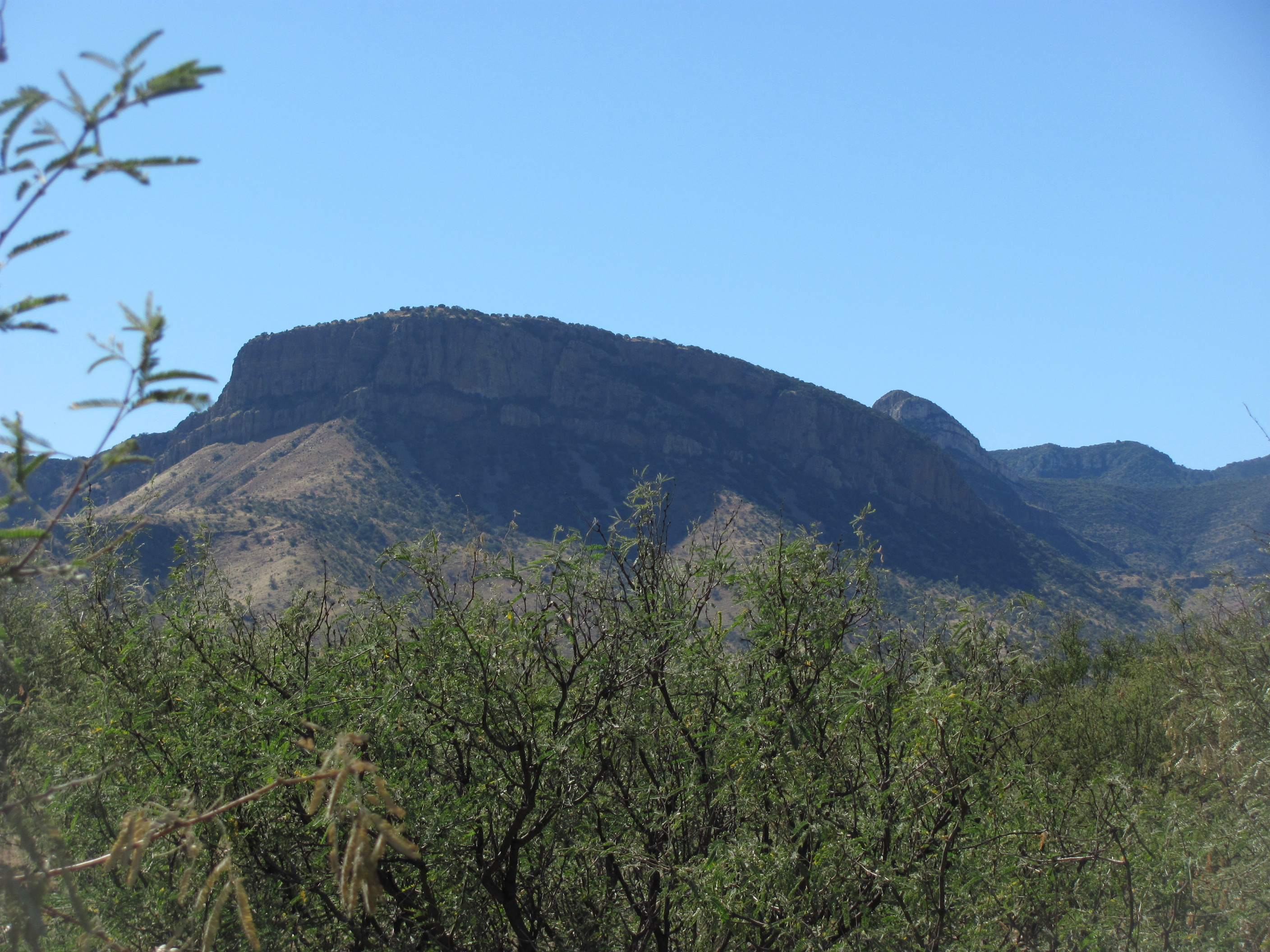
- Apache Peak

Highest point
- Elevation: 7,714 ft (2,351 m) NAVD 88
- Prominence: 2,886 ft (880 m)
- Coordinates: 31°49′29″N 110°25′47″W

Geography
- Location within Arizona Location within the United States
- Location: Cochise County, Arizona, U.S.
- Parent range: Whetstone Mountains
- Topo map: USGS Apache Peak

Apache Peak, at 7,714 feet (2,351 m), is the highest peak in the Whetstone Mountains in Cochise County, Arizona. The summit, located in the Coronado National Forest, is a popular local hiking destination. It is located near the Kartchner Caverns State Park, the city of Benson, Interstate 10, and Arizona State Route 90.

== Hiking ==
The summit of Apache Peak can be gained by a couple of different trails, which both involve moderately strenuous hikes with loose rocks, dense shrub, grass, cactus, succulents, and some small trees. Trails include the east side French Joe Canyon route and the west side Empire Ranch route. Hiking requires approximately 4,160 feet (1,268 m) in elevation gain and ~12.6 miles (20.3 km) distance round-trip.

== See also ==
- List of mountains and hills of Arizona by height
