= Salt Cathedral of Zipaquirá =

Underground Roman Catholic church in Colombia

Coordinates: 5.01876°N 74.0093°W

- Catedral de Sal
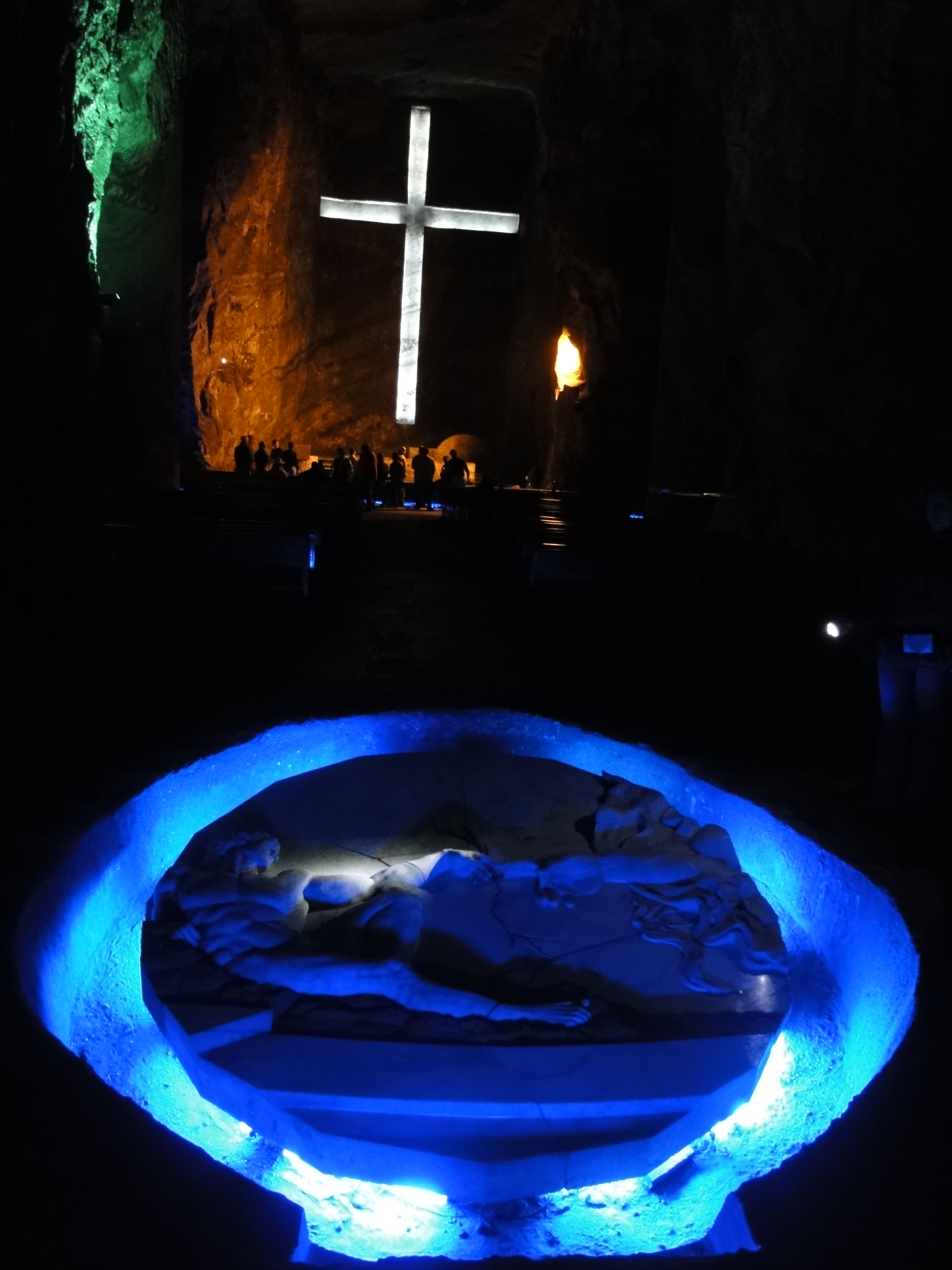
- La Creación del Hombre, sculpture by Carlos Enrique Rodríguez (Based in The Creation of Adam by Michelangelo), Central Barrel vault

Religion
- Affiliation: Roman Catholic
- Diocese: Diocese of Zipaquirá

Location
- Location: Zipaquirá, Colombia
- Interactive map of Salt Cathedral of Zipaquirá

Architecture
- Type: Church
- Completed: 1950

The Salt Cathedral of Zipaquirá (Spanish: Catedral de Sal de Zipaquirá) is an underground Roman Catholic church built within the tunnels of a salt mine 200 metres (660 ft) underground in a halite mountain near the city of Zipaquirá, in Cundinamarca, Colombia. It is a tourist destination and place of pilgrimage in the country.

The temple at the bottom has three sections, representing the birth, life, and death of Jesus. The icons, ornaments and architectural details are hand carved in the halite rock. Some marble sculptures are included. The cathedral is considered one of the most notable achievements of Colombian architecture, being described as a "Jewel of Modern Architecture". The cathedral represents a valuable cultural, environmental and religious patrimony for the Colombian people.

The cathedral is a functioning church that receives as many as 3,000 visitors on Sundays, but it has no bishop and therefore no official status as a cathedral in Catholicism.

== Geology ==
Zipaquirá is located in the Cordillera Oriental (Colombia), which is one of the three primary ranges that compose the Colombian Andes. This particular range, situated in the easternmost region, is bounded by high-angle reverse fault that dip towards the west. In terms of stratigraphy, the area consists of Paleozoic bedrock that is unconformably overlain by Jurassic and Cretaceous units, spanning a total of 12,000 meters. Additionally, there are salt-bearing deposits within these Mesozoic units, followed by Cenozoic strata that extend to a height of 1,500 meters in the highlands.

Cretaceous aged rock is most represented by the Villeta Group, which records extensive periods of marine deposition by creating alternating organic-laden shales, evaporitic pelagic limestone, and chert. The Chipaque Formation, which is the uppermost unit within the Villeta Group, contains various mineral deposits, such as pyrite, hematite, and bedded salt deposits. High bromine content found within the halitic salt supports a marine origin. laminated halite textures, cross-bedding, and claystone clasts, suggests sedimentary bedding of the halite as opposed to a diapric origin. The salt rock generally exhibits intense structural deformation which can be attributed to compressional tectonics present throughout the Andes. The positioning of the Zipaquirá salt presently is within a high-angle reverse fault along an anticlinal crest. It is believed that the salt-rich claystone experienced lateral plastic flow as a result of overburden loading and compressional stresses leading to changes in the lithostatic pressure gradient and subsequent flowage along the anticline plane.

The Zipaquirá mine was once part of three operating salt mines in the region of bedded rock salt, the other two being Nemocón and Upín (located near Restrepo, Meta, Colombia). All three mines lay within the same lithological unit and have compositionally similar halite with minor variations in the trace element composition but have different structural features.

Anhydrite deposits are also present but not in abundance. Beds range only a meter thick and is associated with brecciated claystone. Ultimately enclosed by the salt-bearing strata, the anhydrite-claystone deposits do not extend laterally in the mine, at most 70 meters in areas. Fine-grained anhydrite sand grains are deposited from erosion via groundwater through the evaporite deposits forming fractures where leached anhydrite can concentrate. In July 1968, anhydrite in the southwestern part of the Zipaquirá mine collapsed, forming a surface lake overlying the collapsed cavern. Anhydrite sand has appreciable concentrations of sulfur, suggesting the bacterial reduction of anhydrite, a sulfate-based mineral.

== Location ==
The complex is located in Zipaquirá, in Cundinamarca Department, 49 kilometres (30 mi) north of Bogotá, at 2,652 metres (8,701 ft) altitude. National highway 45A connects Bogotá and Zipaquirá, as does the Tren Turistico De La Sabana (Savanna tourist train). The city is recognized, not only for the cathedral, but for being near one of the oldest human settlements in the Americas, El Abra archaeological site.

== History ==
The halite mines were exploited already by the pre-Columbian Muisca culture since the 5th century BC, with it being one of their most important economic activities. The traditional halite mining was described by Alexander von Humboldt during his visit to Zipaquira in 1801. He depicts this deposit as bigger than the main halite mines of the time, such as those in Spain, Switzerland, Poland and the County of Tyrol with a calculated resource estimation of one million cubic meters. Von Humboldt also criticized the excavation techniques as being unpractical for future exploitation, recommending drift mining instead, since the halite tunnels don't require beams, lowering the costs.

=== Old cathedral ===
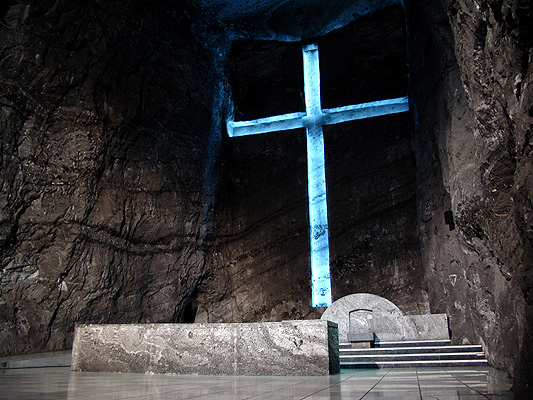
Main altar of the old cathedral, with cross

Years before the underground church was built (around 1932), the miners had carved a sanctuary, as a place for their daily prayers asking for protection to the saints before starting to work. In 1950, the construction of a bigger project had begun: the Salt Cathedral which was inaugurated on August 15, 1954, and dedicated to Our Lady of the Rosary, Patron saint of miners. It was compound of three naves and a monumental cross. Part of the galleries were actually carved by the ancient Muisca. However, as the church was carved inside an active mine, structural problems and safety concerns led the authorities to shut it in September 1992. This construction cost of the original church was over 285 million U.S. dollars. The building had 120 m length, 5.500 m^{2} surface and 22 m height. It had six main columns, and a maximum capacity of 8000 people.

The main nave included the monumental cross, which was illuminated from the base up, projecting a large cross-shaped shadow in the ceiling. The right nave included the Stations of the Cross icons and the Rosary chapel, with the Virgin of Rosary Icon (sculpted by Daniel Rodriguez Moreno and later transported to the new cathedral). The left nave included the icons of the birth of Jesus and the baptism of Jesus, with a waterfall symbolising the Jordan River.

=== New cathedral ===
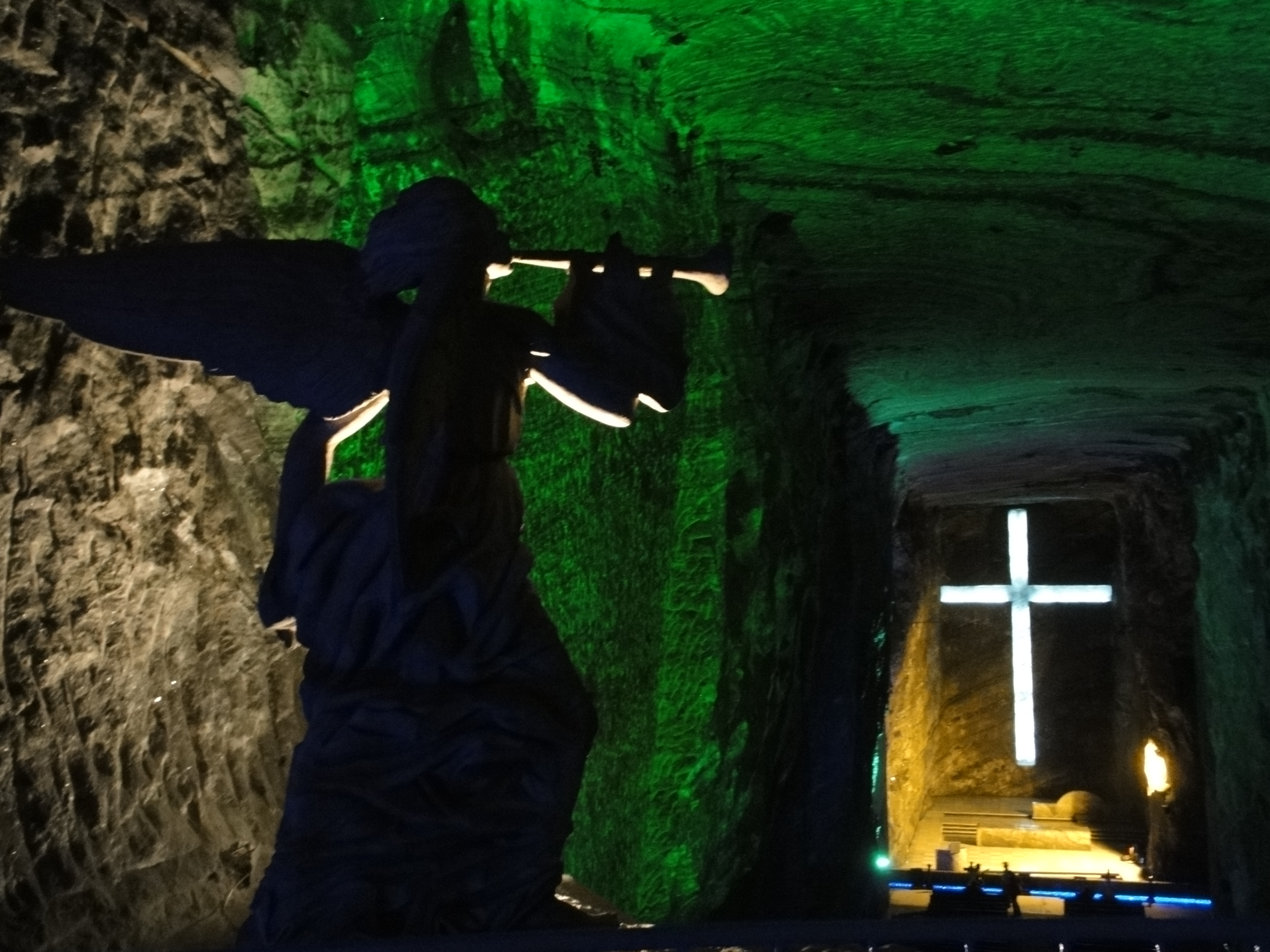
Main altar in the new cathedral with cross and angel sculpture.

The Industrial Investment Institute, together with Salinas Concession and the Colombian Society of Architects opened a contest for the design of the new cathedral, the winner of which was the project presented by Roswell Garavito Pearl which included structural changes in the access tunnel and the dome.

In 1991 the construction of a new cathedral was undertaken, 200.0 feet under the older one. This new Cathedral was inaugurated on December 16, 1995. Its various corridors and sanctuaries were achieved by making small but significant additions to the caves left behind by previous mining operations.

The main sections of the building are:

- The Stations of the Cross: At the entrance of the church, there are 14 small chapels, representing the Stations of the Cross, which illustrate the events of Jesus' last journey. Each station has a cross and several kneeling platforms carved into the halite structure.
- The Dome: Located at the end of the main descending entrance ramp. From here, the visitor descends to the bas relief cross chambers, the balcony and the Narthex labyrinth.
- The three naves: They are interconnected by a crack, symbolising the birth and death of Christ. Copies of Creation of Adam and Pietá can be seen.

Four large cylindric columns represent the Four Evangelists

The cathedral has an electrical generator and access for vehicles to the inner space (for emergencies only).

== Salt Park ==
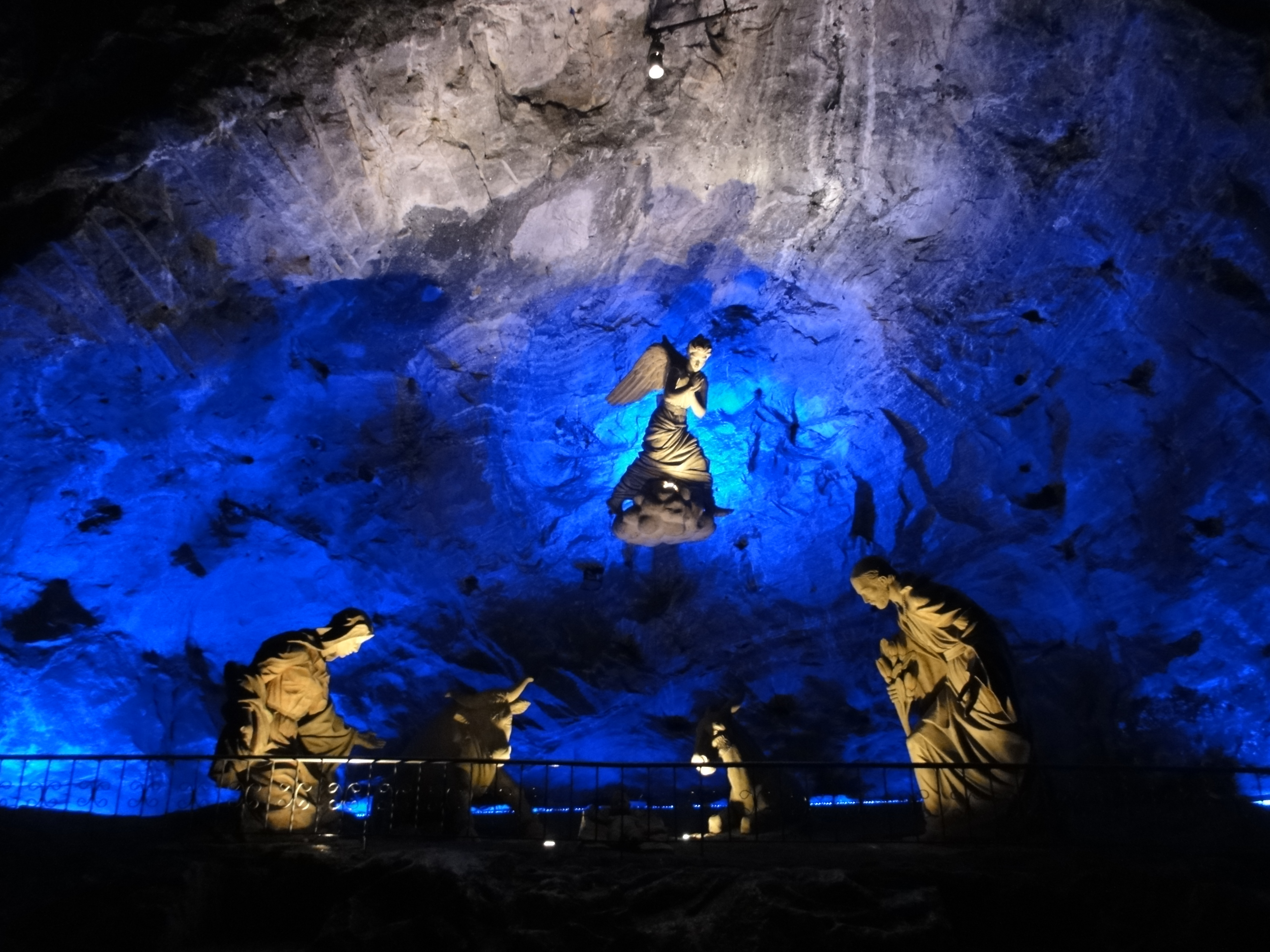
Holy Family sculpture.

The cathedral is within a larger complex, Parque de la Sal (Salt Park), which also includes a museum of mining, mineralogy, geology and natural resources. The Salt Park covers an area of 32 hectares (79 acres). Visitors can observe pieces of art, depictions of the mining process, geology displays, educational exhibitions about environmental friendly mining and sustainable development

The main places at the park are:

- The Sacred Axis, a square with a halite hand carved cross (4.2 metres (14 ft) height)
- The Salt Dome
- The mine
- The Brine Museum, where visitors learn about the extraction process of salt from the halite. Also, exhibitions of the geological studies, engineering and architecture process in the creation of the cathedral can be seen.
- The Reservoir
- The Forests
- The Salt auditorium.

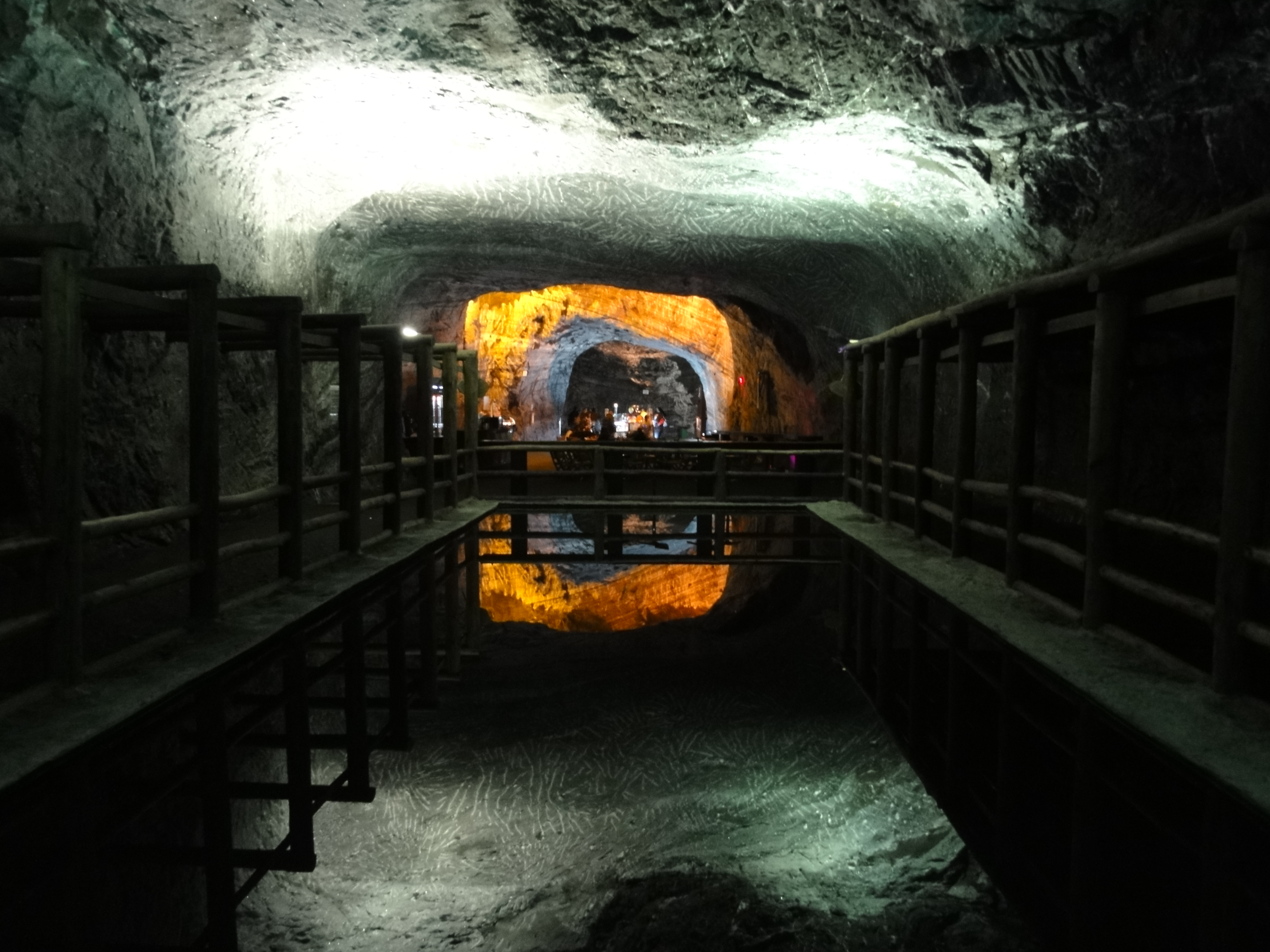
Water "Mirror".

== See also ==
- Nemocón, neighbouring salt mine to the northeast
- Bochnia Salt Mine, southern Poland, central Europe
- Wieliczka Salt Mine, near Kraków in Poland, central Europe
- Khewra Salt Mine, in Punjab, Pakistan
- Kartchner Caverns State Park in Arizona, United States
- Grand Roc in Savoie, France, southern Europe
- Chełm Chalk Tunnels, Poland, central Europe
- Frasassi Caves, Ancona in Italy, southern Europe
- Salina Turda, Transylvania, Romania
- List of colossal sculptures in situ
