= Chełm Chalk Tunnels =

Chalk mine in Poland

Coordinates: 51°07′59″N 23°28′17″E

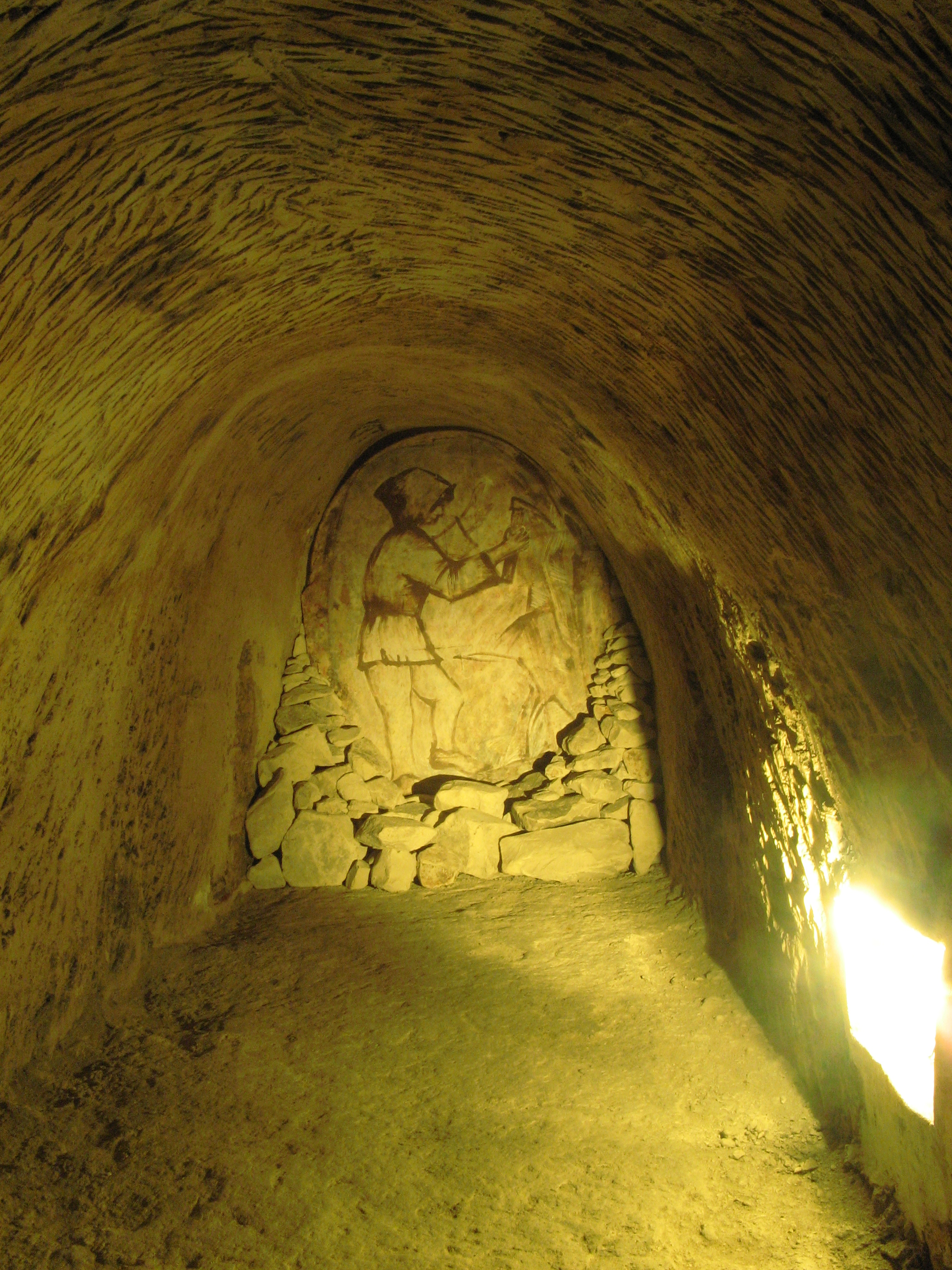
Interior of the chalk tunnels

The Chełm Chalk Tunnels (in Polish Chełmskie podziemia kredowe) are a system of tunnels dug into the chalk under the city of Chełm in eastern Poland. The tunnelling began in the Middle Ages for chalk mining and was discontinued in the 19th century. The tunnels also served Chełm's inhabitants as shelters during raids, wars and pillage. The system is now open solely for tourists. In total, the network of tunnels stretches for around 15 kilometres (9 miles).

== History ==
The Chełm Chalk Tunnels are unique in Europe and even the world. Chełm is a small town, one of the oldest in the Lublin region of Poland, in the east of the country. The chalk tunnels came into being as a result of the exploitation of rich chalk deposits which lie under the surface.

Starting in the Middle Ages, for hundreds of years, under Chełm's old city buildings enormous pits were dug from residents' cellars. The chalk was dug out by the inhabitants of Chełm, who took it straight from their cellars, and then sold it. After some time the corridors linked up, creating an underground system of corridors. Large chambers, called 'halls', came into being as a result of the unplanned connecting of many pits, which existed on several levels — even 20 metres below street level.

In the 19th century it was decided to terminate chalk extraction because the tunnels began to endanger inhabitant safety. After many years, during which the galleries were penetrated only by treasure hunters, it was resolved to use the tunnels for tourism. The first attempts were made in the interwar period when the tunnels were rediscovered while the municipal water supply system was being built. Unfortunately, plans to make the chalk galleries a tourist attraction were not implemented. The planned route (300 metres long) was destroyed during the Nazi occupation of the city, during which Chełm's tunnels also served as a shelter for the persecuted Jewish population.

After World War II, increased road traffic through the city centre in the 1960s led to many construction disasters. The renovation of the tunnels began after an accident, which took place on one of Chełm's streets in the '70s. One of the corridors collapsed under the pressure of a truck driving through the street. Nobody was hurt, but this accident became a reason for excavation, which led to many corridors being discovered. Many tunnels are undiscovered because of the lack of money and high risk. To this day there is no entry to the square under which there are tunnels, because of the risk of collapse.

After selected sections of the corridors were adapted for tourism in the 1970s, the undergrounds were opened to visitors. The present-day tourist route was given its final form only in 1985. It runs through three underground complexes of corridors in the Church of Holy Apostles The Messengers, under the Old City Market Square.

== Visiting ==
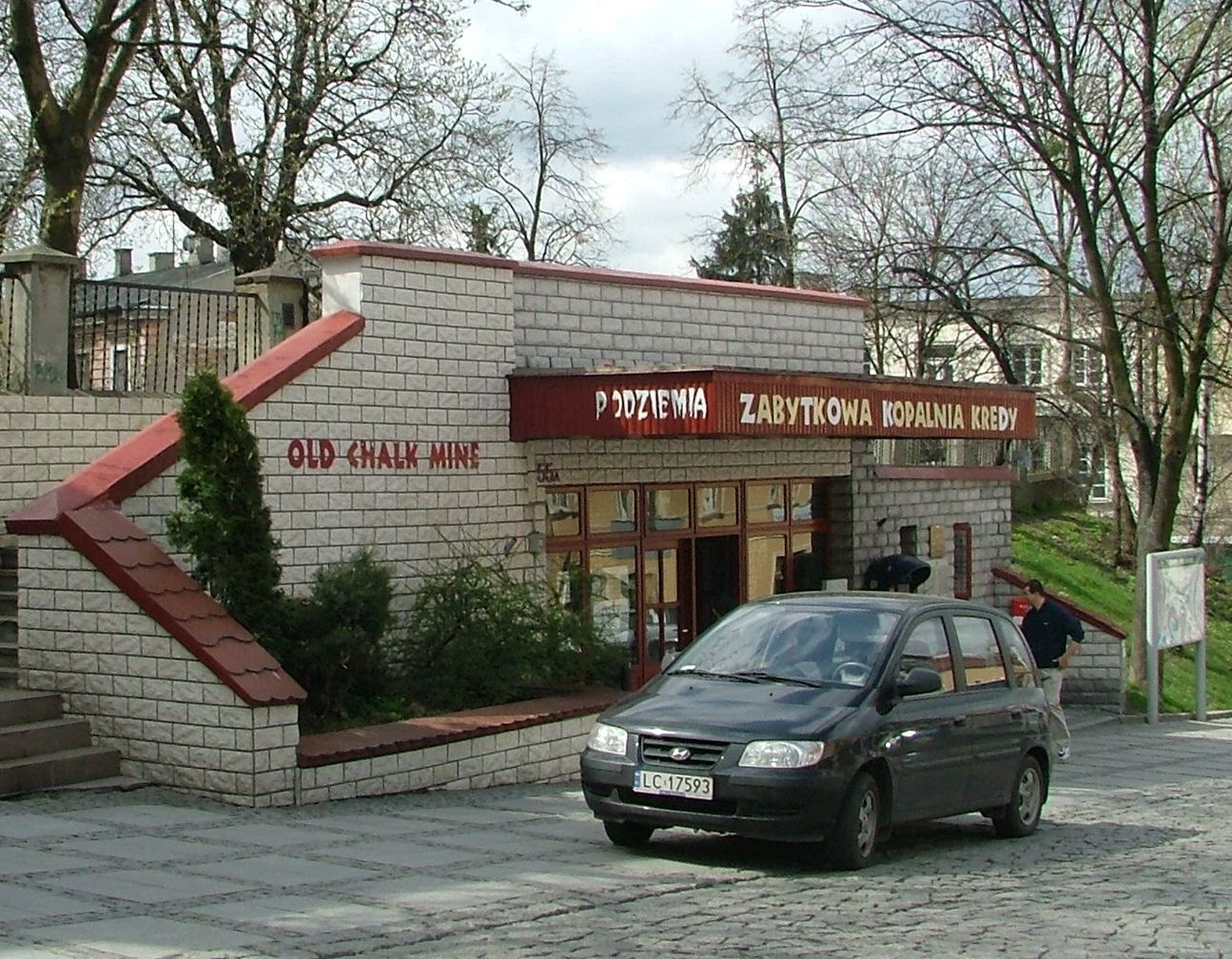
The Chełm Chalk Tunnels

While visiting the nearly two km route, which tourists cover in about 50 minutes, one can observe exhibitions of geological, archaeological and historical interest. Even today there are pits being discovered, which make the chalk undergrounds full of riddles, surprises and mysteries.

The underground tourist route is safe for visitors, complete with electric lighting and constant temperature. In 1994 it was entered into the register of historical monuments as a unique heritage of chalk quarrying.

The chalk undergrounds are thought to measure up to 15 km (9 mi) in length — they even reach outside the city border. Even now it is not certain where the chalk tunnels end. The ambient temperature, independent from the weather outside, is 9 Celsius and the humidity is about 80%.

== Tales and legends ==
Tales and legends about the chalk tunnels have been circulating from time immemorial. The most widely known is the legend of the white bear:

In the pre-Christian times on Chełm Hill under three huge oak trees, in a chalk cave, lived a powerful white bear. It was the terror of the neighbourhood. One day when it went hunting, people built a temple at the entrance to his cavern and lit an everlasting fire. The bear came back and was so transfixed by the brightness of the holy fire that it sank into the undergrounds. From then on, a huge white bear saw to the safety of the fire and the priestesses taking care of it. Only when the disaster loomed over the Chełm land did it leave the caverns. On one occasion savage invaders burned down the settlement and wanted to capture the holy fire. When the defenders, being heavily outnumbered, had yielded to the enemy, the white bear appeared and routed the invaders. Then, tired from fighting he paused for a moment among three oak trees and the setting sun thankfully painted gold the trees, the animal and surroundings. Since then the white bear among three oak trees has been the emblem of Chełm.

== See also ==
- Bochnia Salt Mine, southern Poland, central Europe
- Wieliczka Salt Mine, near Kraków in Poland, central Europe
- Khewra Salt Mine, in Punjab, Pakistan
- Kartchner Caverns State Park in Arizona, the United States
- Grand Roc in Savoie, France, southern Europe
- Salt Cathedral of Zipaquirá, in Zipaquirá, Cundinamarca, Colombia, South America
- Frasassi Caves, Ancona in Italy, southern Europe
