= Whetstone Mountains =

Landform in Cochise County, Arizona

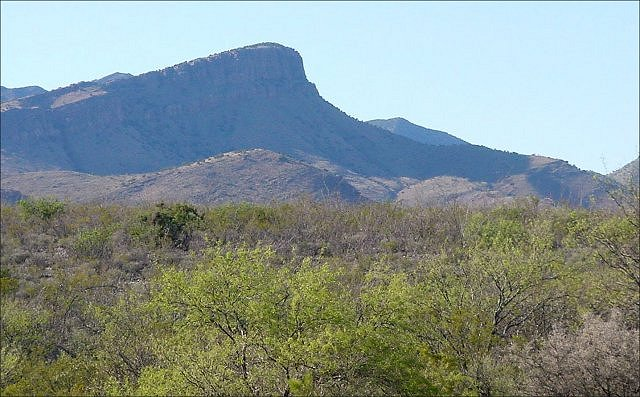

Highest point
- Peak: Apache Peak
- Elevation: 7,711 ft (2,350 m)

Dimensions
- Length: 14 mi (23 km) N-S
- Width: 9 mi (14 km) E-W

Geography
- Country: United States
- State: Arizona
- Region: Northwestern Chihuahuan Desert
- Municipalities: Benson and Sierra Vista
- Range coordinates: 31°48′41″N 110°25′07″W
- Borders on: San Pedro River, San Pedro Valley, I-10, Mule Mountains and Huachuca Mountains

The Whetstone Mountains are a range of mountains in Cochise County, southeastern Arizona.

The Opata called the mountains Babocomari, a name still attached to the nearby Babocomari River. The Spanish continued the name as Sierra del Babocomari. American Colonel Benjamin Bonneville reporting on an inspection tour of the area in May 1859, gave the mountains their current name, because they contain a deposit of a hard fine-grained rock named Novaculite, that could be used as whetstones to sharpen cutlery and tools.

== Geography ==
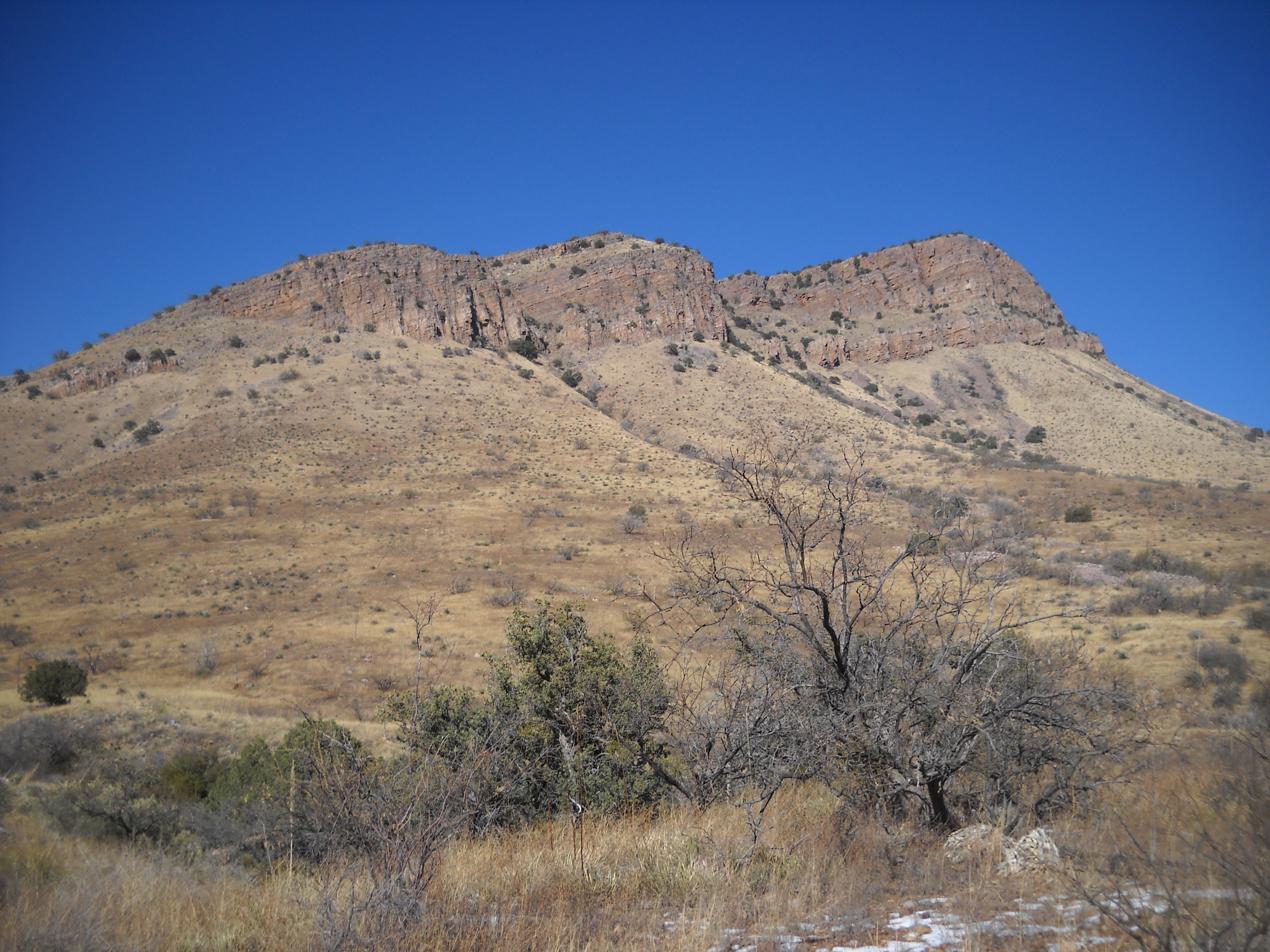
Whetstone Mountains

The range is located south of Interstate 10, between the Santa Rita Mountains to the west, and the Dragoon Mountains to the east. Higher elevations of the major ranges in the region are in the Madrean Sky Islands ecoregion, with sky island habitats.

Located within the Coronado National Forest, the Whetstone Mountains are in its Sierra Vista Recreation Area, with access via hiking trails.

Kartchner Caverns State Park is in the eastern foothills of the Whetstone Mountains, on Arizona State Route 90. The trailhead for the Foothills Loop Trail is in the park.

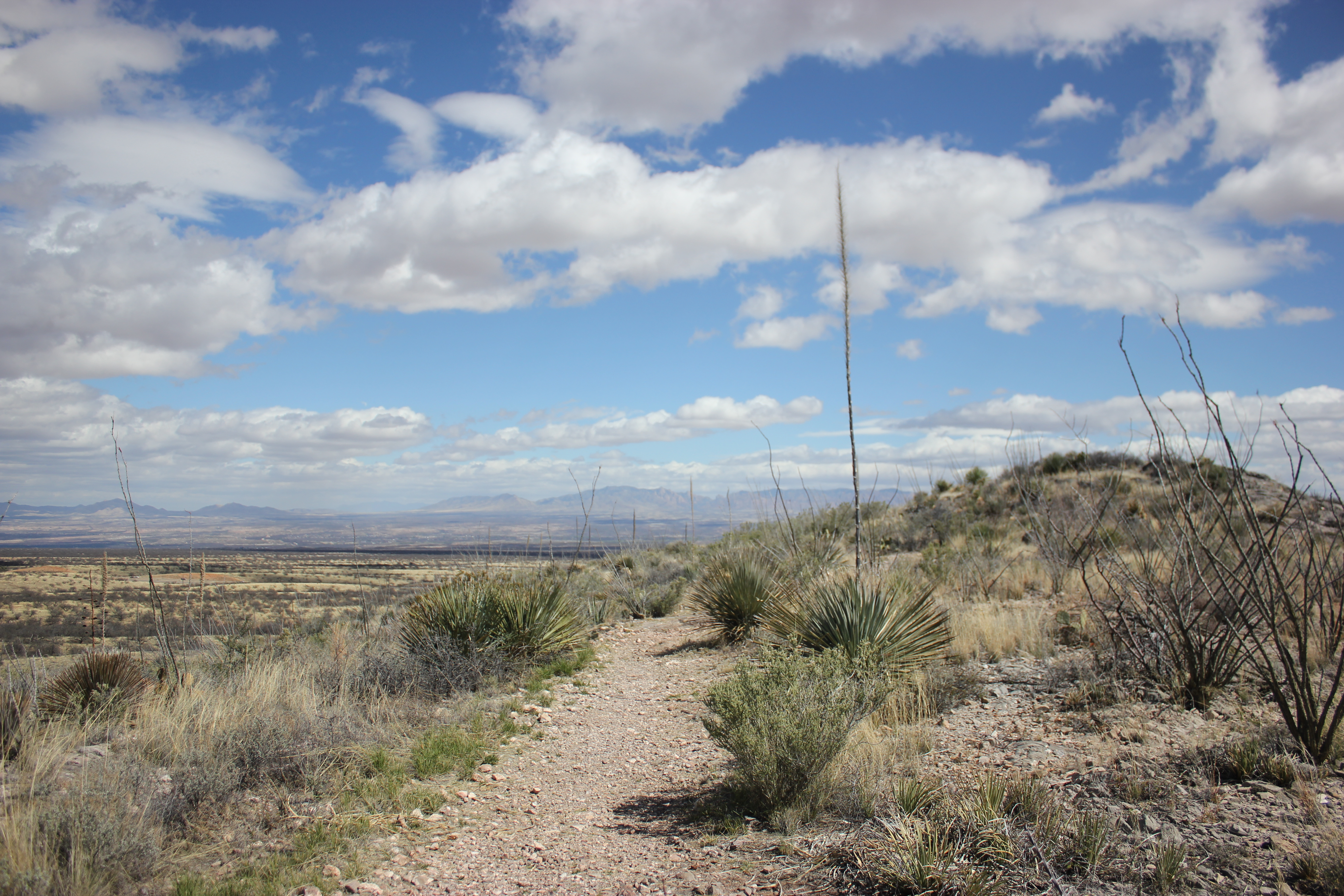
Foothills Loop Trail in the Whetstone Mountains foothills

=== Peaks ===
Peaks in the range include:

- Apache Peak, 7,711 feet (2,350 m)
- French Peak, 7,675 feet (2,339 m)
- Granite Peak, 7,420 feet (2,260 m) — southern section.
- Cottonwood Peak, 7,100 feet (2,200 m) — northeast section.
- East Peak, 6,681 feet (2,036 m) — eastern section.

== History ==
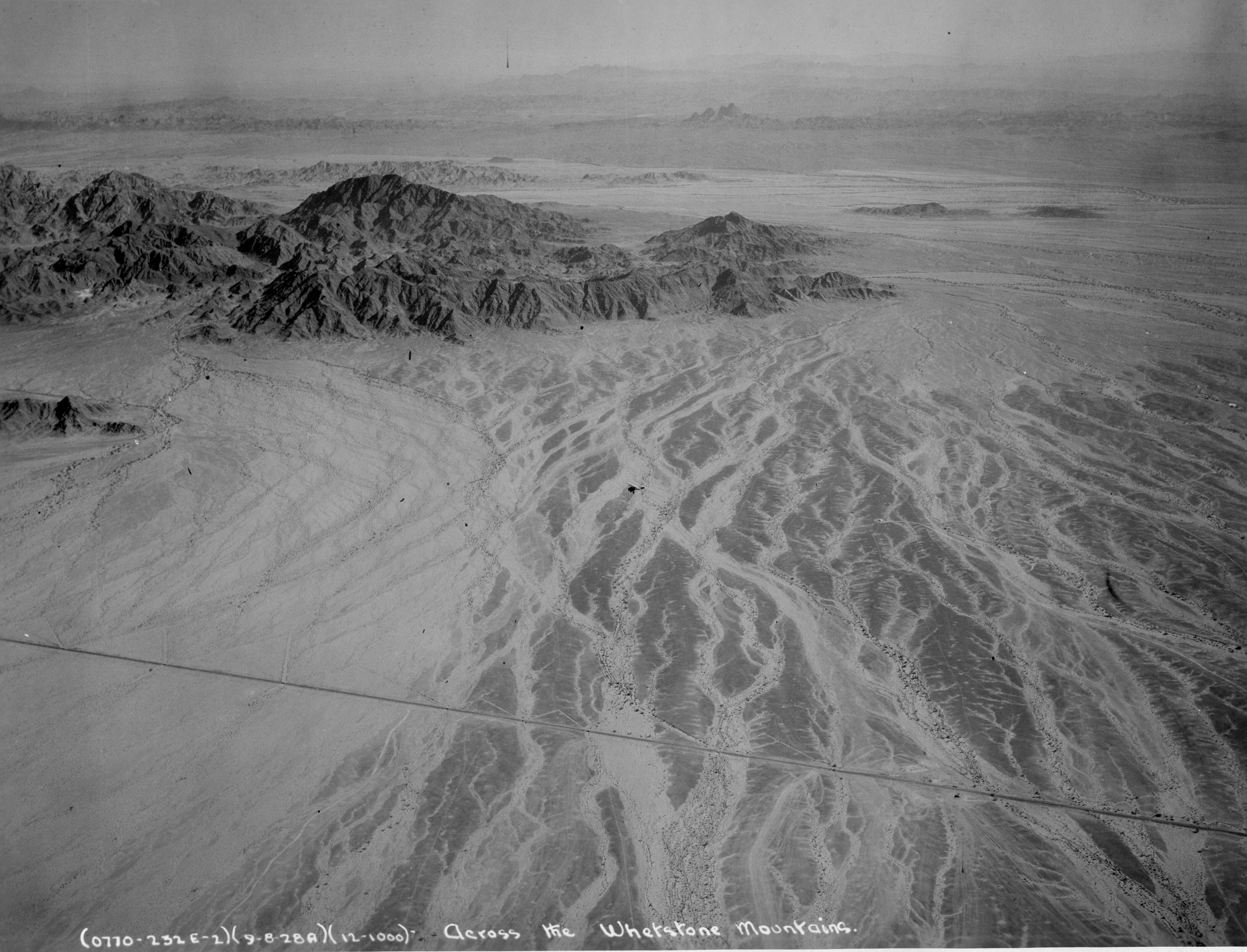
Across the Whetstone Mountains

Iron Springs, within the Whetstones is where Wyatt Earp fought in a gunfight during the Earp Vendetta Ride, 1882.

In 1994 two University of Arizona students discovered the bones of a previously unknown dinosaur in the Whetstones. This plant-eating sauropod was 49 feet (15 m) in length, 26 feet (7.9 m) tall, and estimated to weigh 35 short tons (32,000 kg). In 2018 the Sonorasaurus was named the official dinosaur of Arizona.

== See also ==
- Duality of Man (climb) in the Dry Canyon area of the Whetstone Mountains
