= Bochnia Salt Mine =

Salt mine (Bochnia, Poland)

UNESCO World Heritage Site
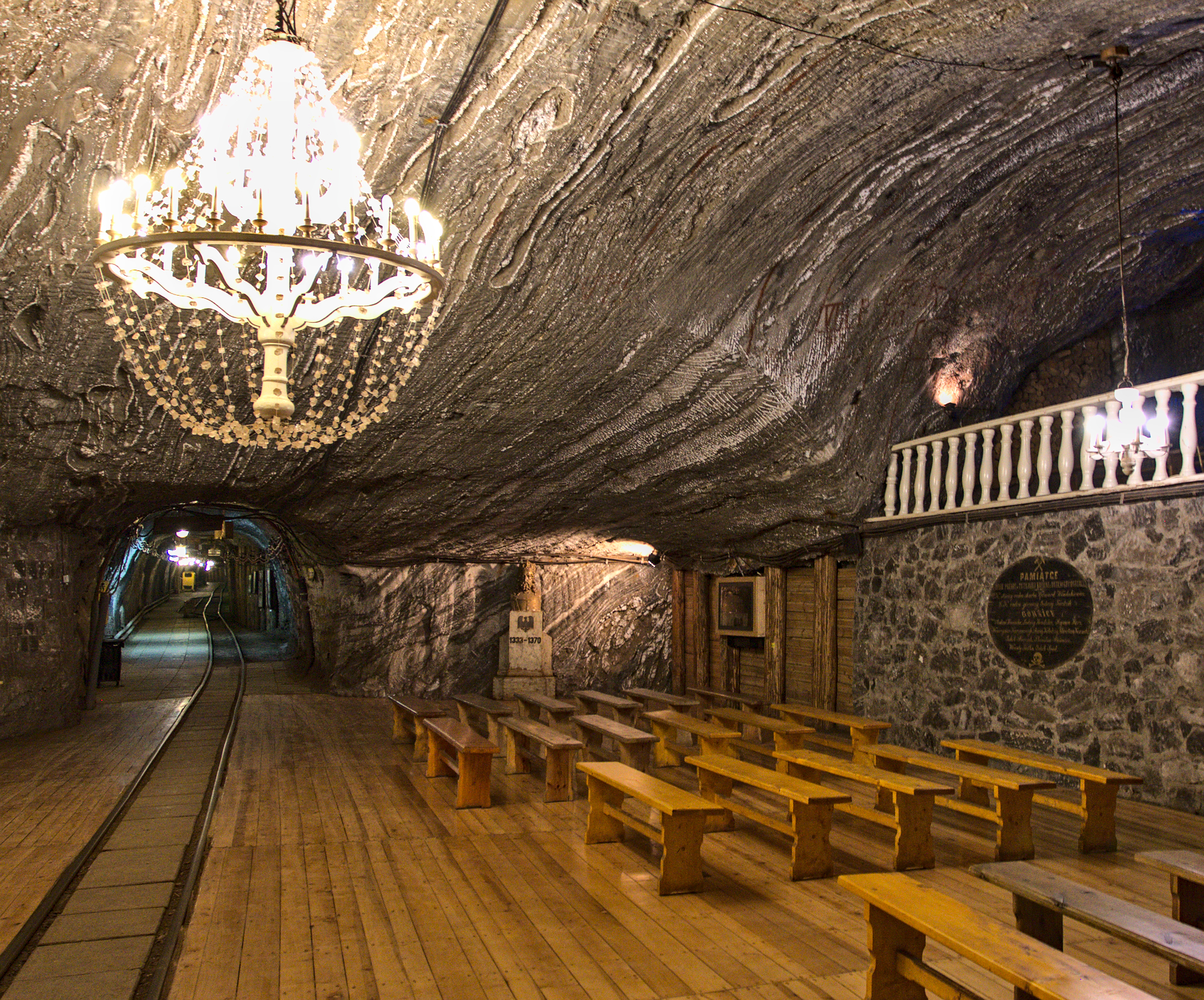
- Underground church created in early 18th century

- Location within Lesser Poland Voivodeship Location within Poland
- Location: Bochnia, Bochnia County, Lesser Poland Voivodeship, Poland
- Part of: Wieliczka and Bochnia Royal Salt Mines
- Criteria: Cultural: (iv)
- Reference: 32ter-002
- Inscription: 1978 (2nd Session)
- Extensions: 2008, 2013
- Area: 135.4 ha (335 acres)
- Buffer zone: 322.6 ha (797 acres)
- Website: bochnia-mine.eu
- Coordinates: 49°58′09″N 20°25′03″E

The Bochnia Salt Mine (Polish: Kopalnia soli Bochnia) in Bochnia, Poland, is one of the oldest salt mines in the world and is the oldest commercial company in Poland. The Bochnia salt mine was established in 1248 after salt had been discovered there in the 12th and 13th centuries and became part of the royal mining company, Żupy krakowskie (Kraków Salt Works). In 1990, the mine ceased producing salt but remained a tourist attraction. The mine is on the UNESCO list.

In 1981 the Bochnia salt mine was declared a heritage monument. It is one of Poland's official national Historic Monuments (Pomnik historii), as designated on 6 October 2000 and is overseen by the National Heritage Board of Poland. The chapel in the mine has train tracks running through it.

== History ==
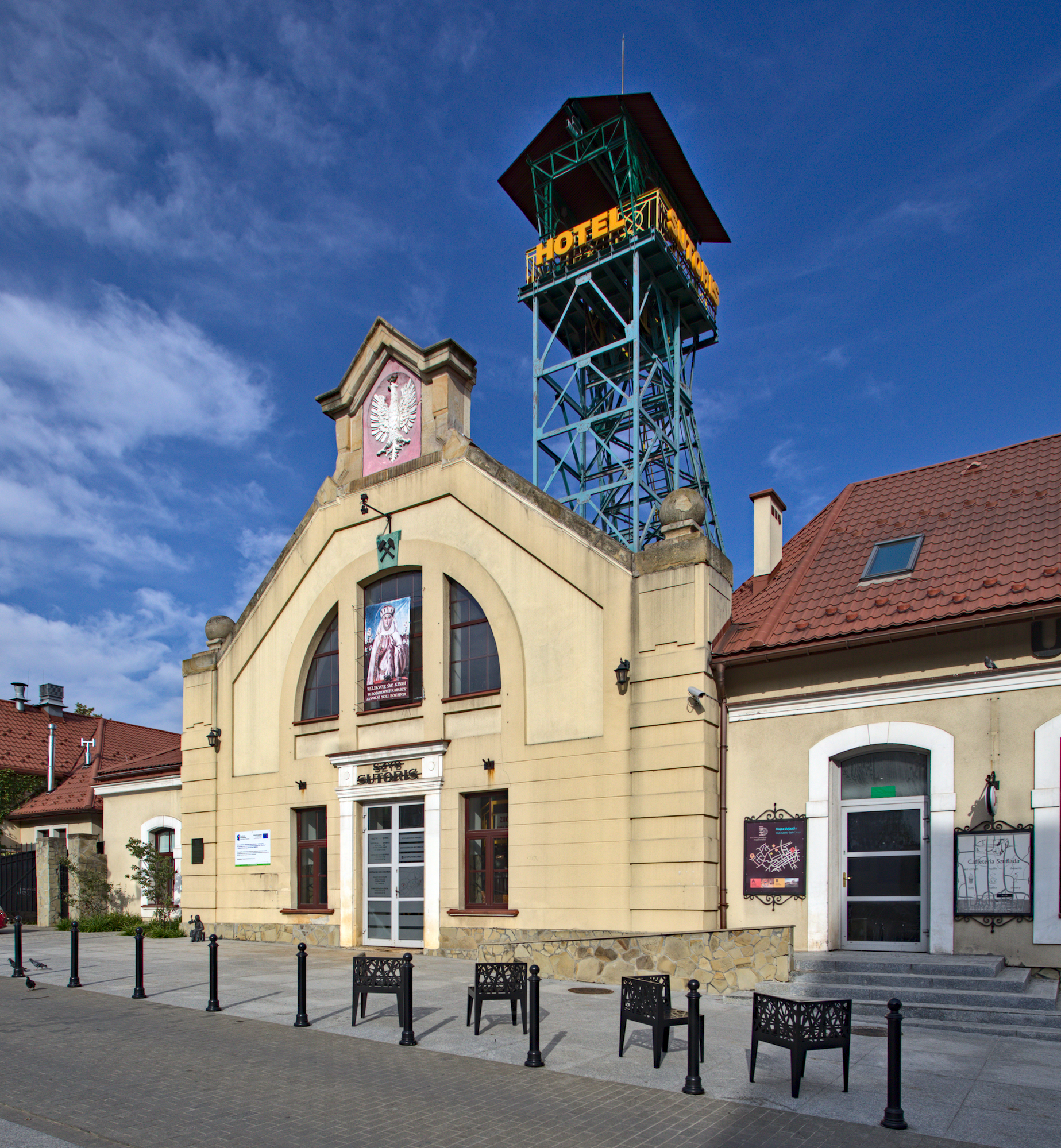
Entrance with Sutoris headframe

The mine shafts measure 4.5 kilometres (2.8 mi) in length at about 330–468 metres (1,083–1,535 ft) in depth below the surface, at 16 levels.

In 2013, the mine was added to the UNESCO World Heritage List as an extension of the Wieliczka Salt Mine inscription of 1978.

=== August Passage ===
The August Passage is the main communication and transportation route in the mine. It runs from the east to the west of the mine, connecting in a straight line the bottom ends of the Campi and Sutoris shafts. It is at a depth of 176 metres (577 ft) from the top of the Sutoris shaft and 212 metres (696 ft) counting from the top of the Campi shaft. The August Passage was initially called the Long Stove (Polish: Piec Długi). Its first part, extending between the Rabsztyn Chute and a Campi Shaft, was built from 1723 to 1743, in accordance with a design by Jan Gottfried Borlach. His great achievement was to regulate routes in the mine by ensuring their straightening and leveling. As a result of this, over the next decades, the August Passage was able to reach a length of nearly 3 km (2 mi).

Excavated chambers, shafts and passages form an underground town, which is open to sightseers. The largest of the preserved chambers has been converted into a sanatorium.

=== Ważyn Chamber ===
The Ważyn Chamber was named after the administrator (podżupek) Andrzej Ważyński. The depth of this chamber, the biggest in Bochnia Salt Mine, is 248 metres (814 ft); its length is 255 metres (837 ft); its maximum width is 14.4 metres (47 ft); and its maximum height is 7.2 metres (24 ft). The chamber uses no supporting pillars. Salt from Ważyn chamber was extracted from 1697 until the 1950s. For the purposes of creating a sanatorium, these old pits were expanded with a loading-hauling-dumping (LHD) unit machine. This work took place until 1984. Thanks to them, the Ernest Chute from the 17th century impressively presents itself on the stripped chamber's roof.

The Ważyn chamber has a specific microclimate, with a constant temperature between 14–16 °C (57–61 °F), high humidity (about 70%) and favourable ionisation of the air saturated by sodium chloride and valuable microelements, like magnesium, manganese and calcium. The air in the chamber is distinguished by its purity. The chamber is equipped with beds: up to 300 people can sleep here. The other parts of Ważyn Chamber are fields for playing volleyball, basketball and handball. There are also restaurant and conference facilities.

== See also ==
- Wieliczka Salt Mine, near Kraków in Poland, central Europe
- Khewra Salt Mine, in Punjab, Pakistan
- Kartchner Caverns State Park in Arizona, the United States
- Grand Roc in Savoie, France, southern Europe
- Salt Cathedral of Zipaquirá, in Zipaquirá, Cundinamarca, Colombia, South America
- Chełm Chalk Tunnels, Poland, central Europe
- Frasassi Cave, Ancona in Italy, southern Europe
