= Wieliczka Salt Mine =

Polish salt mine operated for 700 years

UNESCO World Heritage Site
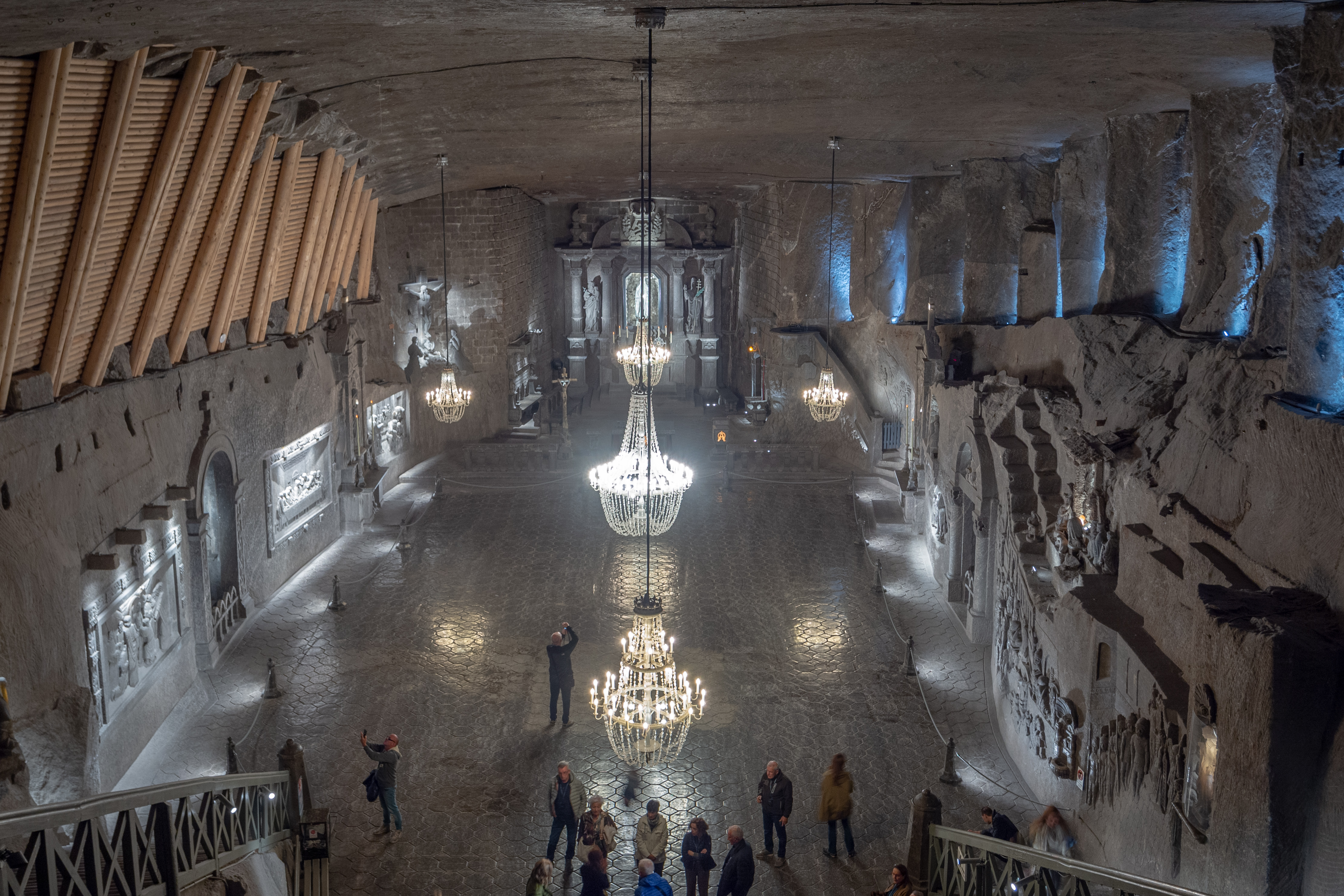
- St. Kinga's Chapel, deep in the Wieliczka salt mine (view as a 360° interactive panorama)

- Location within Poland Location within Lesser Poland Voivodeship
- Location: Wieliczka, Kraków County, Lesser Poland Province, Poland
- Part of: Wieliczka and Bochnia Royal Salt Mines
- Includes: Salt Mine in Wieliczka; Saltworks Castle in Wieliczka
- Criteria: Cultural: (iv)
- Reference: 32ter
- Inscription: 1978 (2nd Session)
- Extensions: 2008, 2013
- Endangered: 1989–1998
- Area: 970 ha (2,400 acres)
- Buffer zone: 250 ha (620 acres)
- Website: www.wieliczka-saltmine.com
- Coordinates: 49°58′45″N 20°3′50″E

The Wieliczka Salt Mine (Polish: Kopalnia soli Wieliczka) is a salt mine in the town of Wieliczka, near Kraków in southern Poland.

From Neolithic times, sodium chloride (table salt) was produced there from the upwelling brine. The Wieliczka salt mine, excavated from the 13th century, produced table salt continuously until 1996, as one of the world's oldest operating salt mines. Throughout its history, the royal salt mine was operated by the Żupy Krakowskie (Kraków Salt Mines) company.

Due to falling salt prices and mine flooding, commercial salt mining was discontinued in 1996.

The Wieliczka Salt Mine is now an official Polish Historic Monument (Pomnik Historii) and a UNESCO World Heritage Site. Its attractions include the shafts and labyrinthine passageways, displays of historic salt-mining technology, an underground lake, four chapels and numerous statues carved by miners out of the rock salt, and more recent sculptures by contemporary artists.

== Description ==
The Wieliczka Salt Mine reaches a depth of 327 metres (1,073 ft), and extends via horizontal passages and chambers for over 287 kilometres (178 miles). The rock salt is naturally of varying shades of grey, resembling unpolished granite rather than the white crystalline substance that might be expected.

The mine features an underground lake, exhibits on the history of salt mining, and a 3.5-kilometre (2.2-mile) visitors' route (less than 2 percent of the mine passages' total length) including statues carved from the rock salt at various times.

== History ==
The first documentation of the mine dates from 1044, when Casimir I granted a privilege. Monks collected salt around that time.

Since the 13th century, brine welling up to the surface had been collected and processed for its sodium chloride (table-salt) content. In this period, wells began to be sunk, and the first shafts to be dug to extract the rock salt. From the late 13th to the early 14th century, the Saltworks Castle was built. Wieliczka is now home to the Kraków Saltworks Museum.

King Casimir III the Great contributed greatly to the development of the Wieliczka Salt Mine, granting it many privileges and taking the miners under his care. In 1363 he founded a hospital near the salt mine. It is said that he turned a Poland of wood into a Poland of stone due to the great amount of wood from the neighbouring forests used as scaffolding and supports. This has brought huge revenues to the state.

By 1871, the mine was considered one of the most productive in the world. Scientific American identified three different qualities of salt around this time. Green salt contained clay and was opaque. Spiza salt was sandy and crystalline. Szybik salt was the purest and most crystalline.

Over the period of the mine's operation, many chambers were dug and various technologies were added, such as the Hungarian horse treadmill and the Saxon treadmill for hauling salt to the surface. By the late 1890s, machine drills and blasting were used to extract salt. In 1915, salt mine workers were paid the equivalent of 20 cents per day. During World War II, the mine was used by the occupying Germans as an underground facility for war-related manufacturing. Between August and October 1944, Jewish concentration camp prisoners were put to hard labour in the salt mines.

In 1978 the Wieliczka Salt Mine was placed on the original UNESCO list of World Heritage Sites. The mine was on the List of World Heritage in Danger from 1989 to 1998. This was due to the threat of serious damage being done to the sculptures from humidity caused by artificial ventilation introduced in the later 19th century.

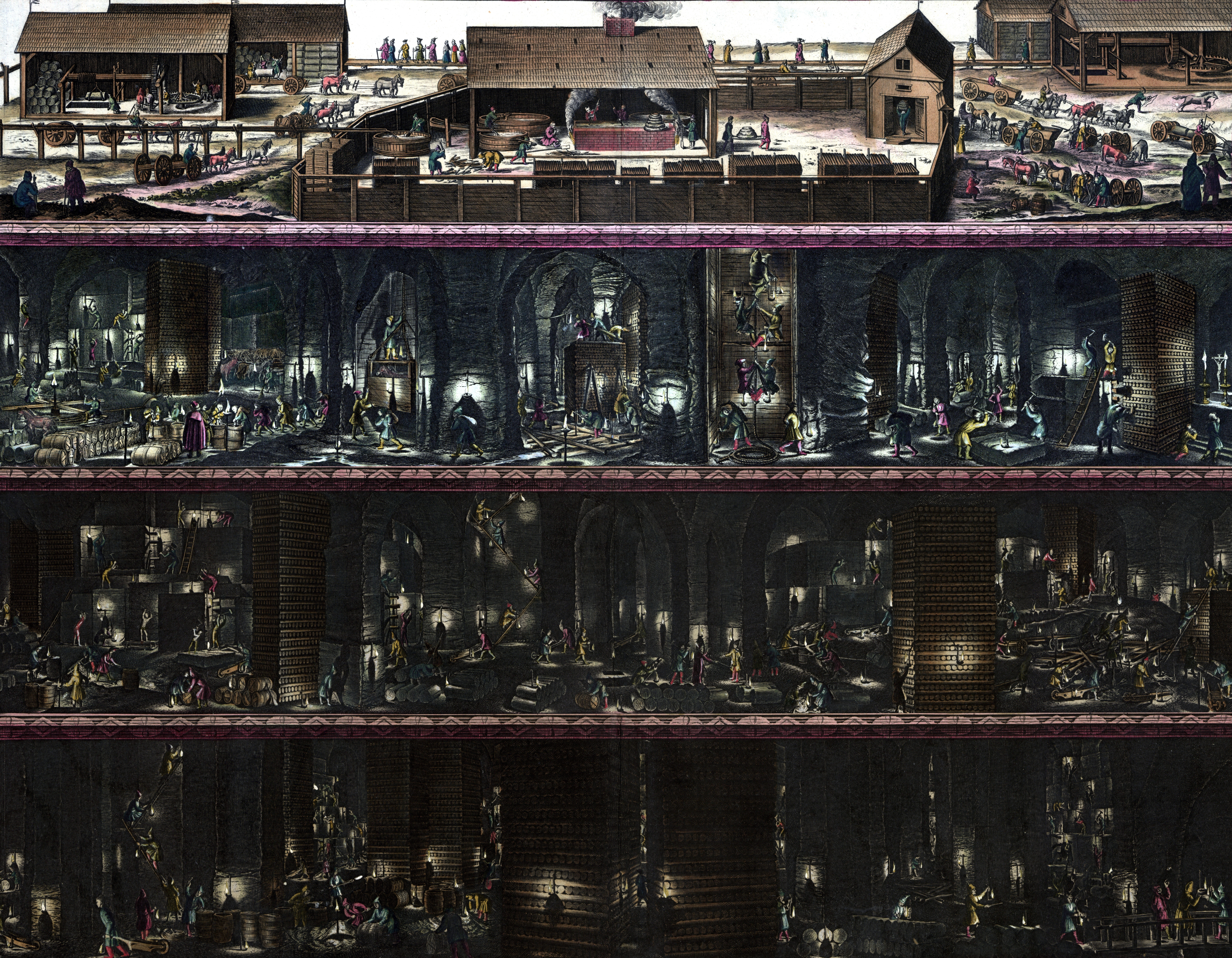
Surface and underground views of Wieliczka town and salt mine, engraved in 1645 by Willem Hondius

A legend about Princess Kinga of Poland, associated with the Wieliczka mine, tells of a Hungarian princess about to be married to Bolesław V the Chaste, the Prince of Kraków. As part of her dowry, she asked her father, Béla IV of Hungary, for a lump of salt, since salt was prizeworthy in Poland. Her father King Béla took her to a salt mine in Máramaros. She threw her engagement ring from Bolesław in one of the shafts before leaving for Poland. On arriving in Kraków, she asked the miners to dig a deep pit until they come upon a rock. The people found a lump of salt in there and when they split it in two, discovered the princess's ring. Kinga had thus become the patron saint of salt miners in and around the Polish capital.

During the Nazi occupation, several thousand Jews were transported from the forced labour camps in Plaszow and Mielec to the Wieliczka mine to work in the underground armament factory set up by the Germans in March and April 1944. The forced labour camp of the mine was established in St. Kinga Park and had about 1,700 prisoners. However, manufacturing never began as the Soviet offensive was nearing. Some of the machines and equipment were disassembled, including an electrical hoisting machine from the Regis Shaft, and transported to Liebenau in the Sudetes mountains. Part of the equipment was returned after the war, in autumn 1945. The Jews were transported to factories in Litoměřice (Czech Republic) and Linz (Austria).

The mine is one of Poland's official national Historic Monuments (Pomniki historii), as designated in the first round, 16 September 1994. Its listing is maintained by the National Heritage Board of Poland. In 2010 it was successfully proposed that the nearby historic Bochnia Salt Mine (Poland's oldest salt mine) be added to the list of UNESCO World Heritage sites. The two sister salt mines now appear together in the UNESCO list of World Heritage Sites as the "Wieliczka and Bochnia Royal Salt Mines". In 2013 the UNESCO World Heritage Site was expanded by the addition of the Żupny Castle.

== Tourism ==
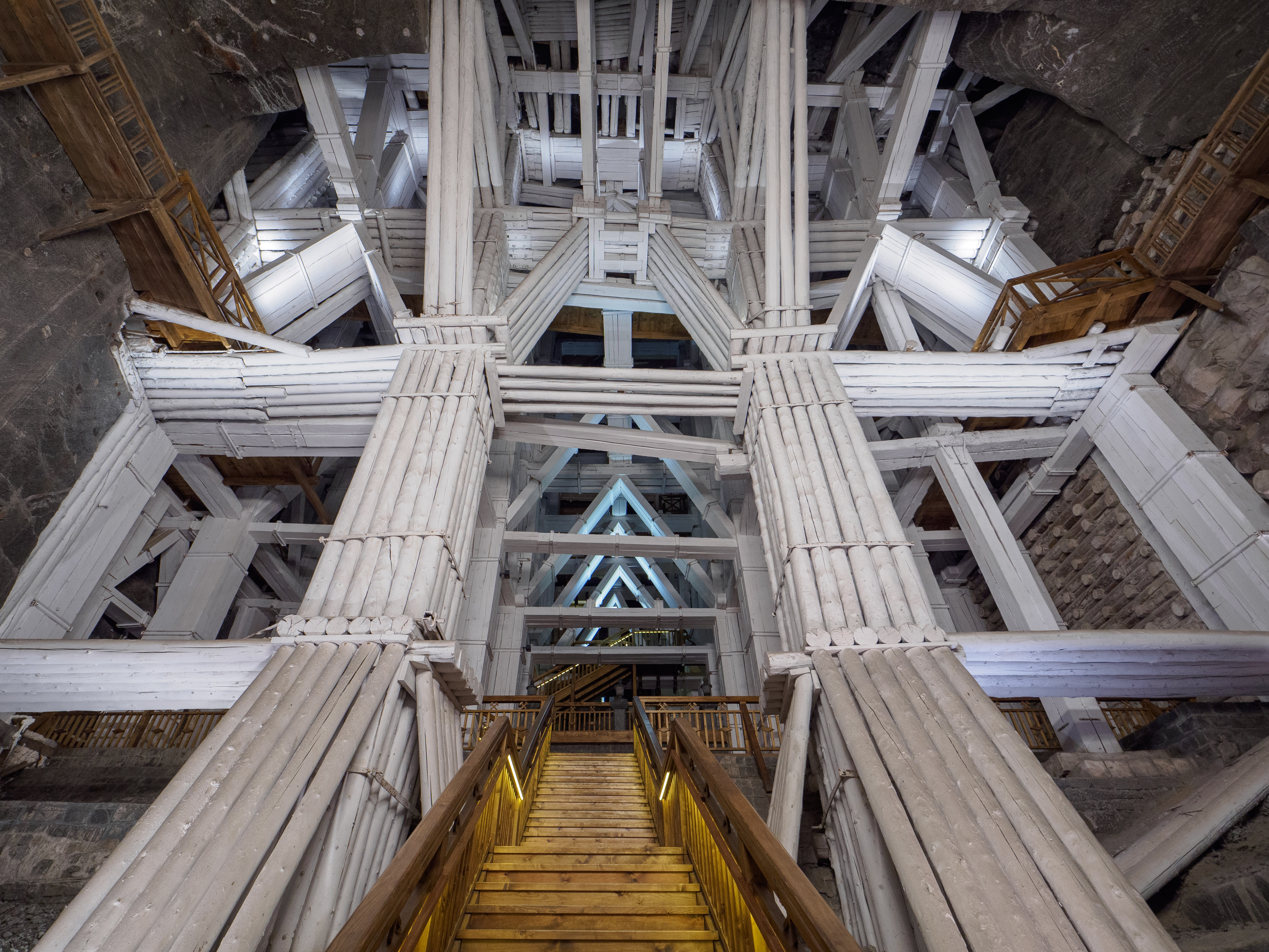
The Michałowice Chamber, the tallest room in the mine, held up by thick wood scaffoldings

The mine is currently one of Poland's official national Historic Monuments (Pomniki historii), whose attractions include dozens of statues and four chapels carved out of the rock salt by the miners. The older sculptures have been supplemented with new carvings made by contemporary artists. About 1.2 million people visit the Wieliczka Salt Mine annually.

Notable visitors to this site have included Nicolaus Copernicus, Johann Wolfgang von Goethe, Alexander von Humboldt, Fryderyk Chopin, Dmitri Mendeleyev, Bolesław Prus, Ignacy Paderewski, Robert Baden-Powell, Jacob Bronowski (who filmed segments of The Ascent of Man in the mine), the von Unrug family (a prominent Polish-German royal family), Karol Wojtyła (later, Pope John Paul II), former U.S. President Bill Clinton, and many others.

The mainstream mine tours are sectioned into the Tourist Route and Museum Route. The Tourist Route consists of the first 3 levels of the mine. It takes around 1.5 h to see the entire 2.2 kilometres long trail. It's famous for St. Kinga Chapel, components of interior design carved in salt and brine lakes, one of which is a space for sound and light show with the music of Frédéric Chopin. Tourists can set off to the Museum Route after sightseeing the Tourist Route. The Museum Route is famous for its unique on the European scale collection of the horse mills, exhibition of salt crystals and monumental chambers such as Maria Teresa and Saurau Chamber. The Museum Route is located entirely on the 3 level of the mine and it takes around 50 minutes to go through the 1.5 kilometres long trail. Visitors can also take the Miners' Route, a 2 kilometres guided tour through mostly unimproved galeries on multiple levels with little to no light. Visitors wear uniforms and helmets, carry their own light source, and must also carry a CO2 scrubbing mask for emergencies.

The St. Kinga Chapel and specific chambers are used for private functions, including weddings. A chamber has walls carved by miners to resemble wood, as in wooden churches built in early centuries. A wooden staircase provides access to the mine's 64-metre (210-foot) level. An elevator (lift) returns visitors to the surface; the elevator holds 36 persons (nine per car) and takes about 30 seconds to make the trip.

== In culture ==
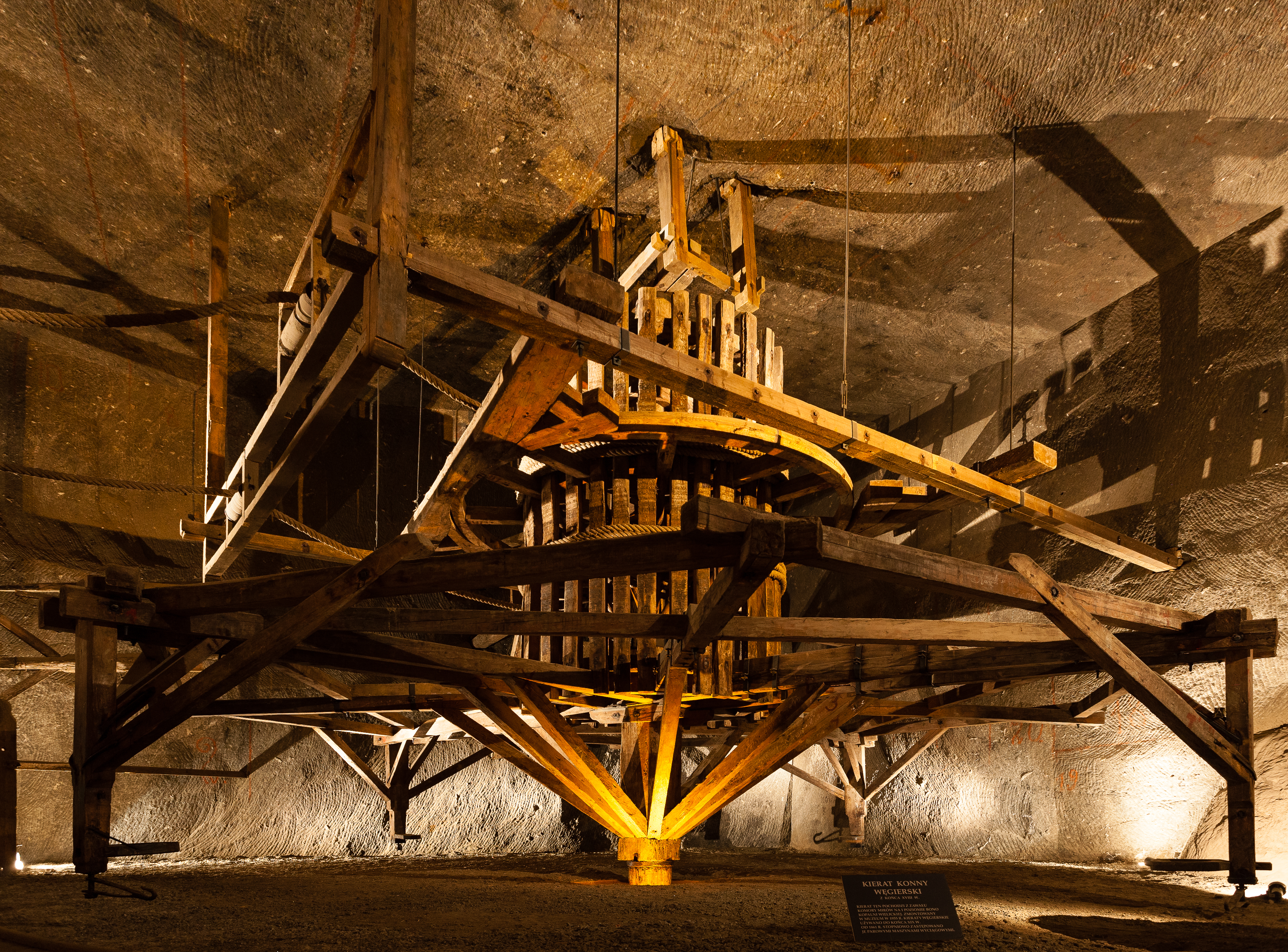
Hungarian horse mill, late 18th century, in Komora Kraj (the Country Chamber)

The earliest writings about the Wieliczka Salt Mine include a description by Adam Schröter: Salinarum Vieliciensium incunda ac vera descriptio. Carmine elegiaco... (1553); augmented edition, Regni Poloniae Salinarum Vieliciensium descriptio. Carmine elegiaco... (1564).

The Polish journalist and novelist Bolesław Prus described his 1878 visit to the salt mine in a series of three articles, "Kartki z podróży (Wieliczka)" ["Travel Notes (Wieliczka)"], in Kurier Warszawski (The Warsaw Courier), 1878, nos. 36–38. Prus scholar Zygmunt Szweykowski writes: "The power of the Labyrinth scenes [in Prus' 1895 historical novel, Pharaoh] stems, among other things, from the fact that they echo Prus' own experiences when visiting Wieliczka." The Wieliczka Salt Mine indeed helped inspire Pharaoh. Prus combined his powerful impressions of the salt mine with the description of the ancient Egyptian Labyrinth, in Book II of Herodotus' Histories, to produce the scenes found in chapters 56 and 63 of his novel.

The 1988 film On the Silver Globe (Polish: Na srebrnym globie) by Andrzej Żuławski was filmed in part in the mines.

In 1995, Preisner's Music, a compilation of film music by Polish composer Zbigniew Preisner, was recorded by Sinfonia Varsovia in the Wieliczka mine's chapel.

In the 1997 Australian television series Spellbinder: Land of the Dragon Lord, the mines were used as the Land of the Moloch.

In 1999, the mine was featured in an episode of the U.S. series Modern Marvels dealing with salt mines.

The 2006 documentary film Wieliczka – Sól ziemi (Wieliczka – The Salt of the Earth) directed by Sadrolin Tam was filmed inside the salt mine.

The mine has appeared on multiple editions of the reality show The Amazing Race, including The Amazing Race Australia 1 (2011), HaMerotz LaMillion 2 (2011-2012), Velyki Perehony (2013), and The Amazing Race 27 (2015).

The 2013 young adult historical fiction novel Prisoner B-3087 by Alan Gratz features the protagonist, teenager Yanek Gruener, a Jewish boy from Kraków who was persecuted by the Nazi Germans during the Holocaust. In chapter thirteen, Yanek was temporarily transferred to Wieliczka on a work detail.

== Virtual tour ==
Wieliczka Salt Mine
Mine entrance with headframe	Saint Barbara, carved into the rock salt	Leonardo's The Last Supper, carved into rock-salt wall	Old corridor
Rock-salt statue of Pope John Paul II	Old winch in the museum	Bottom of St. Kinga's Shaft	Salt-crystal chandelier, St. Kinga's Chapel

== Sister caves ==
- Frasassi Caves (Genga – Marche, Italy)

== See also ==
- Chełm Chalk Tunnels, in Poland
- Grand Roc, France
- Kartchner Caverns State Park, United States
- Khewra Salt Mine, in Punjab, Pakistan
- Kłodawa Salt Mine, in central Poland
- List of registered museums in Poland
- Salt Cathedral of Zipaquirá, Colombia
