= Calcari ad aptici e Saccocoma Formation =

Geologic formation in Camponocecchio, Italy

- Stratigraphic range: Tithonian, 152 Ma
- Type: Group
- Unit of: 'Calcari Diasprigni'
- Thickness: Up to 30 metres (98 ft)

Lithology
- Primary: Limestone and sandstone
- Other: Chert

Location
- Region: Marche
- Country: Italy
- Extent: Camponocecchio and Genga

Type section
- Named by: Fabio Galluzzo & Massimo Santantonio (2002)
- Location: Camponocecchio
- Year defined: 1976/1980

The Calcari ad aptici e Saccocoma Formation, also known as the Saccocoma Formation (known in English as the Haptic limestones and Saccocoma Formation), is a geologic formation in Camponocecchio, Italy that dates back to the Tithonian (152 Ma) - it was first identified in 1976/1980, and was named in 2002. It was probably a marine shale due to the fossil content. Fossils found there include ammonites, cnidarians and the ichthyosaur Gengasaurus, discovered in 1976. Many of the fossils found in this formation are housed at the Spaelaeo-Palaeontologic Museum in Genga.

== Paleofauna ==
Indeterminate ammonites and cnidarians are known from the formation.

- Gengasaurus nicosiai
- Kobya monteneronensis
