= Żupy krakowskie =

Defunct Polish salt mining company

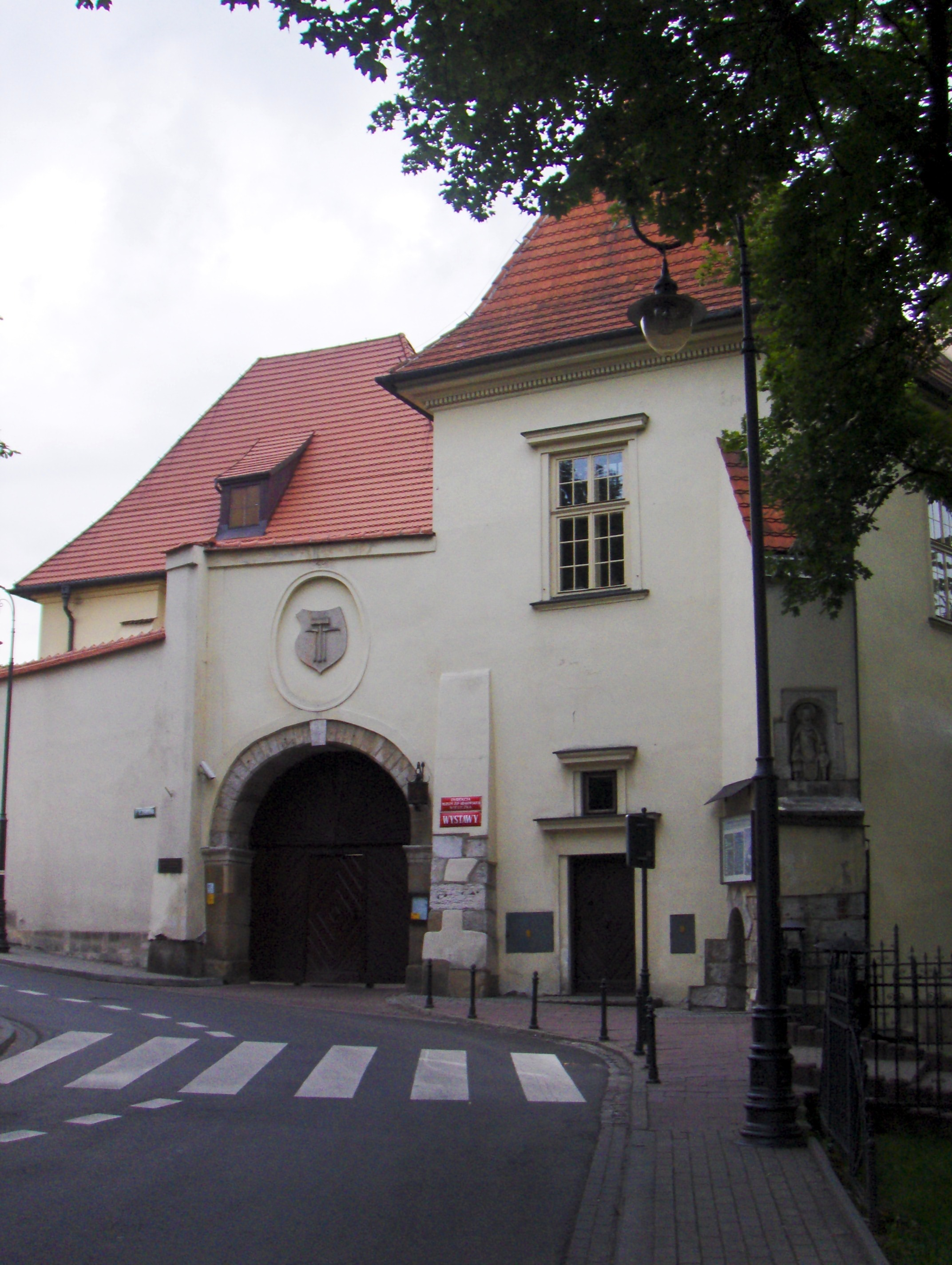
Castle of Żupy krakowskie works in Wieliczka, Poland

Żupy krakowskie was a Polish salt mining company which operated continuously from its inception in the 13th century to the late 20th century. It managed salt mines and salt works in two neighboring towns (known as the Royal Salt Mines collectively), Wieliczka Salt Mine in Wieliczka and Bochnia Salt Mine in Bochnia (city rights, 1253), as well as river salt ports on Vistula and, only in the 17th century, a salt work in Dobiegniewo. The company was created circa 1290 by the Polish Crown, thus giving birth to the largest industrial centre in Europe until the 18th century, according to UNESCO, both in terms of the number of employees and its production volumes.

Żupy krakowskie works ("Żupa" is the Old Polish word for salt mine) was one of the primary sources of income for the Polish Crown until 1772. For most of its existence, it was also one of the largest salt mining enterprises worldwide along with the Alpine salt mines in Hallstatt, Hallein, Hall and Berchtesgaden. It produced of over 30,000 tons a year.

Notably, the castle of the Żupy krakowskie works in Wieliczka is the site of a museum established in 1951, called the Muzeum Żup Krakowskich Wieliczka.

== See also ==
- List of food and beverage museums
