= Genga, Marche =

Genga
- Comune
- Comune di Genga
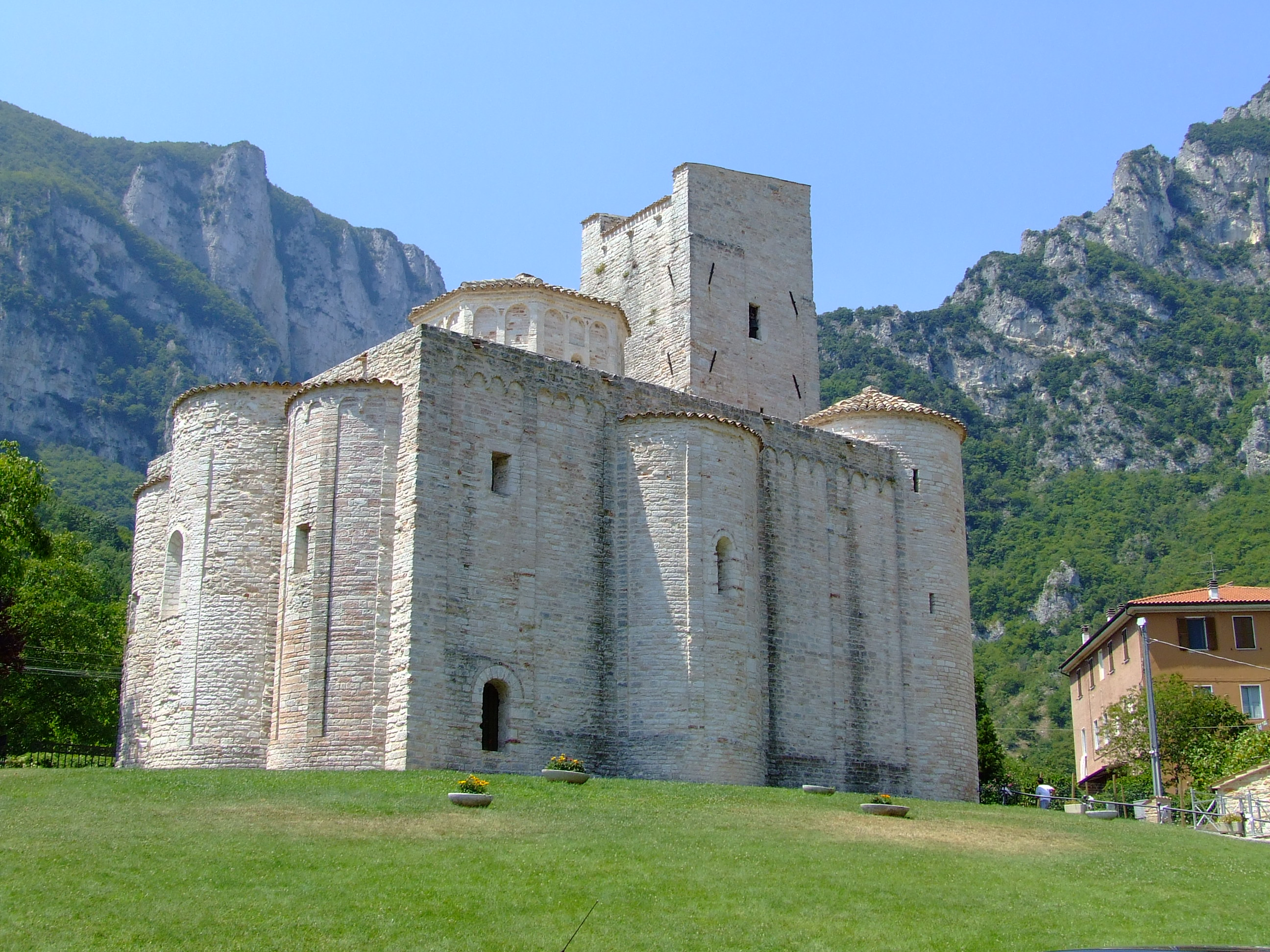
- San Vittore Abbey.

- Location within Italy Location within Marche
- Coordinates: 43°26′N 12°56′E
- Country: Italy
- Region: Marche
- Province: Ancona (AN)
- Frazioni: Avenale, Bivio Filipponi, Camponocecchio, Capolavilla, Casamontanara, Cerqueto, Colcello, Colleponi, Falcioni, Gattuccio, Meleto, Monticelli, Palombare, Pianello, Pierosara, Rocchetta, Rosenga, San Donnino, San Fortunato, San Vittore, Trapozzo, Trinquelli, Vallemania, Valtreara

Government
  - Mayor: Raniero Nepi

Area
  - Total: 72 km^{2} (28 sq mi)
- Elevation: 320 m (1,050 ft)

Population (2008)
  - Total: 1,984
  - Density: 28/km^{2} (71/sq mi)
- Demonym: Gengarini
- Time zone: UTC+1 (CET)
  - Summer (DST): UTC+2 (CEST)
- Postal code: 60040
- Dialing code: 0732
- Patron saint: St. Clemens
- Saint day: November 23
- Website: Official website

Genga is a town and comune of province of Ancona in the Italian region of the Marche, on the Sentino river about 7 kilometres (4 mi) downstream and east of Sassoferrato and 12 kilometres (7 mi) north of Fabriano.

The town is best known as the ancestral home of the noble family of the della Genga, the most famous member of which was Pope Leo XII.

== Main sights ==
- Grotte di Frasassi, they are a karst caves system most famous show caves in Italy.
- the Romanesque abbey at S. Vittore alle Chiuse (11th century).
- the Roman Bridge in the same hamlet, about 8 kilometres (5 mi) southeast of town.
- Museum of the church of San Clemente. It houses a triptych and a 15th-century banner by Antonio da Fabriano.
- Spaelaeo-Palaeontologic Museum, including a famous fossil of an Ichthyosaur known as Gengasaurus found in the area in 1976.

The Frasassi Caves, about 5 kilometres (3 mi) south-southeast, are among the most visited natural curiosities in central Italy.
