= Kartchner Caverns State Park =

State park in Arizona, United States

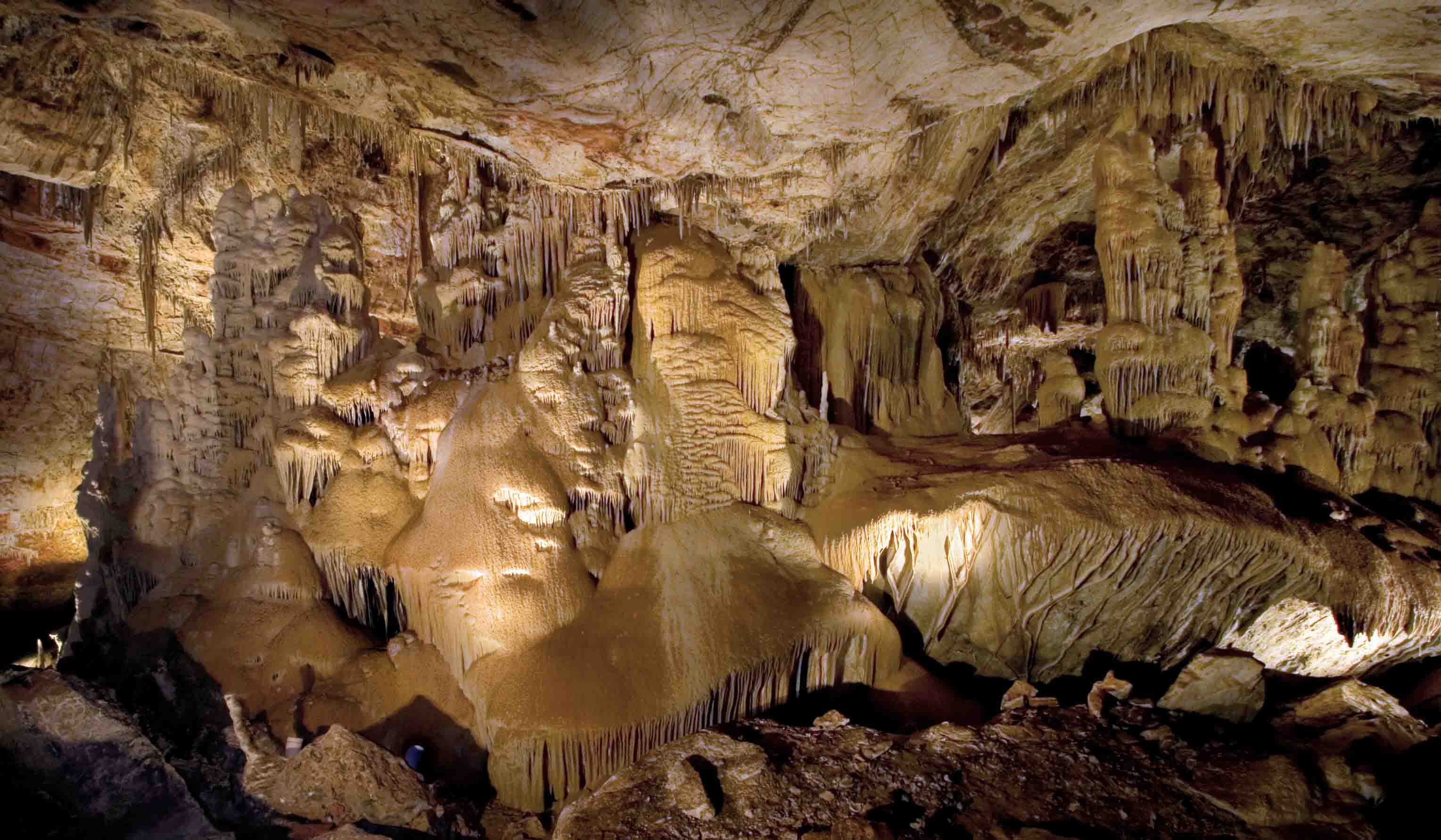
- The Big Room of Kartchner Caverns

- Location within Arizona
- Location: Cochise County, Arizona, United States
- Coordinates: 31°50′08″N 110°20′37″W
- Elevation: 4,700 ft (1,400 m)
- Established: 1988
- Administrator: Arizona State Parks & Trails
- Visitors: 107,509 (in 2024)
- Website: Official website

Kartchner Caverns State Park is a state park of Arizona, United States, featuring a show cave with 2.4 miles (3.9 km) of passages. The park is located 9 miles (14 km) south of the town of Benson and west of the north-flowing San Pedro River. Long hidden from view, the caverns were discovered in 1974 by local cavers, assisted by state biologist Erick Campbell who helped in its preservation.

The park encompasses most of a down-dropped block of Palaeozoic rocks on the east flank of the Whetstone Mountains.

The caverns are carved out of limestone and filled with spectacular speleothems which have been growing for 50,000 years or longer, and are still growing. Careful and technical cave state park development and maintenance, initially established by founder Dr. Bruce Randall "Randy" Tufts, geologist, were designed to protect and preserve the cave system throughout the park's development, and for perpetuity.

== History ==
The caverns were discovered in 1974, when cavers Gary Tenen and Randy Tufts found a narrow crack in the bottom of a sinkhole, and followed the source of warm, moist air toward what ended up being more than 2.5 miles (4.0 km) of pristine cave passages.

Randy Tufts, PhD, who at the time of his death was a geologist and lunar and planetary scientist for NASA, was introduced to caving as a young boy by his maternal uncle, who was also a geologist. His uncle showed Randy caves in Arizona that had been vandalized in various ways including graffiti, litter, and the theft of stalactites and stalagmites. At the age of 13, Randy read an English children's adventure book entitled "Five Boys in a Cave." This book inspired him. At the time he decided to find a cave that had not ever been vandalized and protect it. For years, Randy would take his college peers out to the Whetstone limestone mountain range looking for caves, walking a grid, with no success until they asked a local miner if he had ever heard of a local cave. The miner pointed to the foothills below them. There they found – and nearly fell into – a deep sink hole filled with rattlesnakes.

At the time, although they had found a sink hole and a small cave chamber, they did not think that the cave went anywhere.

It was years later when Randy was on a picnic luncheon date, that he found another sink hole. He went home to gather his caving gear and asked Gary Tenen to join him to explore the new sink hole. That new sink hole was also disappointing, but Randy and Gary decided upon a whim to return to the prior sink hole. This time they could smell bat guano, a hint that the cave might be much larger than they had originally thought. It was after crawling the length of a football field, sometimes on their bellies, with only carbide lamps for light, that they came to a very small bat hole. After chipping away at the hole for hours they entered the "Big Room". While there, they realized that this discovery could place the caverns at risk.

Hoping to protect the cave from vandalism, they kept the location a secret for 14 years. After years of thought, they decided that the best way to preserve the cavern – which was near a freeway – was to develop it as a tour cave. After gaining the cooperation of the Kartchner family and working with them for ten years, together they approached the Arizona State Parks Board. Ken Travous, the Director of the AZ state parks was instrumental in establishing the funding and resources for protecting the caverns. In 1985, The Nature Conservancy acquired an option to purchase the land. The discovery of the cave was finally made public in 1988 when the landowners sold the area to the state for development as a park and show cavern. Prior to its grand opening in 1999, the state spent $28 million on a high-tech system of air-lock doors, misting machines and other equipment designed to preserve the cave.

== Tourism information ==
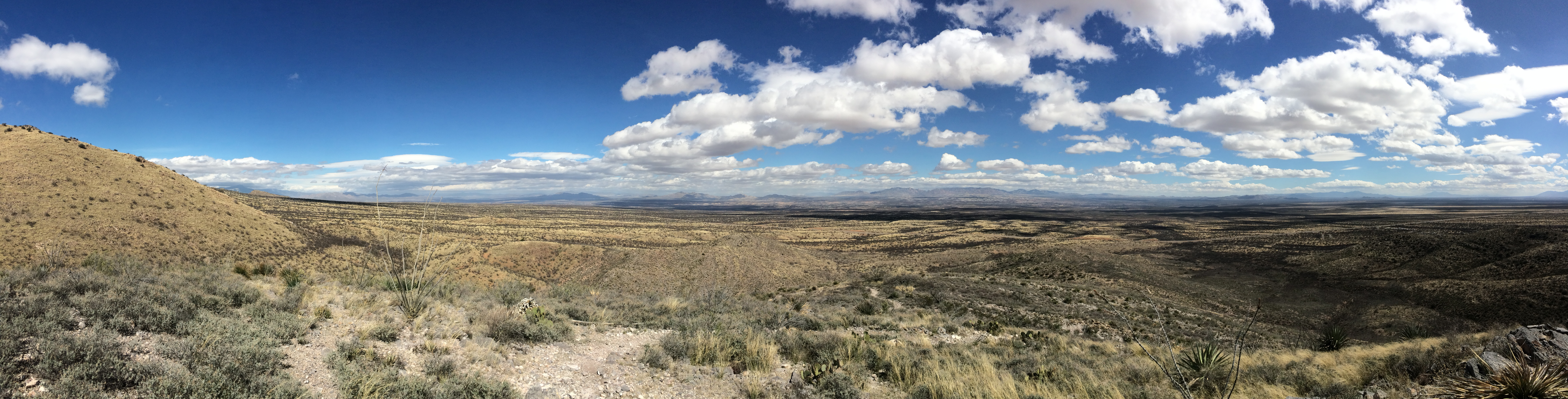
Walking trails on the Whetstone Mountains above Kartchner Caverns State Park

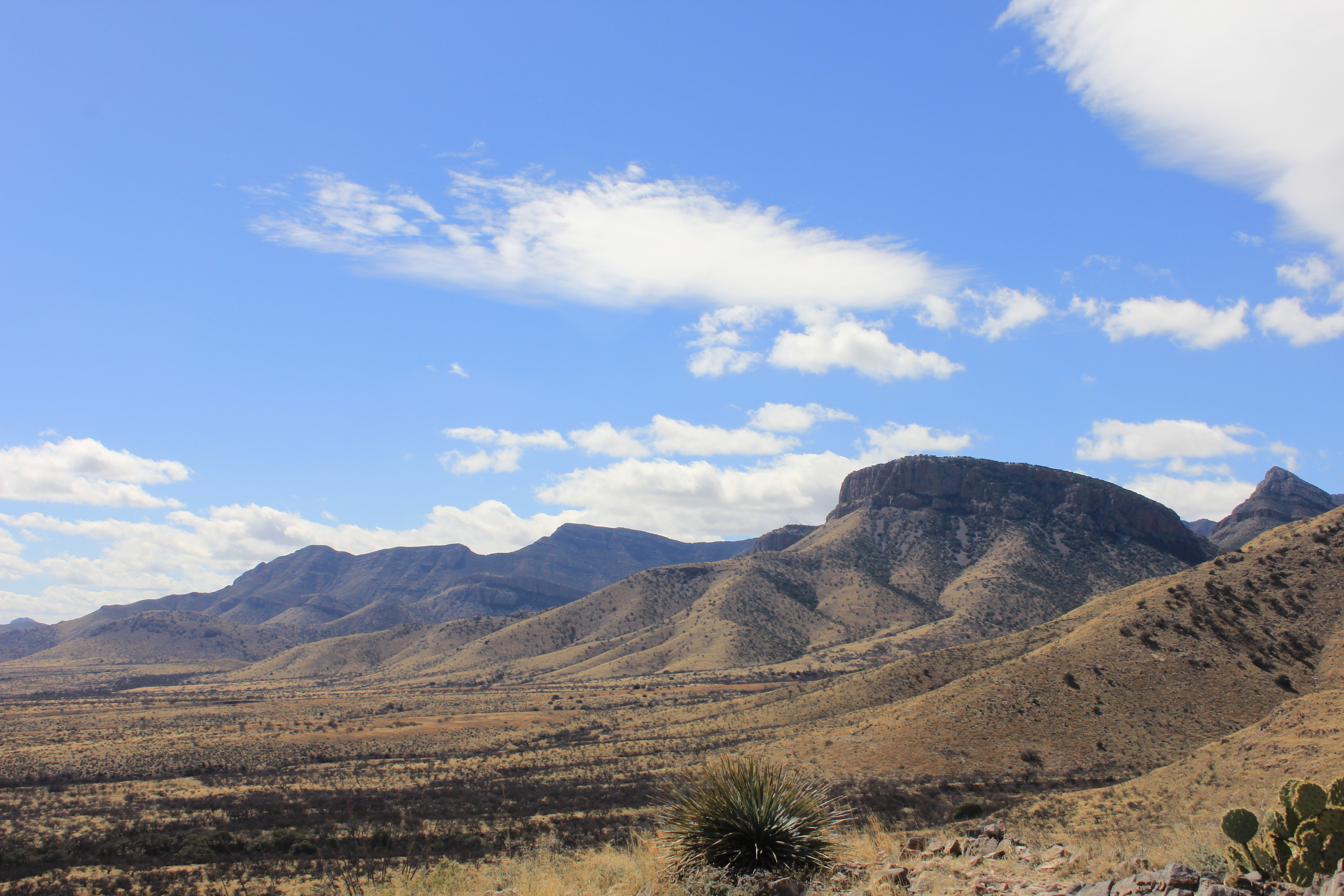
A view from the walking trails above Kartchner Caverns State Park

The two major features of the caverns accessible to the public are the Throne Room and the Big Room. The Throne Room contains one of the world's longest (21 ft 2 in (6.45 m)) soda straw stalactites and a 58-foot (18 m) high column called Kubla Khan, after the poem. The Big Room contains the world's most extensive formation of brushite moonmilk. Big Room cave tours are closed during the summer for several months (April 15 to October 15) each year because it is a nursery roost for cave bats, however the Throne Room tours remain open year-round.

Other features publicly accessible within the caverns include Mud Flats, Rotunda Room, Strawberry Room, and Cul-de-sac Passage. Approximately 60% of the cave system is not open to the public.

The park has hiking trails on the ground above the caverns. The longest trail, the Guindani Trail, is 4.2 miles, while the shorter trail, the Foothills Loop Trail, measures 2.5 miles.

== Animal life ==
Although the cave is largely uninhabited, as many as 2000 Myotis velifer bats nest in the cave during late spring.

== Cave formations and vegetation ==
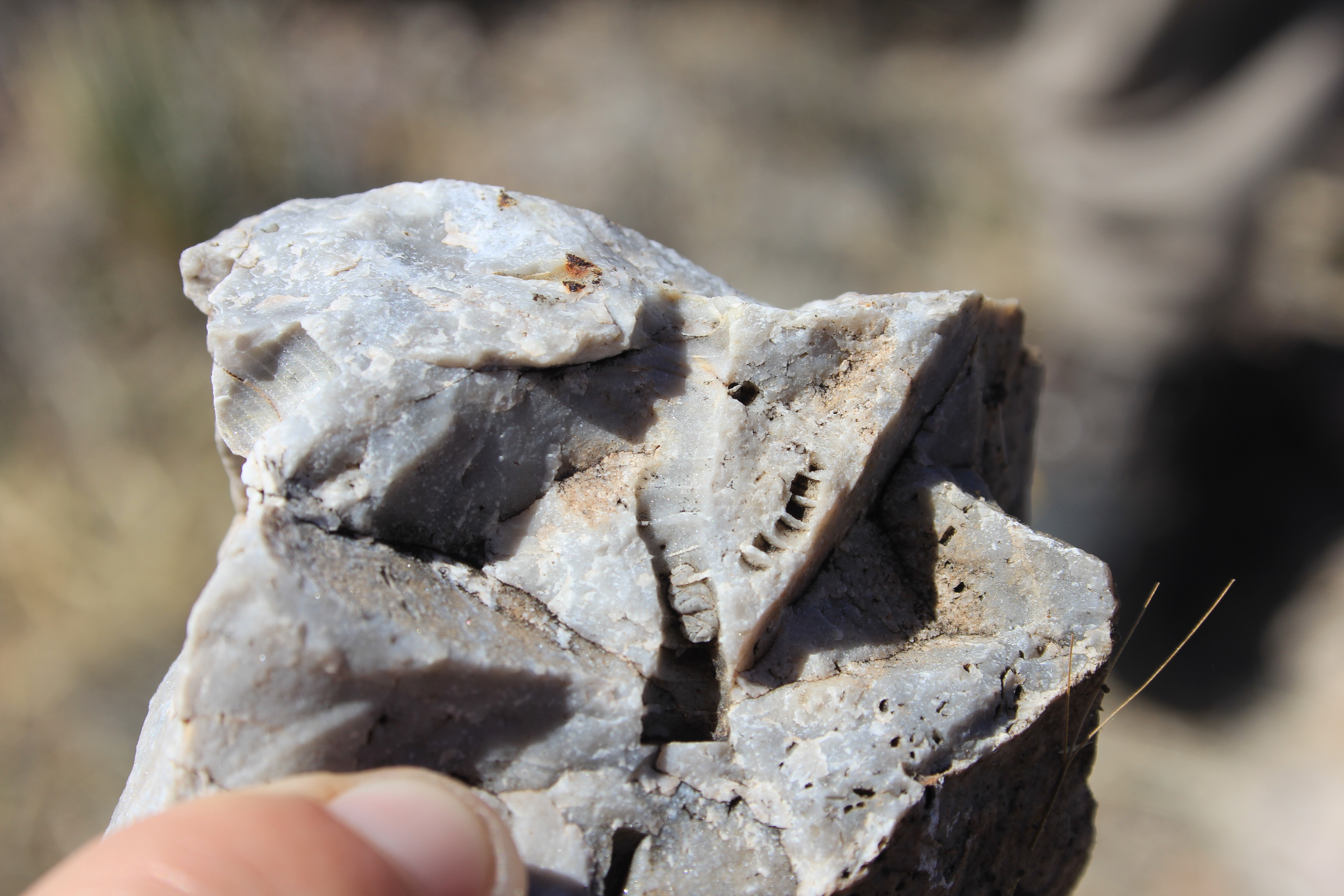
Fossil crinoid casts at Kartchner Caverns State Park

Many different cave formations can be found within the caves and the surrounding park. These include cave bacon, helictites, soda straws, stalactites, stalagmites and others. Cave formations like the stalactites and stalagmites grow approximately a 16th of an inch every 100 years.

Along the Foothills Loop Trail hike, desert plants may be observed: ocotillo, creosote bush, mesquite, desert broom, acacia, wait-a-minute bush, scrub oak, barrel cactus, prickly pear, buckhorn cholla, and hackberry.

== Sister caves ==
- Frasassi Caves (Genga, Italy)
