= Scirca =

- Frazione
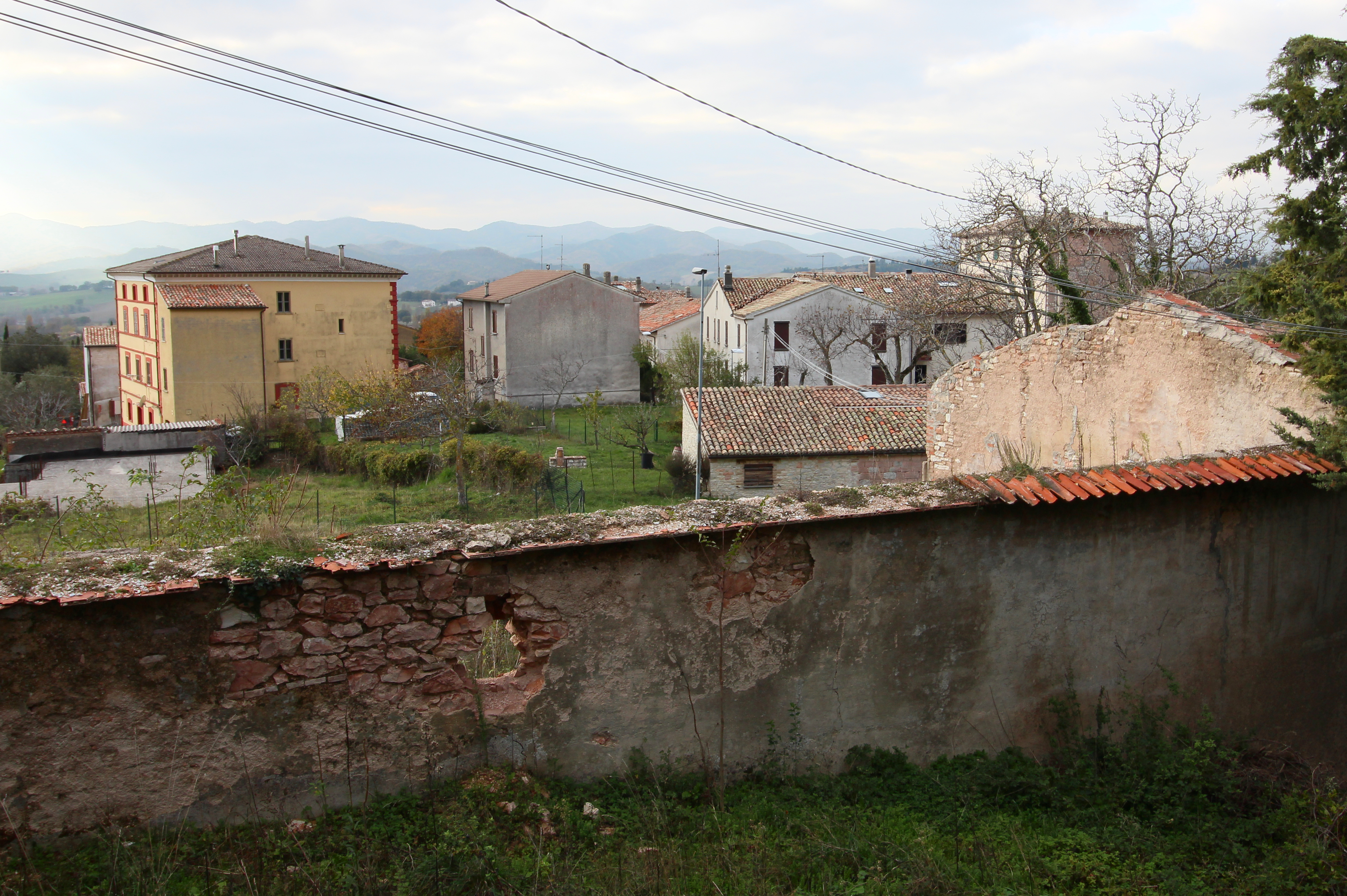

- Location of Scirca in Italy
- Coordinates: 43°21′06″N 12°43′25″E
- Country: Italy
- Region: Umbria
- Province: Perugia
- Comune: Costacciaro
- Elevation: 505 m (1,657 ft)

Population (2001)
  - Total: 15
- Time zone: UTC+1 (CET)
  - Summer (DST): UTC+2 (CEST)
- Dialing code: 075

Scirca is a frazione of the comune of Costacciaro in the Province of Perugia, Umbria, central Italy. It stands at an elevation of 505 metres above sea level. At the time of the Istat census of 2001 it had 15 inhabitants.
