= San Savino =

San Savino may refer to:

- Sabinus of Spoleto (died ca. 300), Italian saint
- Costa San Savino, in the comune of Costacciaro in the Province of Perugia, Umbria (Italy)
- Monte San Savino, a commune in the Province of Arezzo, Tuscany (Italy)
- San Savino, a frazione of Magione, Umbria (Italy)
