= Monte Cucco (Umbria) =

Mountain in Umbria, Italy

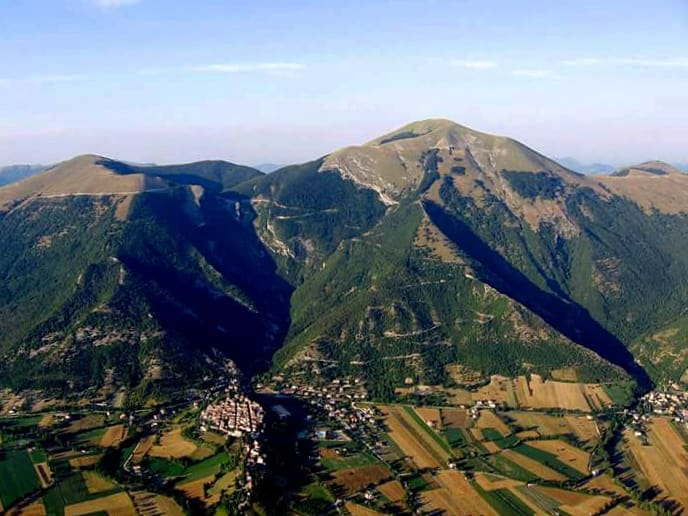
- Umbrian side of the mountain

Highest point
- Elevation: 1,566 m (5,138 ft)
- Prominence: 823 m (2,700 ft)
- Coordinates: 43.3683°N 12.7457°E

Geography
- Location within Italy
- Location: Umbria, Perugia, Italy
- Parent range: Apennine Mountains

Mount Cucco (1,566 m a.s.l.) is a mountain located in Umbria, along the Umbrian-Marche Apennines, in the area of Gubbio, included in the territory of the municipalities of Costacciaro, Scheggia e Pascelupo, Fossato di Vico and Sigillo. Since 1995 it has become a protected area under the name of Monte Cucco Park.

== Description ==
=== Origin of the toponym ===
The place name may derive from "Kukka", an Italic geonym meaning a rounded elevation or crowned mountain used as a place of worship. It is indeed to be included in the vicinity of Mount Cucco the temple of Jupiter Apenninus, as described by Claudius Claudianus.

Obviously, this is not to be taken as the only possible toponymic origin; the name Cucco could also simply indicate the fact that the mountain is hollow inside, because of the large Cave of Mount Cucco, or simply because it is a mountain with a "domed" top.

=== The caves ===
The massif of Monte Cucco, composed almost entirely of massive limestone, was affected in the past by major karst phenomena both by infiltration of surface water and especially by rising sulfurous waters that created hundreds of caves and cavities.

The largest and most famous is the Grotta di Monte Cucco, which at about 35 km in length and -922 meters deep, is one of the largest caves in Italy. The presence of this cave has been known for centuries, as the eastern entrance is clearly visible from the valley below.

=== The caverns ===
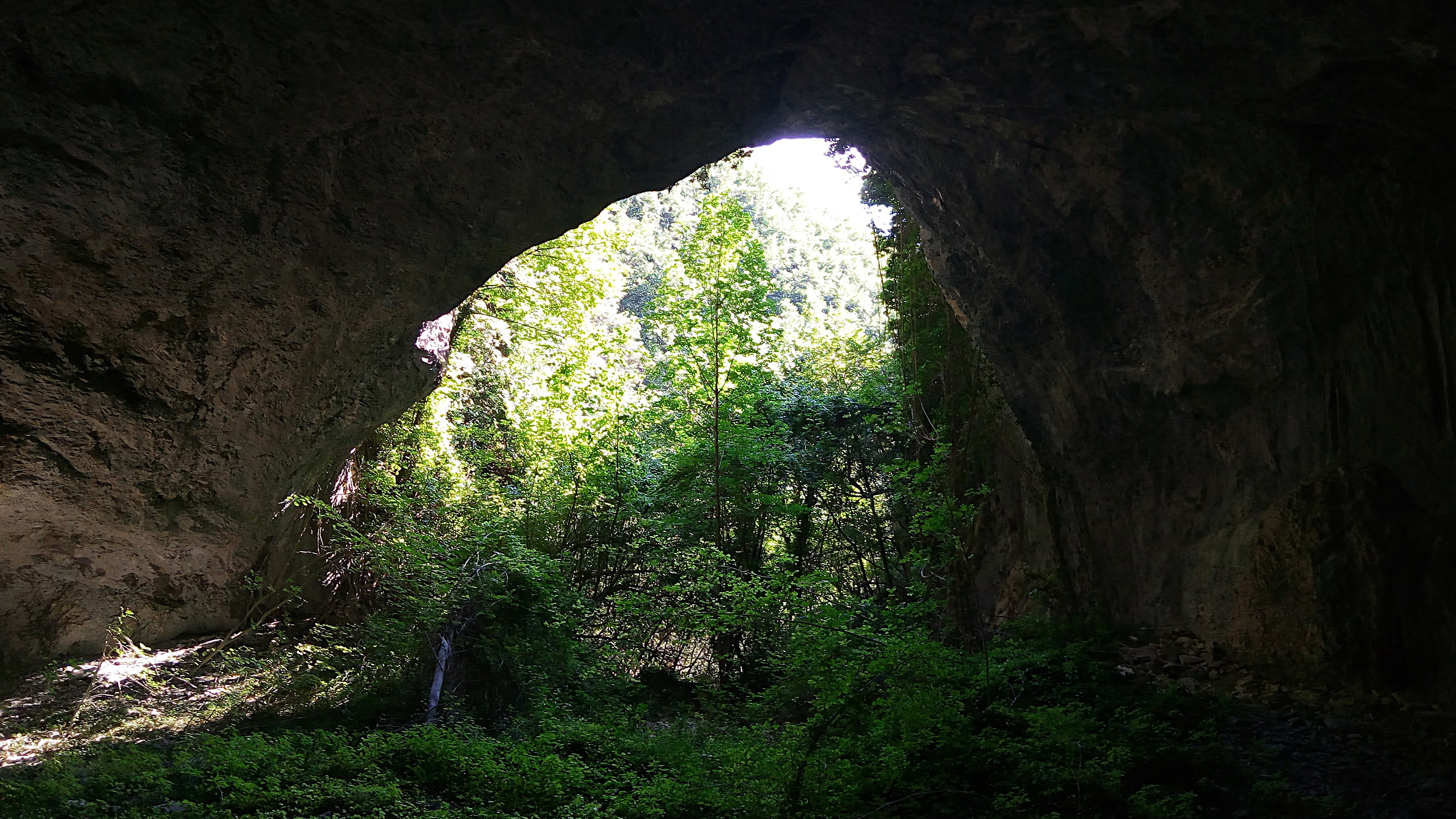
Cave of San Donino

Another peculiarity of Monte Cucco, also due to the phenomenon of karstification, consists in the very numerous presence of caverns, even large ones, among which the best known and most spectacular are Grotta di Santa Agnese, Grotta di San Donino and Grotta Bianca.

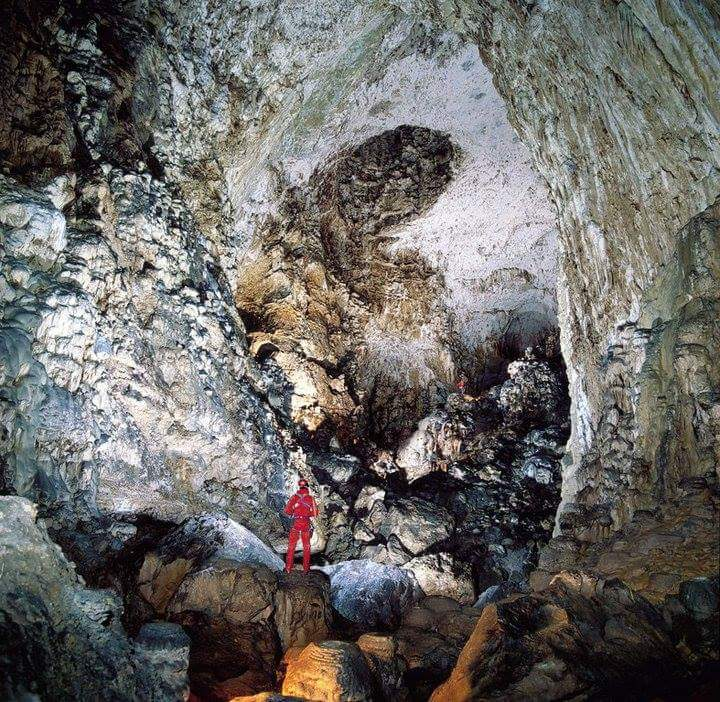
Margherita Hall, Monte Cucco Cave

=== Hermitages and abbeys ===
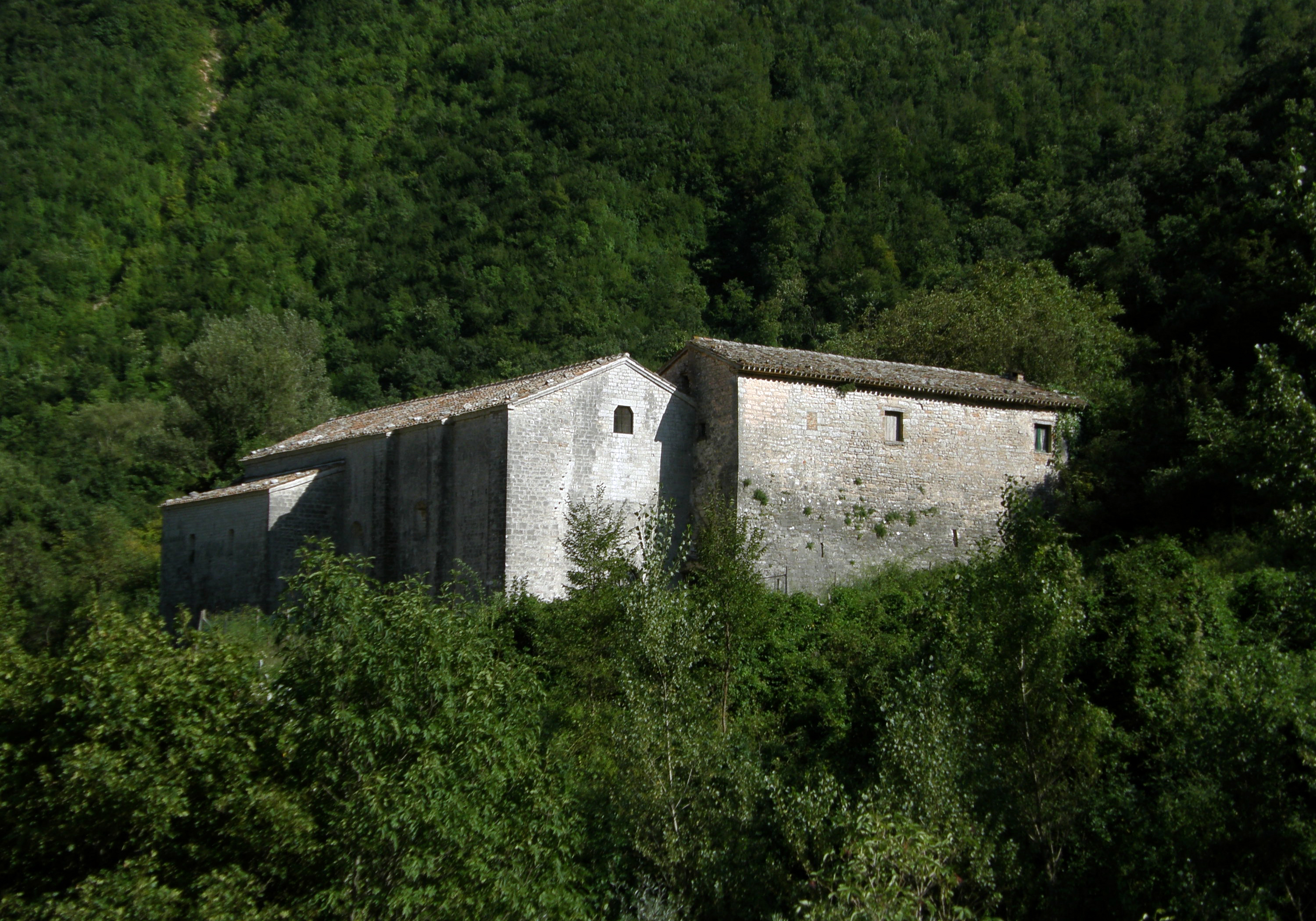
The abbey of St. Mary of Sitria, founded by St. Romuald in 1014 at the foot of Mount Cucco

- Abbey of St. Mary of Sitria, founded by St. Romuald in the 11th century in the Sitria Valley at the foot of Mount Nocria. The abbey is divided into small cells of stone and wood and is built entirely of squared stone in a balanced composition of Romanesque and Gothic motifs, with a single nave and a crypt below the high altar, in pure Romanesque style, supported by a column with a late antique capital.
- Hermitage of San Girolamo (Pascelupo): built around the year 1000 at the base of a rock face more than a hundred meters high.

== Environment ==
=== Flora ===
The very rainy climate of the Umbrian-Marche Apennines, due to the relative proximity of the sea, has fostered a varied flora; in fact, all of Monte Cucco is a protected floristic area.

Being located in a central position in Italy, there are so many varieties of flowers and orchids in Monte Cucco from all over the Apennine belt, including extremely rare ones such as the lady's slipper.

The southwest side of the mountain is dominated by extensive meadows, largely the result of ancient deforestation to create pastures. The Northeast slope, facing the sea, sees the presence of very large forests.

Above 1000m altitude the dominant plant is the beech; beech forests cover most of the Northeast slope in which there is also the largest forest in the entire mountain, called "Mother of Beeches," where specimens are found that exceed 30m in height abundantly.

Below 1000m altitude, the vegetation becomes more intricate and varied, consisting mainly of: hornbeam, ash, maple (in its various types), dogwood, wild cherry, hazel, strawberry tree, butcher's broom, laurel, boxwood, holm oak, downy oak and turkey oak.

The base of the mountain is heavily anthropized, where it is still possible to see cultivated fields bordered by rows of poplars, willows, maples, and oaks, an unmistakable sign of the poor agriculture of the past.

=== Fauna ===
The wildlife that populates the beech forests of Monte Cucco is numerous and diverse.

Mammals include, for example, wolves, foxes, badgers, wild boars, fallow deers, roe deers, wild cats, martens, skunks, weasels, dormouses and Calabrian black squirrels.

Among birds, the eagle owl, the barred owl, the tawny owl, the barn owl, the goshawk, the sparrow hawk, the hoopoe and the black woodpecker stand out in particular.

Among amphibians, the spectacled salamander, the European cave salamander and the fire salamander stand out.

Finally, the entomological fauna is rich, especially that relating to beetles, which are present also with species rare or exclusive to the area, such as Pterostichus battonii and Lathrobium montiscuccoi, which borrows its specific name precisely from that of Monte Cucco. Ascertained and documented in the summer of 2013, in the locality "Balze de La Pìgnola," the significant presence of two specimens of the very rare beetle Rosalia alpina, which lives at the expense of the wood of centuries-old, mature and rotting beech trees.

== Geology ==
Mount Cucco, like much of the Apennines is composed of sedimentary rocks of marine origin dating back to the Jurassic.

The main mountain is composed of limestone rock called "Monte Cucco Massive Limestone," which began to form about 210 million years ago in a shallow, life-rich sea, the Tethys Sea. Over the next few million years, the accumulation of sediments (most of which consisted of the remains of marine organisms) created a conspicuous succession of fossil-rich sedimentary rocks, among them Upper Jurassic ammonites.

The mountain ranges of the Central Apennines were formed starting about 15 million years ago by the collision of two great continental plates: the African and the Eurasian, which caused this huge rock mass to emerge from the sea, creating Monte Cucco, the Apennines and all of central Italy.

Most of the fossils found are preserved and displayed at the Costacciaro Museum.

== University of the Native Men ==
Since 1291, the entire central part of the Monte Cucco massif has constituted a huge collective property, managed by the University of the Native Men of Costacciaro.

This is a communal and indivisible property that has been handed down, for more than seven centuries, to the direct descendants of those families who, beginning in 1291, purchased the mountain from the feudal lords of the area.

This property, which still exists today, has safeguarded a large part of the mountain, especially during the years of cementing and squatting (1950s-60s), preserving the entire mountain, particularly the area of Pian delle Macinare, in an integral way.

== Sports and activities ==
=== Free flight ===
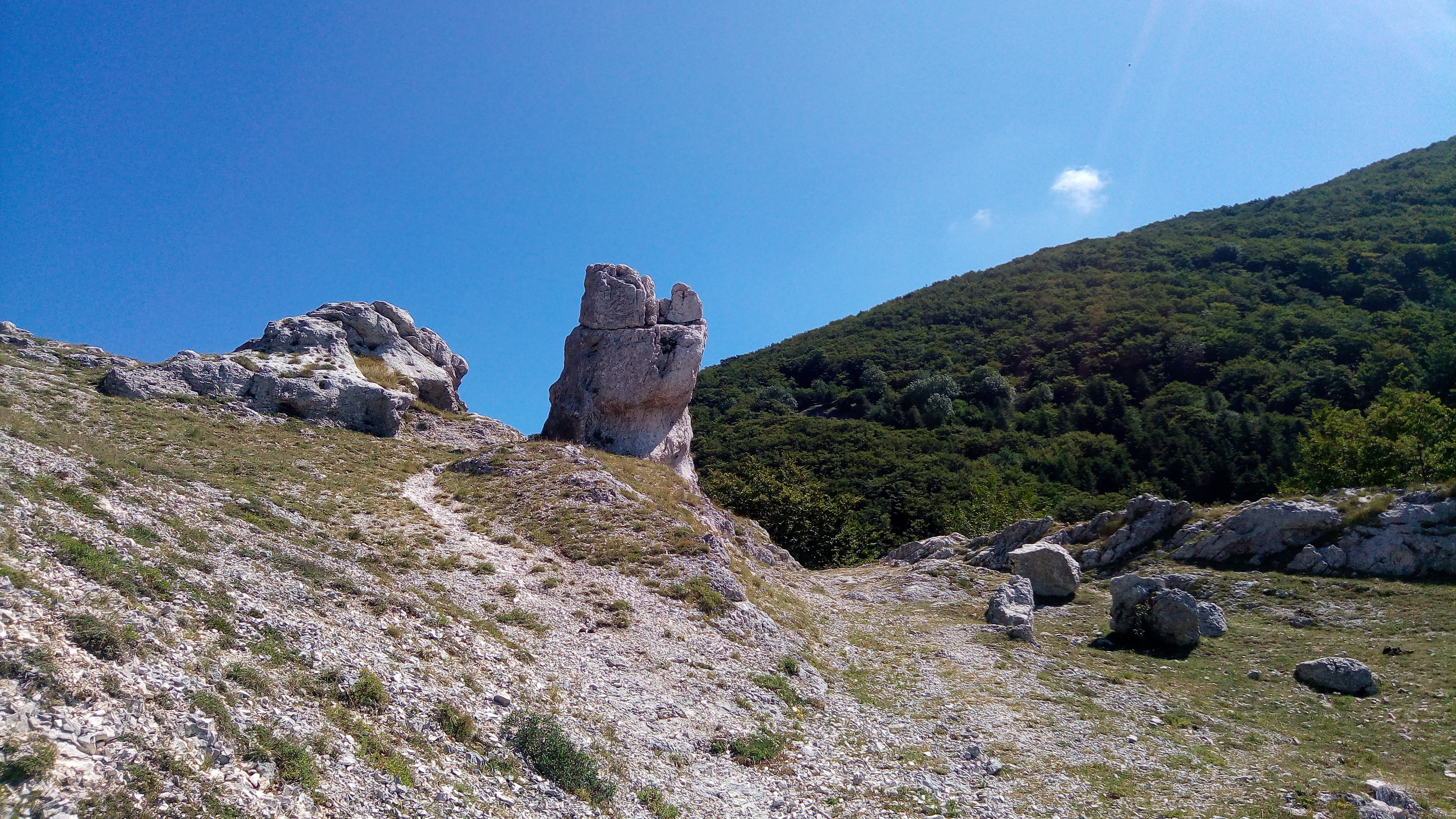
Sasso di Monte Cucco (Monte Cucco Rock)

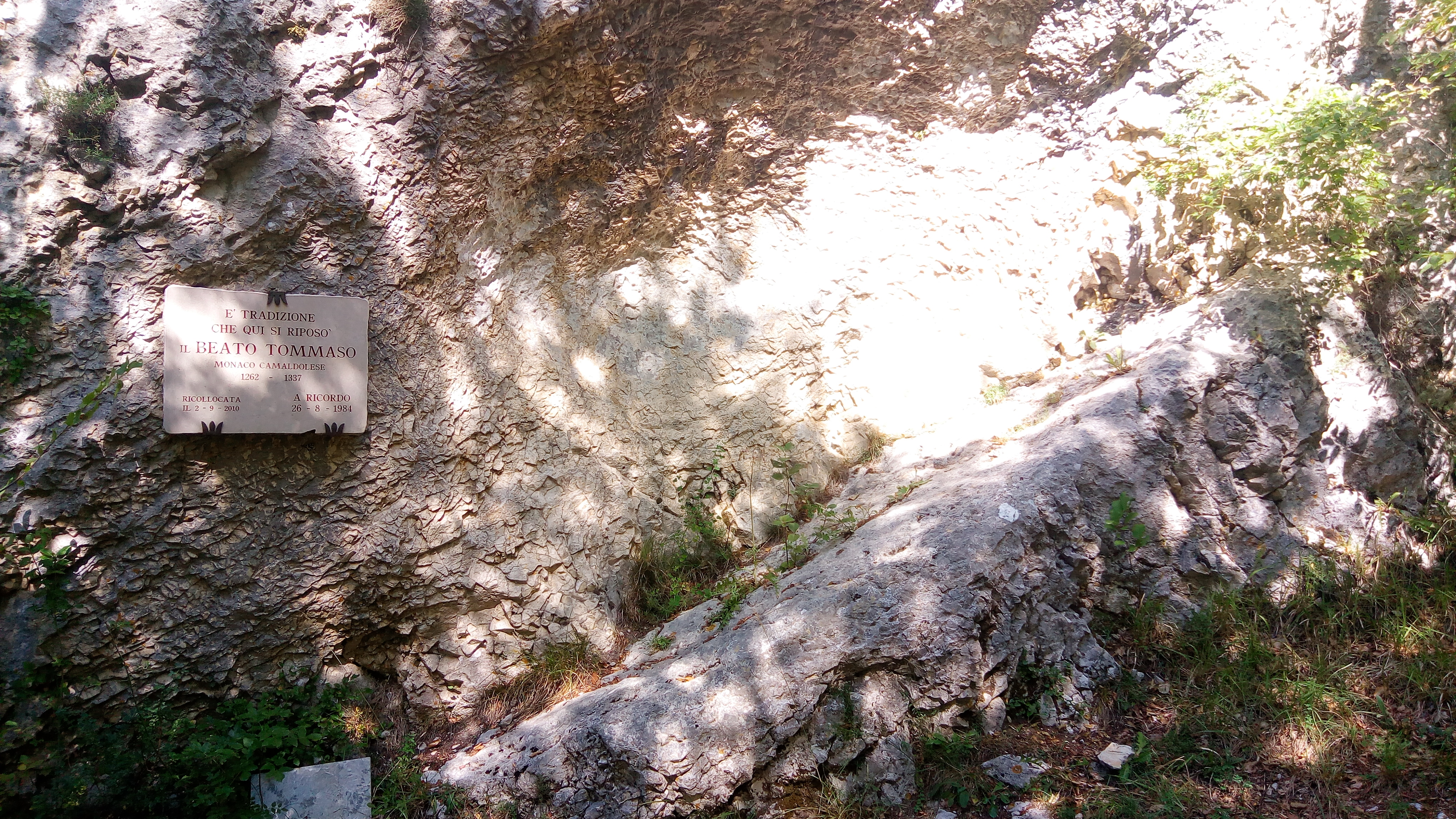
The bed of Blessed Thomas of Costacciaro

Because of its location and morphology, Monte Cucco is considered one of the most important Italian hang gliding and paragliding destinations. National and international hang gliding championships are held there, and a number of records have been broken due to the weather conditions.

=== Caving ===
The Monte Cucco Cave, with its extension of about 35 km and almost 1 km depth, is one of the largest caves in Italy. The cave is continuously frequented by cavers who go exploring in the deep parts, or who conduct specific courses inside it. Part of the cave has recently been made tourist-friendly and is accessible when accompanied by licensed guides.

== See also ==
- Costacciaro
- Sigillo
- Scheggia e Pascelupo
- List of regional parks of Italy
