= Villa Col dei Canali =

- Frazione
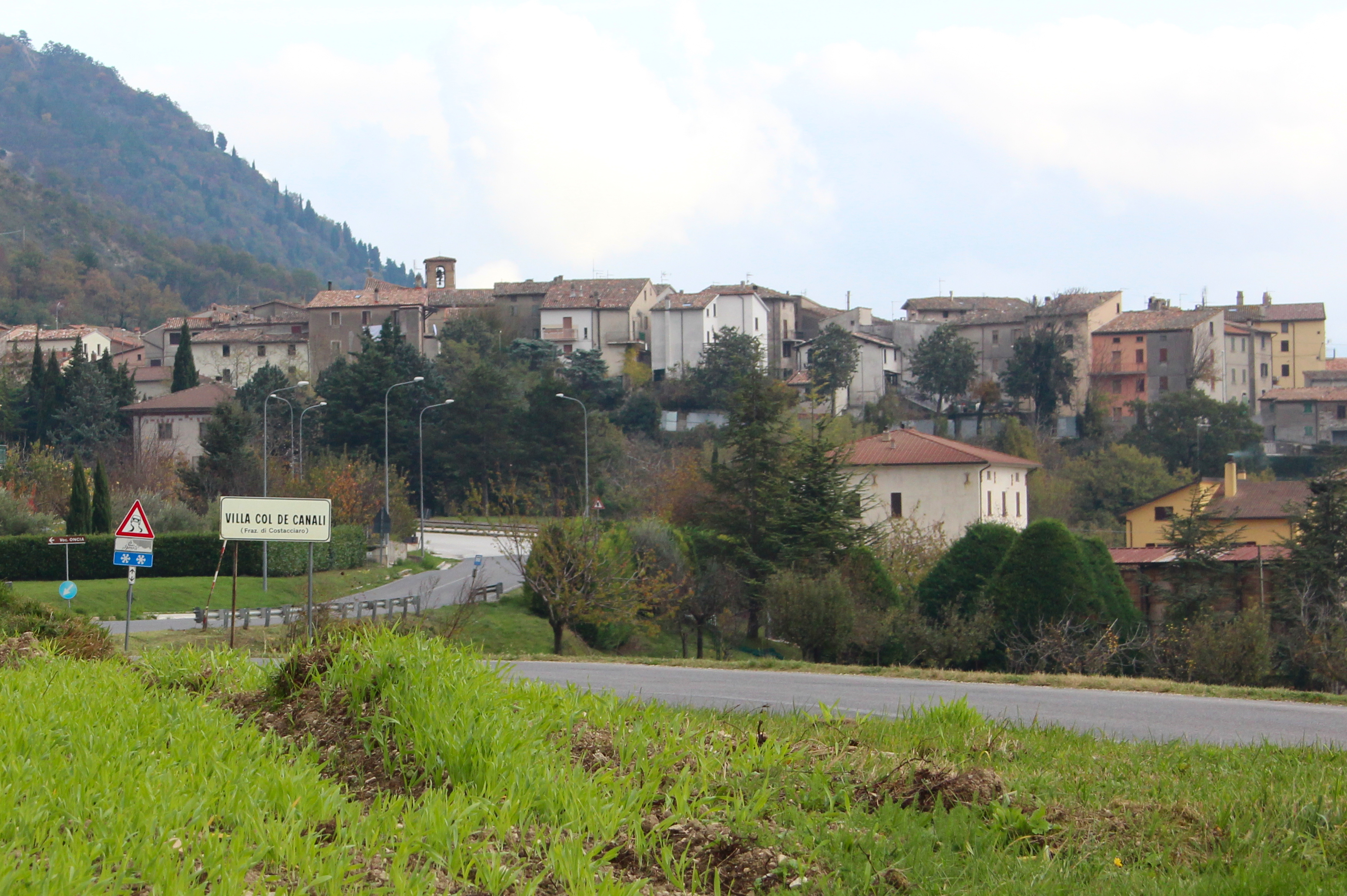

- Location of Villa Col dei Canali in Italy
- Coordinates: 43°22′37″N 12°41′34″E
- Country: Italy
- Region: Umbria
- Province: Perugia
- Comune: Costacciaro
- Elevation: 559 m (1,834 ft)

Population (2001)
  - Total: 253
- Time zone: UTC+1 (CET)
  - Summer (DST): UTC+2 (CEST)
- Dialing code: 075

Villa Col dei Canali (also Col de’ Canali) is a frazione of the comune of Costacciaro in the Province of Perugia, Umbria, central Italy. It stands at an elevation of 559 metres above sea level. At the time of the Istat census of 2001 it had 253 inhabitants.

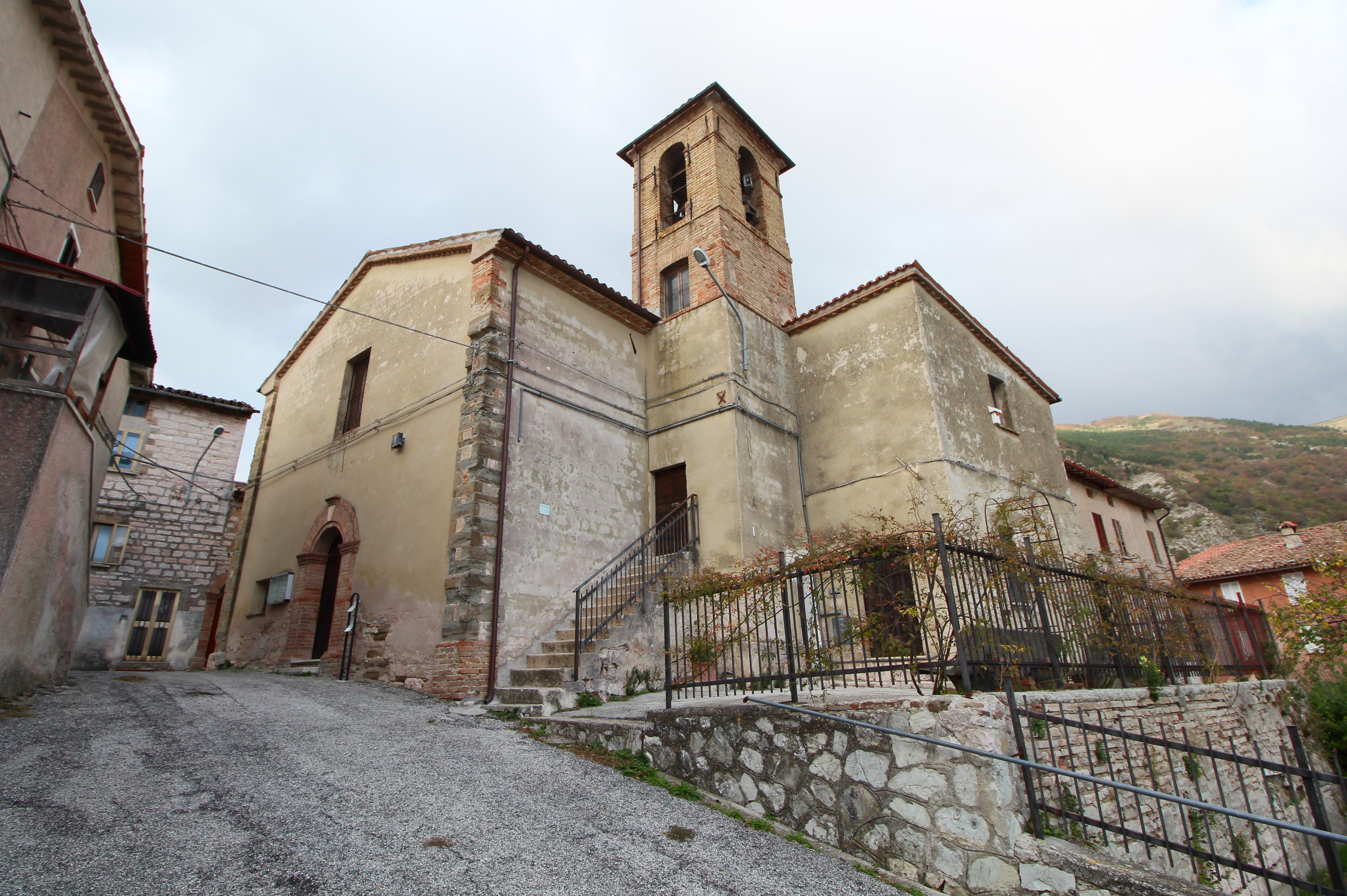
The church of Sant'Apollinare
