= Vinci Grossi =

Italian politician (1924–2000)

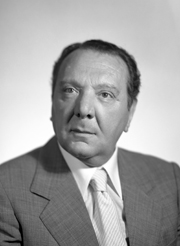

Member of the Senate of the Republic
- In office 20 June 1979 – 1 July 1987
- Constituency: Umbria

President of the Province of Perugia
- In office 15 June 1975 – 4 June 1979
- Preceded by: Alfredo Ciarabelli
- Succeeded by: Umberto Pagliacci

Member of the Legislative Assembly of Umbria
- In office 1970–1975

Personal details
- Born: 7 April 1924 Perugia, Kingdom of Italy
- Died: 20 April 2000 (aged 76) Perugia, Umbria, Italy
- Party: Italian Communist Party
- Profession: Radiologist

Vinci Grossi (7 April 1924 – 20 April 2000) was an Italian politician who served as president of the Province of Perugia from 1975 to 1979 and as a senator from 1979 to 1987.

He participated in the Italian Resistance after the liberation of Perugia in 1944 and served with the "Cremona" Combat Group. After the war, he became a leading figure of the Italian Communist Party (PCI) in Umbria. In 1970, he was elected to the newly established Legislative Assembly of Umbria, where he served as parliamentary group leader for the PCI until 1975.
