= Costacciaro =

- Comune
- Comune di Costacciaro
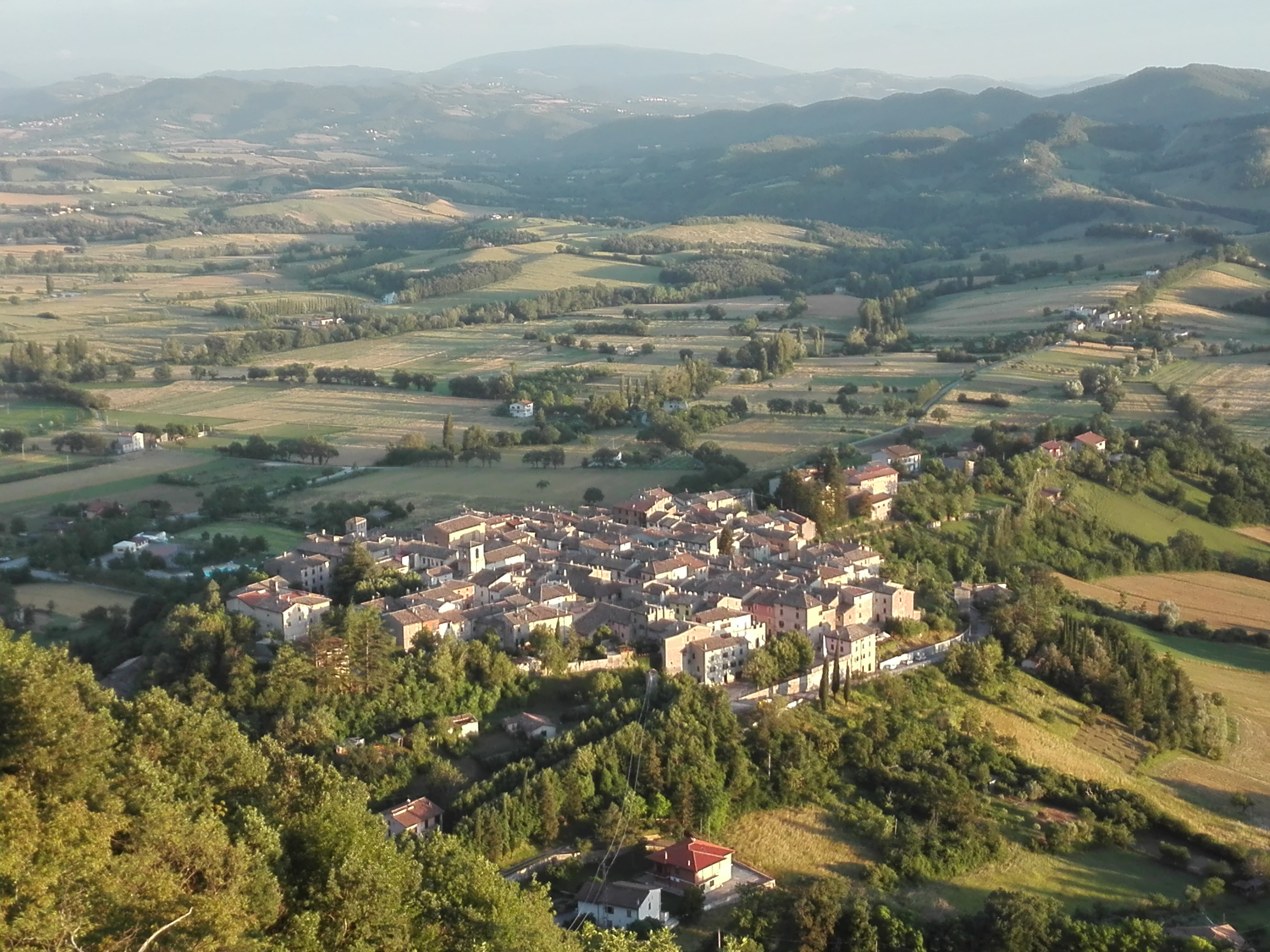
- View of Costacciaro

- Coat of arms

- Location within Italy Location within Umbria
- Coordinates: 43.358956°N 12.71194°E
- Country: Italy
- Region: Umbria
- Province: Perugia (PG)

Government
  - Mayor: Andrea Capponi

Area
  - Total: 41.06 km^{2} (15.85 sq mi)
- Elevation: 567 m (1,860 ft)

Population (1 January 2025)
  - Total: 1,031
  - Density: 25.11/km^{2} (65.03/sq mi)
- Demonym: Costacciaroli
- Time zone: UTC+1 (CET)
  - Summer (DST): UTC+2 (CEST)
- Postal code: 06021
- Dialing code: 075
- Patron saint: Bl. Thomas of Costacciaro
- Saint day: First Sunday in September
- Website: Official website

Costacciaro is a comune (municipality) in the Province of Perugia in the Italian region Umbria, located about 40 km northeast of Perugia. It is a medieval town that was first under the rule of Perugia and Gubbio before becoming part of the Papal States in the 15th century.

== History ==
Costacciaro is considered a settlement of ancient origin, contrary to earlier historians who dated its foundation to the 13th century. Local archival evidence suggests a more remote origin.

Around 1250 the castle of Costacciaro was built or enlarged and fortified by the commune of Gubbio as part of its territorial defense system. During the medieval period a captain and a notary were appointed by Gubbio, while a local mayor was elected within the community.

In 1379 the inhabitants rebelled against the bishop of Gubbio, and the castle became a center for exiles. Peace was concluded in 1383, when the bishop guaranteed protection to the settlement. The following year, in 1384, the community submitted to Antonio II da Montefeltro.

Throughout the medieval and early modern periods the site played a strategic military role as a transit center along the Via Flaminia, benefiting from its position on this important communication route. In the 15th century its territory was organized into administrative subdivisions known as ville and vocaboli.

On 5 January 1798 the community swore an oath of loyalty to the Cisalpine Government during the Napoleonic era. In the same year an irredentist revolt led by members of the Bernabei family broke out but was suppressed.

In the 1850s, Costaccaro had a population of 1,636 inhabitants. In 1860 the settlement was annexed to the Kingdom of Italy. On 23 December of that year it was transferred from the Province of Urbino to the Province of Umbria.

== Geography ==
The town is situated on a hill at the foot of Mount Cucco, at an elevation of about 500 metres above sea level. It lies approximately 12 kilometres (7.5 mi) east of Gubbio and 18 kilometres (11 mi) west of Fabriano.

Mount Cucco rises above the town to a height of about 1,500 metres. Its well-known stalactite caves, long regarded as a natural curiosity, attracted the attention of scholars and visitors in the 19th century. They were described by Counts Girolamo and Forte Gabrielli, members of a prominent local noble family. About 1.5 kilometres (0.93 mi) from the town, in the direction of Sigillo, lie the remains of a bridge over the Scirca stream, traditionally identified as an Etruscan structure later restored under the Roman consul Flaminius.

Costacciaro borders the following municipalities: Fabriano, Gubbio, Sassoferrato, Scheggia e Pascelupo, Sigillo. The town was founded around 1250 by the commune of Gubbio as a stronghold against the nearby fortress of Sigillo, held by the commune of Perugia.

=== Subdivisions ===
The municipality includes the localities of Coldagello, Costa San Savino, Costacciaro, Lanciafame, Località Casenove, Pielarocca, Rancana, Scirca, Villa Col dei Canali.

In 2021, 192 people lived in rural dispersed dwellings not assigned to any named locality. At the time, most of the population lived in Costacciaro proper (483), Villa Col dei Canali (202), and Costa San Savino (125). The following localities had no recorded permanent residents: Località Palazzo Billi.

== Economy ==
In the mid-19th century, the local economy was based primarily on agriculture. Cereals were cultivated, and pastureland was abundant. The wine produced in the area was especially esteemed according to contemporary accounts.

== Religion and culture ==
=== Church of San Francesco ===
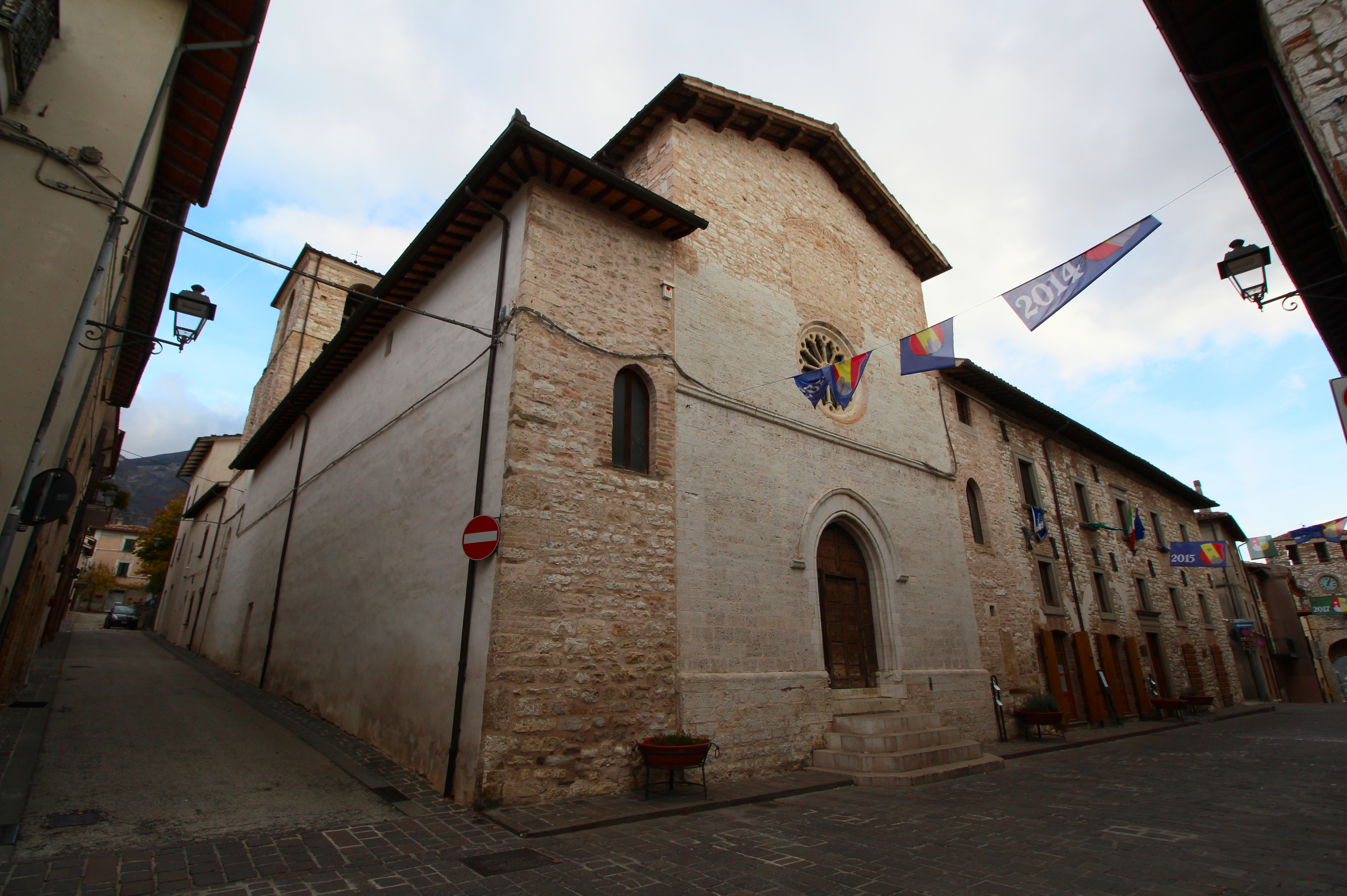
Church of San Francesco

The Church of San Francesco was built around the mid-13th century and enlarged in the early 18th century. Architecturally, it features a Romanesque-Gothic façade constructed in white limestone from Monte Cucco. This façade is the only visible medieval architectural element remaining, following the renovations and extensions carried out during the 17th and 18th centuries.

The façade is distinguished by a portal with a splayed jambs composed of bundled decorated columns. At the base of the jambs are bas-reliefs depicting animal subjects associated with Romanesque figurative culture. Above the portal is a rose window, framed by slender colonnettes adorned with foliage and other ornamental motifs carved in low relief on the capitals.
