= Costa San Savino =

- Frazione
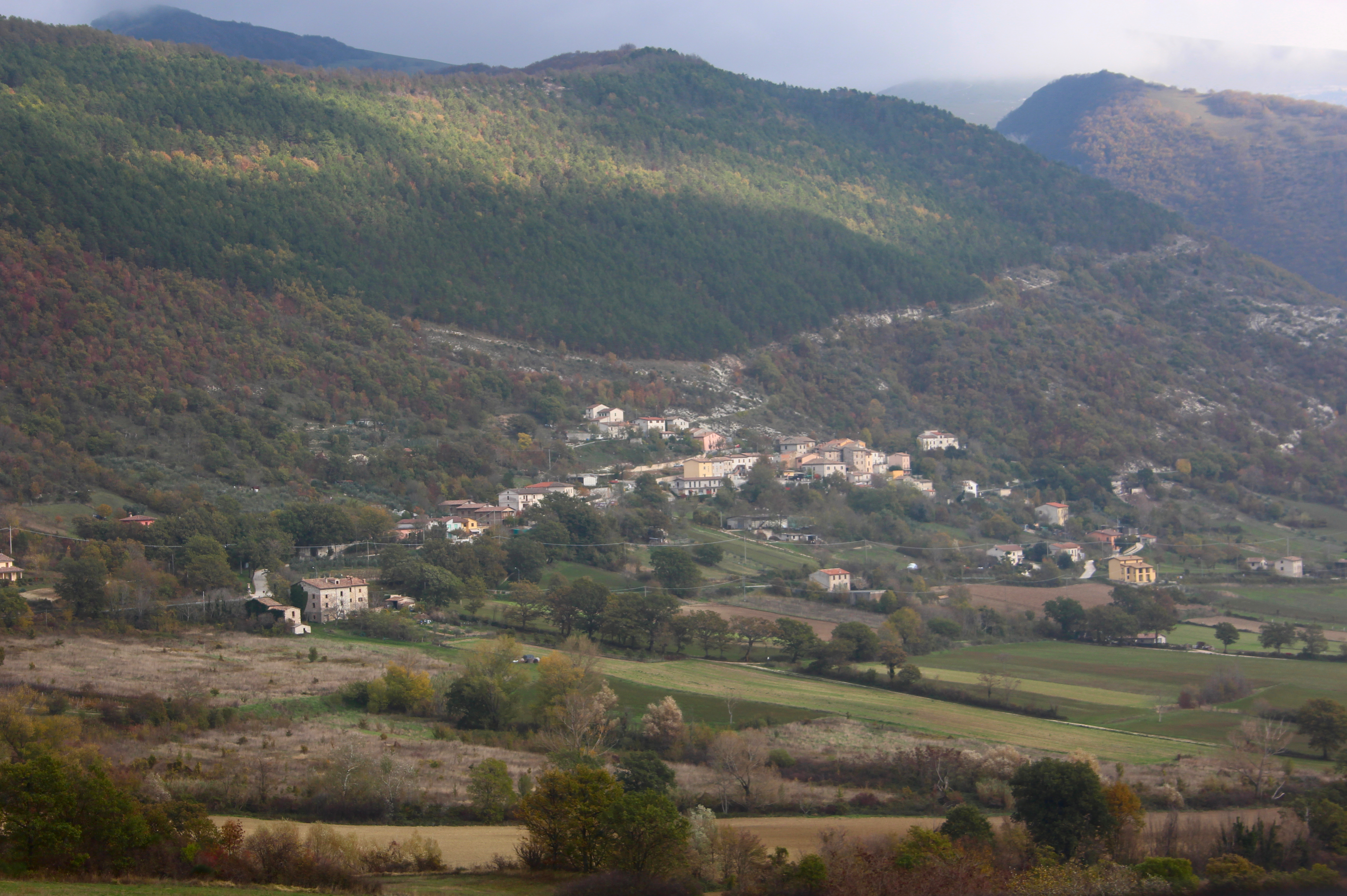

- Location of Costa San Savino in Italy
- Coordinates: 43°23′37″N 12°41′00″E
- Country: Italy
- Region: Umbria
- Province: Perugia
- Comune: Costacciaro
- Elevation: 599 m (1,965 ft)

Population (2001)
  - Total: 139
- Time zone: UTC+1 (CET)
  - Summer (DST): UTC+2 (CEST)
- Dialing code: 075

Costa San Savino is a frazione of the comune of Costacciaro in the Province of Perugia, Umbria, central Italy. It stands at an elevation of 599 metres above sea level. At the time of the Istat census of 2001 it had 139 inhabitants.

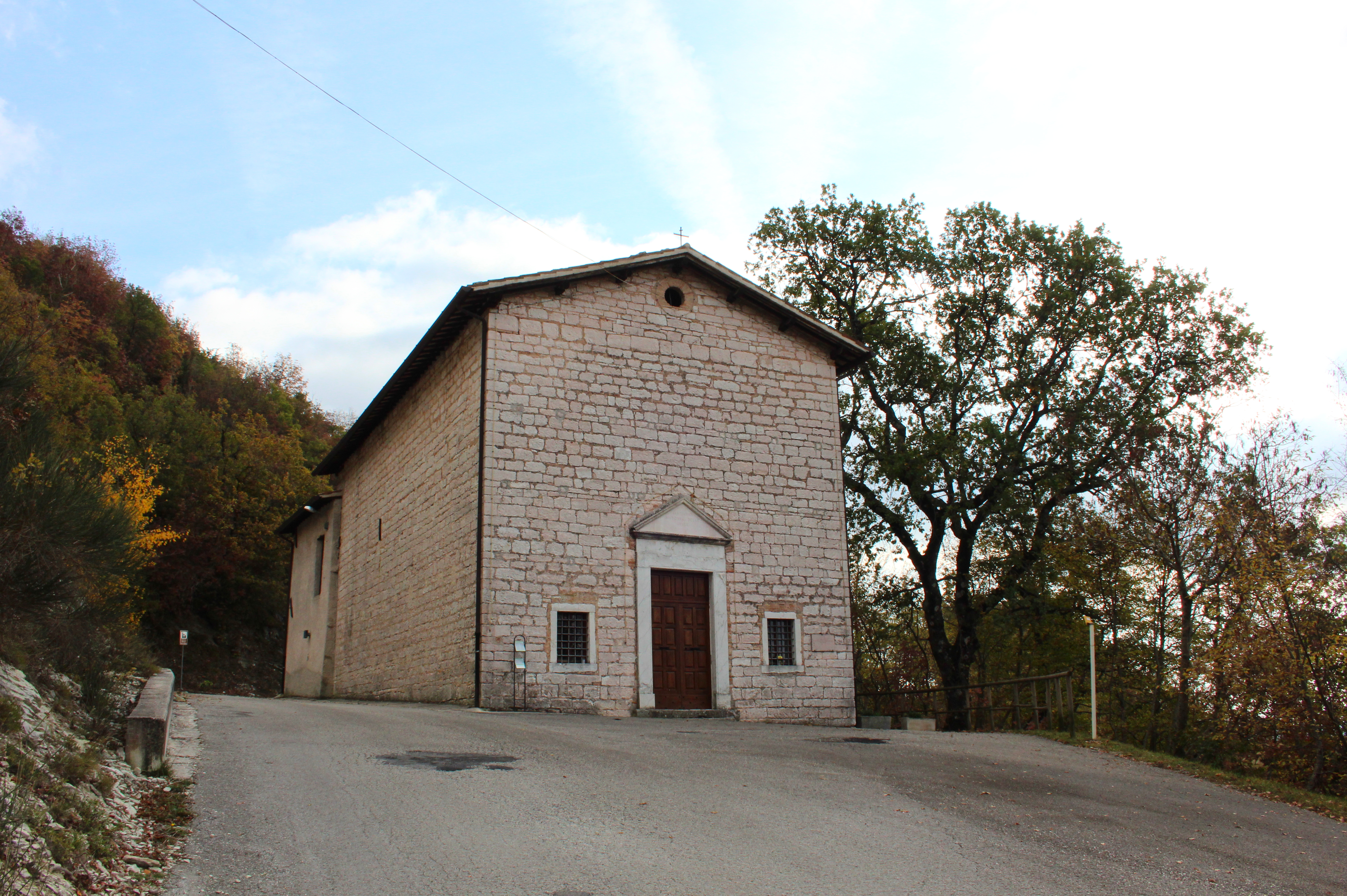
The church Madonna delle Grazie
