= Massimiliano Presciutti =

President of the Province of Perugia
- Incumbent
- Assumed office 31 March 2025
- Preceded by: Stefania Proietti

Mayor of Gualdo Tadino
- Incumbent
- Assumed office 10 June 2014
- Preceded by: Roberto Morroni

Personal details
- Born: 26 August 1971 (age 54) Monthey, Switzerland
- Party: Democratic Party

Massimiliano Presciutti (born 26 August 1971) is an Italian politician serving as president of the Province of Perugia since 2025.

== Life and career ==
Born in Monthey, Switzerland, to parents from Gualdo Tadino, he graduated in political science from the University of Perugia. He later worked in the fields of social cooperation and trade union activities. He has also been involved in regulatory and institutional work within the regional commission on statutes.

He began his political career as a municipal councillor in Gualdo Tadino in 1999 within a centre-left coalition. In 2009, he was elected mayor of Gualdo Tadino, defeating incumbent Roberto Morroni in the second round. He was supported by the Democratic Party and civic lists, including "Gualdo cambia" and "Rinnovamento per Gualdo". He was re-confirmed in 2019 and in 2024.

Presciutti also served as a member of the Provincial Council of Perugia (2017–2019), elected within the "Provincia democratica riformista" list of local administrators aligned with the centre-left. In March 2025, he was elected president of the Province of Perugia gaining 58% of preferences.
