= Sigillo =

- Comune
- Comune di Sigillo
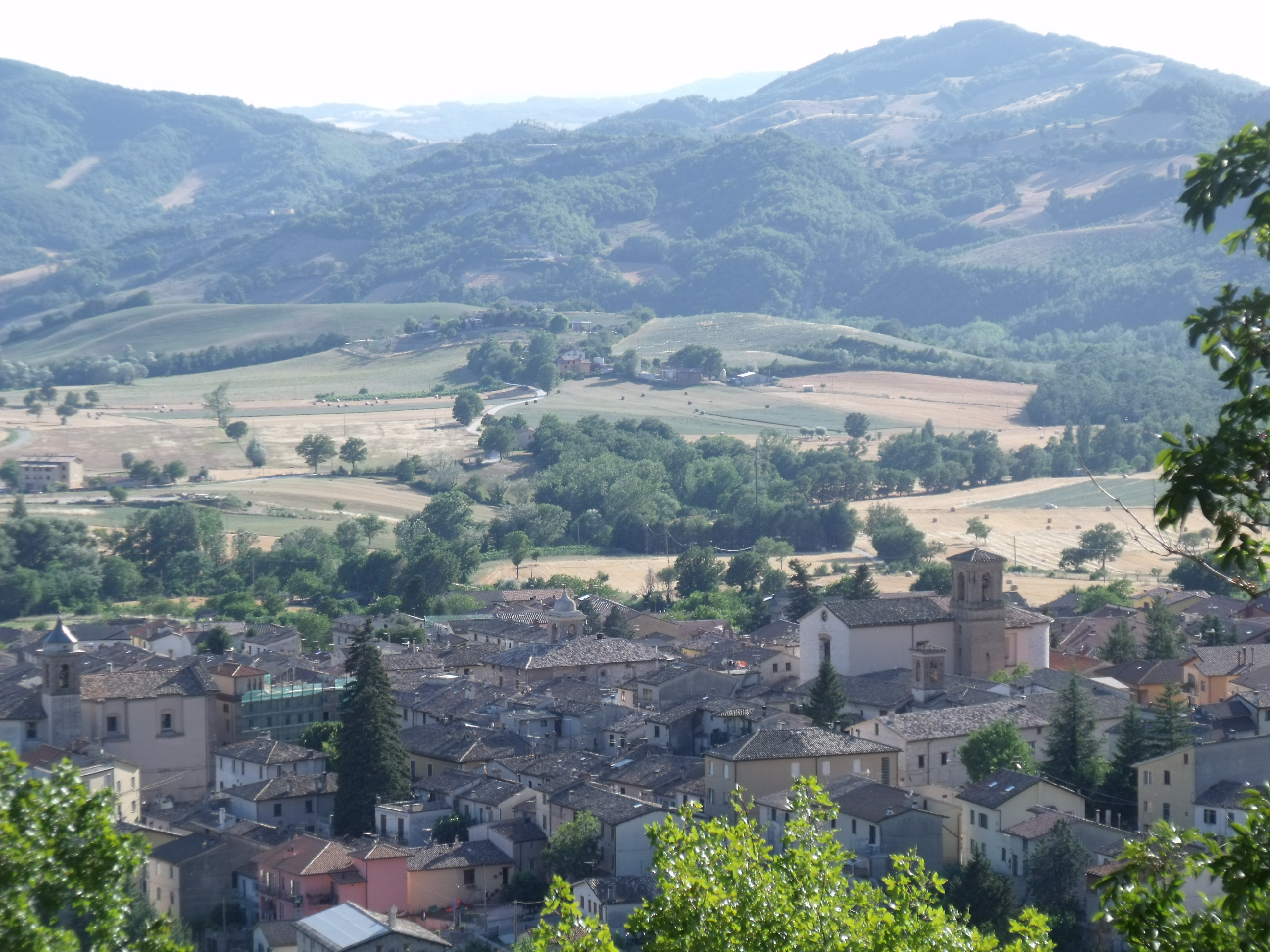
- View of Sigillo

- Coat of arms

- Location within Italy Location within Umbria
- Coordinates: 43.331579°N 12.740931°E
- Country: Italy
- Region: Umbria
- Province: Perugia (PG)

Government
  - Mayor: Giampiero Fugnanesi

Area
  - Total: 26.48 km^{2} (10.22 sq mi)
- Elevation: 490 m (1,610 ft)

Population (1 January 2025)
  - Total: 2,299
  - Density: 86.82/km^{2} (224.9/sq mi)
- Demonym: Sigillani
- Time zone: UTC+1 (CET)
  - Summer (DST): UTC+2 (CEST)
- Postal code: 06028
- Dialing code: 075
- Patron saint: St. Anne
- Saint day: July 26
- Website: Official website

Sigillo is a comune (municipality) in the province of Perugia in the Italian region Umbria, located about 35 km northeast of Perugia.

== History ==
In the Roman period the settlement was known as Suillum, a municipium governed by duumvirs belonging to the Clustumina tribe. It lay along the Via Flaminia and was exposed to repeated barbarian incursions.

Following the Gothic War in the mid-6th century, it became part of the Byzantine-controlled Duchy of Tuscia and served as a frontier stronghold against the Duchy of Spoleto. Control passed in 751 to the Duchy of Spoleto.

In 994 the castle of Sigillo was enlarged by Lupo, son of Monaldo, count of Nocera, who had previously built the fortress of Fossato in 980. In 996 Otto III appointed Vico, count of Fossato, as vicar of Sigillo, a title that remained in use until 1230.

Around the year 1000 it was ruled by Vico, count of Nocera and ally of Otto III; his family maintained control until the early 13th century. The settlement was destroyed in 1230 by Emperor Frederick II on account of its Guelph allegiance.

Jurisdiction passed to Perugia in 1257, which in 1286 ordered a land survey and the definition of its boundaries. In the later Middle Ages it returned to the Duchy of Spoleto. Exiled nobles from Perugia occupied it in 1320, but in the later 14th century it was retaken by Perugia and governed by a podestà and a vicar.

A second fortress was built in 1378, while the walls were repaired in 1432, with further restorations in 1464.

During the 15th century it was contested by several regional lords, including the Baglioni, Boldrino da Panicale, Azzo dei Castelli, Braccio da Montone and the Montefeltro. In 1500 Sigillo was sacked by the troops of Cesare Borgia.

In the mid-16th century, following the Salt War, it was incorporated into the Papal States. Local statutes were adopted in 1616.

During the Napoleonic period it was included in the Department of Musone. On 14 September 1860 it was annexed to the Kingdom of Italy.

In 1859 Sigillo had a population of 1,639 inhabitants, of whom 1,200 lived in the town and 439 in the countryside.

Later developments included the introduction of a potable water supply in 1886 and the arrival of electric power in 1914 from the Isola Fossara plant.

== Geography ==
Sigillo lies partly on plains and partly on hills at the foot of Monte Cucco, one of the highest peaks of the Umbrian Apennines. The town stands at an elevation of 486 metres (1,594 ft) above sea level.

The surrounding territory includes the valley of the Chiascio. Within it are two bridges attributed to the Roman consul Flamininus.

Sigillo is situated about 3 miles (4.8 km) from Fossato di Vico, on flat terrain along the road of the Furlo. The climate is described as cold, with frequent snowfall in winter, and exposed to north and east winds.

Sigillo borders the following municipalities: Costacciaro, Fabriano, Fossato di Vico, Gubbio.

=== Subdivisions ===
The municipality includes the localities of Fontemaggio, Località le Pezze, Scirca, Sigillo, Val di Ranco.

In 2021, 106 people lived in rural dispersed dwellings not assigned to any named locality. At the time, the most populous locality was Sigillo proper (2,057).

== Religion and culture ==
=== Sant'Andrea ===
The church of Sant'Andrea stands near the site of the ancient Rocca and visually merges with it: its unfinished façade and the apse are visible from a distance together with the bell tower rising behind. The building is Neo-Renaissance in style, with a single nave articulated by columns, piers and capitals, and a broad apse. The high altar is placed at the center of the apse, while the two side altars are located within the nave.

Above the entrance is an organ with a decorated gallery dating to the 18th century. The instrument was built in 1793 by Gaetano Callido for the former church of San Francesco in Fabriano and was later transferred to Sigillo in 1869; it is stated to be the first and only surviving example in Umbria by this maker. The walnut choir stalls and lectern are dated 1679, and above the choir is an 18th-century painting of the Martyrdom of Saint Andrew.

=== Sant'Agostino ===
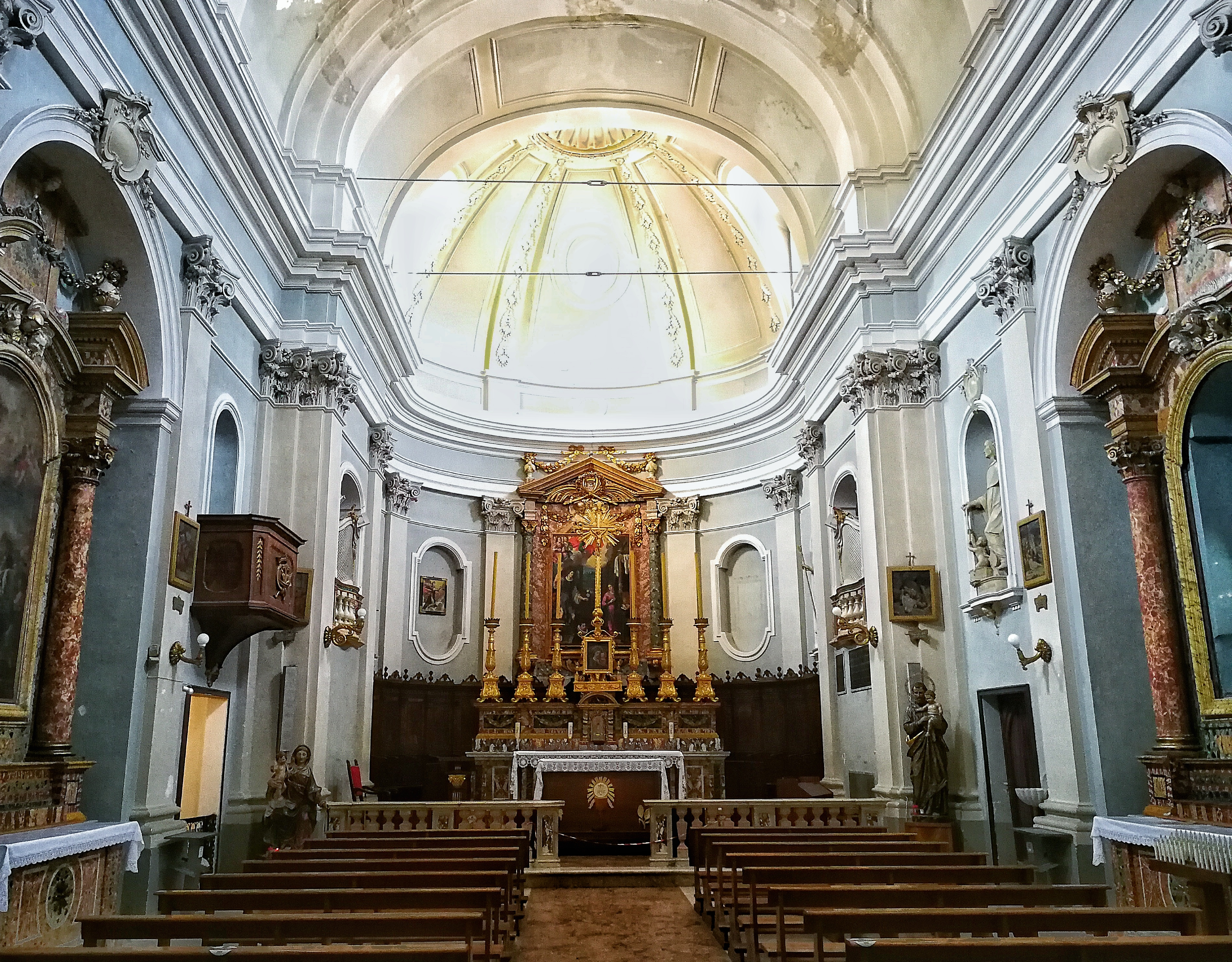
Church of Sant'Agostino

The church of Sant'Agostino was built between 1788 and 1791 by the Swiss architect Giacomo Cantoni on the foundations of the former church of Santa Caterina. From the earlier building there remains a medieval crypt, restored by the municipal administration and used as a cultural center.

The façade is characterized by paired pilasters and a severe portal. Along the interior walls there are two side altars on each side, in the form of recessed aedicules, alternating with niches containing statues. The apse is enriched by a wooden choir and is preceded by a slightly raised presbytery. The high altar was made between 1795 and 1796, using colored marbles including verde antico, giallo di Siena and rosso di Verona.

The Neoclassical interior consists of a single nave covered by a vault, with pilasters and capitals rising to the cornice. Among the furnishings are a large organ and two walnut confessionals. The church contains paintings and wooden sculptures dating from the 16th to the 18th centuries, as well as a gilded copper cross by Enrico di Piamonte dated 1494. The most important work mentioned is a canvas painting, Annunciation and Donor, signed by Ippolito Borghese, located behind the choir.

=== Sant'Anna ===
The church of Sant’Anna was built in the mid-15th century. The church has a single altar. In 1633 a portico was added in front of the church, with three aisles supported by six columns; later the portico was enclosed. The ancient Via Flaminia passed beneath the right-hand nave. The church remains a destination for religious processions held in Sigillo.

The church has a stone façade bearing the date 1507. Its interior walls preserve frescoes of the Umbrian school from the first half of the 16th century.

=== Sanctuary of Santa Maria Assunta ===
Santa Maria Assunta is a 12th-century Romanesque sanctuary, also known as Santa Maria di Scirca or Santa Maria di Montecupo. It has a bell dated to 1250 and underwent restoration in the 1980s. The church contains a fresco by Matteo da Gualdo dated 1484 and possibly another work attributed to his son Girolamo. Other paintings are attributed to Ottaviano Nelli.

=== Roman bridge of Spiano ===
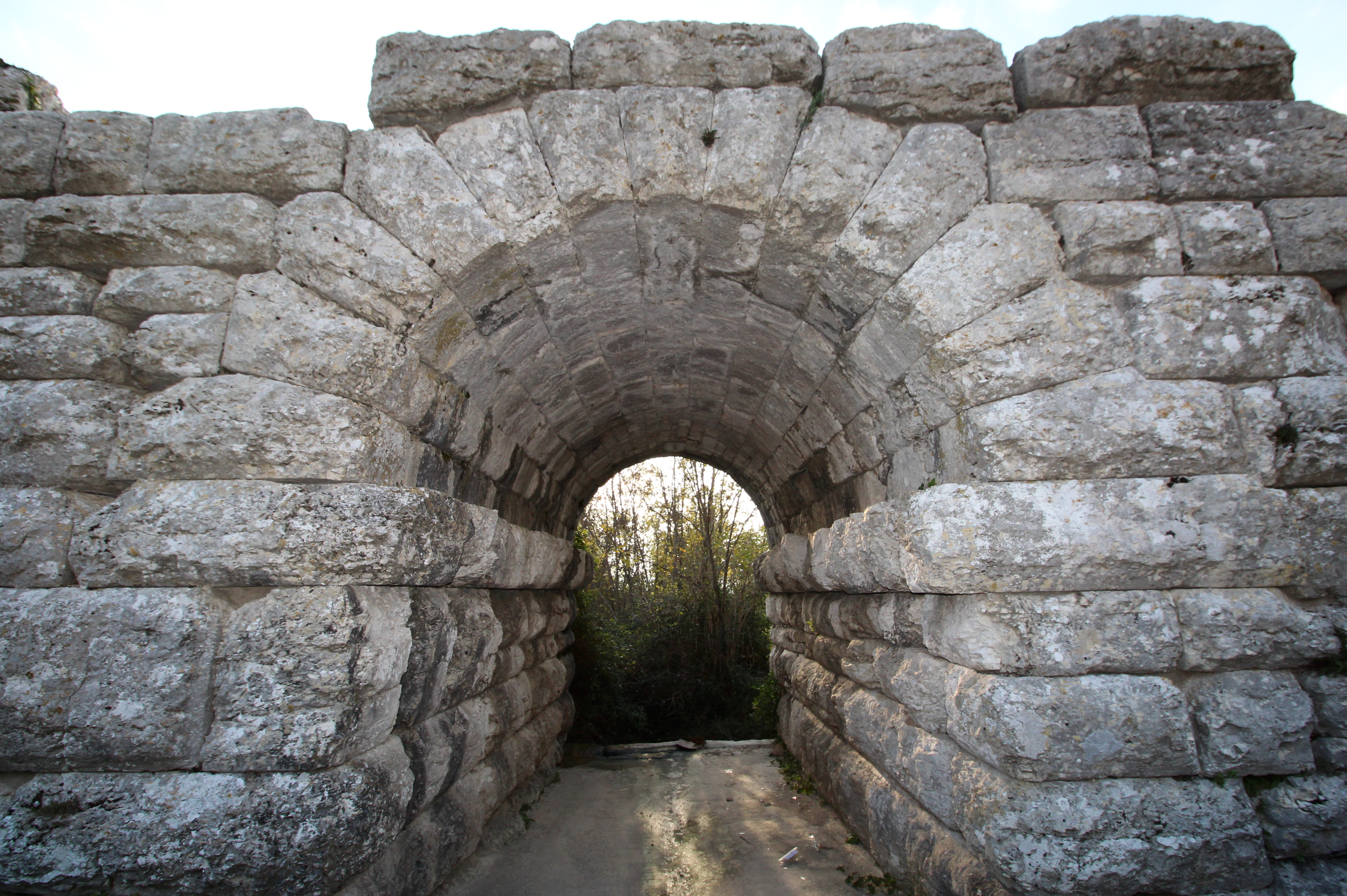
Ponte Spiano

The Roman Bridge of Spiano lies just outside Sigillo. Built from large stone blocks, it enabled the ancient Via Flaminia to cross the Fonturci stream. Some attribute it to the 2nd century BC, others to the Augustan age. Constructed with blocks of corniola, it measures 32 metres (105 ft) in length and 3.25 metres (10.7 ft) in width at the arch.

In the territory of Suillum there was a station on the Via Flaminia known as Helvillum, from which a branch route departed through the mountains towards Ancona; it remained in use for many centuries and into the early 20th century under the name Postiglione.

=== Other cultural heritage ===
In the municipal residence there is a parchment codex written in Latin containing the statutes and ordinances of the community, dated 1561 and decorated with a miniature.

Other sights include the remains of the medieval Rocca ("Castle"), now an Augustinian convent.

=== Landmarks ===
The ascent of Monte Cucco from Sigillo is noted for its extensive views and for the presence of notable caves. These include a system of grottoes with multiple galleries, some extending for about 1 mile (1.6 km), lined with stalactites. Access is gained through a narrow vertical opening.

== Notable families ==
The Gabrielli family is associated with the study and description of the caves of Monte Cucco.

In the 19th century the principal landowner was the Colini family, who established a paper mill in the area.
