= Fossato di Vico =

- Comune
- Comune di Fossato di Vico
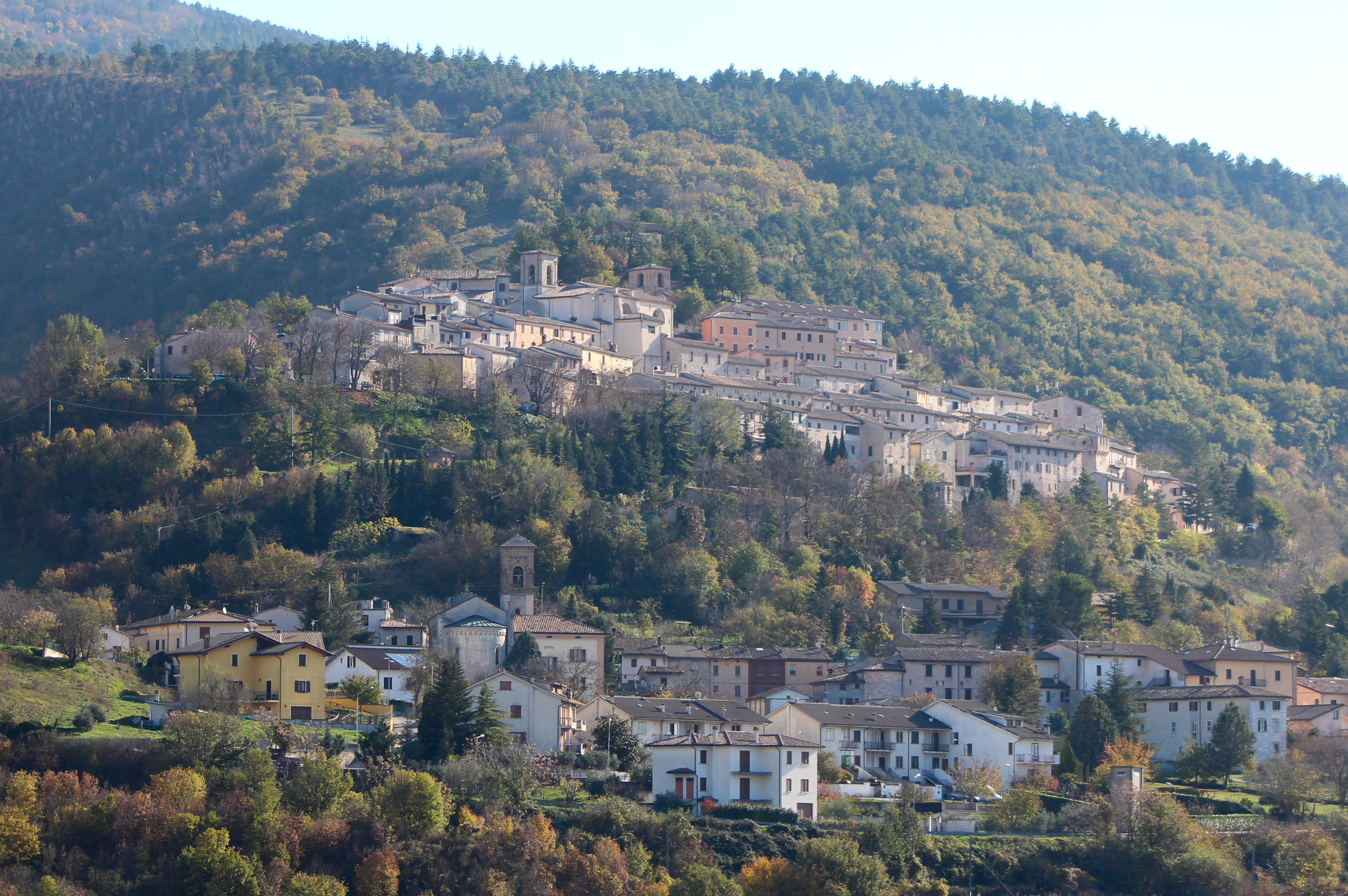
- View of Fossato di Vico

- Location within Italy Location within Umbria
- Coordinates: 43.2947°N 12.761318°E
- Country: Italy
- Region: Umbria
- Province: Perugia (PG)

Government
  - Mayor: Mauro Monacelli

Area
  - Total: 35.30 km^{2} (13.63 sq mi)
- Elevation: 581 m (1,906 ft)

Population (1 January 2025)
  - Total: 2,555
  - Density: 72.38/km^{2} (187.5/sq mi)
- Demonym: Fossatani
- Time zone: UTC+1 (CET)
  - Summer (DST): UTC+2 (CEST)
- Postal code: 06022
- Dialing code: 075
- Patron saint: St. Sebastian
- Saint day: January 20
- Website: Official website

Fossato di Vico is a town and comune of Umbria in the province of Perugia in Italy, at 581 m above sea‑level on the middle slopes of Mount Mutali.

It lies just off the SS 3 highway, between Gualdo Tadino (7 km to the south), Sigillo (6 km north);Fabriano (15 km east) and Gubbio (20 km west).

== History ==
Fossato di Vico is of medieval origin, with its foundation traced to the year 980. It was founded by Lupo, known as Vico, son of Monaldo, count of Nocera. In 996 the emperor Otto III created Vico count of Fossato, and his lineage held control until 1190.

In 1208 the fortress and settlement passed to Perugia through a donation made by Bulgarello Bulgarelli. The people of Gubbio acquired it in 1251, but it returned to Perugia seven years later. In 1378 it became the property of Monsignor Guglielmo Cellole, a Perugian jurist. A monastery inhabited by nuns is recorded from 1309.

In 1386 statutes were granted to the settlement, which was established as a rural community under the municipality of Perugia. It was included in the Porta Sole district and administered through a vicariate office appointed jointly by the authorities of Perugia and local representatives.

In 1442 Fossato was attacked by Francesco Sforza, who was unable to capture it due to the strong resistance of its inhabitants. In 1500 it was sacked by Cesare Borgia while passing through the area during his campaign in Romagna.

During the French rule in the late 18th and early 19th centuries, Fossato di Vico was included in the Department of Musone and Tronto, within the Canton of Fabriano.

In 1815–1816, under Pope Pius VII, Fossato was assigned to the Delegation of Perugia and administered as a dependency of the municipality of Perugia. In 1817 was recognized as an autonomous municipality.

In the mid-19th century Fossato had a population of 1,935 inhabitants, of whom 632 lived in the town and 1,303 in the countryside.

On 12 September 1860, Fossato di Vico was annexed to the Kingdom of Italy.

== Geography ==
The town is situated partly on a hill and partly on level ground, at an elevation of 581 metres (1,906 ft) above sea level and about 8 kilometres (5.0 mi) from Gualdo Tadino. It is described as having solid buildings, a borgo, and being enclosed by walls.

Fossato is situated on the slopes of the Apennines, not far from the Furlo Pass connecting Nocera and Cagli, and along the road leading to Fabriano, from which it lies about 10 miles (16 km) to the southwest. It stands approximately 5 miles (8.0 km) from Gualdo Tadino, 12 miles (19 km) from Nocera, and 26 miles (42 km) from Perugia. The climate is noted as cold, with frequent snow, and predominantly exposed to north winds.

At a distance of about 2 miles (3.2 km) from Fossato, caves are found within Monte Cucco, accessed through a narrow opening and noted for their natural formations. According to tradition, about 2,000 people took refuge there in Roman times and perished when smoke was driven inside.

=== Subdivisions ===
The municipality includes the localities of Colbassano, Fossato di Vico, Osteria del Gatto, Purello.

In 2021, 155 people lived in rural dispersed dwellings not assigned to any named locality. At the time, the most populous localities were Osteria del Gatto (1,353), Purello (604), and Fossato di Vico proper (349).

== Economy ==
The economic engine of the comune is the frazione of Osteria del Gatto, in the plain below, with several factories (cheese, packaging materials). An unusual aspect of the town's economy is that the municipal government has taken advantage of the winds sweeping the Cima del Mutali to contract the construction of two windmills for electrical generation; Fossato is a net exporter of electrical energy, and the installation turns a profit used for the operations of local government.

== Religion ==
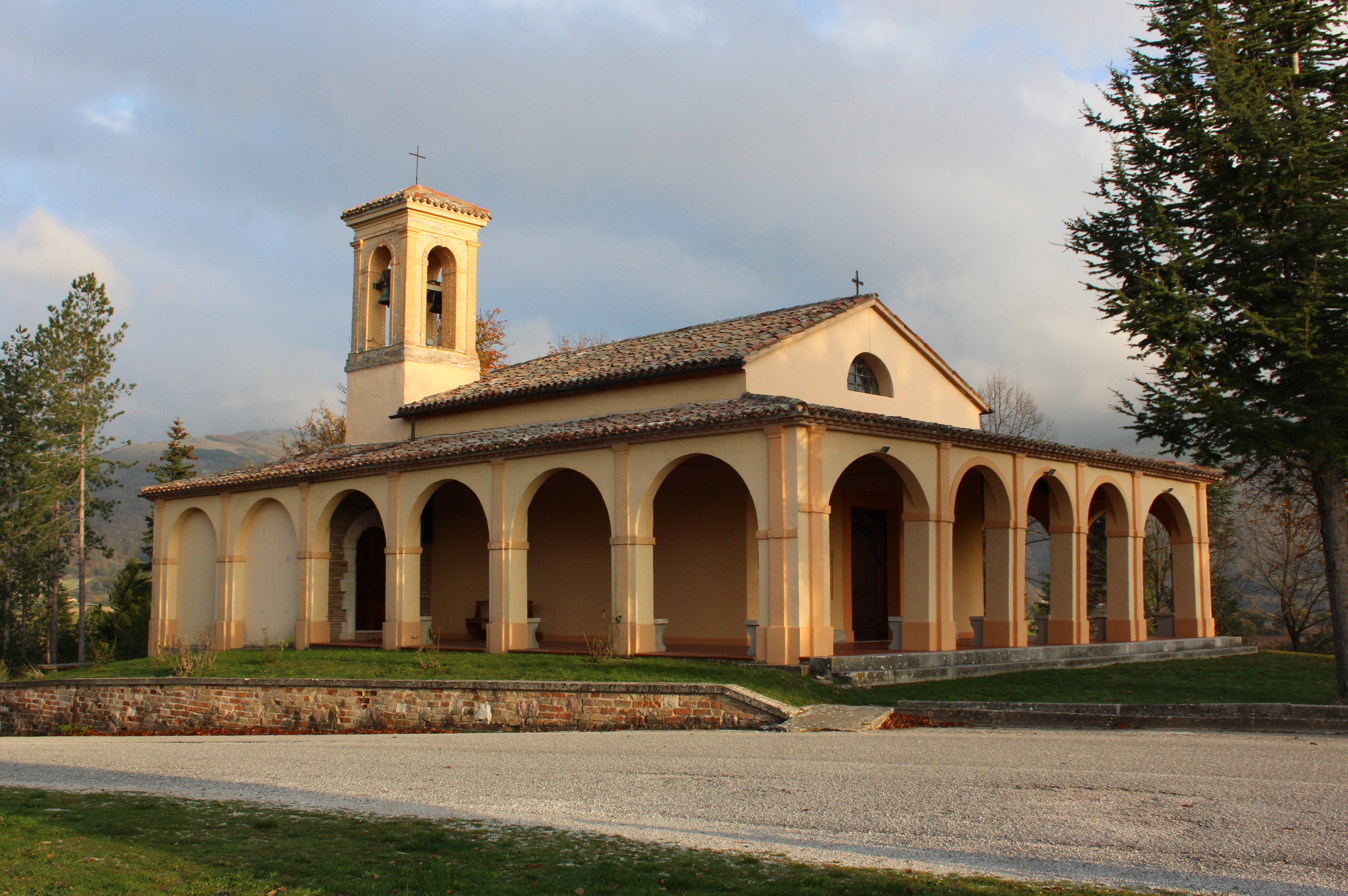
Madonna della Neve alla Ghea, with a continuous arched portico on three sides and a bell tower rising above the nave

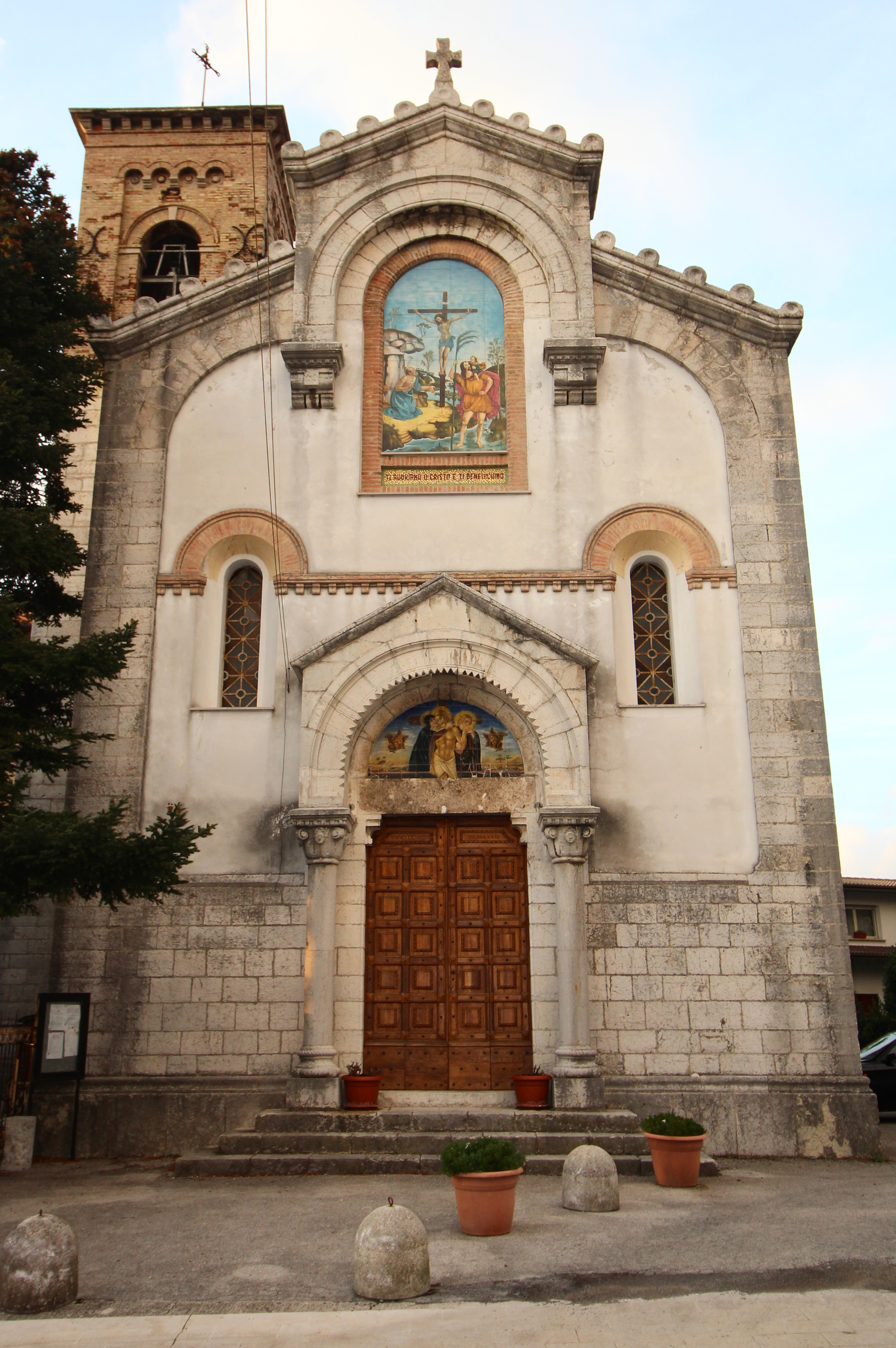
San Cristoforo, with a Neo-Romanesque front marked by mosaic panels

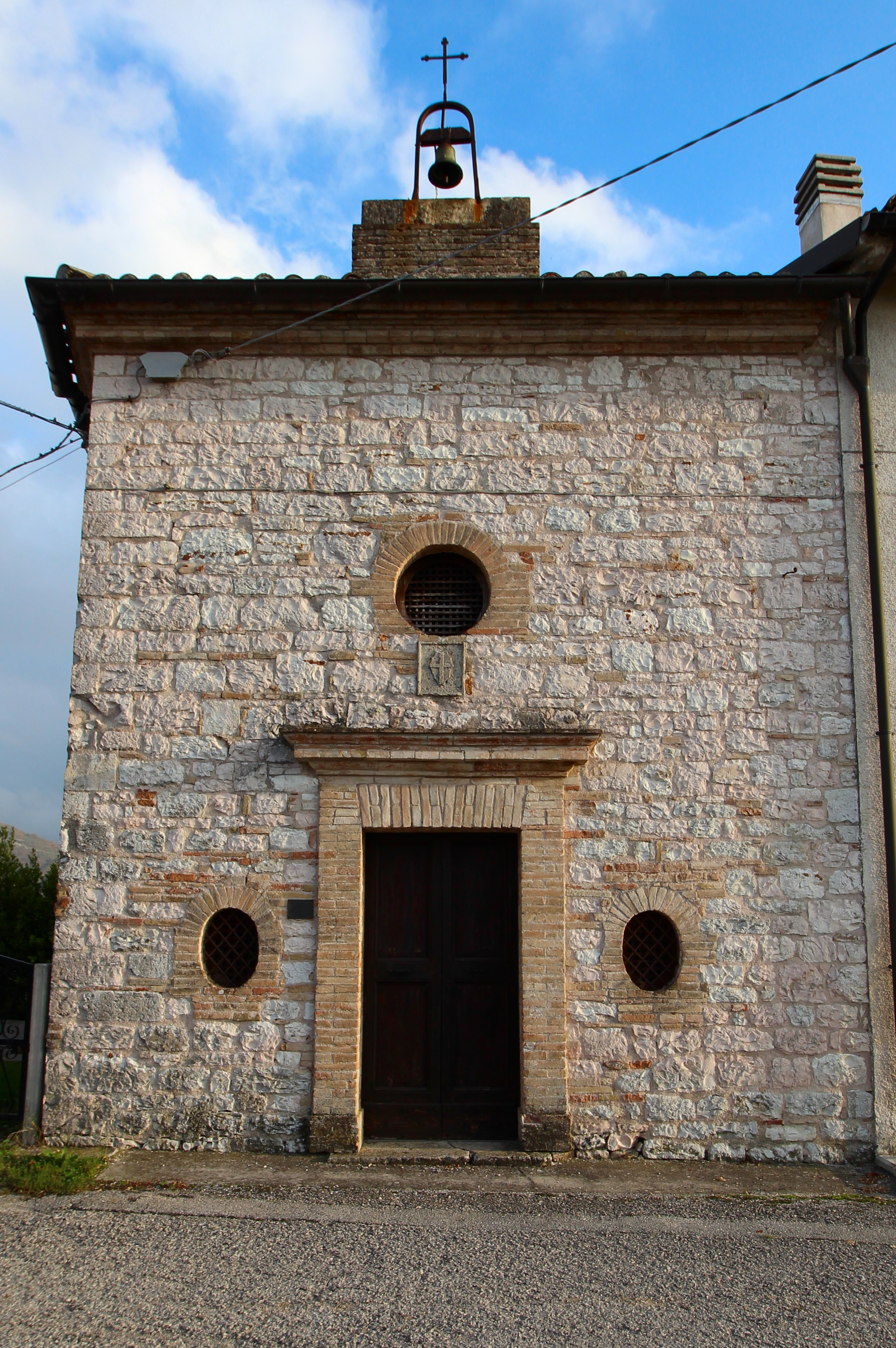
Santa Croce in Collina

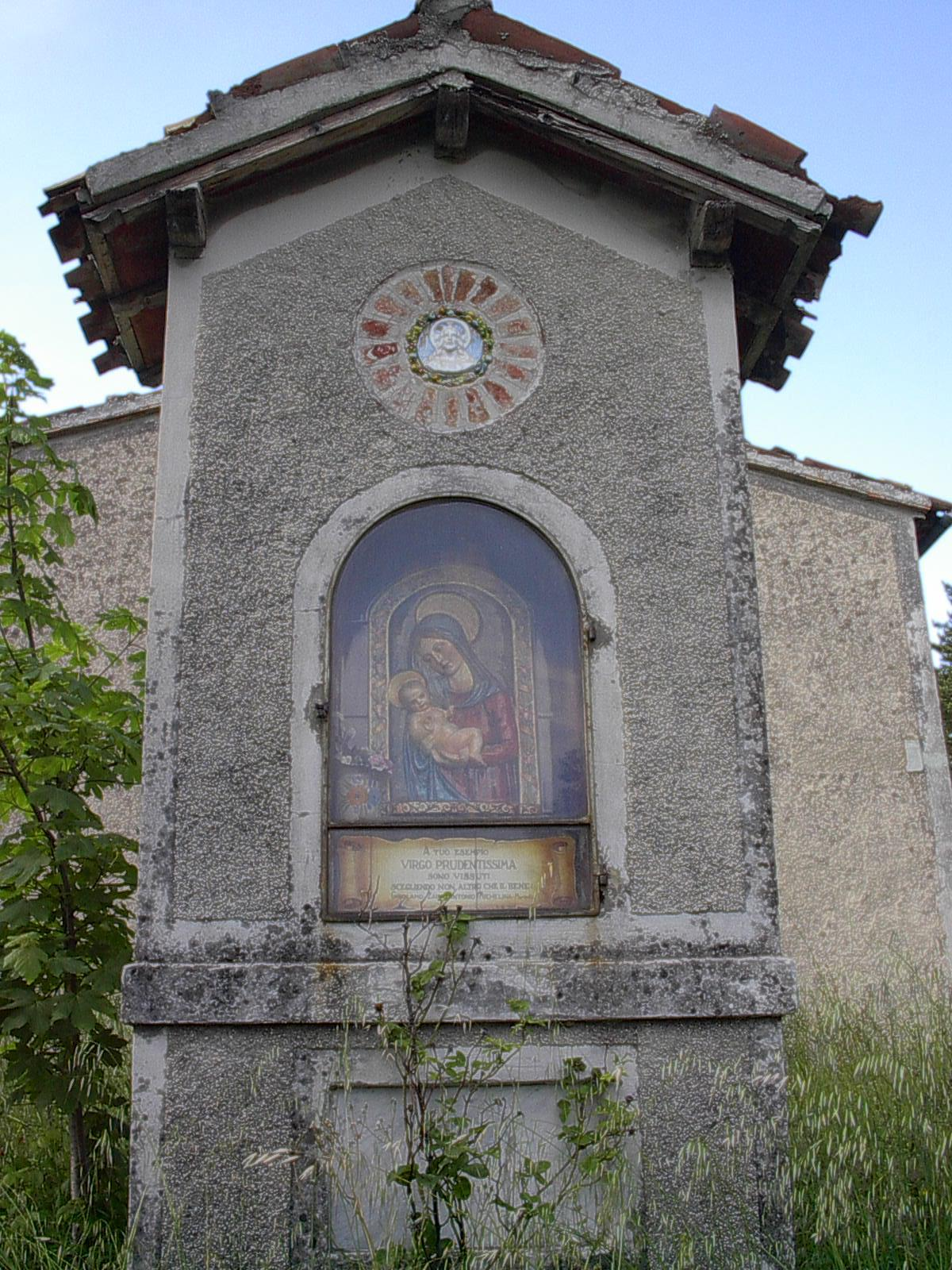
Wayside shrine in Osteria del Gatto

=== Santa Maria della Piaggiola ===
The church of Santa Maria della Piaggiola, also identified as the former seat of the Monte di Pietà, consists of a single 13th-century hall with a barrel vault. It preserves well-preserved early 15th-century frescoes by the Eugubine painter Ottaviano Nelli.

=== San Benedetto ===
The church of San Benedetto, located just outside the walls, originated as a Benedictine abbey in the 13th century. The building preserves its medieval architectural character, with two pointed portals and a trilobed single-light window. An inscription in Roman numerals on stone records the date 1337.

The interior has a central nave with a rounded arch and two side chapels with ribbed vaults. It preserves fragments of 14th- and 15th-century frescoes of the Eugubine school, including what is considered one of the earliest known portraits of a pope, identified as Urban V. The residential part of the abbey has been restored and expanded in recent decades.

=== San Pietro ===
The church of San Pietro is the oldest in Fossato and was originally founded as a Camaldolese monastery. It predates the castle, as indicated by its position outside the typical central layout of later fortified settlements.

The structure is partly excavated into the rock to the north and east, with the former monastic residence above it, accessible by a steep stairway cut into the rock. It faces a small square with medieval characteristics.

Until around 1870, the church served as the principal cemetery of the area. After falling into disuse following the transfer of the parish seat to the church of San Sebastiano, it was restored and reopened for worship about a century later. Remains of frescoes, a burial niche, and other elements are still visible. Below the church is a notable stone washhouse.

The church contains a triptych attributed to Agabiti representing the Virgin, Christ, and Saints Peter and Paul. Its sacristy preserves a chased and gilded copper chalice with figures of saints dating to the 15th century, as well as a gilded copper cross with silver and enamel elements bearing the date 1327.

=== Other religious buildings ===
The church of Santa Maria della Consolazione houses an altarpiece depicting the Virgin with Saints Roch and Sebastian, attributed to the Venetian school, and in the sacristy a painted wooden cross from the 16th century.

The church of San Cristoforo preserves a parish cross in worked copper with half-length figures of saints, dating to the 13th century.

S. Sebastiano, the 16th‑century parish church, was damaged in the 1997 Umbria and Marche earthquake but almost immediately restored.

In the plain, mention should be made of the shrine of the Madonna della Ghea.

== Culture ==
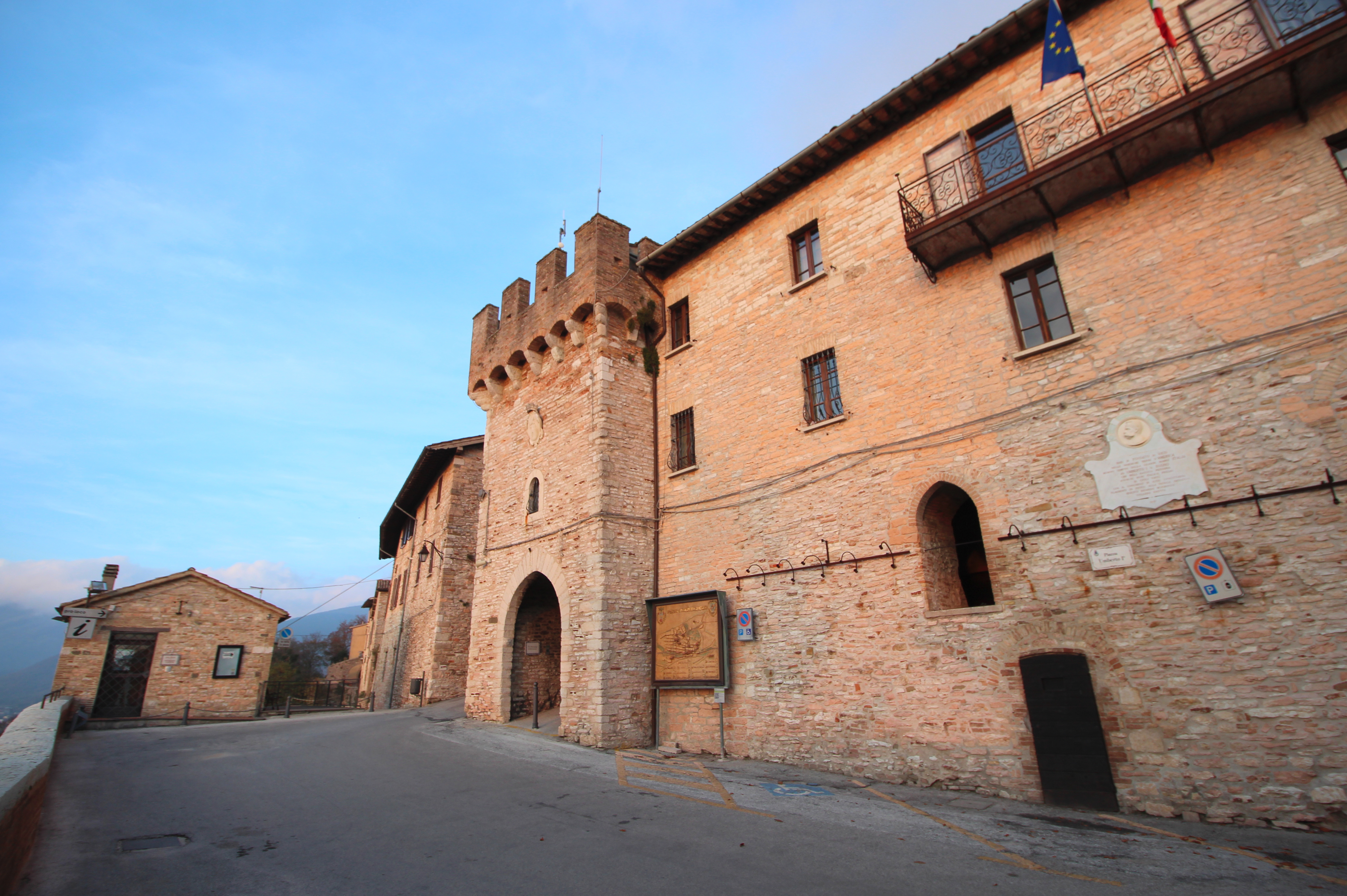
Medieval entrance tower of the Palazzo Comunale, with crenellated parapet and pointed arch gateway leading into the historic center

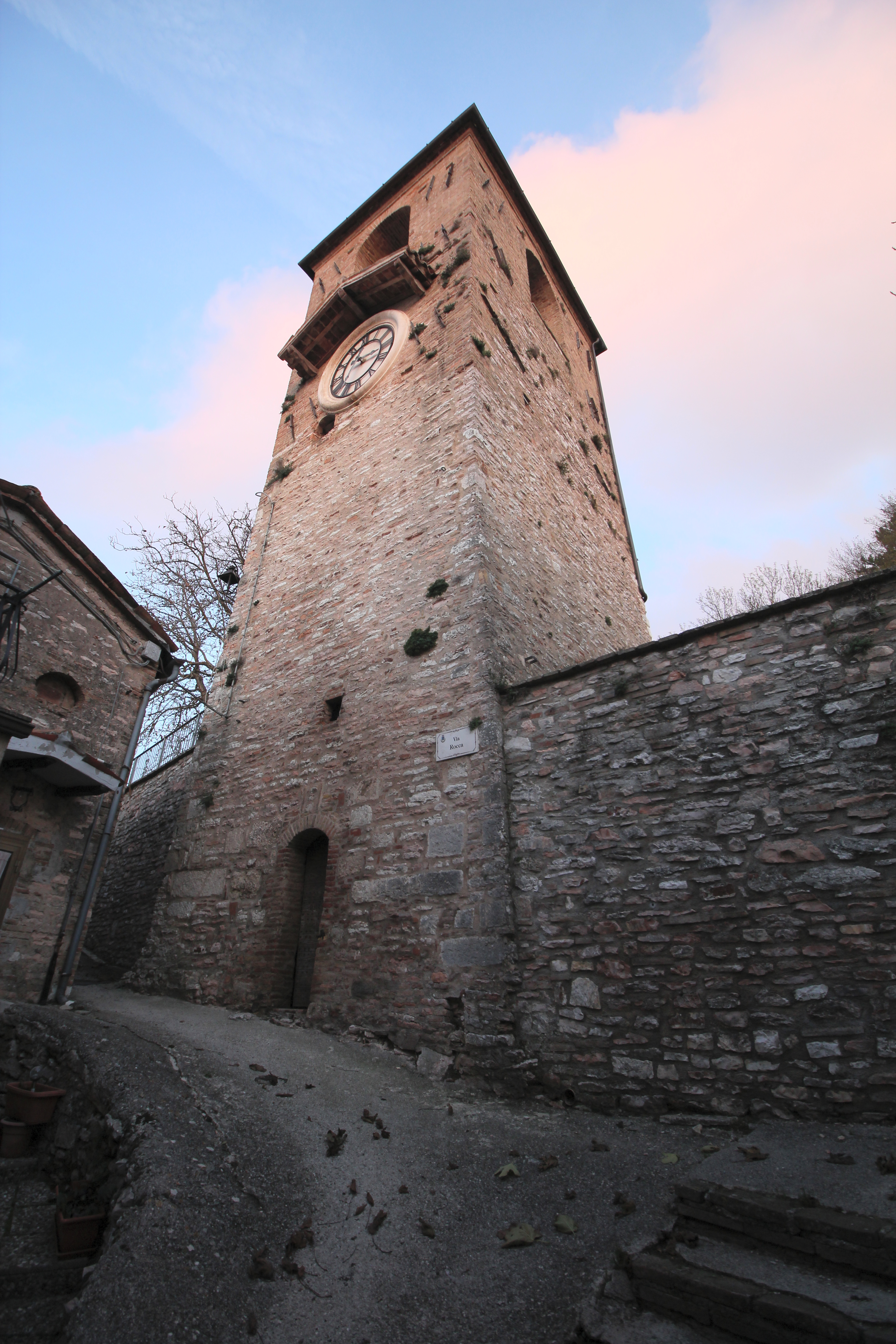
The Torre Pubblica, with a later-added clock face set into the upper section

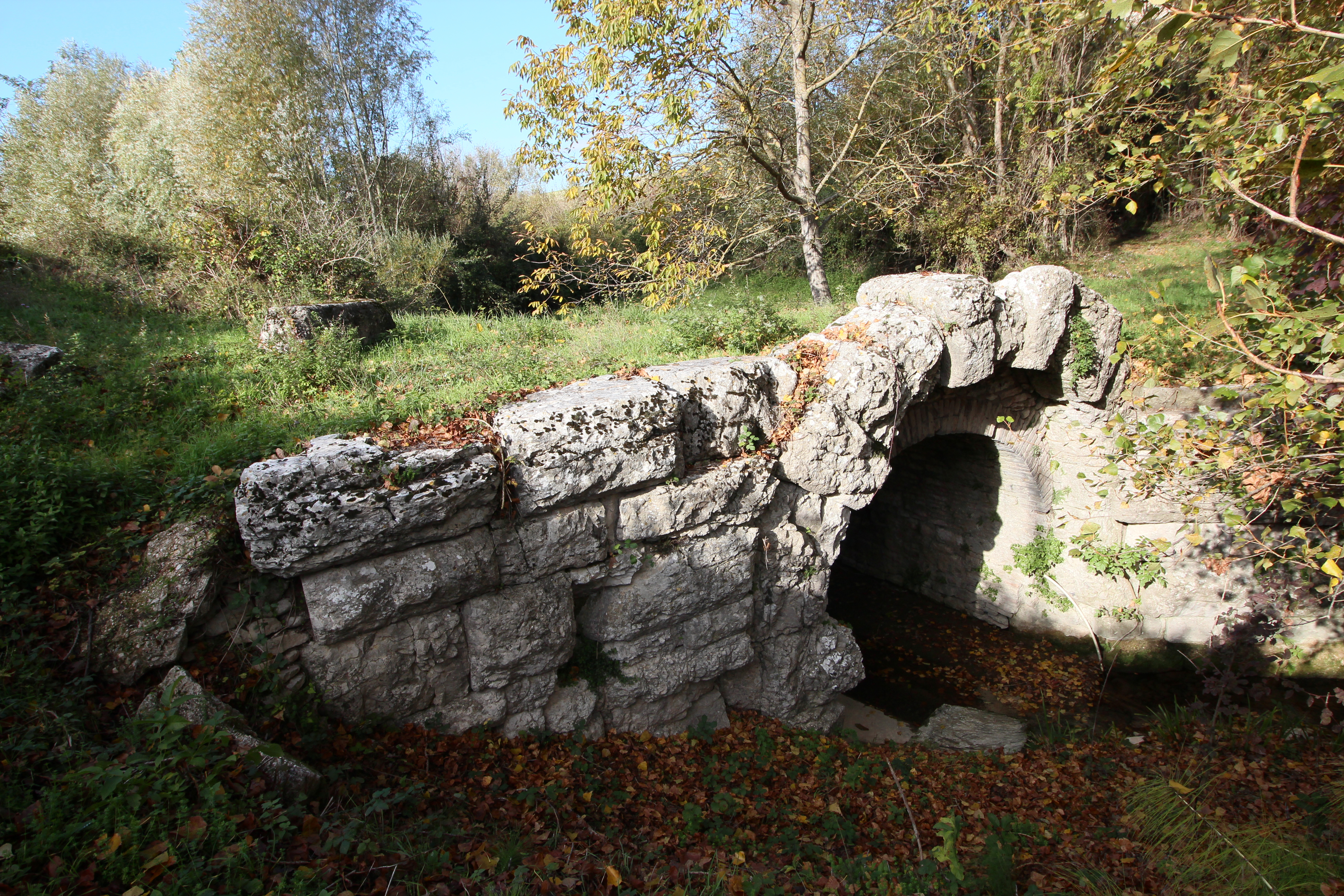
Ponte di San Giovanni, a single-arched bridge dating to the Roman period

=== Former municipal palace and tower ===
The former municipal palace and tower originated in the Middle Ages as part of the castle's defensive system, including a bertesca and an adjoining residence for guards. The structure bears the communal coat of arms alongside the Perugian griffin. It is the only surviving example of such defensive structures along the walls, which once included fourteen towers.

Later modifications include brick battlements added after the 14th century and a fortified gate dated 1536, once guarded continuously. These defenses remained in use into the 16th century.

The covered defensive passageways of Fossato di Vico represent a rare example of medieval castellated architecture combining circulation and defense along the western inner perimeter of the walls. They lead to the main gate of the castle, still in use beneath a crenellated tower. Originally, the route was uneven and connected to upper streets through covered passages beneath houses, facilitating defensive movement. Architectural features include stone barrel vaults, pointed and rounded arches, and narrow slits that served both for light and defense.

=== Other cultural heritage ===
In the vicinity of Fossato, on the slopes of the hill in the locality known as Comparone near the Via Flaminia, a Latin votive inscription was discovered in 1891, dedicated to Mars by the Vicani Helvillati. This find helped establish the location of the ancient city of Vicus Helvillum, mentioned in the Itinerarium Antonini. Other discoveries in the same area included lamps, coins, and additional ancient objects.

A rare bronze plaque with a brief inscription to the Dea Cupra in the ancient Umbrian language has been found in the territory of the comune, evidence of pre‑Roman habitation. Roman vestiges have been found as well, but not in quantities nor concentrations such as to warrant conclusively identifying Fossato with the ancient Helvillum, the site of which remains unknown: the other main candidate is Sigillo.

In the plain below, two Roman bridges are extant; both relate to the Via Flaminia.

=== Sports ===
The 5th stage of 2024 Giro d'Italia Women passed through Fossato di Vico on 11th of July.

== Notable people ==
Fermo Gherardi, born in Fossato, was made a cardinal in 1620 by Pope Paul V.
