= List of presidents of the Province of Perugia =

President of the Province of Perugia
- Presidente della Provincia di Perugia
- Incumbent; Massimiliano Presciutti since 31 March 2025
- Term length: 4 years
- Inaugural holder: Benedetto Maramotti
- Formation: 1889

The president of the Province of Perugia is the head of the provincial government in Perugia, Umbria, Italy. The president oversees the administration of the province, coordinates the activities of the municipalities, and represents the province in regional and national matters.

Since March 2025, the office has been held by Massimiliano Presciutti.

== List ==
=== Presidents of the Provincial Deputation (1889–1926) ===
Nº	Portrait	Name	Term of office		Party
Nº	Portrait	Name	Start	End	Party
1		Benedetto Maramotti	1889	1896	?
2		Rodolfo Pucci Boncambi	1896	1904	?
3		Giuseppe Contestabile della Staffa	1904	1910	?
4		Orlando Moscioni	1910	1911	?
5		Arturo Buffetti Berardi	1911	February 1916	?
6		Girolamo Girolami	March 1916	1919	?
7		Lorenzo Donati	1919	1920	?
8		Giuseppe Guardabassi	1920	1922	Italian Socialist Party
9		Felice Felicioni	1923	1924	National Fascist Party

=== Presidents of the Provincial Rectorate (1927–1944) ===
Nº	Portrait	Name	Term of office		Party
Nº	Portrait	Name	Start	End	Party
1		Guido Manganelli	2 January 1927	28 April 1929	National Fascist Party
2		Pietro Carlani	29 April 1929	24 June 1940	National Fascist Party
3		Colombo Corneli	24 June 1940	2 July 1943	National Fascist Party

=== Presidents of the Provincial Deputation (1944–1952) ===
Nº	Portrait	Name	Term of office		Party
Nº	Portrait	Name	Start	End	Party
1		Carlo Vischia	24 July 1944	9 March 1948	Christian Democracy
2		Silvio Sistarelli	9 March 1948	25 May 1952	Christian Democracy

=== Presidents of the Province (1952–present) ===
Nº	Portrait	Name	Term of office		Party
Nº	Portrait	Name	Start	End	Party
1		Mario Angelucci	25 May 1952	31 January 1964	Italian Communist Party
2		Ilvano Rasimelli	31 January 1964	7 June 1970	Italian Communist Party
3		Alfredo Ciarabelli	7 June 1970	15 June 1975	Italian Communist Party
4		Vinci Grossi	15 June 1975	4 June 1979	Italian Communist Party
5		Umberto Pagliacci	4 June 1979	18 June 1990	Italian Communist Party
6		Marcello Panettoni	18 June 1990	24 April 1995	Democratic Party of the Left
7		Mariano Borgognoni	24 April 1995	14 June 1999	Democratic Party of the Left; Democrats of the Left
8		Giulio Cozzari	14 June 1999	14 June 2004	Italian People's Party; The Daisy; Union of the Centre
8		Giulio Cozzari	14 June 2004	8 June 2009	Italian People's Party; The Daisy; Union of the Centre
9		Marco Vinicio Guasticchi	8 June 2009	14 October 2014	Democratic Party
10		Nando Mismetti	14 October 2014	31 October 2018	Democratic Party
11		Luciano Bacchetta	31 October 2018	19 October 2021	Italian Socialist Party
–		Sandro Pasquali (acting)	19 October 2021	20 December 2021	Independent (centre-left)
12		Stefania Proietti	20 December 2021	2 December 2024	Independent (centre-left)
–		Sandro Pasquali (acting)	2 December 2024	31 March 2025	Independent (centre-left)
13		Massimiliano Presciutti	31 March 2025	Incumbent	Independent (centre-left)

== Sources ==
- Menichini, Piera (2005). "I presidenti delle Province dall'Unità alla Grande guerra: repertorio analitico". Storia Amministrazione Costituzione (13): 274–275.
- "Storia amministrativa dell'ente". Ministero dell'Interno.
