= Province of Perugia =

Province of Italy

Province of Perugia Provincia di Perugia (Italian)
- Province
- Flag Coat of arms

- Location of the province of Perugia in Italy
- Coordinates: 43°6′43.56″N 12°23′19.68″E
- Country: Italy
- Region: Umbria
- Capital(s): Perugia
- Municipalities: 59

Government
  - President: Massimiliano Presciutti

Area
  - Total: 6,337.15 km^{2} (2,446.79 sq mi)

Population (2026)
  - Total: 635,988
  - Density: 100.359/km^{2} (259.928/sq mi)

GDP
  - Total: €16.436 billion (2015)
  - Per capita: €24,785 (2015)
- Time zone: UTC+1 (CET)
  - Summer (DST): UTC+2 (CEST)
- Postal code: 06010-06089, 06100
- Telephone prefix: 075, 0578, 0742, 0743
- ISO 3166 code: IT-PG
- Vehicle registration: PG
- ISTAT: 054
- Website: www.provincia.perugia.it

The province of Perugia (Italian: provincia di Perugia) is the larger of the two provinces in the region of Umbria in central Italy, comprising two-thirds of both the area and population of the region. Its capital is the city of Perugia. The province covered all of Umbria until 1927, when the province of Terni was carved out of its southern third. The province has a population of 635,988 in an area of 6,337.15 square kilometres (2,446.79 sq mi), covering about two-thirds of Umbria.

The province has numerous tourist attractions, especially artistic and historical ones, and is home to the Lake Trasimeno, the largest lake of Central Italy. It is historically the ancestral origin of the Umbri, while later it was a Roman province and then part of the Papal States until the late 19th century.

== History ==
The Etruscans likely founded Perugia in the 6th century BC. The Umbra and Tiber valleys are located in the province. The eastern part of the province is a hilly region while the rest was covered by forests. The province lies in the basin of the river Tiber and its tributaries Chiaseio, Nestore, Naja, and Chiana. The southern regions are less hilly. Silk, corn and grass are some of the most important agricultural products of the province.

The 1840 version of the Penny Cyclopaedia records that Perugia supplied almost half of the butcher's meat required in the city of Rome. The large number of cattle was fed on grass growing on the plain areas irrigated by the water of Tiber and its tributaries. After the province of Rome, Viterbo and Spoleto e Rieti the Perugian province was the fourth most important of the Papal States.

The largest lake in central Italy, Lake Trasimeno is located in the Province of Perugia. The lake has three islands – Polvese, Maggiore and Minore. The lake has a circumference of about 30 miles but is relatively shallow. It is fed by springs in the nearby hills.

Perugia was incorporated into the Kingdom of Italy in 1860, as the Province of Umbria. The province at the time was somewhat larger than the current region of Umbria, comprising Rieti to the south (now part of Lazio). It was subdivided into the districts (circondari) of Perugia, Foligno, Orvieto, Terni, Rieti and Spoleto. In 1921, the municipal council of Terni proposed the separation of the province into the new provinces of Perugia and Terni.

In 1923, Rieti together with Cittaducale were added to the province of Rome (Lazio). The remaining Province of Umbria was divided into the provinces of Perugia and Terni in 1927.

== Municipalities ==
The 59 municipalities in the province of Perugia are administered by an elected local authority which is responsible for regional planning, managing and addressing municipalities activities, environment, energy, road maintenance etc.

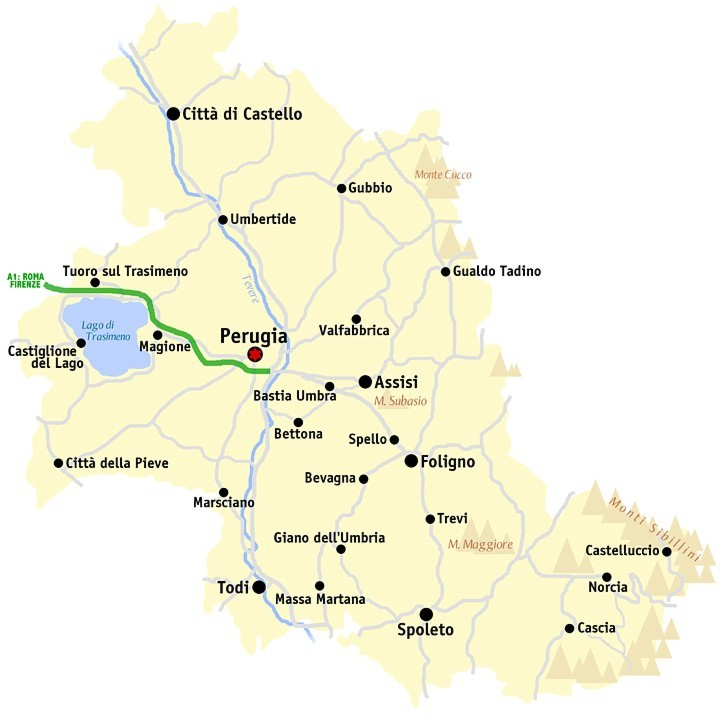
Map of the province of Perugia

- Assisi
- Bastia Umbra
- Bettona
- Bevagna
- Campello sul Clitunno
- Cannara
- Cascia
- Castel Ritaldi
- Castiglione del Lago
- Cerreto di Spoleto
- Citerna
- Città della Pieve
- Città di Castello
- Collazzone
- Corciano
- Costacciaro
- Deruta
- Foligno
- Fossato di Vico
- Fratta Todina
- Giano dell'Umbria
- Gualdo Cattaneo
- Gualdo Tadino
- Gubbio
- Lisciano Niccone
- Magione
- Marsciano
- Massa Martana
- Monte Castello di Vibio
- Monte Santa Maria Tiberina
- Montefalco
- Monteleone di Spoleto
- Montone
- Nocera Umbra
- Norcia
- Paciano
- Panicale
- Passignano sul Trasimeno
- Perugia
- Piegaro
- Pietralunga
- Poggiodomo
- Preci
- San Giustino
- Sant'Anatolia di Narco
- Scheggia e Pascelupo
- Scheggino
- Sellano
- Sigillo
- Spello
- Spoleto
- Todi
- Torgiano
- Trevi
- Tuoro sul Trasimeno
- Umbertide
- Valfabbrica
- Vallo di Nera
- Valtopina

== Demographics ==
As of 2026, the population is 635,988, of which 48.7% are male, and 51.3% are female. Minors make up 14% of the population, and seniors make up 27.2%.

Historical population
Year	Pop.	±%
1861	339,864	—
1871	367,922	+8.3%
1881	378,808	+3.0%
1901	430,105	+13.5%
1911	458,168	+6.5%
1921	493,452	+7.7%
1931	518,441	+5.1%
1936	530,985	+2.4%
1951	581,323	+9.5%
1961	570,149	−1.9%
1971	552,936	−3.0%
1981	580,988	+5.1%
1991	588,781	+1.3%
2001	605,950	+2.9%
2011	655,844	+8.2%
2021	640,482	−2.3%
Source: ISTAT

In 2007, 25 people died of consequences of drug overdose in the province of Perugia. This was the highest number of deaths recorded due to drug overdose in any Italian province.

=== Immigration ===
As of 2025, immigrants make up 14.2% of the population. The 5 largest foreign countries of birth are Romania, Albania, Morocco, Ukraine, and Ecuador.

== Sights ==
The province is well known for its medieval palaces, castles and fortresses. A few important tourist destinations of the province are the Roman amphitheatre near Porta Marzia, Cassero di Porta Sant'Angelo, Palazzo del Capitano del Popolo, Cathedral of San Lorenzo, San Bernardino's Pulpit, Piazza IV Novembre, Maggiore Fountain, National Gallery of Umbria, National Museum of Umbrian Archaeology and St Peter's bell tower in the city of Perugia; Basilica of Saint Clare, Upper Basilica of St Francis, Temple of Minerva (dates back to 1st century B.C.) and the Basilica of Santa Maria Degli Angeli in Assisi. The first Christian monk Saint Benedict was born in Norcia.

The town of Gubbio has a Roman theater which dates back to 1st century A.D.. Franciscan Path of Peace which was the path traversed by Saint Francis who left all the property he inherited from his father, connects Assisi with Gubbio. Assisi is an UNESCO World Heritage Site.

The cultural festival named "Festival dei due Mondi" held in Spoleto; Festival of the Ceri involving a candle procession to the nearby Basilica of San Ubaldo and a crossbow contest "Cross-Bow Palio" in Gubbio also attract large number of tourists. The province is also known for its cuisine which includes black truffles, Easter Pizza, lentils from Castelluccio, and salami and cured meats from Norcia.

== Gallery ==
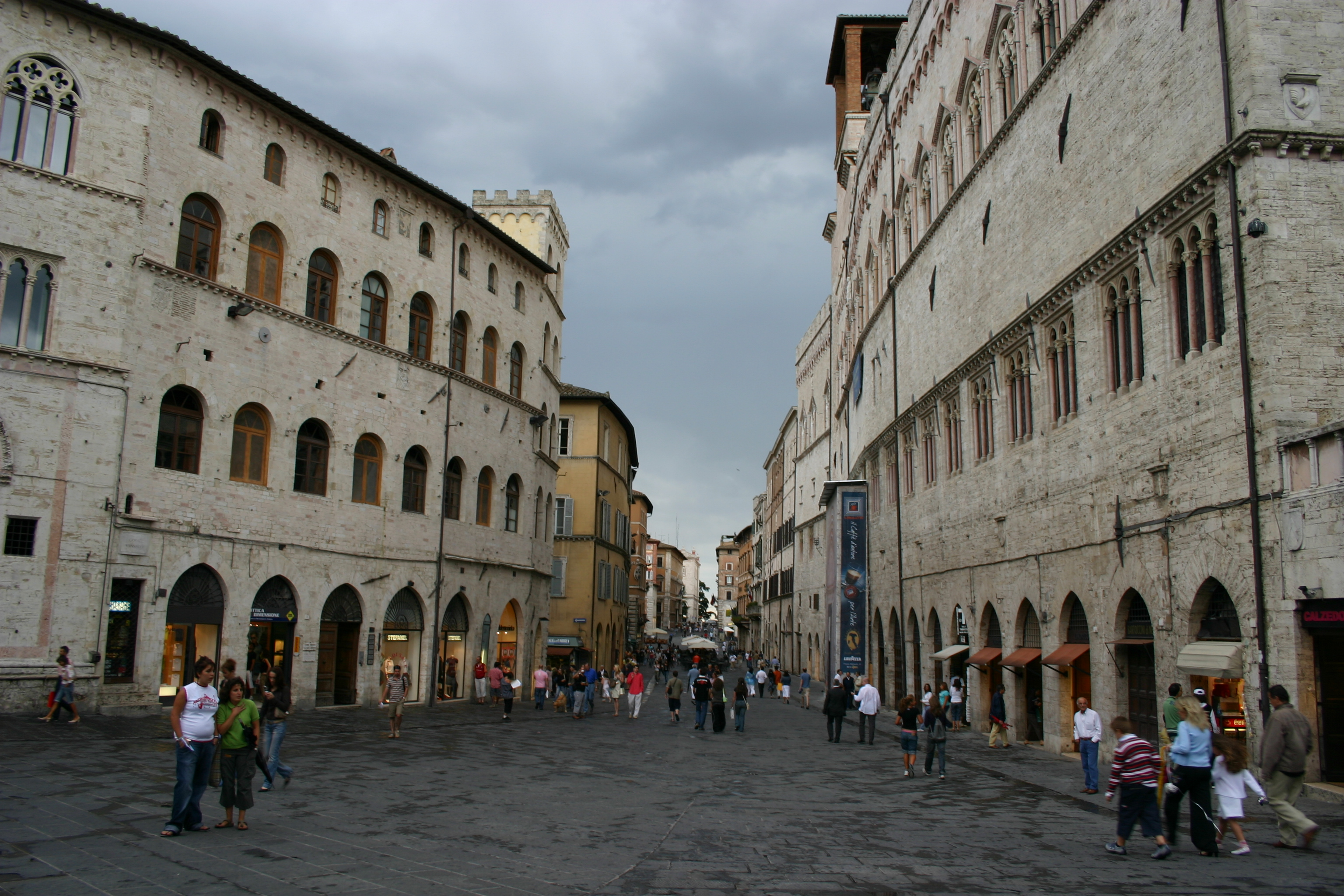
Perugia, Corso Vannucci

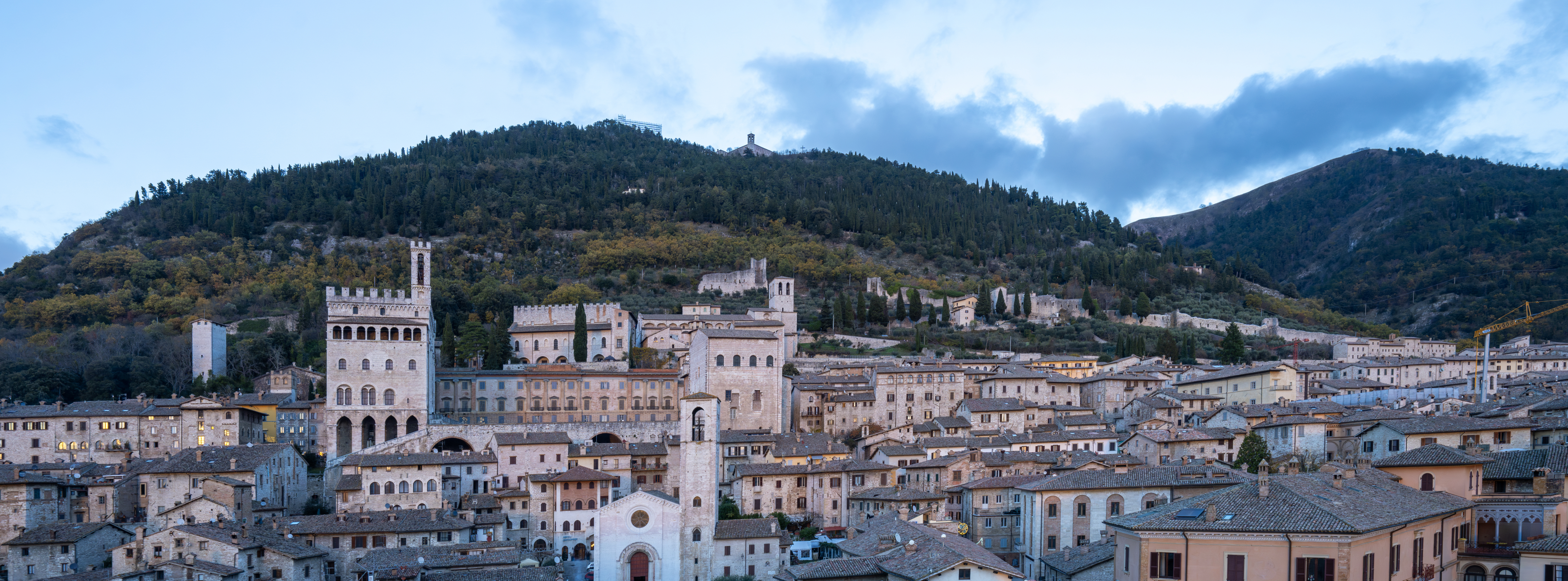
Gubbio

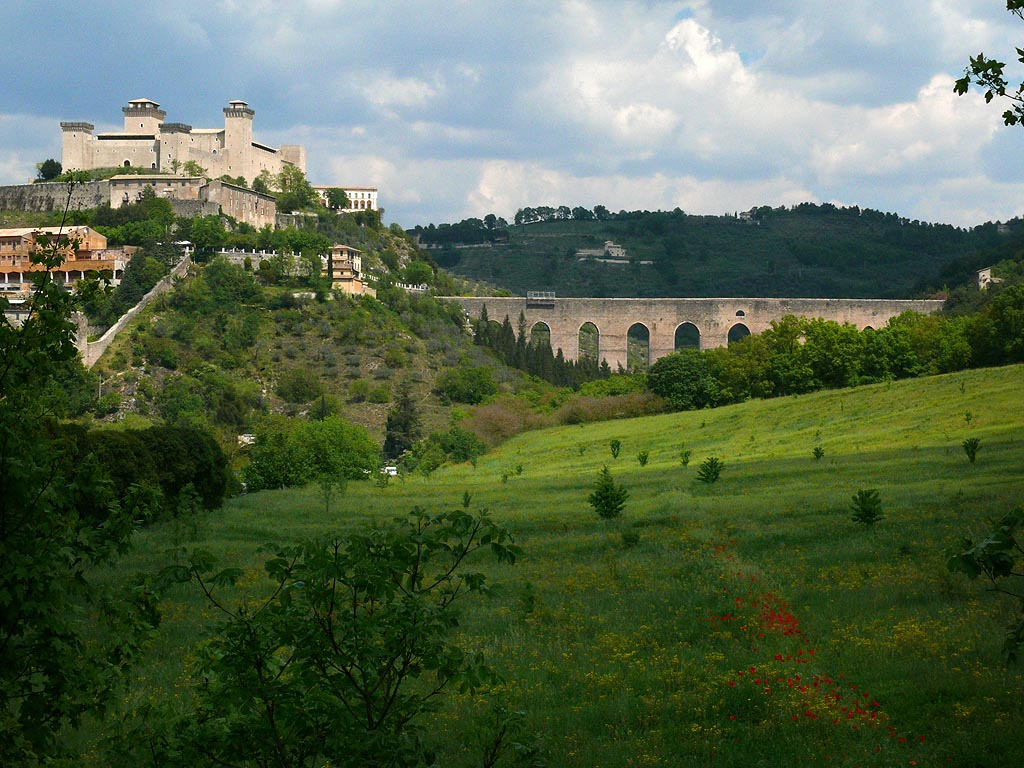
Spoleto

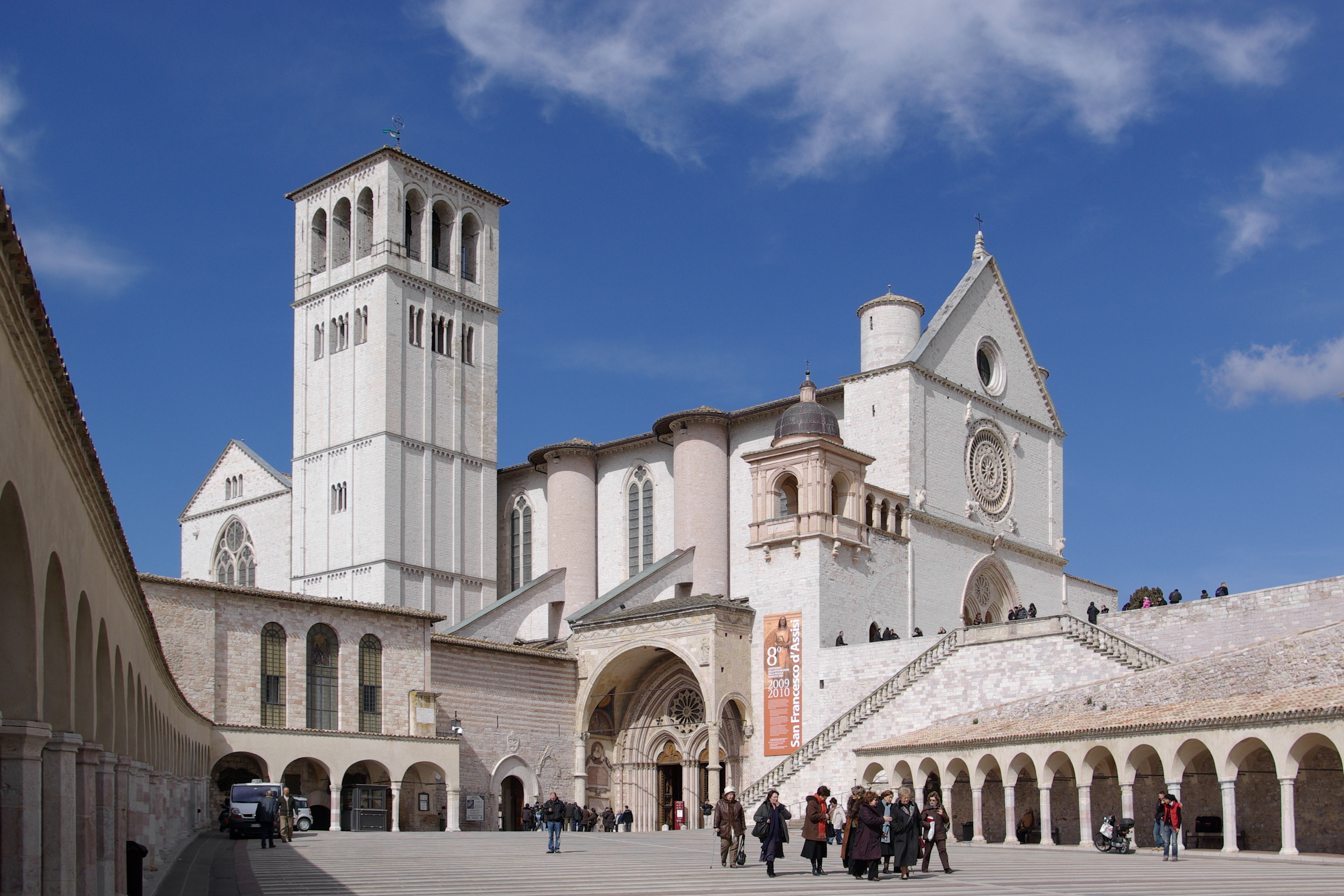
Assisi, Basilica of San Francesco

== See also ==
- Lake Arezzo
