= Proto-Indo-European numerals =

Names of numbers in the Proto-Indo-European language

The numerals and derived numbers of the Proto-Indo-European language (PIE) have been reconstructed by modern linguists based on similarities found across all Indo-European languages. The following article lists and discusses their hypothesized forms.

== Cardinal numbers ==
The cardinal numbers are reconstructed as follows:

Number	Reconstruction (Sihler)	Reconstruction (Beekes)
one	*Hoi-no-/*Hoi-wo-/*Hoi-k(ʷ)o-; *sem-	*Hoi(H)nos; sem-/sm̥-
two	*d(u)wo-	*du̯oh₁
three	*trei- (full grade) / *tri- (zero grade)	*trei̯es
four	*kʷetwor- (o-grade) / *kʷetur- (zero grade) (see also the kʷetwóres rule)	*kʷétu̯ōr
five	*penkʷe	*penkʷe
six	*s(w)eḱs; originally perhaps *weḱs	*(s)u̯éks
seven	*septm̥	*septḿ̥
eight	*(h₁)oḱtṓw or *h₃eḱtō, *h₃eḱtow	*h₃eḱteh₃
nine	*(h₁)newn̥	*(h₁)néun
ten	*déḱm̥/*deḱm̥(t)	*déḱm̥t
twenty	*wīḱm̥t-; originally perhaps *widḱomt-	*du̯idḱm̥ti
thirty	*trīḱomt-; originally perhaps *tridḱomt-	*trih₂dḱomth₂
forty	*kʷetwr̥̄ḱomt-; originally perhaps *kʷetwr̥dḱomt-	*kʷeturdḱomth₂
fifty	*penkʷēḱomt-; originally perhaps *penkʷedḱomt-	*penkʷedḱomth₂
sixty	*s(w)eḱsḱomt-; originally perhaps *weḱsdḱomt-	*u̯eksdḱomth₂
seventy	*septm̥̄ḱomt-; originally perhaps *septm̥dḱomt-	*septm̥dḱomth₂
eighty	*oḱtō(u)ḱomt-; originally perhaps *h₃eḱto(u)dḱomt-	*h₃eḱth₃dḱomth₂
ninety	*(h₁)newn̥̄ḱomt-; originally perhaps *h₁newn̥dḱomt-	*h₁neundḱomth₂
hundred	*ḱm̥tom; originally perhaps *dḱm̥tom	*dḱm̥tóm
thousand	*ǵʰeslo-; *tusdḱomti (originally "big hundred")	*ǵʰesl-

Other reconstructions typically differ only slightly from Beekes and Sihler. A nineteenth-century reconstruction (by Brugmann) for thousand is *tūsḱmtiə. See also Fortson 2004.

The elements *-dḱomt- (in the numerals "twenty" to "ninety") and *dḱm̥t- (in "hundred") are reconstructed on the assumption that these numerals are derivatives of *deḱm̥(t) "ten".

Lehmann believes that the numbers greater than ten were constructed separately in the dialect groups and that *ḱm̥tóm originally meant "a large number" rather than specifically "one hundred."

PIE	English	Gothic	Latin	Ancient Greek	Sanskrit	Iranian	Slavic	Baltic	Celtic	Armenian	Albanian	Tocharian	Hittite
*sem- "one, together"	same (< ON samr); OE sam- "together"; [also German zusammen]	sama "same"	sem-el "once", sem-per "always", sim-plex "single, simple", sin-gulī "one each, single"	heĩs, hén, mía "one" < *sems, *sem, *smiH₂	sam- "together", samá "same, equal, any"	Av hama-, OPers hama- "any, all" Past sam "even, fine"	OCS samŭ "self, alone, one"	Lith san-, są- "with"; OPrus sa-, sen- "with, dividing"	OIr samlith "at the same time"; W hafal "equal"	mi "one"	gjithë "all" < PAlb *semdza	A sas, B ṣe "one" < *sems	
*(h₁)óynos, (h₁)óywos "one"	one (< OE ān)	ains "one"	ūnus (archaic oinos)	oĩnos "one (on a die)", oĩ(w)os "alone"	(ēka- < *oi-ko-; Mitanni-Aryan aika-vartana "one turn (around a track)")	Av aēva-, OPers aiva-, (NPers yek-/yak- "one, only, alone")	OCS inŭ "one, another"	Lith víenas, OPrus ains "one"	OIr ōen, W un "one"	andr-ēn "right there", ast-ēn "right here"	? Gheg tânë, Tosk tërë "all" < PIE *tod-oino-; ??? një "one" < *ňân < PIE *eni-oino- (Note: All suggested etymologies of një "one" are highly speculative, at best. This etymology is one of two given by E. Hamp in Indo-European Numerals (Jadranka Gvozdanović, ed., 1992), pp. 903-904; the other is simply from PIE *eni- (or *H₂en-), a PIE deictic particle visible in Sanskrit anyá- "the other", OCS onŭ "that one", Lithuanian anàs "that one". Michiel de Vaan, in a review of Demiraj's Sistemi i numerimit, suggests PIE *H₂en-io-no- > pre-Proto-Albanian *ëńán > Proto-Albanian *ńâ > një. M. Huld (Basic Albanian Etymologies, p. 101) attempts to derive një from PIE *sm-iH₂, feminine of *sem "one" and reflected in Ancient Greek mía; this etymology is also tentatively suggested in Don Ringe et al. "IE and Computational Cladistics", p. 75 (Transactions of the Philological Society 100, 2002).)	B -aiwenta "group" < "*unit"	ās "one"
*dwóh₁, neut. *dwóy(H₁) "two"	two (< OE twā)	twái (fem. twōs, neut. twa) "two"	duo "two"	dúō "two"	dvā́(u) "two"	Av dva, fem. neut. baē "two"; NPers do "two"; Kurd diwa "two (fem.)"	OCS dŭva "two"	Lith dù, OPrus dwai "two"	OIr da, W dau (fem. dwy) "two"	erku "two"	dy "two"	A wu, B wi "two"(<PTC *tuwó)	dā-, ta-; HLuw tuwa/i- "two"; Lyc kbi- "two"; Mil tba "two" (Note: For example, qñnã-tba "twelve" (litt. "ten" plus "two").)
*tréyes (fem. *tisres, neut. *tríH₂) "three"	three (< OE þrīe)	þreis "three"	trēs "three"	treĩs "three"	tráyas (fem. tisrás) "three"	Av θrayō, θrayas (fem. tisrō, neut. θri), OPers çi-, Parth hrē "three"	OCS trĭje "three"	Lith trỹs, OPrus tris, Latg treis "three"	OIr trí (fem. téoir), W tri (fem. tair, teir) "three"	erekʿ "three"	tre masc., tri fem. "three"	A tre, B trai "three"	tri- "three"; teriyas- (gen. pl.)
*kʷetwóres (fem. *kʷétesres, neut. *kʷetwṓr) "four"	four (< OE fēower)	fidwor "four" (In Germanic influenced by pénkʷe "five")	quattuor "four" (Note: See also: Umb peturpursus "quadruped".)	téssares "four"	masc. catvā́ras (acc. catúras), neut. catvā́ri, fem. cátasras "four"	Av masc. čaθwārō (acc. čaturąm), fem. čataŋrō "four"; NPers čahār "four"; Kurd çwar	OCS četyre "four"	Lith keturì, OPrus ketturei "four" (Note: Cf. Thr ketri- "four".)	Gaul petuar[ios] "four" OIr ceth(a)ir (fem. cethēoir, influenced by fem. tēoir "three") "four"; W pedwar (fem. pedair) "four"	čʿorkʿ, kʿaṙ (rare) "four	katër "four"	A śtwar, B śtwer "four"	(remodelled in Hittite and Luwian); Lyc teteri
*pénkʷe "five"	five (< OE fīf)	fimf "five"	quīnque "five" (Note: See also: Osc pomp- "five".)	pénte "five"	páñca "five"; Mitanni-Aryan panza- "five"	Av panča "five"; Kurd pênc/pênz	OCS pętĭ "five"	Lith penkì, OPrus penkei "five" (Note: See also Phry pinke "five".)	Gaul pinpe-, pompe "five" OIr cóic, W pum(p) "five"	hing "five"	pesë "five"	A päñ, B piś "five"	Luw paⁿta "five"
*swéḱs "six"	six (< OE siex)	sáihs "six"	sex "six"	héx, dial. wéx "six"	ṣáṣ "six"	Av xšvaš "six"	OCS šestĭ "six"	Lith šešì, OPrus uššai "six"	Celtib sues "six"; Gaul suexos "sixth"; OIr sé, W chwe(ch) "six"	vecʿ "six"	gjashtë "six"	A ṣäk, B ṣkas "six"	
*septḿ̥ "seven"	seven (< OE seofon)	sibun "seven"	septem "seven"	heptá "seven"	saptá "seven"; Mitanni-Aryan šatta- "seven"	Av hapta, NPers haft-, "seven"	OCS sedmĭ "seven"	Lith septynì, OPrus septinnei "seven"	OIr secht, W saith "seven"	eawtʿn "seven"	shtatë "seven"	A ṣpät, B ṣukt "seven"	sipta- "seven"
*h₁oḱtṓ(w) "eight"	eight (< OE eahta)	ahtáu "eight"	octō "eight"	oktṓ "eight"	aṣṭā́(u) "eight"	Av ašta "eight"	OCS osmĭ "eight" (Note: Built upon osmŭ "eighth" < *H₁ok̂t-mo-.)	Lith aštuonì, OPrus astonei, Latg ostoni "eight"	Gaul oxtu- "eight" OIr ocht n- "eight"; (Note: With nasalization after *septḿ̥ "seven".) W wyth "eight"	utʿ "eight"	tetë "eight" < *H₁ok̂tō-t-	A okät, B okt "eight"	Lyc aitãta "eight"
*(h₁)néwn̥ "nine"	nine (< OE nigon)	niun "nine"	novem "nine"	ennéa "nine"	náva "nine"	Av nava, NPers noh- "nine"	OCS devętĭ "nine" < *newn̥-ti- (Influenced by *dékm̥t "ten")	Lith devynì (influenced by *dékm̥t "ten"), OPrus newinei "nine"	OIr noí n-, W naw "nine"	inn "nine"	nëntë "nine" < *newn̥-ti-	AB ñu	Lyc nuñtãta "nine"
*déḱm̥t "ten"	ten (< OE tien)	taíhun "ten"	decem "ten"	déka "ten"	dáśa "ten"	Av dasa, NPers dah- "ten"	OCS desętĭ "ten"	Lith dẽšimt, OPrus desimtan "ten"	Gaul decam- "ten"; Celtib tekam- "ten"; OIr deich, W deg, deng "ten"	tasn "ten"	dhjetë "ten" < *dék̂m̥t-i-	A śäk, B śak "ten"	(Note: There is the possibility that Lycian sñta could mean either "ten" or "(one) hundred".)
*wídḱm̥ti(h₁) "twenty" < *dwi-dḱm̥t-i(h₁) "two tens"	(remodelled)	(remodelled)	vīgintī "twenty"	eíkosi "twenty"	viṁśatí "twenty", dviṁśatí "twenty"	Av vīsaiti, Ossetian insäi "twenty"	(remodelled)	(remodelled)	OIr fiche (fichet), OW uceint "twenty"	kʿsan "twenty"	zet "twenty"	A wiki, B ikäṃ "twenty"	
*ḱm̥tóm "hundred" < *dḱm̥tóm	hundred (< OE hund, hund-red)	hunda (pl.) "hundred"	centum "hundred"	he-katón "hundred"	śatám "hundred"	Av satǝm "hundred"	OCS sŭto "hundred"	Lith šim̃tas, OPrus simtan "hundred"	OIr cét, W can(t) "hundred"		qind "hundred" (possibly borrowed from Latin centum)	A känt, B kante "hundred"	
*ǵʰéslom "thousand"			mīlle "thousand" < PIE *sm-ih₂-ǵʰésl-ih₂	kʰī́lioi "thousand" < PIE *ǵʰesl-i-yoy	sahásra "thousand" < PIE *sm̥-ǵʰéslom	Av hazaŋra "thousand" < PIE *sm̥-ǵʰéslom							
*tuHsont- "thousand"	thousand (< OE þūsend)	þūsundi "thousand"					OCS tysǫšti "thousand"	Lith tūkstantis; OPrus tusimtons "thousand"					

=== Gender of numerals ===
The numbers three and four had feminine forms with the suffix *-s(o)r-, reconstructed as *t(r)i-sr- and *kʷetwr̥-sr-, respectively.

== Numerals as prefixes ==
Special forms of the numerals were used as prefixes, usually to form bahuvrihis (like five-fingered in English):

Number	Prefix (Fortson)
one- (together, same)	*sm̥-
two-	*dwi-
three-	*tri-
four-	*kʷ(e)tru- or *kʷetwr̥-

== Ordinal numbers ==
The ordinal numbers are difficult to reconstruct due to their significant variation in the daughter languages. The following reconstructions are tentative:

- "first" is formed with *pr̥h₃- (related to some adverbs meaning "forth, forward, front" and to the particle *prō "forth", thus originally meaning "foremost" or similar) plus various suffixes like *-mo-, *-wo- (cf. Latin primus, Russian perv-).
- "second": The daughter languages use a wide range of expressions, often unrelated to the word for "two" (including Latin and English), so that no PIE form can be reconstructed. A number of languages use the form derived from *h₂enteros meaning "the other [of two]" (cf. OCS vĭtorŭ, Lithuanian añtras, Old Icelandic annarr, modern Icelandic annar).
- "third" to "sixth" were formed from the cardinals plus the suffix *-t(ó)-: *tr̥-t(ó)- / *tri-t(ó)- "third" etc.
- "seventh" to "tenth" were formed by adding the thematic vowel *-ó- to the cardinal: *oḱtow-ó- "eighth" etc.

The cardinals ending in a syllabic nasal (seven, nine, ten) inserted a second nasal before the thematic vowel, resulting in the suffixes *-mó- and *-nó-. These and the suffix *-t(ó)- spread to neighbouring ordinals, seen for example in Vedic aṣṭamá- "eighth" and Lithuanian deviñtas "ninth".

== Reflexes ==
Reflexes, or descendants of the PIE reconstructed forms in its daughter languages, include the following.

=== Reflexes of the cardinal numbers ===
Number	Reconstruction (Sihler)	Reflexes
one	*Hoi-no-	Alb. njã > një (dialectal nji/njo), Lith. vienas, Latv. viens, Gaul. oinos, Gm. ein/eins, Eng. ān/one, Gk. οἶος oîos, Av. aēuua, Ir. óin/aon, Kashmiri akh, Lat. ūnus, Roman. unu, Osc. uinus, OCS edinŭ, ON einn, OPruss. aīns, Osset. iu/ieu, Pers. aiva-/yek, Kamviri ev, Pol. jeden, Russ. odin, Ved. aika, Umbr. uns, Goth. ains, Welsh un, Kurdish (Kurmanji) yek/êk
one	*sem-	Arm. mi/mek/meg, Alb. gjithë, Lith. sa, sav-as, Eng. sum/some, Gm. saman/zusammen, Gk. εἷς heîs, Hitt. san, Av. hakeret, Ir. samail/samhail, Lat. semel, Lyc. sñta, Kamviri sâ~, Pers. hama/hamin, Russ. odin, yedin, perviy Ved. sakŕ̥t, Toch. sas/ṣe, Welsh hafal, ON sami, Goth. sama
two	*du(w)o-	Hitt. dā-, Luv. tuwa/i-, Lyc. kbi-, Mil. tba-, Ved. dvā(u), Av. duua, Pers. duva/do, Osset. dyuuæ/duuæ, Kashmiri zū', Kamviri dü, Gk. δύο dúo, Lat. duō, Osc. dus, Umbr. tuf, Roman. doi, ON tveir, Goth. twai, Eng. twā/two, Gm. zwêne/zwei, Gaul. vo, Ir. dá/dó, Welsh dau, Arm. erkow/yerku/yergu, Toch. wu/wi, OPruss. dwāi, Latv. divi, Lith. dù, OCS dŭva, Pol. dwa, Russ. dva, Alb. dy;di/dy;dў, Kurdish (Kurmanji) du
three	*trei-	Hitt. teriyaš (gen. pl.), Lyc. trei, Ved. tráyas, Av. θrāiiō, Pers. çi/se, Osset. ærtæ/ærtæ, Kashmiri tre, Kamviri tre, Gk. τρεῖς treîs, Lat. trēs, Osc. trís, Umbr. trif, Roman. trei, ON þrír, Goth. þreis, Eng. þrēo/three, Gm. drī/drei, Gaul. treis, Ir. treí/trí, Welsh tri, Arm. erek῾/yerek῾/yerek῾, Toch. tre/trai, OPruss. tri, Latv. trīs, Lith. trỹs, OCS trije, Pol. trzy, Russ. tri, Alb. tre/tre. Kurdish (Kurmanji) sê
four	*kʷetwor-	Lyc. teteri, Ved. catvāras, Av. caθuuārō, Pers. /čahār, Osset. cyppar/cuppar, Kashmiri tsor, Kamviri što, Gk. τέτταρες téttares, Lat. quattuor, Osc. petora, Roman. patru, Umbr. petor, ON fjórir, Goth. fidwor, Eng. fēower/four, Gm. feor/vier, Gaul. petor, Ir. cethir/ceathair, Welsh pedwar, Arm. čork῾/čors/čors, Toch. śtwar/śtwer, OPruss. keturjāi, Latv. četri, Lith. keturì, OCS četyre, Pol. cztery, Russ. četyre, Alb. katër;katrë/katër, Kurdish (Kurmanji) çar
five	*pénkʷe	Luv. pa^{n}ta, Ved. pañca, Av. panca, Pers. panča/panj, Osset. fondz/fondz, Kashmiri pā.~tsh Kamviri puč, Gk. πέντε pénte, Lat. quīnque, Roman. cinci, Osc. pompe, Umbr. pumpe, ON fimm, Goth. fimf, Eng. fīf/five, Gm. fimf/fünf, Gaul. pempe, Ir. cóic/cúig, Welsh pump, Arm. hing/hing/hink, Toch. päñ/piś, OPruss. pēnkjāi, Latv. pieci, Lith. penkì, OCS pętĭ, Pol. pięć, Russ. pjat', Alb. pesë/pes(ë);pês, Kurdish (Kurmanji) pênc
six	*s(w)eḱs	Ved. ṣáṣ, Av. xšuuaš, Pers. /šeš, Osset. æxsæz/æxsæz, Kashmiri śe, Kamviri ṣu, Gk. ἕξ héx, Lat. sex, Osc. sehs, Umbr. sehs, ON sex, Goth. saíhs, Eng. siex/six, Gm. sëhs/sechs, Gaul. suex, Ir. sé/sé, Welsh chwech, Arm. vec῾/vec῾/vec῾, Toch. ṣäk/ṣkas, OPruss. usjai, Latv. seši, Lith. šešì, OCS šestĭ, Pol. sześć, Roman. șase, Russ. šest', Alb. gjashtë/gjasht(ë);xhasht, Kurdish (Kurmanji) şeş
seven	*septḿ̥	Hitt. šipta-, Ved. saptá, Av. hapta, Pers. hafta/haft, Osset. avd/avd, Kashmiri sath, Kamviri sut, Gk. ἑπτά heptá, Lat. septem, Osc. seften, Roman. șapte, ON sjau, Goth. sibun, Eng. seofon/seven, Gm. sibun/sieben, Gaul. sextan, Ir. secht/seacht, Welsh saith, Arm. ewt῾n/yot῾/yot῾ě, Toch. ṣpät/ṣukt, OPruss. septīnjai, Lith. septynì, Latv. septiņi, OCS sedmĭ, Pol. siedem, Russ. sem', Alb. shtatë/shtat(ë), Kurdish (Kurmanji) heft
eight	*h₃eḱtō	Lyc. aitãta-, Ved. aṣṭā(u), Av. ašta, Pers. ašta/hašt, Osset. ast/ast, Kashmiri ā.ṭh, Kamviri uṣṭ, Gk. ὀκτώ oktṓ, Lat. octō, Roman. opt, Osc. uhto, ON átta, Goth. ahtau, Eng. eahta/eight, Gm. ahto/acht, Gaul. oxtū, Ir. ocht/ocht, Welsh wyth, Arm. owt῾/ut῾ě, Toch. okät/okt, OPruss. astōnjai, Latv. astoņi, Lith. aštuonì, OCS osmĭ, Pol. osiem, Russ. vosem', Alb. tëte/tet(ë), Kurdish (Kurmanji) heşt
nine	*(h₁)newn̥	Lyc. ñuñtãta-, Ved. nava, Av. nauua, Pers. nava/noh, Kashmiri nav, Kamviri nu, Gk. ἐννέ(ϝ)α enné(w)a, Lat. novem, Osc. nuven, Umbr. nuvim, Roman. nouă, ON níu, Goth. niun, Eng. nigon/nine, Gm. niun/neun, Gaul. navan, Ir. nói/naoi, Welsh naw, Arm. inn/inn/inně, TochA. ñu, OPruss. newīnjai, Latv. deviņi, Lith. devynì, OCS devętĭ, Pol. dziewięć, Russ. devjat', Alb. nëntë/nëndë/nând(ë);non(t), Kurdish (Kurmanji) neh, no
ten	*deḱm̥(t)	Ved. dáśa, Av. dasa, Pers. daθa/dah, Osset. dæs/dæs, Kashmiri da.h, Kamviri duc, Gk. δέκα déka, Lat. decem, Osc. deken, Umbr. desem, Roman. zece, ON tíu, Goth. taíhun, Eng. tīen/ten, Gm. zëhen/zehn, Gaul. decam, Ir. deich/deich, Welsh deg, Arm. tasn/tas/dasě, Toch. śäk/śak, OPruss. desīmtan, Latv. desmit, Lith. dẽšimt, OCS desętĭ, Pol. dziesięć, Russ. desjat', Alb. dhjetë/dhet(ë), Kurdish (Kurmanji) deh, de
twenty	*wīḱm̥t-	Ved. viṁśatí-, Av. vīsaiti, Pers. /bēst, Kashmiri vuh, Kamviri vici, Doric ϝίκατι wíkati, Lat. vīgintī, Gaul. vocontio, Ir. fiche/fiche, M. Welsh ugein(t), Arm. k῾san/k῾san/k῾san, Toch. wiki/ikäṃ, Lith. dvi-de-šimt, Alb. njëzet/njizet, Kurdish (Kurmanji) bîst
thirty	*trīḱomt-	Skr. triṅśat, Gk. τριάκοντα triákonta, Lat. trīgintā, Ir. trícho/tríocha, Lith. tris-de-šimt, Kurdish (Kurmanji) sih, sî
forty	*kʷetwr̥̄ḱomt-	Skr. catvāriṅśat, Gk. τεσσαράκοντα tessarákonta, Lat. quadrāgintā, Ir. cethorcho/ceathracha, Lith. keturias-de-šimt, Kurdish (Kurmanji) çil
fifty	*penkʷēḱomt-	Skr. pañcāśat, Gk. πεντήκοντα pentḗkonta, Lat. quinquāgintā, Ir. coíca/caoga, Lith. penkias-de-šimt, Kurdish (Kurmanji) pênceh, pêncî
sixty	*s(w)eḱsḱomt-	Skr. ṣaṣṭih, Gk. ἑξήκοντα hexḗkonta, Lat. sexāgintā, Ir. sesca/seasca, Lith. šešias-de-šimt, Russ. šest'desjat, Kurdish (Kurmanji) şêst
seventy	*septm̥̄ḱomt-	Skr. saptatih, Gk. ἑβδομήκοντα hebdomḗkonta, Lat. septuāgintā, Ir. sechtmoga/seachtó, Lith. septynias-de-šimt, Russ. sem'desjat, Kurdish (Kurmanji) heftê
eighty	*h₃eḱtō(u)ḱomt-	Skr. aśītih, Gk. ὀγδοήκοντα ogdoḗkonta, Lat. octōgintā, Ir. ochtmoga/ochtó, Lith. aštuonias-de-šimt, Russ. vosem'desjat, Kurdish (Kurmanji) heştê
ninety	*(h₁)newn̥̄ḱomt-	Skr. navatih, Gk. ἐνενήκοντα enenḗkonta, Lat. nōnāgintā, Ir. nócha/nócha, Lith. devynias-de-šimt, Russ. devjanosto, Kurdish (Kurmanji) not, newet
hundred	*ḱm̥tom	Ved. śatám, Av. satəm, Roman. sută, Pers. /sad, Osset. sædæ, Kashmiri śath, Gk. ἑκατόν hekatón, Lat. centum, ON hundrað, Goth. hund, Eng. hundred/hundred, Gm. hunt/hundert, Gaul. cantam, Ir. cét/céad, Welsh cant, Toch. känt/kante, Latv. simts, Lith. šim̃tas, OCS sŭto, Pol. sto, Russ. sto/sotnja, Kurdish (Kurmanji) sed
thousand	*(sm̥-)ǵʰéslo-	Skr. sahasram, Av. hazarəm, Pers. /hazār, Gk. χίλιοι khílioi, Lat. mīlle, Kurdish (Kurmanji) hezar
thousand	*tusdḱomti	ON þúsund, Goth. þūsundi, Eng. þūsend/thousand, Gm. þūsunt/tausend, TochA. tmāṃ, TochB. tmāne/tumane, Lith. tūkstantis, Latv. tūkstots, OCS tysǫšti, Pol. tysiąc, Russ. tys'ača
thousand	*wel-tyo-	Toch. wälts/yaltse; OCS velьjь/velikъ

In the following languages, reflexes separated by slashes mean:

- Albanian: Tosk Albanian / Gheg Albanian
- Armenian: Classical Armenian / Eastern Armenian / Western Armenian
- English: Old English / Modern English
- German: Old High German / New High German
- Irish: Old Irish / Modern Irish
- Ossetic: Iron / Digor
- Persian: Old Persian / Modern Persian
- Tocharian: Tocharian A / Tocharian B

=== Reflexes of the feminine numbers ===
Number	Reconstruction	Reflexes
three	*t(r)i-sr-	Ved. tisrás, Av. tišrō, Gaul. tidres, Ir. teoir/?
four	*kʷetwr̥-sr-	Ved. cátasras, Av. cataŋrō, Lith. keturios, Ir. cetheoir/?

=== Reflexes of the numeral prefixes ===
Number	Reconstruction	Reflexes (with examples)
one- (together, same)	*sm̥-	Ved. sa-kŕ̥t "once", Gk. ᾰ̔πλόος haplóos "one-fold, simple", Lat. sim-plex "one-fold"
two-	*dwi-	Ved. dvi-pád- "two-footed", Gk. dí-pod- "two-footed", Archaic Lat. dui-dent "a sacrificial animal with two teeth", Lith. dvi-kojis "two-footed"
three-	*tri-	Ved. tri-pád- "three-footed", Gk. trí-pod- "three-footed (table)", Lat. tri-ped- "three-footed", Lith. tri-kojis "three-footed", Gaul. tri-garanus "having three cranes", Alb. tri-dhjetë "thirty" (three ten)
four-	*kʷ(e)tru-	Ved. cátuṣ-pád- "four-footed", Av. caθru-gaoša- "four-eared", Gk. tetrá-pod- "four-footed", Lat. quadru-ped- "four-footed", Lith. ketur-kojis "four-footed"

=== Reflexes of the ordinal numbers ===
Number	Reconstruction	Reflexes
first	*pr̥h₃-wó-	Ved. pūrviyá-, Lat. prīvus, OCS prĭvŭ, Pol. pierwszy, Russ. pervyj, Toch. parwät/parwe
first	*pr̥h₃-mó-	Goth. fruma, Lith. pìrmas, Latv. pirmais, Lat. prīmus, Osc. perum
first	other forms	Eng. fyrst/first, Hitt. para, Lyc. pri, Av. pairi, vienet-as, paoiriia, Osset. fyccag, farast/farast, Kamviri pürük, Gk. πρῶτος prôtos, Umbr. pert, ON fyrstr, Gm. furist/Fürst "prince, ruler"; fruo/früh "early", Ir. er/air, Welsh ar, OPruss. pariy, Alb. i parë
second	*(d)wi-teró-	Skr. dvitīya, Gk. δεύτερος deúteros, Russ. vtoroj
third	*tri-t(y)ó-	Ved. tr̥tīya-, Gk. τρίτος trítos, Lat. tertius, Alb. (i) tretë, Lith. trečias < *tretias, Russ. tretij
fourth	*kʷetwr̥-tó-	Gk. τέταρτος tétartos, Eng. feorþa/fourth, OCS četvrĭtŭ, Alb. (i) katërt, Lat. quārtus, Lith. ketvirtas, Russ. chetv'ortyj
fifth	*penkʷ-tó-	Av. puxδa-, Gk. πέμπτος pémptos, Lat. quīntus, Alb. (i) pestë, Lith. penktas, Russ. p'atyj
sixth	*sweḱs-tó-	Gk. ἕκτος héktos, Lat. sextus, Alb.(i) gjashtë, Lith. šeštas, Russ. šestoj
seventh	*septm̥-(m/t)ó-	Gk. ἕβδομος hébdomos, Lat. septimus, OCS sedmŭ, Lith. sẽkmas (then displaced by the neologism "septintas") Russ. sed'moj
eighth	*h₃eḱtōw-ó-s	Gk. ὄγδο(ϝ)ος ógdo(w)os, Lat. octāvus, Russ. vos'moj
eighth	*oḱtm-o-s?	Lith. ašmas (then displaced by the neologism "aštuntas")
ninth	*(h₁)newn̥-(n/t)ó-	Lat. nōnus, Gk. ἔνατος énatos, Pruss. newīnts; Russ. dev'atyj
tenth	*deḱm̥-(m/t)ó-	Ved. daśamá-, Av. dasəma-, Lat. decimus, Gk. δέκατος dékatos, Lith. dešimtas, Russ. desjatyj

== Bibliography ==
- Beekes, Robert S. P. (1995), Comparative Indo-European Linguistics: An Introduction, J. Benjamins Pub., ISBN 1-55619-505-2
- Brugmann, Karl (1892), Grundriß der vergleichenden Grammatik der indogermanischen Sprachen, vol. II/2
- Fortson, Benjamin W. IV (2004), Indo-European Language and Culture, Blackwell Publishing, ISBN 1-4051-0316-7
- Gvozdanovic, Jadranka (1991), Indo-European Numerals, Walter de Gruyter, ISBN 3-11-011322-8
- Lehmann, Winfried P. (1993), Theoretical Bases of Indo-European Linguistics, London: Routledge, ISBN 0-415-08201-3
- Meillet, Antoine, MSL XIV
- Sihler, Andrew L. (1995), New Comparative Grammar of Greek and Latin, Oxford University Press, ISBN 0-19-508345-8
