= Proto-Indo-European particles =

Grammatical particles

The particles of the Proto-Indo-European language (PIE) have been reconstructed by modern linguists based on similarities found across all Indo-European languages.

== Adverbs ==
=== Adverbs used as adpositions ===
Many particles could be used both as adverbs and postpositions. This is similar to modern languages; compare English He is above in the attic (adverb) and The bird is above the house (preposition). The postpositions became prepositions in the daughter languages except Anatolian, Indo-Iranian and Sabellic; some of the other branches such as Latin and Greek preserve postpositions vestigially.

Reflexes, or descendants of the PIE reconstructed forms in its daughter languages, include the following.

| Particle | Meaning | Reflexes |
|---|---|---|
| *h₂epo / h₂po / apo | from | Ved. ápa "away, forth", Gk. apó, Lat. ab "from", Alb. pa "without", Eng. of, off, Hitt. āppa, āppan "behind" |
| *h₂ed | to, by, at | Lat. ad, Osc. adpúd, Umb. ař, Goth. at, ON at, Eng. æt/at, Gm. az/--, Ir. ad/, Welsh add-, at, Gaul. ad, Phryg. addaket, XMK addai |
| *h₂eti | from, back, again | Lat. at, OCS отъ, Ir. aith-, Welsh ad- "re-", Toch. A atas, Toch. B ate "away", Gk. atar "however" |
| *h₂en / *h₂enh₃ / *h₂neh₃ | on, upon | Av. ana, Gk. ano, Lat. in (in some cases), ON á, Goth. ana, Eng. an/on, Gm. ?/an, Lith. ant |
| *h₂enti | against, at the end, in front of, before | Gk. anti, Lat. ante, Hitt. hantezzi "first" |
| *h₂eu | off, away, too much, very | Ved. ava, Lat. aut, autem, Lith. nuo |
| *h₂n̥-bʰi / *h₂m̥-bʰi | around (→ both) | Ved. abhi, Av. aiwito, aibi, Pers. abiy/?, Gk. amphi, ON um, Eng. bi/by; ymbi/umbe (obsolete), Gm. umbi/um; ?/bei, Lat. ambi, ambo, Gaul. ambi, Ir. imb/um, Welsh am, Toch. āmpi/?, Alb. mbi, Lith. abu, OCS oba, Russ. об/о "about", оба "both" |
| *bʰeǵʰ | without | OCS безъ, OPruss. bhe, Ved. bahis "from outwards" |
| *de, *do | to | Gk. -de, Eng. to, Gm. zu, Lith. da-, OCS до, PER tâ, Welsh i, Ir. do, Luw. anda, |
| *h₁eǵʰs | out | Lat. ex, Gk. ἐκ (ek)/ἐξ (eks), Gaul. ex-, Ir. ass/as; acht/; echtar, Russ. из (iz), Alb. jashtë, Oscan eh-, Umbrian ehe-, Lith. iš, Ltv. iz, OPruss. is, Welsh ech- |
| *h₁eǵʰs-tos | outside | Gk. ektos |
| *h₁eǵʰs-tro- / *h₁eǵʰs-ter | extra | Lat. extra, Welsh either "except, besides" |
| *h₁en | in | Gk. en, Lat. in, Eng. in/in, Gm. in/in, īn/ein-, Ir. i, Welsh yn, Arm. i, Alb. në, OPruss. en, OCS въ(н)-, Luw. anda, Carian nt_a, Goth. in, ON í, Ir. in/i, Lith. į, Ltv. iekšā |
| *h₁en-ter | within, inside | Ved. antár "between", Lat. inter "between, among", Gm. untar/unter "between, among" (see also *n̥dʰ-er below), Ir. eter/idir "between", Cornish ynter, Alb. ndër "between, in", Pers. ændær "inside", OCS вънѫтръ (vŭn-ǫtrŭ) "within, inside", SCr. unutar "within" |
| *h₁eti | beyond, over (about quantity), besides | Lat. et, etiam, Gk. ἔτι, οὐκέτι, Ved. अति (ati), Av. aiti, OPruss. et-, at-, Eng. ed-, edgrow, Gaul. eti, t-ic |
| *h₁opi / h₁epi | near, at, upon, by | Ved. ápi "by, on", Gk. epí "on", Lat. ob "on", Arm. ew "and", Av. aipi, Lith. api-, apie, Alb. afër "near" |
| *h₁neu | without | Khot. anau "without" Osset. aenae Gk. aneu |
| *h₁poi | away, thither | Hitt. pe- |
| *km̥-th₂ / *km̥-ti | by, along | Hitt. katta "with, down (+Gen)", Gaul. kanta "with", Gk. katá "down" Welsh gan |
| *kom | with | Lat. cum, Ir. co/?, Welsh cyf-, Goth. ga- |
| *medʰi | in the middle | Pers., miyan Av. madiiana, Khot. mayana-, Ved. madhyama Lat. medius OPruss. median Goth. miduma "the middle" OCS между, Welsh y mewn |
| *n̥dʰ-eri | under | Ved. adhás, Av. aδairi, Lat. īnfr-ā, Eng. under/under, Arm. ənd, Pers. ?/zēr, ON und, Goth. undar, Gm. untar/unter, Arm. ĕndhup/ĕnthub |
| *ni | down, under | Ved. ní, Eng. ne-ther, Arm. ni, OCS ни-зъ |
| *nu | now | Hitt. nu, Luw. nanun, Ved. nū, OPers. nūra/?, Pers. æknun/konun/?, Gk. nûn, Lat. nunc, ON nū, Goth. nu, Eng. nū/now, Gm. nu/nun, Toch. nuṃ/nano, Lith. nūn, Ltv. nu, OPruss. teinu, OCS нꙑнѣ (nyně), Alb. tani, Arb. naní (but see the list of conjunctions below) |
| *h₃ebʰi, h₃bʰi | towards, into, at | OCS объ |
| *per(i) | around, through | Ved. pári "around, forth", Gk. perí "around", Lat. per "through", OPruss. per, Alb. për, Russ. pere- "through, over" |
| *per / *pero / *prō | before, forth, in front of, ahead of | Hitt. pēran "before", prā "toward", Ved. prā, Lat. per, prō, Eng. for/fore-, Gm. ?/vor, Welsh rhy, rhag, er, Lith. per, pro, Alb. para, Pers. pær-/pæri-/par-, Russ. pered |
| *pos | after | Ved. pascat, Lat. post, Lith. paskui |
| *r̥ / *rō / *rō-dʰi | for (enclitic), for the purpose of | Ved. r̥ OCS ради |
| *trh₂os | through | Ved. tiras, Lat. trāns, Eng. through, OIr. tar, Welsh tra |
| *uper | above | Ved. upári, Gk. hupér, Lat. s-uper, Eng. over, Ir. for/fara, Welsh gor-, gwar- Arm. (i) ver "up", Alb. sipër, Gm. über |
| *up / *upo | under, below | Ved. úpa "up to", Gk. hupó "below", Lat. s-ub, Ir. fo/faoi, Welsh go-, gwa- Hitt. upzi, Av. upa, Pers. upa/?, Umb. sub, Osc. sup, ON upp, Goth. iup, Eng. upp/up, Gm. uf/auf, Welsh go, Gaul. voretus, Toch. ?/spe, Lith. po |

Untranslated reflexes have the same meaning as the PIE word.

In the following languages, two reflexes separated by a slash mean:

- English: Old English / Modern English
- German: Old High German / New High German
- Irish: Old Irish / Modern Irish
- Persian: Old Persian / Modern Persian
- Tocharian: Tocharian A / Tocharian B

=== Negating prefixes (privatives) ===
Two privatives can be reconstructed, *ne and *mē, the latter only used for negative commands. The privative prefix *n̥- is likely the zero grade of *ne.

| Particle | Meaning | Reflexes |
|---|---|---|
| *ne | sentence negator | Ved. ná, Lat. nē/ne-, Eng. ne/no, Gm. ne/nein, Lith. nè, OCS ne, Hitt. natta, Luw. ni-, Lyc. ni-, Lyd. ni-, Av. na, Pers. na/?, Gk. ne-, Osc. ne, Umb. an-, ON né, Goth. ni, Ir. ní/ní, Welsh ni, Arm. an-, Toch. an-/en-, Ltv. ne, OPruss. ne, Pol. nie, Russ. ne, net, Alb. nuk |
| *n̥- | privative prefix | Hitt. am-, Ved. a(n)-, Gk. a(n)-, Lat. in-, Alb. e-, Eng. un-, Gm. un- |
| *meh₁ | negator for commands | Ved. mā, Per ma-, Gk. mē (Doric mā) Alb. mo, Alb. mos, Arm. mi |

=== Adverbs derived from adjectives ===
Adverbs derived from adjectives (like English bold-ly, beautiful-ly) arguably cannot be classified as particles. In Proto-Indo-European, these are simply case forms of adjectives and thus better classified as nouns. An example is *meǵh₂ "greatly", a nominative-accusative singular.

== Conjunctions ==
The following conjunctions can be reconstructed:

| Particle | Meaning | Reflexes |
|---|---|---|
| *kʷe | and, word or phrase connector^{†} | Hitt. -ku, Ved. ca, Av. ca, Gk. te, Lat. -que, Celtib. kue, Per ke |
| *wē | or, word or phrase disjunctor^{†} | Ved. vā, Gk. -(w)ē, Lat. -ve |
| *de | and, sentence connector | Gk. dé, Alb. dhe, Russ. da "and" |
| *nu | and, sentence connector | Hitt. nu, Ved. nú, Gk. nu, Toch. ?/nu, Ir. no-/?, OCS нъ (nŭ) (but see the adverbs above) |

^{†}Placed after the joined word, as in Latin Senatus populus-que Romanus ("Senate and people of Rome"), -que joining senatus and populus.

== Interjections ==
There is only one PIE interjection that can be securely reconstructed; the second is uncertain.

| Particle | Meaning | Reflexes |
|---|---|---|
| *wai! | expression of woe or agony | Hitt. uwai, Lat. vae, Welsh gwae, Breton gwa, Eng. woe, ON. vei, Pers. vai, Kurd. wai, Ved. uvē, Gk. aī, aī aī (woe!, alas!), Lith. vajé, Ltv. ai, vai, Arm. vai |
| *ō! / *eh₃! (?) | oh! | Gk. ō, Lat. ō, Eng. oh!, Gm. oh!, Russ. o!, Pers. e!, |
