= Proto-Indo-European language =

Ancestor of the Indo-European languages

Proto-Indo-European
- PIE
- Reconstruction of: Indo-European languages
- Region: Proto-Indo-European homeland, most likely on the Pontic–Caspian steppe
- Era: c. 4500 – c. 2500 BCE
- Lower-order reconstructions: Proto-Albanian; Proto-Anatolian; Proto-Armenian; Proto-Balto-Slavic; Proto-Celtic; Proto-Germanic; Proto-Greek; Proto-Indo-Iranian; Proto-Italic; Proto-Tocharian

Proto-Indo-European (PIE) is the reconstructed common ancestor of the Indo-European language family. No direct record of Proto-Indo-European has been discovered; its proposed features have been derived by linguistic reconstruction from documented Indo-European languages. Far more work has gone into reconstructing PIE than any other proto-language. The majority of linguistic work during the 19th century was devoted to the reconstruction of PIE and its daughter languages, and many of the modern techniques of linguistic reconstruction (such as the comparative method) were developed as a result.

PIE is hypothesized to have been spoken as a single language from approximately 4500 BCE to 2500 BCE during the Late Neolithic to Early Bronze Age, though other estimates place the bounds of the period as much as more than a thousand years later. According to the prevailing Kurgan hypothesis, the original homeland of the Proto-Indo-Europeans may have been in the Pontic–Caspian steppe of eastern Europe and central Asia. The linguistic reconstruction of PIE has provided insight into the pastoral culture and patriarchal religion of its speakers. Recent studies of archaeogenetics (the study of ancient DNA) add to the evidence that these were not just isolated tribal movements but broad networks of both pastoral expansion and trade where the language spoken was a key marker of identity for the tribes involved. As speakers of Proto-Indo-European became isolated from each other through the Indo-European migrations, the regional dialects of Proto-Indo-European spoken by the various groups diverged, as each dialect underwent shifts in pronunciation, morphology, and vocabulary. Over many centuries, these dialects transformed into the known ancient Indo-European languages. From there, more linguistic divergence led to the evolution of their current descendants, the modern Indo-European languages.

PIE is believed to have had an elaborate system of morphology that included inflectional suffixes (analogous to English child, child's, children, children's) as well as ablaut (vowel alterations, as preserved in English sing, sang, sung, song) and accent. PIE nominals and pronouns had a complex system of declension, and verbs similarly had a complex system of conjugation. The PIE phonology, particles, numerals, and copula are also well-reconstructed. Asterisks are used by linguists as a conventional mark of reconstructed words, such as *wódr̥, *ḱwn̥tós, or *tréyes; these forms are the reconstructed ancestors of the modern English words water, hound, and three, respectively.

== Development of the hypothesis ==
No direct evidence of the Proto-Indo-European language exists; scholars have reconstructed PIE from its present-day descendants using the comparative method. For example, compare the pairs of words in Italian and English: piede and foot, padre and father, pesce and fish. Since there is a consistent correspondence of the initial consonants (p and f) that emerges far too frequently to be unrelated coincidence, one can infer that these languages stem from a common parent language. Detailed analysis suggests a system of sound laws to describe the phonetic and phonological changes from the hypothetical ancestral words to the modern ones. These laws have become so detailed and reliable as to support the Neogrammarian hypothesis: the Indo-European sound laws apply without exception.

William Jones, an Anglo-Welsh philologist and puisne judge in Bengal during early East India Company rule in India, caused an academic sensation when in 1786 he postulated the common ancestry of Sanskrit, Greek, Latin, Gothic, the Celtic languages, and Old Persian, but he was not the first to state such a hypothesis. In the 16th century, European visitors to the Indian subcontinent became aware of similarities between Indo-Iranian languages and European languages, and as early as 1653, Marcus Zuerius van Boxhorn had published a proposal for a proto-language ("Scythian") for the following language families: Germanic, Romance, Greek, Baltic, Slavic, Celtic, and Iranian. In a memoir sent to the Académie des Inscriptions et Belles-Lettres in 1767, Gaston-Laurent Coeurdoux, a French Jesuit who spent most of his life in India, had specifically demonstrated the analogy between Sanskrit and European languages. According to current academic consensus, Jones's famous work of 1786 was less accurate than his predecessors', as he erroneously included Egyptian, Japanese and Chinese in the Indo-European languages, while omitting Hindi.

In 1818, Danish linguist Rasmus Christian Rask elaborated the set of correspondences in his prize essay Undersøgelse om det gamle Nordiske eller Islandske Sprogs Oprindelse ('Investigation of the Origin of the Old Norse or Icelandic Language'), where he argued that Old Norse was related to the Germanic languages, and even suggested a relation to the Baltic, Slavic, Greek, Latin and Romance languages. In 1816, Franz Bopp published On the System of Conjugation in Sanskrit, in which he investigated the common origin of Sanskrit, Persian, Greek, Latin, and German. In 1833, he began publishing the Comparative Grammar of Sanskrit, Zend, Greek, Latin, Lithuanian, Old Slavic, Gothic, and German.

In 1822, Jacob Grimm formulated what became known as Grimm's law as a general rule in his Deutsche Grammatik. Grimm showed correlations between the Germanic and other Indo-European languages and demonstrated that sound change systematically transforms all words of a language. From the 1870s, the Neogrammarians proposed that sound laws have no exceptions, as illustrated by Verner's law, published in 1876, which resolved apparent exceptions to Grimm's law by exploring the role of accent (stress) in language change.

August Schleicher's A Compendium of the Comparative Grammar of the Indo-European, Sanskrit, Greek and Latin Languages (1874–77) represented an early attempt to reconstruct the Proto-Indo-European language.

By the early 1900s, Indo-Europeanists had developed well-defined descriptions of PIE which scholars still accept today. Later, the discovery of the Anatolian and Tocharian languages added to the corpus of descendant languages. A subtle new principle won wide acceptance: the laryngeal theory, which explained irregularities in the reconstruction of Proto-Indo-European phonology as the effects of hypothetical sounds which no longer exist in all languages documented prior to the excavation of cuneiform tablets in Anatolian. This theory was first proposed by Ferdinand de Saussure in 1879 on the basis of internal reconstruction only, and progressively won general acceptance after Jerzy Kuryłowicz's discovery of consonantal reflexes of these reconstructed sounds in Hittite.

Julius Pokorny's Indogermanisches etymologisches Wörterbuch ('Indo-European Etymological Dictionary', 1959) gave a detailed, though conservative, overview of the lexical knowledge accumulated by 1959. Jerzy Kuryłowicz's 1956 Apophonie gave a better understanding of Indo-European ablaut. From the 1960s, knowledge of Anatolian became robust enough to establish its relationship to PIE.

In The Oxford Introduction to Proto-Indo-European and the Proto-Indo-European World, Mallory and Adams illustrate the resemblance with the following examples of cognate forms (with the addition of Old English for further comparison):

Examples of cognate words in Indo-European languages
PIE	Modern English	Old English	Latin	Greek	Sanskrit
*méh₂tēr	mother	mōdor	māter	mḗtēr	mātár-
*ph₂tḗr	father	fæder	pater	patḗr	pitár-
*bʰréh₂tēr	brother	brōþor	frāter	phrḗtēr	bhrā́tar-
*swésōr	sister	sweostor	soror	éor	svásar-
*suHnús, *suHyús	son	sunu	—	huiús	sūnú-
*dʰugh₂tḗr	daughter	dohtor	—	thugátēr	duhitár-
*gʷṓus	cow	cū	bōs	boûs	gáu-

== Historical and geographical setting ==
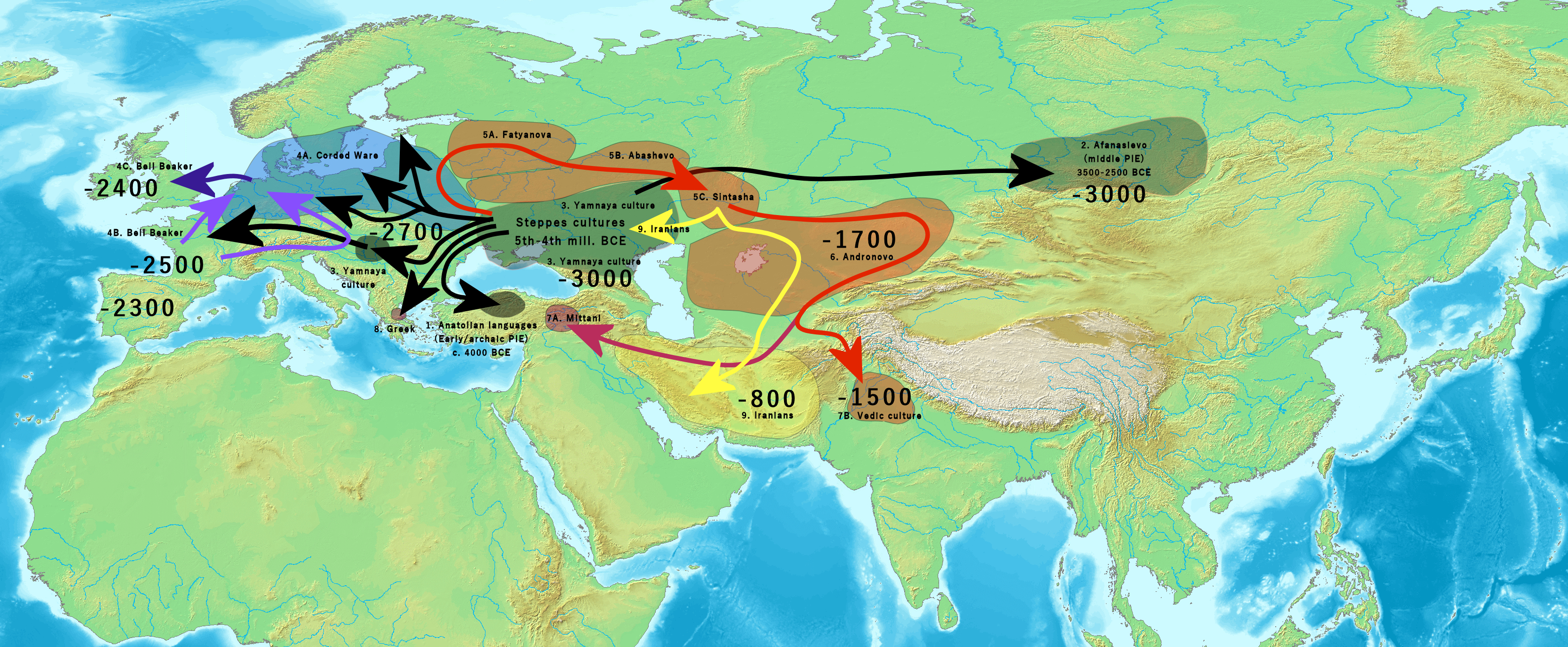
Early Indo-European migrations from the Pontic steppes and across Central Asia according to the widely held Kurgan hypothesis

Scholars have proposed multiple hypotheses about when, where, and by whom PIE was spoken. The Kurgan hypothesis, first put forward in 1956 by Marija Gimbutas, has become the most popular. It proposes that this proto-language was spoken by the Yamnaya culture in the general area of the Pontic steppe north of the Black Sea c. 3400 BCE. (Note: See: Bomhard: "This scenario is supported not only by linguistic evidence, but also by a growing body of archeological and genetic evidence. The Indo-Europeans have been identified with several cultural complexes existing in that area between 4,500—3,500 BCE. The literature supporting such a homeland is both extensive and persuasive [...]. Consequently, other scenarios regarding the possible Indo-European homeland, such as Anatolia, have now been mostly abandoned."; Anthony & Ringe: "Archaeological evidence and linguistic evidence converge in support of an origin of Indo-European languages on the Pontic-Caspian steppes around 4,000 years BCE. The evidence is so strong that arguments in support of other hypotheses should be reexamined."; Mallory: "The Kurgan solution is attractive and has been accepted by many archaeologists and linguists, in part or total. It is the solution one encounters in the Encyclopædia Britannica and the Grand Dictionnaire Encyclopédique Larousse."; Strazny: "The single most popular proposal is the Pontic steppes (see the Kurgan hypothesis)..." It proposes that the original speakers of PIE were the Yamnaya culture associated with the kurgans (burial mounds) on the Pontic–Caspian steppe north of the Black Sea. According to the theory, they were nomadic pastoralists who domesticated the horse, which allowed them to migrate across Europe and Asia in wagons and chariots. By the early 3rd millennium BCE, they had expanded throughout the Pontic–Caspian steppe and into eastern Europe. In 2024, a pair of studies led by Harvard biologist David Reich argued that the original speakers of PIE originated in the Caucusus-Lower Volga region during the Eneolithic Period.)

Other theories include the Anatolian hypothesis, which posits that PIE spread out from Anatolia with agriculture beginning c. 7500–6000 BCE, the Armenian hypothesis, the Paleolithic continuity paradigm, and the indigenous Aryans theory. The last two of these theories are not regarded as credible within academia. Out of all the theories for a PIE homeland, the Kurgan and Anatolian hypotheses are the ones most widely accepted, and also the ones most debated against each other. Following the publication of several studies on ancient DNA in 2015, Colin Renfrew, the original author and proponent of the Anatolian hypothesis, has accepted the reality of migrations of populations speaking one or several Indo-European languages from the Pontic steppe towards Northwestern Europe.

Classification of Indo-European languages. Red: Extinct languages. White: categories or unattested proto-languages. Left half: centum languages; right half: satem languages

== Descendants ==
The antiquity of the earliest attestation (in units of 500 years) of each Indo-European group is: 2000–1500 BCE for Anatolian; 1500–1000 BCE for Indo-Aryan and Greek; 1000–500 BCE for Iranic, Celtic, Italic, Phrygian, Illyric, Messapic, South Picene, and Venetic; 500–1 BCE for Thracian and Ancient Macedonian; 1–500 CE for Germanic, Armenian, Lusitanian, and Tocharian; 500–1000 CE for Slavic; 1500–2000 CE for Albanian and Baltic.

The table lists the main Indo-European language families, comprising the languages descended from Proto-Indo-European.

Clade	Proto-language	Description	Historical languages	Modern descendants
Anatolian	Proto-Anatolian	All now extinct, the best attested being the Hittite language.	Hittite, Luwian, Palaic, Lycian, Lydian, Carian, Pisidian, Sidetic, Milyan	There are no living descendants of Proto-Anatolian.
Tocharian	Proto-Tocharian	An extinct branch known from manuscripts dating from the 6th to the 8th century CE and found in northwest China.	Tocharian A, Tocharian B	There are no living descendants of Proto-Tocharian.
Italic	Proto-Italic	This included many languages, but only descendants of Latin (the Romance languages) survive.	Latin, Faliscan, Umbrian, Oscan, African Romance, Dalmatian, Volscian, Marsi, Pre-Samnite, Paeligni, Sabine	Portuguese, Galician, Spanish, Ladino, Catalan, Occitan, French, Italian, Friulian, Romansh, Romanian, Aromanian, Sardinian, Corsican, Venetian, Latin (as a liturgical language of the Catholic Church), Picard, Mirandese, Aragonese, Walloon, Piedmontese, Lombard, Neapolitan, Sicilian, Emilian-Romagnol, Ligurian, Ladin
Celtic	Proto-Celtic	Once spoken across Europe and Anatolia (Asia Minor), but now mostly confined to Europe's northwestern edge.	Gaulish, Lepontic, Noric, Pictish, Cumbric, Old Irish, Middle Welsh, Gallaecian, Galatian, Celtiberian	Irish, Scottish Gaelic, Welsh, Breton, Cornish, Manx
Germanic	Proto-Germanic	Branched into three subfamilies: West Germanic, East Germanic (now extinct), and North Germanic.	Old English, Old Norse, Gothic, Old High German, Old Saxon, Vandalic, Burgundian, Crimean Gothic, Norn, Greenlandic Norse	English, German, Afrikaans, Dutch, Yiddish, Norwegian, Danish, Swedish, Frisian, Icelandic, Faroese, Luxembourgish, Scots, Limburgish, Wymysorys, Elfdalian
Balto-Slavic	Proto-Balto-Slavic	Branched into the Baltic languages and the Slavic languages.	Old Prussian, Old Church Slavonic, Sudovian, Semigallian, Selonian, Skalvian, Galindian, Polabian, Knaanic	Baltic: Latvian, Latgalian and Lithuanian; Slavic: Russian, Ukrainian, Belarusian, Polish, Czech, Slovak, Sorbian, Serbo-Croatian, Bulgarian, Slovenian, Macedonian, Kashubian, Rusyn
Indo-Iranian	Proto-Indo-Iranian	Branched into the Indo-Aryan, Iranian and Nuristani languages.	Vedic Sanskrit, Pali, Prakrit languages; Old Persian, Parthian, Old Azeri, Median, Elu, Sogdian, Saka, Avestan, Bactrian	Indo-Aryan: Hindustani (Hindi and Urdu), Marathi, Sylheti, Bengali, Assamese, Odia, Konkani, Gujarati, Nepali, Dogri, Romani, Sindhi, Maithili, Sinhala, Dhivehi, Punjabi, Kashmiri, Sanskrit (revived); Iranian: Persian, Pashto, Pamiri, Balochi, Kurdish, Zaza, Ossetian, Luri, Talyshi, Tati, Gilaki, Mazandarani, Semnani, Yaghnobi; Nuristani: Katë, Prasun, Ashkun, Nuristani Kalasha, Tregami, Zemiaki
Armenian	Proto-Armenian	Armenian is the only surviving representative of the Armenian branch of the Indo-European language family.	Classical Armenian	Armenian (Eastern and Western)
Hellenic	Proto-Greek	Modern Greek and Tsakonian are the only surviving varieties of Greek.	Ancient Greek, Ancient Macedonian	Greek, Tsakonian
Albanian	Proto-Albanian	Albanian is the only surviving representative of the Albanoid branch of the Indo-European language family.	Illyrian (disputed); Daco-Thracian (disputed)	Albanian (Gheg and Tosk)

Commonly proposed subgroups of Indo-European languages include Italo-Celtic, Graeco-Aryan, Graeco-Armenian, Graeco-Phrygian, Daco-Thracian, and Thraco-Illyrian.

There are numerous lexical similarities between the Proto-Indo-European and Proto-Kartvelian languages due to early language contact, as well as some morphological similarities—notably the Indo-European ablaut, which is remarkably similar to the root ablaut system reconstructible for Proto-Kartvelian.

=== Marginally attested languages ===
The Lusitanian language was a marginally attested language spoken in areas near the border between present-day Portugal and Spain. The Venetic and Liburnian languages known from the North Adriatic region are sometimes classified as Italic.

Albanian and Greek are the only surviving Indo-European descendants of a Paleo-Balkan language area, named for their occurrence in or in the vicinity of the Balkan Peninsula. Most of the other languages of this area—including Illyrian, Thracian, and Dacian—do not appear to be members of any other subfamilies of PIE, but are so poorly attested that proper classification of them is not possible. Forming an exception, Phrygian is sufficiently well-attested to allow proposals of a particularly close affiliation with Greek, and a Graeco-Phrygian branch of Indo-European is becoming increasingly accepted.

== Phonology ==
Proto-Indo-European phonology has been reconstructed in some detail. Notable features of the most widely accepted (but not uncontroversial) reconstruction include:

- three series of stop consonants reconstructed as voiceless, voiced, and breathy voiced;
- sonorant consonants that could be used syllabically;
- three so-called laryngeal consonants, whose exact pronunciation is not well-established but which are believed to have existed in part based on their detectable effects on adjacent sounds;
- the fricative /s/
- a vowel system in which /e/ and /o/ were the most frequently occurring vowels. The existence of /a/ as a separate phoneme is debated.

=== Notation ===
==== Vowels ====
The vowels in commonly used notation are:

	Front		Central		Back	
	short	long	short	long	short	long
Mid	*e /e/	*ē /eː/			*o /o/	*ō /oː/
Open			(*a /a/)	(*ā /aː/)		

==== Consonants ====
The corresponding consonants in commonly used notation are:

		Labial	Coronal	Dorsal			Laryngeal			
		Labial	Coronal	palatalised	plain	labialised	velar or uvular		glottal	
Nasals		*m /m/	*n /n/		*n [ŋ]					
Stops	voiceless	*p /p/	*t /t/	*ḱ /kʲ/	*k /k/	*kʷ /kʷ/				
Stops	voiced	(*b /b/)	*d /d/	*ǵ /gʲ/	*g /ɡ/	*gʷ /ɡʷ/				
Stops	aspirated	*bʰ /bʱ/	*dʰ /dʱ/	*ǵʰ /gʲʱ/	*gʰ /ɡʱ/	*gʷʰ /ɡʷʱ/				
Fricatives			*s /s/, [z]				*h₃ /ɣʷ/~/qʷː/	*h₂ /x/~/qː/	*h₁ /h/~/ʔ/	Laryngeal Pronunciation (J. E. Rasmussen, Kloekhorst)
Fricatives			*s /s/, [z]				[ɵ]	[ɐ]	[ə]	Syllabic allophone
Liquids	Trill		*r /r/							
Liquids	Lateral		*l /l/							
Semivowels				*y /j/		*w /w/				
Semivowels				*i [i]		*u [u]				Syllabic allophone

All sonorants (i.e. nasals, liquids and semivowels) can appear in syllabic position (commonly indicated by an underring for nasals and liquids). The syllabic allophones of *y and *w are realized as the surface vowels *i and *u respectively.

[z] is an allophone of *s when next to a voiced consonant in certain positions.

[ŋ] is an allophone of *n before velar consonants.

=== Accent ===
The Proto-Indo-European accent is reconstructed today as having had variable lexical stress, which could appear on any syllable and whose position often varied among different members of a paradigm (e.g. between singular and plural of a verbal paradigm). Stressed syllables received a higher pitch and it is often said that PIE had a pitch accent. The location of the stress is associated with ablaut variations, especially between full-grade vowels (/e/ and /o/) and zero-grade (i.e. lack of a vowel), but not entirely predictable from it.

The accent is best preserved in Vedic Sanskrit and (in the case of nouns) Ancient Greek, and indirectly attested in a number of phenomena in other IE languages, such as Verner's Law in the Germanic branch. Sources for Indo-European accentuation are also the Balto-Slavic accentual system and plene spelling in Hittite cuneiform. To account for mismatches between the accent of Vedic Sanskrit and Ancient Greek, as well as a few other phenomena, a few historical linguists prefer to reconstruct PIE as a tone language where each morpheme had an inherent tone; the sequence of tones in a word then evolved, according to that hypothesis, into the placement of lexical stress in different ways in different IE branches.

== Morphology ==
Proto-Indo-European, like its earliest attested descendants, was a highly inflected, fusional language. Suffixation and ablaut were the main methods of marking inflection, both for nominals and verbs. The subject of a sentence was in the nominative case and agreed in number and person with the verb, which was additionally marked for voice, tense, aspect, and mood.

=== Root ===
Proto-Indo-European nominals and verbs were primarily composed of roots – affix-lacking morphemes that carried the core lexical meaning of a word. They were used to derive related words (cf. the English root "-friend-", from which are derived related words such as friendship, friendly, befriend, and newly coined words such as unfriend). As a rule, roots were monosyllabic, and had the structure (s)(C)CVC(C), where the symbols C stand for consonants, V stands for a variable vowel, and optional components are in parentheses. All roots ended in a consonant and, although less certain, they appear to have started with a consonant as well.

A root plus a suffix formed a word stem, and a word stem plus an inflectional ending formed a word. Proto-Indo-European was a fusional language, in which inflectional morphemes signaled the grammatical relationships between words. This dependence on inflectional morphemes means that roots in PIE, unlike those in English, were rarely used without affixes.

=== Ablaut ===
Many morphemes in Proto-Indo-European had short e as their inherent vowel; the Indo-European ablaut is the change of this short e to short o, long e (ē), long o (ō), or no vowel. The forms are referred to as the "ablaut grades" of the morpheme—the e-grade, o-grade, zero-grade (no vowel), etc. This variation in vowels occurred both within inflectional morphology (e.g., different grammatical forms of a noun or verb may have different vowels) and derivational morphology (e.g., a verb and an associated abstract verbal noun may have different vowels).

Categories that PIE distinguished through ablaut were often also identifiable by contrasting endings, but the loss of these endings in some later Indo-European languages has led them to use ablaut alone to identify grammatical categories, as in the Modern English words sing, sang, sung.

=== Noun ===
Proto-Indo-European nouns were probably declined for eight or nine cases:

- nominative: marks the subject of a verb. Words that follow a linking verb (copulative verb) and restate the subject of that verb also use the nominative case. The nominative is the dictionary form of the noun.
- accusative: used for the direct object of a transitive verb.
- genitive: marks a noun as modifying another noun.
- dative: used to indicate the indirect object of a transitive verb, such as Jacob in Maria gave Jacob a drink.
- instrumental: marks the instrument or means by, or with, which the subject achieves or accomplishes an action. It may be either a physical object or an abstract concept.
- ablative: used to express motion away from something.
- locative: expresses location, corresponding vaguely to the English prepositions in, on, at, and by.
- vocative: used for a word that identifies an addressee. A vocative is a noun of address where the identity of the party spoken to is set forth expressly within a sentence. For example, in the sentence, "I don't know, John", John is a noun of address, indicating the party being addressed.
- allative: used as a type of locative case that expresses movement towards something. It was preserved in Anatolian (particularly Old Hittite), and fossilized traces of it have been found in Greek. It is also present in Tocharian. Its PIE shape is uncertain, with candidates including *-h₂(e), *-(e)h₂, or *-a.

Late Proto-Indo-European had three grammatical genders:

- masculine
- feminine
- neuter

This system is probably derived from an older two-gender system, attested in Anatolian languages: common (or animate) and neuter (or inanimate) gender. The feminine gender only arose in the later period of the language. Neuter nouns collapsed the nominative, vocative and accusative into a single form, the plural of which used a special collective suffix *-h₂ (manifested in most descendants as -a). This same collective suffix in extended forms *-eh₂ and *-ih₂ (respectively on thematic and athematic nouns, becoming -ā and -ī in the early daughter languages) became used to form feminine nouns from masculines.

All nominals distinguished three numbers:

- singular
- dual
- plural

These numbers were also distinguished in verbs (see below), requiring agreement with their subject nominal.

=== Pronoun ===
Proto-Indo-European pronouns are difficult to reconstruct, owing to their variety in later languages. PIE had personal pronouns in the first and second grammatical person, but not the third person, where demonstrative pronouns were used instead. The personal pronouns had their own unique forms and endings, and some had two distinct stems; this is most obvious in the first person singular where the two stems are still preserved in English I and me. There were also two varieties for the accusative, genitive and dative cases, a stressed and an enclitic form.

Personal pronouns
Case	First person		Second person	
Case	Singular	Plural	Singular	Plural
Nominative	*h₁eǵ(oH/Hom)	*wei	*tuH	*yuH
Accusative	*h₁mé, *h₁me	*n̥smé, *nōs	*twé	*usmé, *wōs
Genitive	*h₁méne, *h₁moi	*n̥s(er)o-, *nos	*tewe, *toi	*yus(er)o-, *wos
Dative	*h₁méǵʰio, *h₁moi	*n̥smei, *n̥s	*tébʰio, *toi	*usmei
Instrumental	*h₁moí	*n̥smoí	*toí	*usmoí
Ablative	*h₁med	*n̥smed	*tued	*usmed
Locative	*h₁moí	*n̥smi	*toí	*usmi

=== Verb ===
Proto-Indo-European verbs, like the nouns, exhibited an ablaut system.

The most basic categorisation for the reconstructed Indo-European verb is grammatical aspect. Verbs are classed as:

- stative: verbs that depict a state of being
- imperfective: verbs depicting ongoing, habitual or repeated action
- perfective: verbs depicting a completed action or actions viewed as an entire process.

Verbs have at least four grammatical moods:

- indicative: indicates that something is a statement of fact; in other words, to express what the speaker considers to be a known state of affairs, as in declarative sentences.
- imperative: forms commands or requests, including the giving of prohibition or permission, or any other kind of advice or exhortation.
- subjunctive: used to express various states of unreality such as wish, emotion, possibility, judgment, opinion, obligation, or action that has not yet occurred
- optative: indicates a wish or hope. It is similar to the cohortative mood and is closely related to the subjunctive mood.

Verbs had two grammatical voices:

- active: used in a clause whose subject expresses the main verb's agent.
- mediopassive: for the middle voice and the passive voice.

Verbs had three grammatical persons: first, second and third.

Verbs had three grammatical numbers:

- singular
- dual: referring to precisely two of the entities (objects or persons) identified by the noun or pronoun.
- plural: a number other than singular or dual.

Verbs were probably marked by a highly developed system of participles, one for each combination of tense and voice, and an assorted array of verbal nouns and adjectival formations.

The following table shows a possible reconstruction of the PIE verb endings from Sihler, which largely represents the current consensus among Indo-Europeanists.

Person		Sihler (1995)	
Person		Athematic	Thematic
Singular	1st	*-mi	*-oh₂
Singular	2nd	*-si	*-esi
Singular	3rd	*-ti	*-eti
Dual	1st	*-wos	*-owos
Dual	2nd	*-th₁es	*-eth₁es
Dual	3rd	*-tes	*-etes
Plural	1st	*-mos	*-omos
Plural	2nd	*-te	*-ete
Plural	3rd	*-nti	*-onti

=== Numbers ===
Proto-Indo-European numerals are generally reconstructed as follows:

Number	Sihler
one	*(H)óynos/*(H)óywos/*(H)óyk(ʷ)os; *sḗm (full grade), *sm̥- (zero grade)
two	*d(u)wóh₁ (full grade), *dwi- (zero grade)
three	*tréyes (full grade), *tri- (zero grade)
four	*kʷetwóres (o-grade), *kʷ(e)twr̥- (zero grade) (see also the *kʷetwóres rule)
five	*pénkʷe
six	*s(w)éḱs; originally perhaps *wéḱs, with *s- under the influence of *septḿ̥
seven	*septḿ̥
eight	*oḱtṓ(w) or *h₃eḱtṓ(w)
nine	*h₁néwn̥
ten	*déḱm̥(t)

Rather than specifically 100, *ḱm̥tóm may originally have meant "a large number".

=== Particle ===
Proto-Indo-European particles were probably used both as adverbs and as postpositions. These postpositions became prepositions in most daughter languages.

Reconstructed particles include for example, *upo "under, below"; the negators *ne, *mē; the conjunctions *kʷe "and", *wē "or" and others; and an interjection, *wai!, expressing woe or agony.

=== Derivational morphology ===
Proto-Indo-European employed various means of deriving words from other words, or directly from verb roots.

==== Internal derivation ====
Internal derivation was a process that derived new words through changes in accent and ablaut alone. It was not as productive as external (affixing) derivation, but is firmly established by the evidence of various later languages.

===== Possessive adjectives =====
Possessive or associated adjectives were probably created from nouns through internal derivation. Such words could be used directly as adjectives, or they could be turned back into a noun without any change in morphology, indicating someone or something characterised by the adjective. They were probably also used as the second elements in compounds. If the first element was a noun, this created an adjective that resembled a present participle in meaning, e.g. "having much rice" or "cutting trees". When turned back into nouns, such compounds were Bahuvrihis or semantically resembled agent nouns.

In thematic stems, creating a possessive adjective seems to have involved shifting the accent one syllable to the right, for example:

- *tómh₁-o-s "slice" (Ancient Greek τόμος tómos) > *tomh₁-ó-s "cutting" (i.e. "making slices"; Greek τομός tomós) > *dr-u-tomh₁-ó-s "cutting trees" (Greek δρυτόμος drutómos "woodcutter" with irregular accent).
- *wólh₁-o-s "wish" (Vedic Sanskrit वर॑ vára) > *wolh₁-ó-s "having wishes" (Sanskrit व॒र vará "suitor").

In athematic stems, there was a change in the accent/ablaut class. The reconstructed four classes followed an ordering in which a derivation would shift the class one to the right:

acrostatic → proterokinetic → hysterokinetic → amphikinetic

The reason for this particular ordering of the classes in derivation is not known. Some examples:

- Acrostatic *krót-u-s ~ *krét-u-s "strength" (Sanskrit क्रतु॑ krátu) > proterokinetic *krét-u-s ~ *kr̥t-éw-s "having strength, strong" (Greek κρατύς kratús).
- Hysterokinetic *ph₂-tḗr ~ *ph₂-tr-és "father" (Greek πατήρ patḗr) > amphikinetic *h₁su-péh₂-tōr ~ *h₁su-ph₂-tr-és "having a good father" (Greek εὐπάτωρ eupátōr).

===== Vṛddhi =====
A vṛddhi derivation, named after the Sanskrit grammatical term, signifying "of, belonging to, descended from". It was characterised by "upgrading" the root grade, from zero to full (e) or from full to lengthened (ē). When upgrading from zero to full grade, the vowel could sometimes be inserted in an unexpected location, creating a different stem from the original full grade.

Examples:

- full grade *swéḱuro-s "father-in-law" (Vedic Sanskrit श्वशु॑र śváśura-) > lengthened grade *swēḱuró-s "relating to one's father-in-law" (Sanskrit श्वाशुर śvāśura, Old High German swāgur "brother-in-law").
- full grade *dyḗw-s > zero grade *diw-és "sky" (Sanskrit द्यौस् dyáus) > new full grade *deyw-o-s "god, sky god" (Sanskrit दे॒वस् devás, Ancient Greek Ζεύς Zeús, Latin deus, etc.). Note the difference in vowel placement, *dyew- in the full-grade stem of the original noun, but *deyw- in the vṛddhi derivative.

===== Nominalization =====
Adjectives with accent on the thematic vowel could be turned into nouns by moving the accent back onto the root. A zero grade root could remain so, or be "upgraded" to full grade like in a vṛddhi derivative. Some examples:

- PIE *ǵn̥h₁-tó-s "born" (Vedic Sanskrit जा॒त jātá) > *ǵénh₁-to- "child", literally "thing that is born"; Sanskrit जात jāta; German Kind).
- Ancient Greek λευκός leukós "white" > λεῦκος leûkos 'a kind of fish', literally "white one".
- Sanskrit कृ॒ष्ण kṛṣṇá 'dark' > कृष्ण॑स् kṛ́ṣṇas 'antelope' (literally "dark one").

This kind of derivation is likely related to the possessive adjectives, and can be seen as essentially the reverse of it.

=== Alternative morphological reconstructions ===
Roland A. Pooth has proposed an alternative, markedly different reconstruction of Proto-Indo-European morphology known as the "templatic model". In this analysis, PIE roots are interpreted as consonantal roots onto which transfixes (vowel melody templates) are superimposed (essentially replacing the ablaut of the standard reconstruction). Furthermore, the model proposes that PIE possessed a direct-inverse alignment, with verbal morphology distinguishing direct, inverse, and intransitive (or undirected) forms according to the direction of transitivity between participants.

Pooth also applied his model to a full reconstruction of "The North Wind and the Sun" in Proto-Indo-European.

== Syntax ==
The syntax of the older Indo-European languages has been studied in earnest since at least the late nineteenth century, by such scholars as Hermann Hirt and Berthold Delbrück. In the second half of the twentieth century, interest in the topic increased and led to reconstructions of Proto-Indo-European syntax.

Since all the early attested IE languages were inflectional, PIE is thought to have relied primarily on morphological markers, rather than word order, to signal syntactic relationships within sentences. Still, a default (unmarked) word order is thought to have existed in PIE. In 1892, Jacob Wackernagel reconstructed PIE's word order as subject–verb–object (SVO), based on evidence in Vedic Sanskrit.

Winfred P. Lehmann (1974), on the other hand, reconstructs PIE as a subject–object–verb (SOV) language. He posits that the presence of person marking in PIE verbs motivated a shift from OV to VO order in later dialects. Many of the descendant languages have VO order: modern Greek, Romance and Albanian prefer SVO, Insular Celtic has VSO as the default order, and even the Anatolian languages show some signs of this word order shift. Tocharian and Indo-Iranian, meanwhile, retained the conservative OV order. Lehmann attributes the context-dependent order preferences in Baltic, Slavic and Germanic to outside influences. Donald Ringe (2006), however, attributes these to internal developments instead.

Paul Friedrich (1975) disagrees with Lehmann's analysis. He reconstructs PIE with the following syntax:

- basic SVO word order
- adjectives before nouns
- head nouns before genitives
- prepositions rather than postpositions
- no dominant order in comparative constructions
- main clauses before relative clauses

Friedrich notes that even among those Indo-European languages with basic OV word order, none of them are rigidly OV. He also notes that these non-rigid OV languages mainly occur in parts of the IE area that overlap with OV languages from other families (such as Uralic and Dravidian), whereas VO is predominant in the central parts of the IE area. For these reasons, among others, he argues for a VO common ancestor.

Hans Henrich Hock (2015) reports that the SVO hypothesis still has some adherents, but the "broad consensus" among PIE scholars is that PIE would have been an SOV language. The SOV default word order with other orders used to express emphasis (e.g., verb–subject–object to emphasise the verb) is attested in Old Indo-Aryan, Old Iranian, Old Latin and Hittite, while traces of it can be found in the enclitic personal pronouns of the Tocharian languages.

== See also ==
- Indo-European vocabulary
- List of Indo-European languages
- Glossary of sound laws in the Indo-European languages
- Schleicher's fable
- The king and the god
- List of proto-languages

== Bibliography ==
- Clackson, James (18 October 2007). Indo-European Linguistics: An Introduction. Cambridge University Press. doi:10.1017/cbo9780511808616. ISBN 978-0-521-65367-1.
- Meier-Brügger, Michael (2003), Indo-European Linguistics, New York: De Gruyter, ISBN 3-110-17433-2
- Szemerenyi, Oswald J. L. (13 February 1997). Introduction to Indo-European Linguistics. Oxford University Press. doi:10.1093/oso/9780198240150.001.0001. ISBN 978-1-383-01320-7.
- Kümmel, Martin Joachim (2022). "Voiceless high vowels and syncope in older Indo-European" (PDF). Italian Journal of Linguistics. 32 (1): 175–190. doi:10.26346/1120-2726-153.
- Kümmel, Martin Joachim. "Uvular Stops or a Glottal Fricative? Theory and Data in Recent Reconstructions of PIE "Laryngeals"" (PDF). Seminar für Indogermanistik.
- Klein, Jared; Joseph, Brian; Fritz, Matthias, eds. (2017). Handbook of Comparative and Historical Indo-European Linguistics. Vol. 1. De Gruyter Mouton. doi:10.1515/9783110261288. ISBN 978-3-110-26128-8.
- Klein, Jared; Joseph, Brian; Fritz, Matthias, eds. (2017). Handbook of Comparative and Historical Indo-European Linguistics. Vol. 2. De Gruyter Mouton. doi:10.1515/9783110523874. ISBN 978-3-110-52387-4.
- Klein, Jared; Joseph, Brian; Fritz, Matthias, eds. (2018). Handbook of Comparative and Historical Indo-European Linguistics. Vol. 3. De Gruyter Mouton. doi:10.1515/9783110542431. ISBN 978-3-110-54243-1.
