= *kʷetwóres rule =

Sound law in Proto-Indo-European

The *kʷetwóres rule of Proto-Indo-European (PIE) is a sound law of PIE accent, stating that in a word of three syllables é-o-X the accent will be moved to the penultimate, e-ó-X. It had been observed by earlier scholars, but it was only in the 1980s that it attracted enough attention to be named, probably first by Helmut Rix in 1985. Examples:

- *kʷetwóres < *kʷétwores "four" (Latin: quattuor)
- singular accusatives,
  - of r-stems, *swes-ór-m̥ < *swés-or-m̥ "sister" acc. singular
  - of r-stems, *ǵʰes-ór-m̥ < *ǵʰés-or-m̥ "hand" acc. singular
  - of s-stems, *h₂ews-ós-m̥ < *h₂éws-os-m̥ "Ausos" (Vedic Sanskrit uṣā́sam)

The rule is fed by an assumed earlier sound law that changes è to ò after an accented syllable: *kʷetwóres < *kʷétwores < *kʷétweres.

Rix invoked the rule in the 1998 preface to the Lexikon der indogermanischen Verben (p. 22) to explain why in the PIE perfect the root ó grade is accented: *ǵe-ǵónh- / *ǵé-ǵn̥h- < *ǵé-ǵenh- / *ǵé-ǵn̥h- "created/engendered".

The rule has been invoked by Mottausch to explain accented ó grades in the PIE nominal ablaut.

== See also ==
- Glossary of sound laws in the Indo-European languages
