= Umbrian language =

Extinct Italic language of central Italy

Umbrian
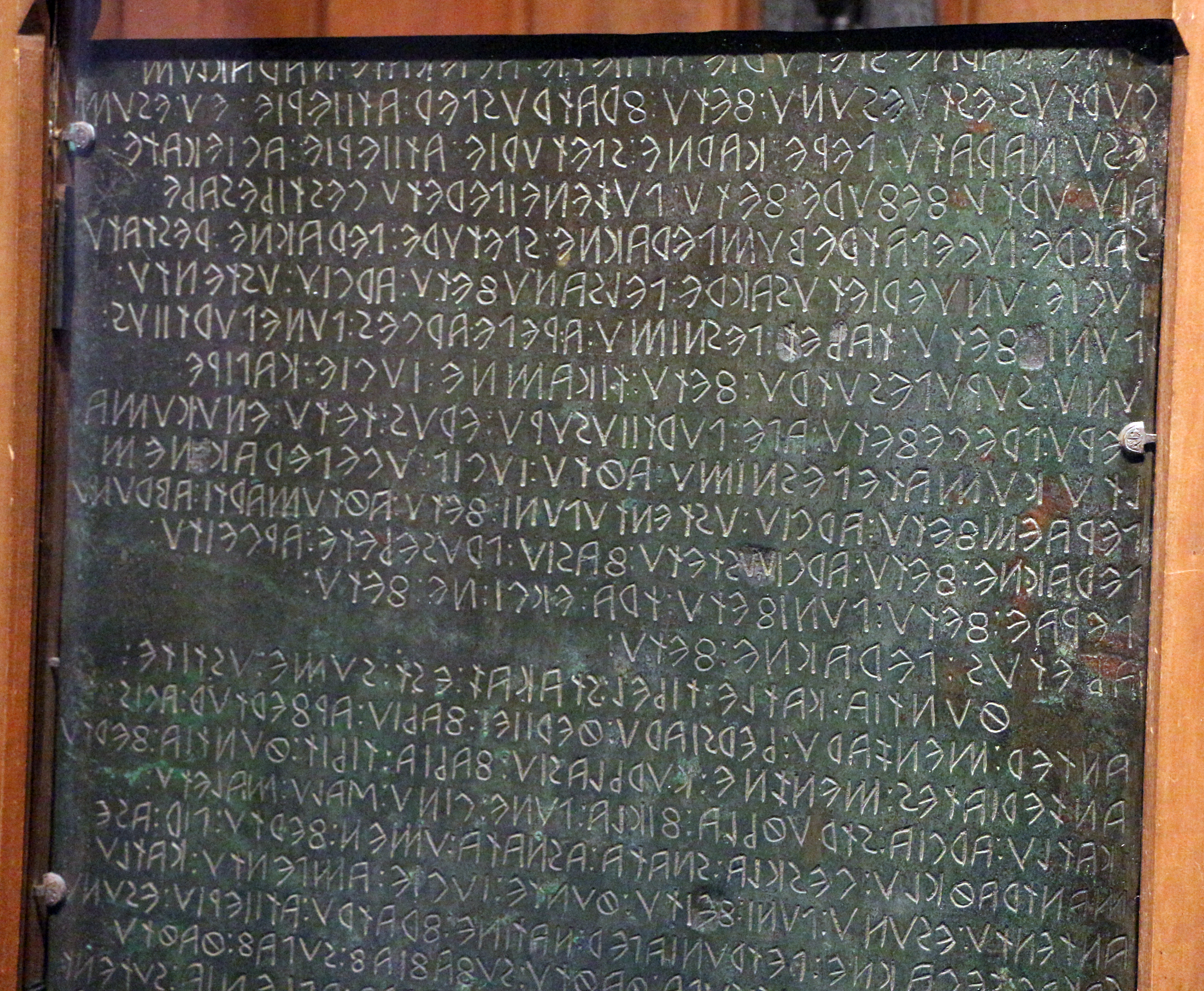
- Umbrian inscription on one of the Iguvine Tablets
- Native to: Umbria
- Region: central Italy
- Ethnicity: Umbri
- Extinct: after 1st century BC
- Language family: Indo-European: Italic; Osco-Umbrian; Umbrian
- Early forms: Proto-Indo-European: Proto-Italic
- Dialects: Marsian; Volscian; Aequian?; Sabine?; Umbrian proper
- Writing system: Umbrian and Old Italic alphabet

Language codes
- ISO 639-3: xum
- Glottolog: umbr1253
- Ethnolinguistic map of Italy in the Iron Age, before the Roman expansion and conquest of Italy

Umbrian is an extinct Italic language formerly spoken by the Umbri in the ancient Italian region of Umbria. Within the Italic languages it is closely related to the Oscan group and is therefore associated with it in the group of Osco-Umbrian languages, a term generally replaced by Sabellic in modern scholarship. Since that classification was first formulated, a number of other languages in ancient Italy were discovered to be more closely related to Umbrian. Therefore, a group, the Umbrian languages, was devised to contain them.

== Corpus ==
Umbrian is known from about 30 inscriptions dated from the 7th through 1st centuries BC. The largest cache by far is the Iguvine Tablets, seven inscribed bronze tablets found in 1444 near the village of Scheggia or, according to another tradition, in an underground chamber at Gubbio (ancient Iguvium). The seven tablets contain notes on the ceremonies and statutes for priests of the ancient religion in the region. Sometimes they are called the Eugubian tablets after the medieval name of Iguvium/Eugubium. The tablets contain 4000–5000 words.

Other minor inscriptions are from Todi, Assisi and Spoleto.

== Phonological history ==
=== Shared changes ===
Umbrian shares some phonological changes with its sister language Oscan.

==== Labialization of *kʷ to p ====
This change is shared with Umbrian, and so is a common Sabellic change, reminiscent of the k/p split between Goidellic (Irish, etc) and Brythonic (Welsh, etc). piře, pirse "what"; Oscan pídum vs Latin quid.

==== Initial stress and syncope ====
At some point early in the history of all Indo-European Italic languages, the accent seems to have shifted to the initial syllable of words as a stress accent, since non-initial syllables are regularly lost or weakened. Since the same pattern occurs in the history of Etruscan, this must be assumed to be an areal feature. (By the time of classical Latin, the accent had shifted in that language to more of an Ancient Greek pattern – on the third syllable from the end (antepenult) unless the last syllable was long, in which case it fell on the second to last syllable (the penult).) The degree to which these shifts can be connected to similar shifts to initial stress in Celtic and Germanic is unclear; for discussion see J. Salmons' Accentual Change and Language Contact.

Examples: Loss of unstressed short -e-: *onse "shoulder" < *omesei, compare Latin umerus; destre "on the right" < *deksiterer; ostendu "present" (imperative) < *obs-tendetōd, compare Latin ostendito.

=== Innovations unique to Umbrian (or not shared with Oscan) ===
But compared to its highly conservative sister language Oscan, Umbrian exhibits a number of innovations, some of them shared by its neighbor to the west, Latin. (Below, following convention, bold text for Umbrian and Oscan indicates words written in the native, Etruscan derived script, while italics represents words written in Latin-derived script.)

==== Treatment of original diphthongs ====
All diphthongs are simplified into monophthongs, a process only partly seen in Latin, and only very rarely in Oscan. So Proto-Italic *ai and *ei become Umbrian low ē: kvestur : Oscan kvaísstur, Latin quaestor 'official in charge of public revenue and expenditure'; prever 'single' : Oscan preivatud, Latin prīvus; furthermore, Proto-Italic *oi, *ou and *au become ō (written u in the native script) in initial syllables: unu 'one' : Old Latin oinus; ute 'or' : Oscan auti, Latin aut; tuta 'city' : Oscan touto.

==== Palatalization of velars ====
Velars are palatalized and spirantized before front vowels and the front glide /j/ to probably a palatalized sibilant (perhaps the postalveolar /ʃ/), written ç, ś or simply s. (A similar change happened later in the Romance languages.) For example: Umbrian śesna 'dinner' : Oscan kersnu, Latin cēna; Umbrian façiu 'I do, I make' : Latin faciō.

==== Rhotacism ====
Like Latin, but unlike Oscan, intervocalic -s- rhotacized to -r- in Umbrian. In late forms of the language, final -s also becomes -r (a change not seen in Latin). For example, the genitive plural ending of -ā stems: Umbrian -arum, Latin -arum vs Oscan -asúm (compare Sanskrit -āsām).

==== Treatment of *d ====
While initial *d- is preserved (spelled t in the native alphabet), earlier intervocalic *-d- (and sometimes *-l-) show up in the native alphabet as a character generally transliterated as ř, but as the sequence rs in Umbrian texts using the Latin alphabet. The exact pronunciation is unknown: piře, pirse "what" vs. Oscan pídum, Latin quid.

==== Vowels ====
Proto-Italic *ū became /i/, sim (accusative singular) <PI *sūm "pig"

== Phonology ==
The exact phonetics of much of what follows are not completely clear.

=== Consonants ===
The consonant inventory of Umbrian is as follows:

		Labial	Dental	Alveolar	Palatal	Velar	Glottal
Plosive	voiceless	p		t		k	
Plosive	voiced	b		d		g	
Fricative	voiceless	f		s	ç		(h)
Fricative	voiced		ð				
Nasal		m		n			
Lateral				l			
Rhotic				r			
Semivowel					j	w	

=== Vowels ===
Pure: a, e, i, o, u

Long: ā, ē, ī, ō, ū

Diphthongs: ai, ei, ou

== Alphabet ==
The Iguvine tablets were written in two alphabets. The older, the Umbrian alphabet, like other Old Italic scripts, was derived from the Etruscan alphabet, and was written right-to-left, essentially equivalent to the Neo-Etruscan, but using a letter shaped like a 'P' from the Archaic Etruscan alphabet for the unique Umbrian sound discussed above. The newer was written in the Latin script. The texts are sometimes called Old Umbrian and New Umbrian. The differences are mainly orthographic. For example, rs in the Latin alphabet is represented by a single character in the native script (generally transcribed as ř; this represents an unknown sound that developed regularly from intervocalic *-d- in most cases). To clearly distinguish them, the native script is generally transcribed in bold, the Latin in italics.

== Grammar ==
=== Nouns ===
==== Case functions ====
===== Accusative and dative =====
The accusative, just as in Latin, was used as the direct object of transitive verbs and with prepositions. There is also evidence of the cognate accusative, a function in Latin in which accusative nouns were often the object of related verbs. In Umbrian, this appears in the sentence "teio subocau suboco." The dative was used in both Latin and Umbrian to refer to the indirect object of transitive verbs, although it could also be the direct object of special verbs: the Umbrian verb "kuraia" ("to care for") is used with the dative in the sentence "ri esune kuraia" to express the meaning "to care for the divine thing," which in Latin would be expressed using the equivalent verb "curo" with the accusative. Certain compound verbs appear to have taken the dative, a linguistic peculiarity also present in Latin: In the sentence "prosesetir strusla fida arsueitu," the compound verb "arsueitu" takes the dative. Dative forms could also function as the indirect object of nouns with verbal meanings: "tikamne luvie," meaning "dedication for Jupiter." Like Latin, the Umbrian dative could be paired with adjectives: "futu fons pacer ... pople," meaning "It must be propitious ... for the people." The Umbrian dative could indicate the beneficiary or maleficiary of an action: this function, the dative of reference, appears in the sentence "aserio . . . anglaf esona mehe, tote Iioueine" ("observe... divine omens for me, for the city of Iguvinum").

===== Genitive =====
Like Latin, the genitive case was utilized to communicate both partitive and objective relationships between nouns. The partitive genitive, in which the genitive communicates that the noun is a smaller component of the genitive noun, appears in Umbrian sentences such as "mestru karu fratru," meaning "greater part of the [Arvales] brothers." However, unlike Latin, the partitive genitive in Umbrian may have also functioned as a subject in certain circumstances, a grammatical property that appears in Lithuanian, Avestan, and—rarely—Greek. This usage of the genitive is possibly attested in the sentence "," meaning "[whether] any of them are to be accepted." The genitive of possession, in which the genitive term is marked as the possessor, possibly appears in Umbrian sentences such as popluper totar Iiouinar, translating to "for the people of the city of Iguvium." However, within this sentence, the genitive could either be functioning in its capacity as a partitive or possessive genitive. Likewise, the genitive of characteristic may appear in the sentence "pisest totar Tarsinater," meaning "whoever is of the city of Tadinatus," although in this sentence the genitive may either be functioning as a genitive of characteristic or as a partitive genitive. The objective genitive, in which the genitive functions to communicate the object of nouns with verbal connotations, appears in Umbrian sentences such as "katle tiçel," meaning "dedication of the sacrificial animal," and "arsier frite," meaning "confidence in the holy one."

===== Ablative and locative =====
In contrast to Latin, in which the locative was reduced to rare and limited functions, the Umbrian locative retained much broader and more widespread use. The Umbrian locative was used to signify the place something occurred; thus, Umbrian terms locatives such as Acersoniem, meaning "at Acedonia," and "tote Iouine," meaning "at [city of] Iguvium." Locative forms such as fratrecate and maronatei, both of which refer to the time frame in which a specific individual held a political office, attest to the existence of a locative of time, which would indicate the time something occurred. Ablative forms were also utilized to communicate locative meanings: Umbrian phrases such as "tremnu serse" ("sitting in the tent") utilize the ablative to indicate the location where something occurred. The ablative, typically when accompanied by a preposition such as "ehe" ("ex;" "out of," "from") or a postpositive marker such as "-ta" or "-tu," could also indicate movement from a location: the terms term "akrutu" ("from the field") and the sentence"ehe esu poplu" ("from this people") both demonstrate this function of the ablative. Furthermore, the ablative in Umbrian could indicate the route through which movement had occurred: the sentence, "uia auiecla etuto" ("go by the augural way"), exemplifies this usage." Ablative forms could communicate the time something occurred, as demonstrated in the phrase "pesclu semu" ("in the middle of the prayer"). Both the ablative and locative appeared to be able to communicate the means by which in action occurred: the phrase "mani tenitu" ("to hold in the hand") utilizes the ablative form "mani" ("in the hand"), while the sentence "manuve habitu" ("to hold in the hand") utilizes the locative form manuve to communicate a similar meaning.

The ablative could also communicate the attendant circumstances surrounding an action, as demonstrated by sentences such as "eruhu tiçlu sestu luvepatre" ("present to Jupiter with the same dedication"). More broadly, the Umbrian ablative could signify accompaniment; it could communicate that an action was occurring with or alongside something. Such a meaning appears in sentences such as "com prinuatir stahitu" ("stand with the assistants"), which utilize the preposition "com" ("cum;" "with"). This preposition was dropped in scenarios where the notion of accompaniment could be substituted for the ablative of means or manner: "apretu tures et pure" ("go about [perform the lustration] with the bulls and the fire"). The preposition "-co(m)" or "-ku(m)," when used as a postpositive marker of an ablative term, communicated a locative meaning: "asaku" ("at the altar") and "termnuco" ("at the boundary"). Another, more miscellaneous usage of the Umbrian ablative is the ablative of price, which marks the cost of something: "muneklu habia numer prever pusti kastruvuf" ("shall receive a perquisite of one sesterce for each person"). There is also limited attestation of an ablative absolute in Umbrian: "aves anzeriates" ("when the birds have been observed"). The linguist Gary B. Holland suggests that it is possible this form merely constitutes a locative, as the locative plural is identical to the ablative plural in Umbrian.

==== Declension ====
===== First Declension =====
The Umbrian first declension retained the elongated -ā stem in the nominative singular, whereas in Latin it shortened to -a. However, the vowel "ā' in Umbrian became a more rounded vowel akin to the "a" in English "call." Umbrian also retained the elongated -ām stem in the accusative singular, although the final -m is often dropped in writing, likely because the final sound was pronounced so faintly that it was somewhat negligible. The accusative plural form derives from Proto-Italic -ans, which evolved into -af. The final -f was pronounced so weakly that it is often dropped often from inscriptions, although this is more common in the later Iguvine tablets written in the Latin script than the older Iguvine tablets written in the Old Italic script. For the dative singular, the Proto-Italic diphthong -āi was monophthongized to -ē. It was likely an open vowel as it is never misspelt with -i, which occurs frequently in the related Oscan language for terms with -ē or -oi in the final syllables. Like Latin, Umbrian dropped the final -d at the end of words; thus, the ablative singular form in Umbrian evolved into -ā from -ād. Umbrian inherited the genitive singular ending -ās from Proto-Italic, which also appears in Old Latin and persisted into Classical Latin through terms such as pater familias. The genitive plural ending, -āsōm, likely retained the long -ō as—in neither Oscan nor Umbrian—is vowel contraction observed prior to the final consonants r, t, l, and m. Although there is no attested first declension vocative plural, the vocative singular likely appears in certain names and was likely marked by the ending -a. Buck concludes that it was likely a short vowel as it is never misspelt as -o in inscriptions. The locative singular ending is identical with that of the dative singular and the locative plural is identical with that of the ablative plural. In Umbrian inscriptions, the locative ending was often suffixed by the postpositive form -en, which was sometimes written separately from the word (for instance, "tafle e fertu," meaning "to carry on a table") or merged with the term through contraction (see arven, meaning "into the field"). In some circumstances, the form altered to -em through contraction; for example, the term Acersoniem, meaning "at Acedonia." There is also evidence of masculine proper names bearing the same -ā stem of the first declension. Such names are occasionally borrowed from Greek, although they omit the final -s; names such as Arkiia from Ἀρχίας ("Arkhíās," "Archias"). Other names end in -as and appear to derive from Italic sources, such as Tanas or Markas. Only one oblique form for masculine first declension forms is attested: the accusative singular form Velliam. Another form, that possibly was a genitive singular of a masculine first declension term, is attested: Maraheis.

First Declension Feminine
Case	Singular	Plural
Nominative	-ā	-ās
Accusative	-ām	-āf
Dative	-ē	-ēs
Genitive	-ās	-āsōm
Ablative	-ā	-ēs
Vocative	-a	
Locative	-ē	-ēs

===== Second declension =====
The Proto-Italic nominative singular ending -os lost the -o, leaving the Umbrian nominative singular ending -s, as represented by Umbrian terms such as taçez ("quiet"). Umbrian preserved the Proto-Italic accusative plural ending -ōs, although it was represented in Umbrian by the graphemes -u, -us, -ur, and -ur. The accusative singular form was merely the vowel -o, occasionally written orthographically as -um or -om, although it was more common for the final -m to be omitted. Thus, the Umbrian word for "people" can be written as puplum or poplom and as puplu or poplo, presumably because the final -m was pronounced so faintly that it was often ignored. The accusative plural form -uf, or -of, deriving from Proto-Italic *-ons, was also written without the final -f, presumably because the sound was also pronounced so weakly that writers often opted to neglect it. During the transition from Proto-Italic, the dative singular form -ōi shortened to -oi and then was monophthongized in Umbrian. Orthographically, it was written as -e, -i, -e, -ei, and -i. Umbrian lost the final *-d of the Proto-Italic ablative singular ending *-ōd. The ablative singular was near unanimously transcribed as -u; the example somo constitutes the only definitive evidence of an ablative singular denoted by -o and the term maronato, although it has also been interpreted as a locative singular marked by -u, may be interpreted as an ablative singular form. The dative and ablative cases shared the same plural endings, which were orthographically represented by a multitude of forms:-e, -es , -er, -er, -er-e, -eir, -is, -is-co, and -ir. Of these endings, the most common is -ir, with -ir, -is-co appearing in over 100 inscriptions, although -eir only appears in 7 inscriptions and -er appears in only 6. Unlike the other second declension forms, which derived from Proto-Italic o-stem nouns, the genitive singular inherited the -eis from the Proto-Italic i-stem declension. It was typically represented in writing through the forms -es, -er, -er, although the endings -e and -e appear rarely. In contrast, the genitive plural ending was inherited from the equivalent Proto-Italic o-stem form -om and was typically represented in Umbrian -u, -o, or -om. The vocative singular form in Umbrian was -e and the locative singular was the long vowel -ē, frequently—or perhaps always—compounded with the postpositive -en.

Another subtype of the second declension appears in the second declension -io stem nouns, which derive from terms ending in - ȋom or -ȋos. The nominative and accusative singular in both masculine and neuter forms was marked by the phoneme -i, which could be written as -i or -im. However, these graphemes were relatively uncommon compared to the forms -e or -em, which appear in terms such as the nominative or accusative singular neuter form peřae or the accusative singular masculine form peřaem, both of which may derive from *pedaiiom. Other irregular forms may surface in the hapax "Fisei" possibly was an -io stem noun that conveyed the short vowel -i through the ending -ei, an orthographic choice that, although attested elsewhere in the language, remains uncommon. The term difue, possibly deriving from *dui-fuiom, may also have replaced the standard ending with -e. The remaining forms are identical with those of the standard second declension endings, although in the ablative and dative singular and plural forms contraction is possible. This feature, which is more common in Late Iguvine writings than Early Iguvine, can be overserved in the dative singular form Sansii, which can be alternatively written as Sansi or Sansie.

In addition to the masculine second declensions, there is also a slightly distinct morphology for neuter second declension forms. The only known differences between the second declension masculine and neuter forms appear in the nominative and accusative singular and plural: the neuter nominative and accusative singular are identical with each other and the masculine accusative singular, while the neuter accusative plural—which are also identical with each other—were represented by the ending -ā and were represented orthographically by -a, -u, or -o. There were other, rarer, endings utilize to mark the nominative or accusative neuter plural: the form -or is attested for the nominative plural and the forms -uf or -of, which could also be written without the final -f, are attested as representations of the accusative plural. Buck suggests that this irregularity possibly originated in the accusative plural before spreading the nominative; he suggests it was likely that it was motivated by the existence of parallel forms in the standard masculine nominative and accusative plural.

Second Declension Masculine			Second Declension Neuter	
Case	Singular	Plural	Singular	Plural
Nominative	-s	-**u**, -**us**, -**ur**, -ur	-**um**, -om	-**a**, -**u**, -o, -or
Accusative	-**um**, -om	-**uf**, -**u**, -of, -o	-**um**, -om	-**a**, -**u**, -**uf**, -o, -of,
Dative	-**e**, -**i**, -e, -ei, -i	-**e**, -**es**, -**er**, -er, -**er-e**, -eir, -**is**, -is-co, -ir		
Genitive	-**es**, -**er**, -er, -**e**, -e	-**u**, -o, or -om		
Ablative	-u	-**e**, -**es**, -**er**, -er, -**er-e**, -eir, -**is**, -is-co, -ir		
Vocative	-e			
Locative	-ē	-**e**, -**es**, -**er**, -er, -**er-e**, -eir, -**is**, -is-co, -ir		

===== Third declension =====
The Umbrian third declension, like the Latin third declension, merged forms from the Proto-Italic consonant stem and i-stem declensions. In Proto-Italic, the nominative singular of these declensions was -s and -is respectively. During the transition to Umbrian, the /i/ vowel was syncopated, producing a nominative singular ending -s for all third declension forms. However, the nominative plural endings vary depending on whether the term was inherited from the consonant or i-stem terms. I-stem terms likely inherited the ending -ēs, although the Oscan nominative plural formation "aídilis" Indicates that at least the Oscan language, and possibly the Osco-Umbrian languages at large, may have evolved the ending -īs according to the model of the first and second declension forms -ās and -ōs. Consonant stems syncopated the short vowel ending -es in Proto-Italic, resulting in a more unique evolution. The term frater, which is used in the nominative plural, presumably evolved from *frāteres, which contracted to *frāters before arriving at frater. This term is also misspelt as frateer in one inscription, which may provide evidence of compensatory lengthening.

In the accusative singular, Umbrian i-stem forms inherited the Proto-Italic ending -im, which was often represented by the graphemes -e or -em, although the spelling -im occurs rarely. For consonant stems, the Proto-Italic ending -əm was replaced by -om, which was borrowed from the second declension forms. The accusative plural ending, in the i-stem, shifted the final -ns in Proto-Italic -ins to -f, resulting in the form -if. However, the -f was often omitted in writing and the -i could be rendered as -e, sometimes including -ei-; thus, forms such as "tref," "tre," and "treif" appear for "trif." Consonant stems followed a more distinct evolution; although they contracted the -ns in Proto-Italic -ens to -f, they dropped the -e, leading to the form -f instead of the expected form -ēf. Such an evolution could theoretically have been explained through the syncopation of a short -e, however the contraction of -ns to -f appears to have been accompanied by the lengthening of the preceding vowel. It is possible, although disputed, that the original Proto-Italic forms contained long vowels, allowing for an explanation of the unusual form through regular syncopation. Buck proposes that, in the absence of the aforementioned explanation, the form may have emerged due to the influence of the accusative plural forms of the other declensions, which were typically preceded by the same phonemes as the -s of the nominative plural.

The i-stem forms developed the open vowel -ē in the dative singular, which was represented by the graphemes -e, -e, and—occasionally—-i, although this form is of exceptional rarity. I-stem forms also adopted an ablative singular form -īd, which was represented orthographically by either -i, -i, -ei, and—rarely—-e. In consonant stems, the ablative singular ending was -e. Umbrian consonant stem ablative singular forms are near-universally rendered as "-e" or "-e," with the exception of the term "persi" or " "peři" ("foot"), which is exclusively marked by the ending -i. The linguist Reuben J. Pitts regards this as a "lexical aberration," which may have resulted from influence by the i-stem forms. Pitts suggests that the restricted orthographical representations of the consonant-stem ablative singular indicates that it likely was an open-mid vowel, as the close-mid vowel forms were often represented by the graphemes -e, -e, -i, -i, and -ei. Moreover, Pitts argues that the ending was likely a short vowel as an—according to Pitts—a long vowel likely would have been raised to a close-mid vowel in Umbrian. The dative-ablative plural form, in i-stems, evolved from the Proto-Italic from *-iβos into *-ifos, which became -ifs through syncopation. The ending -ifs is attested in one Oscan term, "luisfaris," however all other Oscan and Umbrian forms showcases that the -fs was assimilated, leading to the -is ending found in Umbrian terms such as "avis." However, it was alternatively written with the -i substituted for -e; thus, Umbrian forms such as "aves." Consonant stems inherited their dative and ablative plural forms from the Proto-Italic u-stem nouns, resulting in forms such as "fratrus" and "karnus." Both i-stem and consonant stem third declension forms inherited the Proto-Italic i-stem genitive singular form *-eis, which was orthographically represented by the forms -es and -er. The third-declension locative singular ending is attested in terms such as "scalsie" and "ocre," both of which were marked graphically by the ending -e, although considers it likely that consonant-stem forms had inherited the Proto-Italic ending *-i while i-stem forms had inherited the Proto-Italic ending *-ei.

There are also attestations of neuter forms for the third declension. Terms such as "sacre" suggest that the Umbrian neuter nominative and accusative singular for third declension i-stem terms, like Latin, was marked by the ending -e, although other terms such as "sehemeniar" indicate that, also like Latin, the final -e could be omitted. There are a few examples of consonant stem third declension neuter nouns, such as "pir," "nome", and "tupak." Consonant stem neuter nouns inherited the *-ā ending from Proto-Italic for the nominative and accusative plural, while i-stem nouns evolved the ending -iā from Proto-Italic. The final -ā would change regularly according to the standard phonological and graphical rules in Umbrian governing the form of the final -ā vowel.

Third declension Consonant Stem			Third Declension i-Stem	
Case	Singular	Plural	Singular	Plural
Nominative	-s		-s	-ēs
Accusative	-om	-f	-e, -em	-if, -ef, -eif, -e
Dative		-us	-**e**, -e, -i	-is
Genitive	-**es**, -er		-**es**, -er	
Ablative	-e, -**e**	-us	-**i**, -i, -ei, -e	-is
Locative	-e	-us	-e	-is

===== Fourth and fifth declensions =====
There is little attestation as the Umbrian fourth or fifth declension. The fourth declension accusative singular was seemingly represented orthographically by the form -o, which was often used to represent the ending -um in Umbrian writings. Nominative and accusative plural forms are attested for the fourth declension neuter. It is likely that the ending was -uā, although it would have been represented orthographically in various ways according to the standard Umbrian writing conventions for final -ā. Other forms attested to a genitive singular ending in -or, a dative singular in -o, an ablative singular form in -i, and a dative-ablative plural in -us. One locative form is attested: manuv-e. The majority of attested Umbrian fourth declension terms appear feminine or neuter, however the Umbrian form mani appears masculine in contrast to the feminine Latin cognate manus. Few fifth declension forms are attested in Umbrian: the accusative plural "iouie," the dative-ablative plural "iouies," the dative singular "auie," the ablative singular "re," and the form "ri," which serves as both a dative or ablative singular.

Fourth Declension Feminine
Case	Singular	Plural
Nominative		
Accusative	-o	
Dative	-o	-us
Genitive	-or	
Ablative	-i	-us
Locative		-us

=== Adjectives and adverbs ===
Umbrian adjectives are declined according to the first and second or third declensions. The majority of attested Umbrian adjectives align with the first and second declension paradigms, although the few attested third declension adjectives are typically i-stem forms (such as "sakre," from "*sakri-"). Umbrian adverbs often derived their endings from the Proto-Italic ablatives *-ēd, *-ōd, *-ād; thus, Umbrian "prufe" ("probe;" "well"), "simo" (cognate with "cis", meaning "before," but the Umbrian term means "behind"), and subra ("supra;" "above"). Other adverbs, particularly those concerning time, derived from the Proto-Italic neuter accusative ending *-om: "promom" ("primum;" "first"). Umbrian pronominal adverbs such as "ponne ("quande;" "when")," presumably from "kʷom-de," also likely derived from Proto-Italic accusative neuter forms. The Proto-Indo-European comparative suffixes *-tero- and *-ero-, which appear in Ancient Greek and Sanskrit, lost their comparative connotations and instead were used to form pronominal adjectives and adjectives associated with time or place: "etru" ("another") and "postra" ("after").

=== Verbal system ===
==== Conjugation ====
The Umbrian first conjugation is distinguished by the thematic vowel -ā- in the present conjugation, although it typically appeared throughout the various inflected forms for each conjugation rather than exclusively the present. However, rare perfect and perfect passive forms without the morpheme -ā- are attested, such as the terms pruseçetu, prusekatu, and portust. This irregularity also appears in a select few first conjugation Latin verbs, such as the perfect form domui from domare. The inflected forms of the first conjugation were formed via the addition of the various suffixes that mark for person and number to the initial -ā, a transformation likely accompanied either by the contraction of the stem, leaving either -ā or -ō before the suffix. In Latin, second, third, or fourth conjugation verbs compounded with a preposition can transform into first conjugation verbs, consider the derivation of dedicare ("to dedicate") from dicere ("to say"). Likewise, the equivalent Umbrian verb dadíkatted derives from the verb deicum.

The Umbrian second conjugation, like the Latin second conjugation, is identified by the presence of the long vowel -ē- in the present stem, although—like Latin—it is often absent from the perfect stem. In Latin, attested verbs such as flevi from flere provide direct proof of the occasional, albeit rare, formation of perfect stem and passive participle with -ē; however, the existing Umbrian corpus provides no evidence of such irregularities. Another second conjugation verb, tiçit (equivalent of Latin "decet," "[it] is suitable for"), suggests that the thematic vowel of second conjugation Umbrian verbs could have alternated to -i-. It is also possible that -ei- was a rare marker for the Umbrian second conjugation: it appears in one verb, trebeit, although this term may have been a fourth conjugation verb.

The Umbrian third conjugation is marked by the short vowel -e just as in Latin, although Umbrian lacks third conjugation -iō verbs, which appear in Latin in verbs such facio, from facere). These verbs, throughout all Italic languages, derive from the -jō variant verbs in Proto-Italic, each of which—likely through vowel syncopation—evolved into a largely regularly-conjugated third or fourth conjugation verb in Umbrian whereas in Latin they constitute their own unique class between the third and fourth conjugations. Examples of Umbrian verbs with reduplicated stems, akin to Latin verbs such as sisto, appear Umbrian third conjugation verbs such as sestu, the exact equivalent of Latin sisto. However, other Umbrian verbs potentially showcase the loss of reduplication; for instance, the verb restef, possibly from *re-sisto. Fourth conjugation Umbrian verbs, like Latin, are marked by the phoneme -ī in the present stem. Furthermore, like Latin, perfect forms may lack -ī: Umbrian fakust is a form of the fourth conjugation Umbrian verb fasiu.

Present active infinitive forms in Umbrian took the ending -om, which likely derived from a Proto-Italic accusative formation. However, perfect passive infinitive forms were created through the present infinitive of the Umbrian verb for "to be" with a perfect passive participle. For instance, the Umbrian perfect passive infinitives "kuratu eru" (in Latin, "curatum esse") and "ehiato erom" (in Latin, "emissum esse"), meaning "to be cared for" and "to be sent from" respectively. There is limited evidence confirming the existence of supine forms in Umbrian akin to Latin: the only definitive example of a supine formation in Umbrian appears in the phrase aseriato etu, equivalent to Latin "observatum it," meaning "[who] shall go to observe."

==== Perfect formation ====
===== Perfect stem =====
Like other Italic languages, the Umbrian language merged the aorist and perfect tense found in Proto-Italic and Proto-Indo-European, although the Sabellic languages, a language family of which Umbrian is a member, preserved the forms of the Proto-Indo-European athematic second aorist while Latin preserved the perfect forms of Proto-Indo-European. These etymological differences created numerous morphological discrepancies between the Sabellic languages and the Latino-Faliscan languages, the subgroup of Italic languages containing Latin. In Umbrian, the perfect subjunctive was marked by the addition of the vowel -ē- to the ending while in Latin, it was marked by the vowel -ī-. Umbrian perfect stems likely could be formed by 5 distinct types of modification applied to the present stem of the verb: reduplication, the simple perfect, k-perfect, f-perfect, and—a form exclusive to Umbrian—the nky-perfect. Reduplication was the most common method of forming the perfect in the original Proto-Indo-European language and it typically involved the addition of the vowel -e- following the reduplicated syllable. Remnants of this technique appear in Umbrian verbs such as peperscust, in which the initial consonant of p- is reduplicated with an -e- vowel added between the two letters. However, perfect forms that are—in origin—reduplicated perfects may not follow this pattern. This category, referred to as the "simple perfects," comprise verbs such as dersicust, which likely derives from *dedik-, the perfect stem of the Proto-Italic verb *deikō. Although the original form was reduplicated according to the aforementioned pattern, the -d- changed to -ř- during the transition from Proto-Italic to Umbrian.

Umbrian perfect forms such as andirsafust demonstrate the f-perfect, a type of modification that forms perfect stems through the addition of the consonant -f-. The origin of this type of augment is unclear, although it may have derived from the univerbation of older terms. For instance, in the case of andirsafust, the term may have originated from the am-di-da-nt-s fust, although this etymology specifically is disputed. In Umbrian, perfect stems possibly could be marked through the addition of the consonant -s-, a modification that likely originates from the original sigmatic aorist of the Proto-Indo-European language. This form, the s-perfect, is entirely unattested in Umbrian with the possible exception of one form: sesust. However, this form is more often interpreted as a reduplicated perfect, leaving no evidence of the existence of s-perfects in Umbrian and thus compelling some linguists to reject the existence of such forms in the language.

The perfect marker -nsi-, -ns-, or -nç- appears in Umbrian terms such as purtinçus and purdinsiust. The etymological origins of this root are unclear, it may have emerged from a reconstructed Proto-Italic form *-nki-, itself possibly related to Proto-Indo-European *h₁neḱ- ("to bear, to bring."). This form was preserved into the Ancient Greek term ἤνεγκα (ḗnenka), the aorist form of φέρω ("phérō," "to bear," to "bring") and the Old Irish suffix -icc, found as a marker of perfective aspect in forms such do·uic, the perfect stem of do·beir ("to give," "to bring"). The linguist Kenneth Shields, Jr. argued that this perfect ending originated from the combination of third-person singular forms ending in *-Ø- with the deictic particle *-N, creating *-Ø-N. According to Shields, this form was later reanalyzed to produce *-N-Ø- and was then suffixed with *-ki, culminating in the form *-N-Ø-ki. This form may have then been reanalyzed as *-nky-Ø, concluding the process of evolution and creating the Umbrian perfect morpheme. Shields proposes that the term may be cognate with the Lithuanian imperative suffix -ki and that the deictic particle *-k can be observed in terms such as Latin cis ("on," "to this," "on this side") or Ancient Greek τῆτες (têtes, "this year"). The linguist David Jerrett, noting that perfect marker exclusively appears in denominal verbs, argued that the perfect stem originated from nouns combined with the perfect forms of an unattested Umbrian verb deriving from Proto-Indo-European ḱey- (meaning, "to lie down, to settle"), which may have developed a new meaning akin to "to set in motion, be in motion." Such a semantic shift occurred in other Indo-European languages: the Ancient Greek verbs "κινέω" ("kīnéō," "to set in motion, stir, meddle") or "κῐ́ω" ("kĭ́ō," "to go") and the Latin verb cieo ("to set in motion, move, stir") all demonstrate this transformation. When certain nouns were used alongside this unattested verb in periphrastic phrases, they may have merged together to create new verbs. Jerrett cites one possible example of such a development in the verb combifiansiust, which may have originated from the reconstructed noun *combifiam combined with the verb form 3rd person singular future perfect active form siust. Thus, Jerret proposes a semantic shift from "combifiam siust," meaning "has made an announcement," to "combifiansiust," meaning "has announced."

===== Future perfect formation =====
Uniquely, Sabellic future perfects are marked with the ending -us- and, in some cases, -ur-. The "-ur-" form appeared as, in Umbrian, intervocalic -s- became -r-. Both forms are of disputed etymology: it is possible that it relates to the Proto-Italic form fuiō, from the Proto-Indo-European form bʰuH-. These verbs, both meaning "to be," evolved into the Umbrian form fust, which possibly predicated the development of the similar future perfect endings. However, the linguist Nicholas Zair suggests that, given the dual meaning of fust as both a future and future perfect term, it is unlikely that it would evolve into an exclusively future perfect suffix. Furthermore, Zair considers it unlikely that the term would be reanalyzed into a unique suffix as it already consists of *-fu- combined with the future marker *-s. One proposal to rectify these concerns suggests that the suffix may originate from a reduplicated future perfect stem *fefus- , which, although formed from *fe-fu-s, came to be reanalyzed as *fe-f-us. Alternatively, it may have emerged due to the generalization of the zero-grade Proto-Indo-European perfect active participle root *-us- or the lengthened grade *-uōs- , itself possibly from *-uūs-. In either scenario, the forms would yield to -us- in Umbrian due to inevitable loss of initial *-u- after most consonants and the loss of long *-ū- in Oscan-Umbrian in non-initial syllables. However, the linguist Madison Beeler critiqued this theory, arguing that there is insufficient evidence for the existence of a perfect active participle in any Italic language related to the Proto-Indo-European perfect active participle, and consequently no evidence for the existence of such a form of Proto-Italic.

Another possibility is that this form is related the u-perfect in Latin, as seen in verbs such as habui or tenui. This theory holds that the original Sabellic future marker, *-s-, likely combined with a perfect marker in *-u- to form the Umbrian future perfect form -us-. Zair suggests that, although the Umbrian future perfect form was based on an original Sabellic perfect ending, it is entirely unrelated to the Latin -u perfect. Instead, Zair argues that it was likely related to the possible South Picene -ō- perfect formation, which is represented orthographically by -ú- and may appear in terms such as adstaíúh (meaning, "they set up"). According to Zair, the original Proto-Indo-European language formulated perfect terms through the reduplication of the initial consonant and the shift of the root into the o-grade, leading the creation of a perfect stem *-ō- that was transformed into a future perfect stem in Proto-Sabellic through the addition of the morpheme *-s-. Zair continues, proposing that the Proto-Sabellic language likely utilized the *-ō- morpheme in its perfect and aorist tenses, although these were largely lost during the generalization of the perfect stems following the loss of the aorist tense, leaving the future perfect form as the only remnant of the original *-ō- stem as there were no aorist parallels.

==== Voice ====
The Umbrian language inflected for two voices: the active, which concerned verbs performed by the subject, and the passive, which concerned verbs performed upon the subject. In Umbrian, the passive voice may have additionally partially fulfilled the role of the middle voice: The Umbrian verb amparihmu, a passive form, was utilized to express the middle meaning of "to raise, elevate oneself;" "to rise." Like Latin, the Umbrian language contained deponent verbs, verbs that—although passive in form—conveyed active meanings. However, terms that are deponent in Latin are regular in Umbrian and vice versa: the regular Umbrian verb stiplo is contrasted with the deponent Latin verb stipulor whereas the Umbrian deponent çersnatur is equivalent to the Latin active form cenaverint, an inflection oft the verb ceno.

==== Moods ====
The Umbrian language inflects for three grammatical moods: indicative, subjunctive, and imperative. In the Umbrian language, relative clauses are exclusively attested as utilizing the indicative; although, evidence from the closely related Oscan language indicates that it may have been possible to employ the subjunctive in relative clauses that expressed characteristic. Like Latin, the Umbrian subjunctive comprises the old functions of the original Proto-Italic optative and subjunctive, which fused together during the transition from Proto-Italic to Latin and Umbrian. Both the Latin and Umbrian languages exclusively preserved traces of the original optative in subjunctive inflections of verbs that derive from athematic Proto-Italic verbs: the athematic irregular Proto-Italic verb *esom, with the optative 3rd person singular inflection *siēd, evolved into Latin sit and the equivalent Umbrian form si. Umbrian and Latin are largely identical in their choice of derivation from either the Proto-Italic subjunctive or optative for their subjunctive forms respectively, although the Umbrian perfect subjunctive forms derive from the Proto-Italic subjunctive whereas in Latin they derive from the optative. Umbrian and Latin both contain the vowel -ā in the endings for the subjunctive forms of the second, third, and fourth conjugations (compare Latin terreat and Umbrian terisandu), while first conjugation verbs shift the -ā vowel in the stem to -ē. One possible exception to this rule appears in the Umbrian verb heriiei, which may constitute an -ē subjunctive of a third conjugation -iō verb, although this form may be explained as a perfect indicative form based on the perfect stem of the verb. The Umbrian present imperative is exclusively attested in two first conjugation forms: aserio ("observe") and stiplo ("bargain"), both substituting the final -ā for -ō. All other known Umbrian imperatives represent the future imperative.

The Subjunctive in Umbrian could also be used to express orders; the subjunctive of command is the most frequently appearing usage of the subjunctive in the Umbrian corpus. This jussive function of the subjunctive appears throughout the Iguvine tablets, which decree "fust eikvasese Atiierier, ere ri esune kuraia, prehabia pife uraku ri esuna," meaning "[the Flamen] shall have the care of the sacred affair; he shall furnish whatever is necessary." Carl Darling Buck, an American philologist, argued that, in the attested Umbrian corpus, the jussive subjunctive and the imperative were used largely interchangeably. However, the linguist D.M. Jones suggests that, while the imperative considered specific instructions, the jussive subjunctive was largely limited to descriptions of duties or punishments for officials. Thus, the aforementioned sentences utilized the subjunctive as they were outlining ritual practices for Flamini, while statements such as "di grabouie pihatu" (Jupiter Grabovius, purify!) utilize the imperative. In negative commands, which call for something to not occur, Umbrian primarily utilizes the imperative, although the subjunctive form neiřhabas appears in one inscription to mean "let them not use." Furthermore, this term appears to violate the previously established distinction between the subjunctive and the imperative, as it is used as an explicit instruction. The full sentence, reading "huntak piři prupehast eřek ures punes neiřhabas," may translate to "When he has purified the jar, thereafter they shall not use any of that mead." This interpretation proposes that the subjunctive form constitutes a special instruction outside of the original description of the ritual, thereby fitting the standard pattern of subjunctive use. However, Jones instead opts to resolve this anomaly with the translation "during the preliminary purification of the huntak the aforesaid mead is not to be used." Jones argues that this interpretation is not just a more accurate translation but also ensures consistency with the standard rules of the Umbrian subjunctive as—in his version—the prohibitive command is distinct from the actual section of the description of the ritual that first mentions the mead, and thus, there is some level of discontinuity between the two pieces of the text. The Umbrian subjunctive and imperative also seemingly shared the capacity to express optative meanings, a function that—in Latin—is fulfilled by the subjunctive of wish. The Iguvine tablets contain the phrase "fos sei, pacer sei," reading "may you be favorable, be propitious," which utilizes the subjunctive forms for optative meanings. However, it later contains a phrase of identical meaning which employs the imperative: "futu fos pacer."

Instances of a subjunctive of cause, in which the subjunctive is used in tandem with clauses of cause and result, are also attested in Umbrian. These clauses are typically introduced with the term pusi, the Umbrian equivalent of Latin ut, meaning—in such clauses—"so that." However, such clauses can also be introduced without the conjunction: the phrase stiplo aseriaia, reading "demand that I observe," expresses a meaning that can be translated into English utilizing the word "that," but lacks the equivalent Umbrian conjunction. Another Umbrian conjunction, sue or—alternatively—sve, meaning "if" (compare Latin "si"), was involved in indirect questions: the Umbrian sentence "Sve mestru karu fratru Atiief iu, pure ulu benurent, prusikurent kuratu rehte neip eru, enuk fratru ehvelklu feia fratreks ute kvestur, panta muta arferture si." reading "if the greater part of the Atiedii brothers announce it to not be properly cared for, then the magister or the quaestor should ask the brothers how many flamini there are." The conjunctions sue and sve were also often used to introduce conditional clauses, which typically contained two components: a main verb in the imperative or subjunctive of command, followed by a secondary statement completed with a verb in the future or future perfect tense. However, scant evidence has been preserved indicating that the present or perfect subjunctive may have also fulfilled this function. One example of a conditional clause without an introductory conjunction appears in the Iguvine tablets, which stipulates "Heriiei façiu arfertur... kurçlasiu façia tiçit," meaning "if the flamen wishes to make the sacrifice, it is proper." Jones suggests that the uses of the subjunctive may have extended to invocation, citing another passage from the Iguvine tablets which reads "di grabouie tio subocau." According to Jones, this statement utilizes a subjunctive form of "subocau" to mean "Jupiter Grabovius, I invoke thee."

==== Participles ====
The Umbrian language contained a present active participle attested in a handful of words, including "zeřef" ("sitting") and "restef" ("standing, stopping"). Umbrian also contained a gerundive, a future passive participle, with forms marked by -nn- in contrast to the Latin gerundive marker -nd-. Few gerundive Umbrian forms are attested, although the terms "pihaner" ("which is to be appeased"), pelsans (possibly means "which is to be buried"), and "anferener" ("which is to be carried around") are known. Perfect passive conjugations in Umbrian were formed via the combination of the perfect passive participle with the present form of the verb "to be." For instance, the Umbrian perfect passive formation "screhto est" ("it has been written"). Likewise, Umbrian future perfect passive conjugations could be formed via the combination of the perfect passive participle with the future form of the verb "to be." For example, the Umbrian phrase "pihaz fust," meaning "it will have been appeased." It is also possible that, like in Latin, Umbrian future perfect passive forms could be generated through the combination of the passive participle with the future perfect form of the verb "to be." Such as feature may be attested in the phrase "urtu fefure," possibly meaning "it will have arisen." However, Zair postulates that the term fefure may be alternatively interpreted as an orthographical mistake: the author may have intended to write fure but began writing fetu, a term which appears in the ensuing sentence. Vittore Pisani, an Italian linguist, suggested the form may have been perfect form marked by the suffix -re, equivalent to the Latin third-person plural active perfect suffix -ere, although Zair considers a perfect formation semantically unfeasible given the context of the sentence. Another proposal suggests that the term may have constituted an imperfect subjunctive equivalent to Old Latin foret, although such a usage of the imperfect subjunctive in the context of the statement is not paralleled in other Italic languages.

==== Endings ====
Verbs in Umbrian are inflected for the following categories:

- Tense (present, future, perfect, and future perfect)
- Voice (active, deponent/passive)
- Mood (indicative, imperative, subjunctive)
- Person (1st, 2nd, 3rd)
- Number (singular, plural)

Present, future and future perfect forms in the active voice use the following set of personal endings (primary):

	Singular	Plural
1st	-ō	
2nd	-s	
3rd	-t	-nt

Perfect indicative and all tenses of the subjunctive in the active voice use a different set of endings (secondary):

	Singular	Plural
1st	-m	
2nd	-s	
3rd	-∅	-ns

Passive endings are attested only for the 3rd person: singular primary -ter, singular secondary -(n)tur, plural -endi.

Perfect stems are derived from the present stem in different ways. Latin -vī- perfects are not attested in Umbrian. Instead, Umbrian uses its own set of forms, including reduplicated perfects such as dede 'gave', the -s- suffix, as in sesu-s-t 'will have sat', and the -nçi- suffix, as in purdi-nçi-ust 'will have presented'. Some verbs also use suppletive forms.

Other tenses are formed by suffixation:

Mood	Tense	Stem	Suffix	Example
Indicative	Future	Present	-(e)s-	prupeha-s-t 'piabit'
Indicative	Future perfect	Perfect	-us-	**fak-us-t'**
Subjunctive	Present	Present	-iā- (for a-stems), -ā- (for other stems)	'habi-a 'should hold'
Subjunctive	Perfect	Perfect	-ē-	**heriiei**

The following non-finite forms are attested (all of them are based on the present stem):

Form	Suffix	Example
Present active participle	-nt-	**kutef** 'murmuring' (-f < *-ns < *-nts)
Past participle	-to-	**çersnatur** 'having dined' (Nom.pl. masc.)
Present active infinitive	-om	er-om 'to be'
Present passive infinitive	-fi/-fir	piha-fi 'to be expiated'
Supine	-to(m)	aseriato 'for the purpose of observing'
Gerundive	-nno-	pihaner 'purify' (Gen.sg. masc.)

== Sample texts ==
Taken from the Iguvine Tablets, tablet Va, lines 6–10 (written in the native alphabet on the tablet):

(6) ...Sakreu (7) perakneu upetu, revestu, puře teřte, (8) eru emantu herte, et pihaklu pune (9) tribřiçu fuiest, akrutu revestu (10) emantu herte...

In Latin:

(6-7) ...Hostia solemnis digito, revisito, cum datur, (8) (aliquae) earum accipiantur oportetne, et cum piaculorum (9) ternio fiet, ex agro revisito (10) accipiantur oportetne...

In English:

(6–7) Let him select the sacrificial victims, and when they are given over, let him inspect them (8) to see if (any) of them are to be accepted, and in the case of (9) a triple offering, let him inspect them in the country (10) to see if they are to be accepted.

Taken from the Iguvine Tablets, tablet VIa, lines 25–31 (written in the Latin alphabet on the tablet):

(25)...Dei grabouie orer ose persei ocre fisie pir orto est (26) toteme iouine arsmor dersecor subator sent pusei neip heritu. (27) dei crabouie persei tuer perscler uaseto est pesetom est peretom est (28) frosetom est daetom est tuer perscler uirseto auirseto uas est. di grabouie persei mersei esu bue (29) peracrei pihaclu pihafei. di.grabouie pihatu ocre fisei pihatu tota iouina. di.grabouie pihatu ocrer (30) fisier totar iouinar nome nerf arsmo ueiro pequo castruo fri pihatu futu fos pacer pase tua ocre fisi (31) tote iiouine erer nomne erar nomne. di.grabouie saluo seritu ocre fisi salua seritu tota iiouina.

In Latin:

(25)...Iovi Grabovie illius opere, si in montis Fisie ignis ortus est (26) civitate Iguvina, ritus debiti omissi sunt quasi nec consulto. (27) Iovi Grabovie si in tui sacrifici, vitiatum est, peccatum est, peritum est, (28) fraudatum est, defectum est, tui sacrifici visum, invisum, vitium est. Iovi Grabovie si ius sit hoc bove (29) optimo piaculo piator. Iovi Grabovie piato montem Fisiem piato civitatem Iguvinam piato montis Fisie piato civitatem (30) Iguvina nomen magistratus, formationes, viros, pecua, castra, fructus, piato esto favens propitius pace tua monti Fisii (31) civitati Iguvinae eius nomini eas nomini. Iovi Grabovie salvum servato montem Fisii salvam servato civitatem Iguvinae.

In English:

(25)...Jupiter Grabovius, if on the Fisian mount fire has arisen, or if in the (26) nation of Iguvium the owed preparations have been omitted, let it be as if they had been made. (27) Jupiter Grabovius, if in your sacrifice (anything) has been done wrongly, mistaken, transgressed, (28) deceived, left out, (if) in your ritual there is a seen or unseen flaw, Jupiter Grabovius, if it be right for this (29) yearling ox as purificatory offering to be purified, Jupiter Grabovius, purify the Fisian Mount, purify the Iguvine state. Jupiter Grabovius, purify the name of the Fisian Mount (and) of the Iguvine state, purify the magistrates (and) formulations, men (and) cattle, heads (of grain) (and) fruits, Be favorable (and) propitious in your peace to the Fisian Mount, (31) to the Iguvine state, to the name of that, to the name of this. Jupiter Grabovius, keep safe the Fisian Mount, keep safe the Iguvine state.

== Sources ==
- Pio Paolucci (1966). Scheggia - Note Critico-Storiche (PDF) (in Italian). Empoli: La Toscografica. Archived (PDF) from the original on 2020-05-03.
- Beeler, Madison (1980). "The Future Perfect in Oscan-Umbrian". In Izzo, Herbert (ed.). Italic and Romance Linguistic Studies in Honor of Ernst Pulgram. Benjamins. ISBN 978-90-272-3511-4.
- Buck, Carl Darling (1904). A Grammar Of Oscan And Umbrian: With A Collection Of Inscriptions And A Glossary. Kessinger. ISBN 978-1-4326-9132-5.
- Buck, Carl Darling (1895). The Oscan-Umbrian verb-system. Chicago: University of Chicago Press. OCLC 18437456.
- deMello, Kaleb (2024-05-01). "The Sabellic Verbal Systems". Honors Scholar Theses.
- Holland, Gary B. (1986). "Nominal Sentences and the Origin of Absolute Constructions in Indo-European". Zeitschrift für vergleichende Sprachforschung. 99 (2): 163–193. ISSN 0044-3646.
- Jerrett, David H. (1974). "The Umbrian -NKY- Perfect". Transactions of the American Philological Association (1974-2014). 104: 169–178. doi:10.2307/2936088. ISSN 0360-5949.
- Jones, D. M. (1962). "Imperative and jussive subjunctive in Umbrian". Glotta. 40 (3/4): 210–219. ISSN 0017-1298.
- Markey, T. L. (1985). "Some Italic Perfects Revisited". Zeitschrift für vergleichende Sprachforschung. 98 (2): 260–268. ISSN 0044-3646.
- Pitts, Reuben J. (2020-01-01). "The Italic Consonant Stem Ablative: Some Comparative and Theoretical Arguments for an Inherited Ending in *-d". Symbolae Osloenses. 94 (1): 103–124. doi:10.1080/00397679.2020.1876917. ISSN 0039-7679.
- Piwowarczyk, Dariusz R. (2011-10-12). "Formations of the perfect in the Sabellic languages with the Italic and Indo-European background". Studia Linguistica Universitatis Iagellonicae Cracoviensis. 128 (1): 103–126.
- Poultney, James Wilson (1959). Bronze tables of Iguvium. Baltimore: American Philological Association.
- Shields, Kenneth (1989). "The Origin of the Umbrian Perfect Suffix *-nky-". Historische Sprachforschung / Historical Linguistics. 102 (1): 74–83. ISSN 0935-3518.
- Sihler, Andrew L. (1995), New Comparative Grammar of Greek and Latin, Oxford University Press, ISBN 0-19-508345-8
- Wallace, Rex E. (2007). The Sabellic Languages of Ancient Italy. Munich: LINCOM.
- Zair, Nicholas (2014). "The Future Perfect in Oscan and Umbrian, and the Ō-Perfect in South Picene". Transactions of the Philological Society. 112 (3): 367–385. doi:10.1111/1467-968X.12032. ISSN 1467-968X.
