= Scheggia Pass =

- Location within Alps
- Elevation: 632 metres (2,073 ft)

Third Approach
- Location: Italy
- Range: Umbrian Apennines
- Coordinates: 43°24′20″N 12°39′30″E

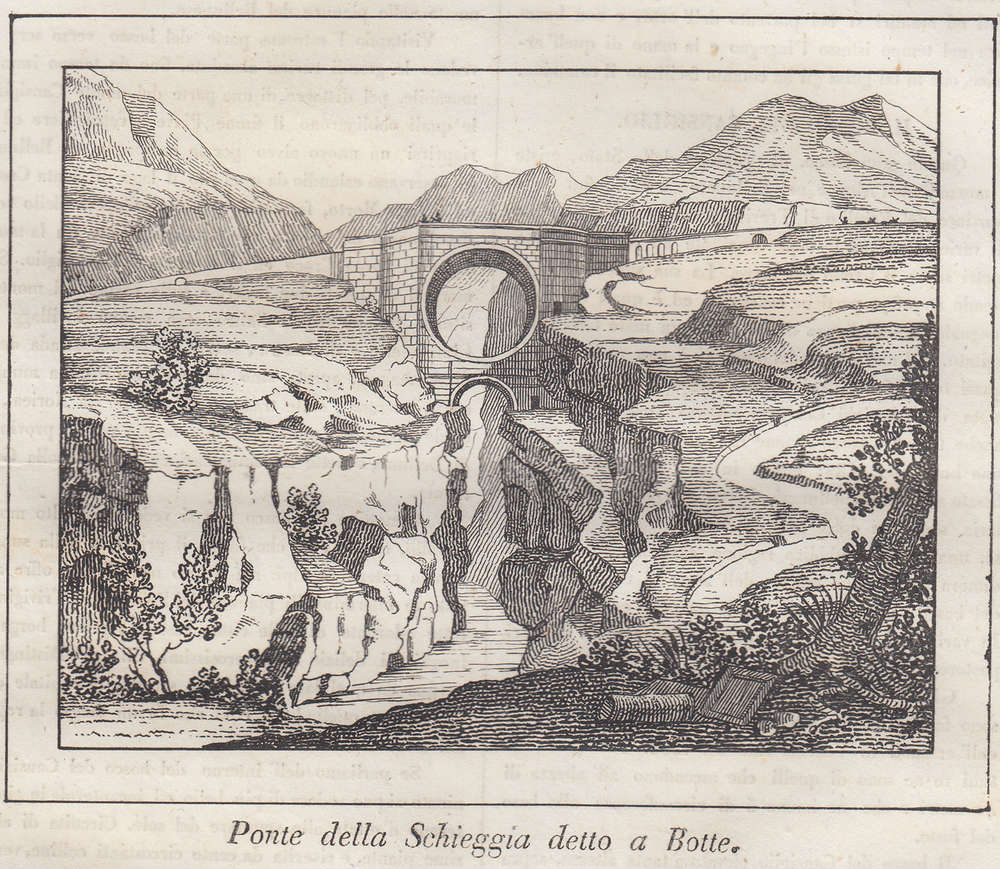
The Ponte a botte ("Barrel bridge") along the Via Flaminia near Scheggia in a 1837 xylography. It is presumed that the temple of Jupiter Apenninus was located on the mountain above the southern (right) part of the bridge

The Scheggia Pass is a pass in Italy that marks the division between the Central and Northern Apennines. It is in northern Umbria and lies between Gubbio and Cagli at 632 meters. It opens up as a natural plateau near the border with the territory of the municipality of Cantiano, in the province of Pesaro and Urbino.

Although it is on the border between Umbria and Marche, it does not represent a watershed between the Adriatic and Tyrrhenian sides: in fact, it connects the Burano valley (Metauro basin) to the Sentino valley (Esino basin). The watershed is located further south, between Scheggia and Costacciaro, dividing the Sentino valley from the Chiascio valley.

Coming from the direction of Rome, after Scheggia there is a gentle climb up to the pass proper, beyond which the road descends rapidly towards the border with Marche with a few bends until it reaches a barrel bridge built entirely of stone during the 19th century.

An Umbrian and then Roman temple dedicated to Jupiter Apenninus once stood there, as is also suggested by some Roman baths found nearby.

== See also ==
- List of mountain passes

== Sources ==
- Pio Paolucci (1966). Scheggia - Note Critico-Storiche (PDF) (in Italian). Empoli: La Toscografica.
- AA.VV. (2004). Umbria. Guida d'Italia (in Italian). Milano: Touring Club Italiano.
