= Scheggia e Pascelupo =

- Comune
- Comune di Scheggia e Pascelupo
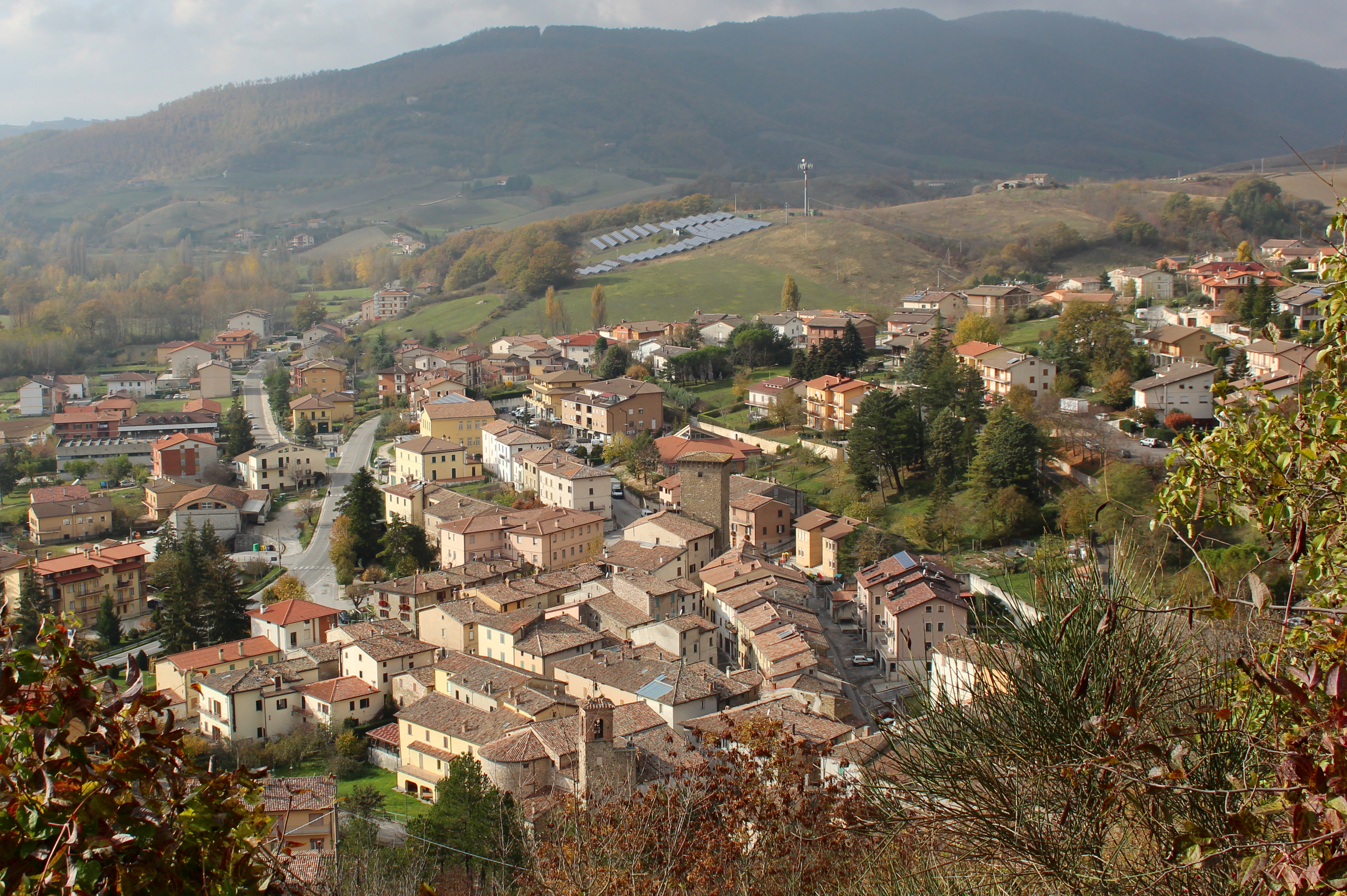
- Panorama of Scheggia

- Coat of arms

- Location within Italy Location within Umbria
- Coordinates: 43.403642°N 12.668168°E
- Country: Italy
- Region: Umbria
- Province: Perugia (PG)

Government
  - Mayor: Fabio Vergari

Area
  - Total: 63 km^{2} (24 sq mi)
- Elevation: 580 m (1,900 ft)

Population (1 January 2025)
  - Total: 1,246
  - Density: 20/km^{2} (51/sq mi)
- Demonym: Scheggiaioli
- Time zone: UTC+1 (CET)
  - Summer (DST): UTC+2 (CEST)
- Postal code: 06027
- Dialing code: 075
- Website: Official website

Scheggia e Pascelupo is a comune (municipality) in the Province of Perugia in the Italian region Umbria, located about 40 km northeast of Perugia.

The municipal seat is located in the main village of Scheggia, just below Scheggia Pass on Route SS/SR 3 Flaminia, following the ancient Via Flaminia.

== Etymology ==
The area of Scheggia was known in antiquity as Ad Ensem, a Roman mutatio on the Via Flaminia. During the Gothic War (535–554) the station was destroyed. It was soon rebuilt by the Byzantines in order to restrain Lombard incursions. The new settlement was called Schiza by the local inhabitants, whose speech still reflected the influence of the Greek language.

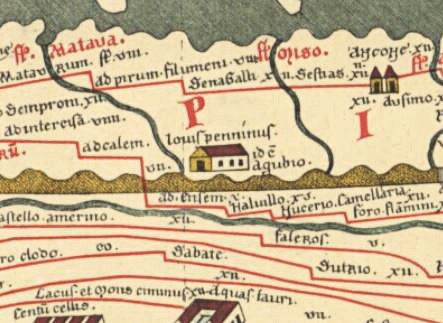
Ad Ensem on a reconstructed Tabula Peutingeriana

== History ==
Scheggia and Pascelupo originally formed two separate municipalities.

The origins of Scheggia date back to the Roman period. The site was a mansio (an official stopping place) named Mutatio ad Hensem on the Via Flaminia, at the crossing with the path Gubbio – Sassoferrato, which here crossed the Appennini.

Scheggia is identified with the site of the ancient city of Luceoli, an episcopal seat until the 10th century. During the Gothic Wars the settlement suffered fires and destruction under Narses, and its population was dispersed. It recovered shortly afterwards and was later listed by Anastasius Bibliothecarius among the cities included in the dominion of Pepin.

In the 12th century the village was a possession of the Hermitage of Fonte Avellana, founded by Saint Romuald on the slope of Monte Catria. This retreat later became a large Benedictine monastery, which ruled on the whole territory around Scheggia.

In the surrounding area, Scheggia exercised control over various nearby sites, including Branca and Torre Calzolari. Two castles once stood on the mountain above Scheggia, leaving the place-name Pian di Castello. During the Middle Ages Scheggia came under the control of Perugia.

Pascelupo originated in the medieval period as the Castrum Pascelupi, founded on the remains of an earlier fortress built by Gubbio to defend its borders with the Duchy of Urbino.

In 1396 both centers passed to the rule of the Montefeltro family, and were later incorporated into the Papal States.

In 1444 near Scheggia were possibly found the Iguvine Tablets, the most important document of the Umbrian language.

On 23 December 1860 the territory was transferred from the Province of Urbino to Umbria. In 1878 Scheggia was merged with Pascelupo, forming the current municipality.

In 1895 the municipality had a population of 2,697 inhabitants.

== Geography ==
Scheggia lies along the Via Flaminia within the central Apennine chain, at a short distance from the slopes of Monte Catria. The surrounding area includes mountainous terrain, such as Monte Petrara and Monte Cucco. Scheggia lies about 51 kilometres (32 mi) from Perugia, south of Cagli and north-east of Gubbio.

The area is crossed by the Santino stream, which is spanned by a stone bridge built in 1789. Another notable structure is an oval-shaped bridge connecting the mountains known as Bandito and Bagni, constructed toward the end of the 18th century and commonly referred to as the botte della Scheggia.

Pascelupo stands on the northern slopes of Monte Cucco, near the source of the small Pascelupo stream, which descends rapidly from the mountain and flows into the Cantiano river. The settlement lies about 60 kilometres (37 mi) from Perugia and approximately 20 kilometres (12 mi) from Gubbio.

Scheggia e Pascelupo borders with the following municipalities: Cantiano, Costacciaro, Frontone, Gubbio, Sassoferrato, and Serra Sant'Abbondio.

=== Subdivisions ===
The municipality includes the localities of Aiale, Belvedere, Buotano, Campitello, Coldipeccio, Isola Fossara, Montebollo, Pascelupo, Perticano, Pezza, Pietragrossa, Ponte Calcara, Scheggia, Serra.

In 2021, 185 people lived in rural dispersed dwellings not assigned to any named locality. At the time, most of the population lived in Scheggia (638).

== Economy ==
In the 19th century the territory of Scheggia and Pascelupo produced abundant pasture, particularly acorns, and also yielded grain and wine. Pascelupo was noted for its pork, considered of high quality and widely traded in neighboring areas.

== Religion and culture ==
=== Hermitage of Monte Cucco ===
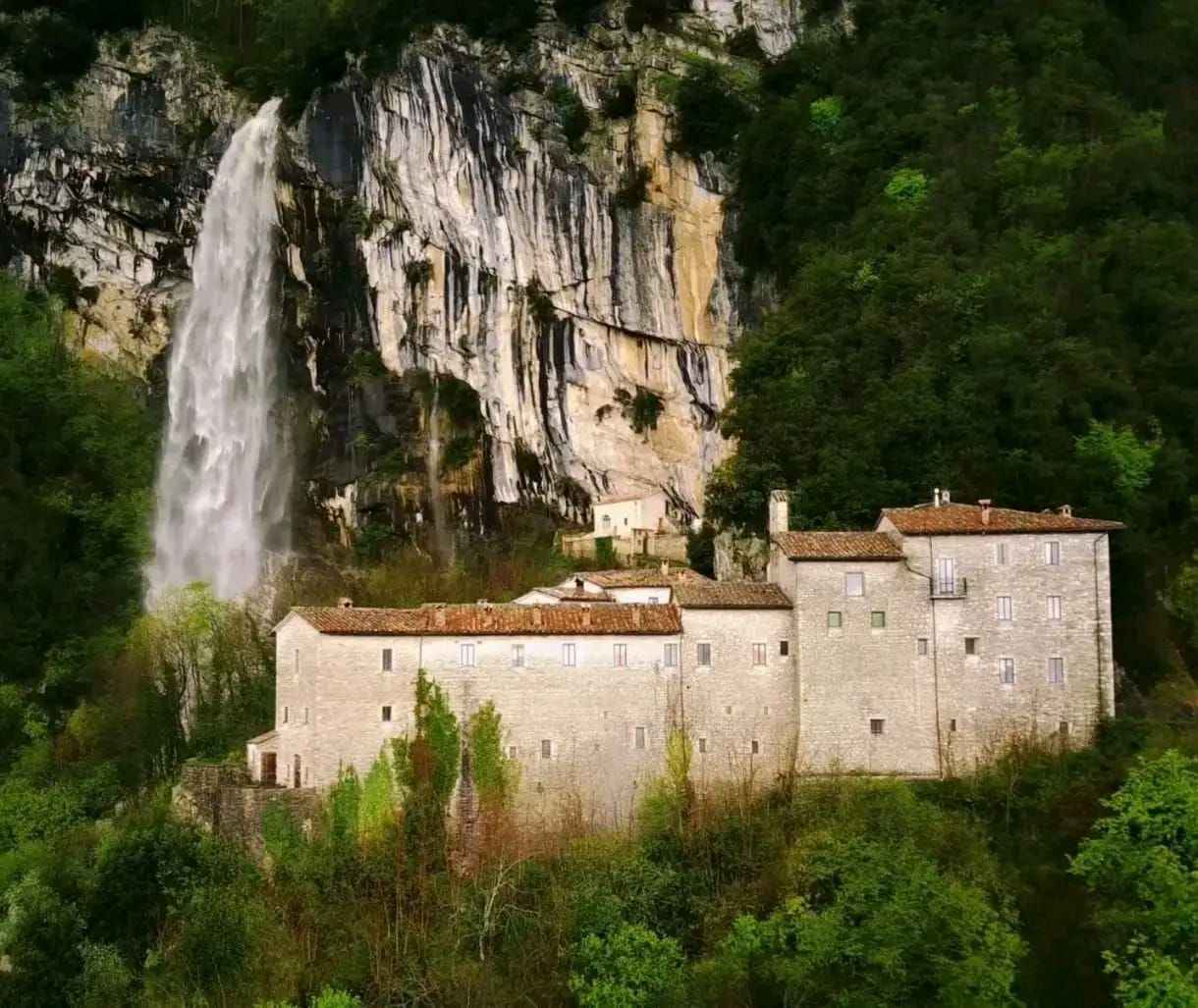
Hermitage of Monte Cucco

The hermitage of Monte Cucco (or hermitage of San Girolamo) is located on the eastern slope of Monte Cucco and is reached by the road connecting Scheggia with Sassoferrato through the Gola del Corno di Catria.

The earliest church dates to the 11th century and consists of three large stone structures with barrel vaults and a tall central tower. The internal architectural elements and the stone-framed windows show Romanesque forms. At the base of the rock face small caves contain the ancient cells of the hermits. A narrow path connects them to the cenobium built around the 14th century on a spur overlooking the valley of the Rio Freddo.

Tradition holds that Saint Jerome took refuge at this site around the year 1000 to escape persecutions. The hermitage was also associated with Saint Dominic Loricatus, and with the Blessed Thomas of Costacciaro, who lived there in solitude for more than forty years at the end of the 13th century.

In 1521 it was formally declared a hermitage by the Blessed Paul Giustiniani, becoming one of the first hermitages of the Camaldolese Congregation of Monte Corona. From that time until the early 19th century it functioned as a cultural center with a pharmacy, garden and library. It later declined and was closed in 1925. After a long period of abandonment, restoration works began in 1981 and the hermitage was reopened in 1992 by Camaldolese hermits.

=== Abbey of Sitria ===
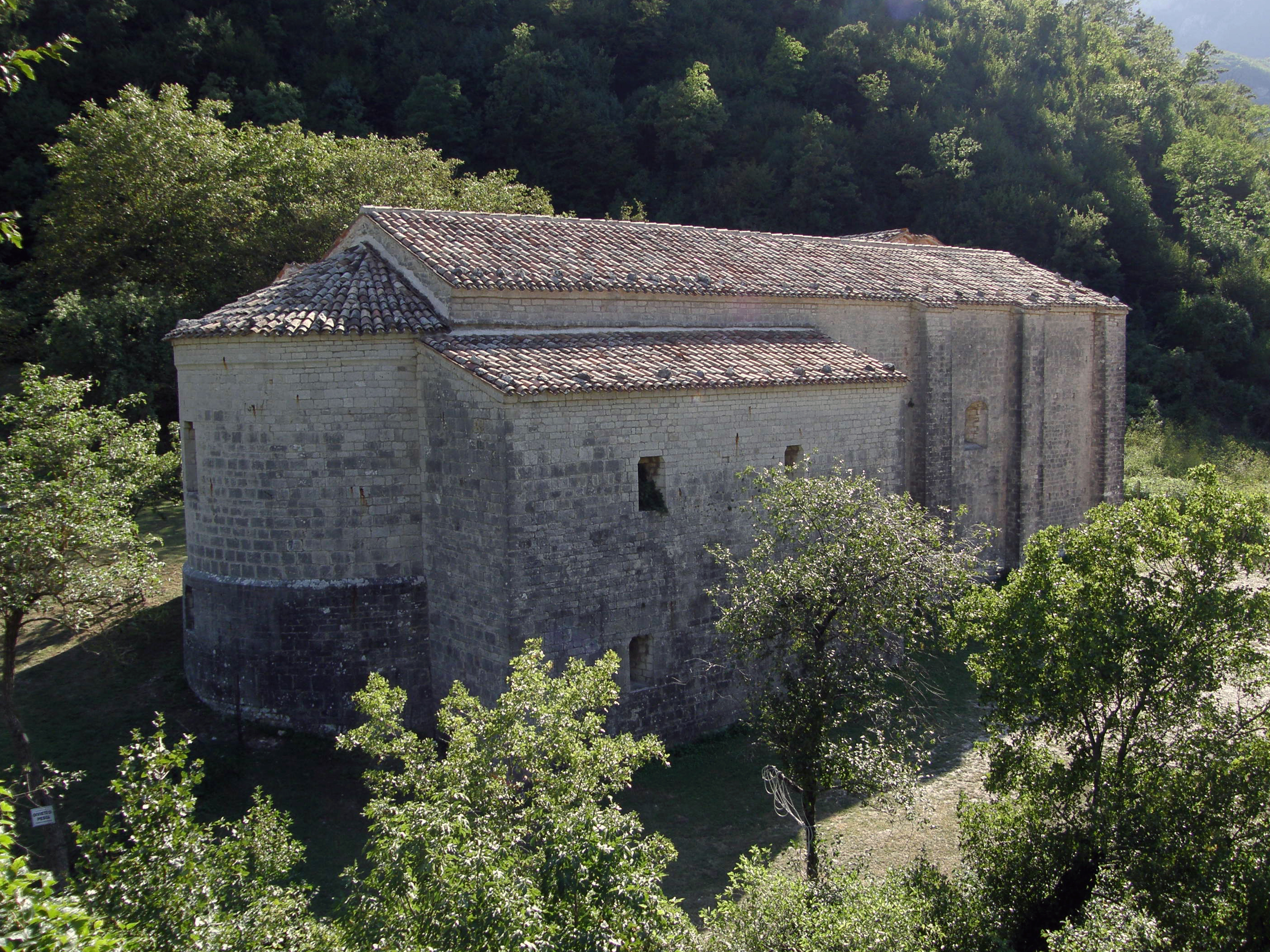
Abbey of Sitria

The Abbey of Sitria is located in a valley between the Artino stream and the slopes of Mount Catria along the route connecting Scheggia and Isola Fossara. The church, dating to the 11th century, has a Latin cross plan with a single nave. The presbytery is strongly raised and ends in a semicircular apse.

The building is constructed entirely of squared stone. The nave is covered by a pointed barrel vault resting on a continuous support along the perimeter walls, while the apse has a semi-dome vault with traces of an 18th-century fresco. Inside stands a 13th-century travertine altar formed by a stone slab supported by fourteen slender columns joined by small arches.

Beneath the church is a crypt reached by a narrow staircase at the base of the transept. The small chamber ends in an apse and has a vaulted ceiling supported by a single monolithic column with a Corinthian capital of the 6th century, probably reused from nearby buildings. The original hermitage once consisted of small cells built of stone and wood, but no remains survive.

According to the historian Iacobilli, the abbey was founded in 1017 by Saint Romuald, who spent the last years of his life there in seclusion. Over time the abbey expanded and incorporated many churches. In the 14th century it entered a period of decline, and in 1450 Pope Nicholas V granted it in commendam. The commendatory abbots restored it in the 16th century. Their administration lasted until 1810, when Pope Gregory XVI assigned the complex to the nearby monastery of Fonte Avellana.

In 1861 the Italian government suppressed the abbey's properties and transferred them to private ownership. The church became a farmhouse and the baptismal font was moved to the church of Isola Fossara. The complex later returned to the monks of Fonte Avellana, who restored it in 1972.

=== Abbey of Congiuntoli ===
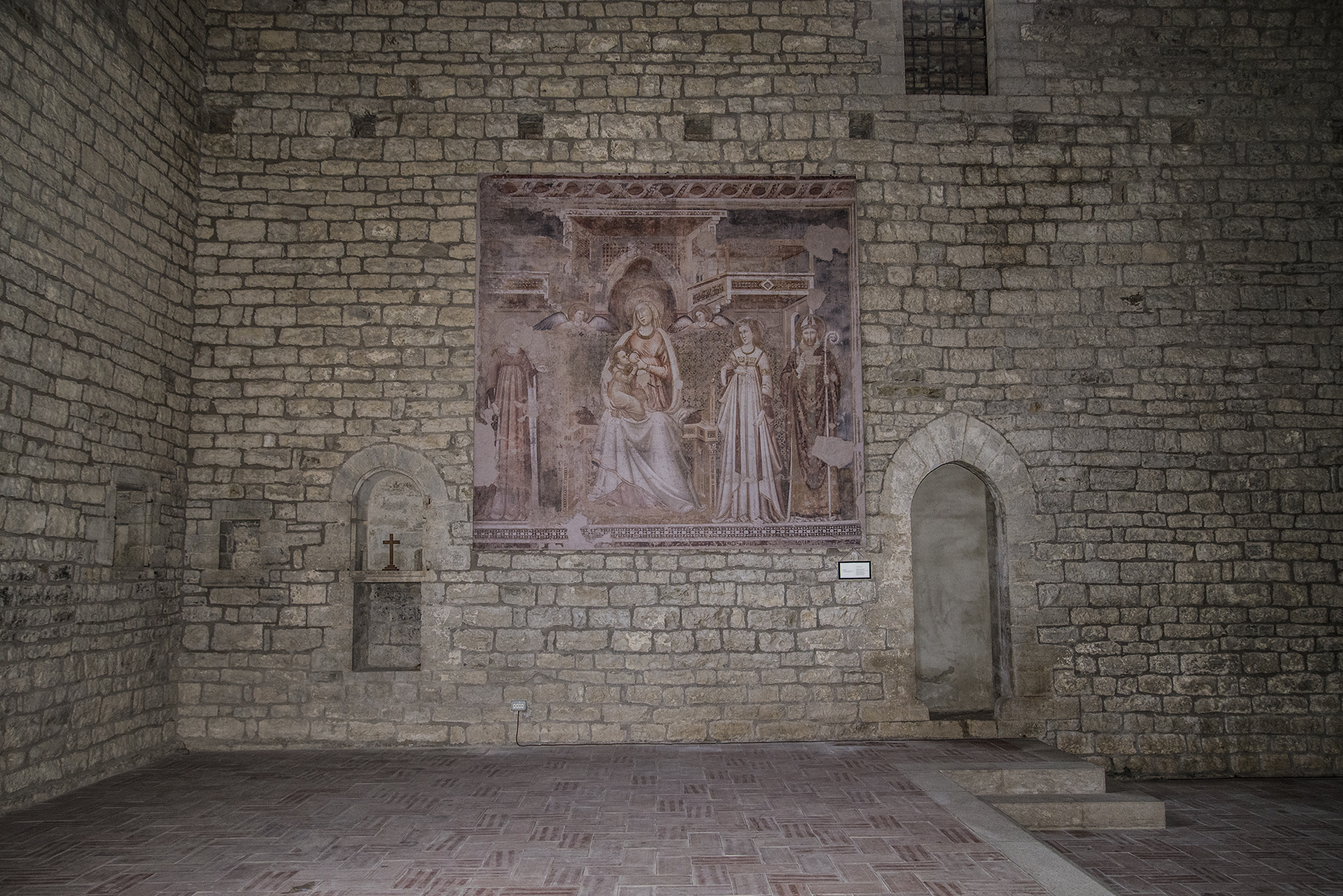
Wall fresco of the Madonna with Child, Abbey of Congiuntoli

The Abbey of Congiuntoli lies along the road that runs on the slopes of Mount Catria between Scheggia and Sassoferrato, at the confluence of the Sentino River and the Rio Freddo, from which the name Congiuntoli derives. The complex, built in white stone, consists of a church and monastic buildings.

The church was probably built in 1286, a date carved on a plaque inside the building, replacing an earlier chapel from 1201 whose apse was demolished to connect it with the present structure. The wider nave was likely reserved for the monks of the abbey and communicates with the internal rooms of the monastic complex, while the narrower nave, entered from the outside, served the local inhabitants.

The church has a rectangular plan with two naves of different widths separated by a row of octagonal columns supporting round arches. The presbytery is slightly raised above the naves. The gabled façade has a roofline decorated with stone corbels, and pointed windows illuminate the interior.

The complex also preserves monastic rooms with vaulted ceilings, now used as dwellings and rural outbuildings, part of the cloister with a portico covered by ribbed vaults, and a tower that likely served a defensive function.

=== Other religious buildings ===
The church of Santi Filippo e Giacomo serves as the principal church of Scheggia. The main altarpiece is executed in the Perugian school, while a painting of the Blessed Virgin of the Rosary is by Nucci, and another depicting the Madonna is by Batoni.

Near Pascelupo stands the former abbey of Saints Bartolomeo and Emiliano in Congiuntoli, noted for its imposing façade.

=== Other cultural heritage ===
The Torre Civica dates to the 14th century and is the only surviving gate of the former castle of Luceoli, constructed at the beginning of the 11th century.

=== Archeology ===
In the vicinity of Scheggia, on the slopes of Monte Petrara, stood the Temple of Jupiter Apenninus, an important religious site for the Umbrian peoples. Here were discovered the Eugubine Tables, regarded as a major monument of Italic antiquity. Although numerous archaeological discoveries have been made in the territory, no remains of the temple survive.

Numerous archaeological finds have been made in the area, including a finely crafted bronze idol, fragments of a large column, a bronze eagle, inscriptions (including a votive one), as well as mosaics, coins, marble basins, statues, and busts. Nearby are also visible the remains of ancient monumental buildings and a spring believed to have supplied water to the former settlement.
