= Palazzo dei Consoli =

Civic building in Gubbio, Italy (built 1332–1349)

Coordinates: 43°21′12″N 12°34′42″E

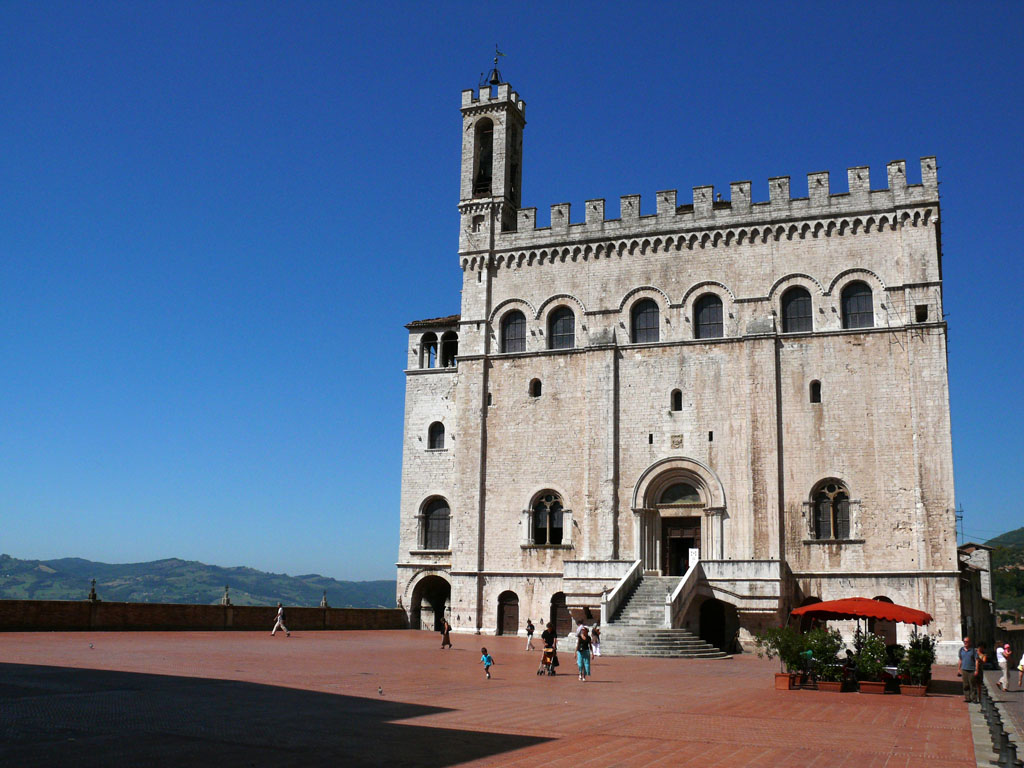
Facade of Palazzo dei Consoli seen from the square

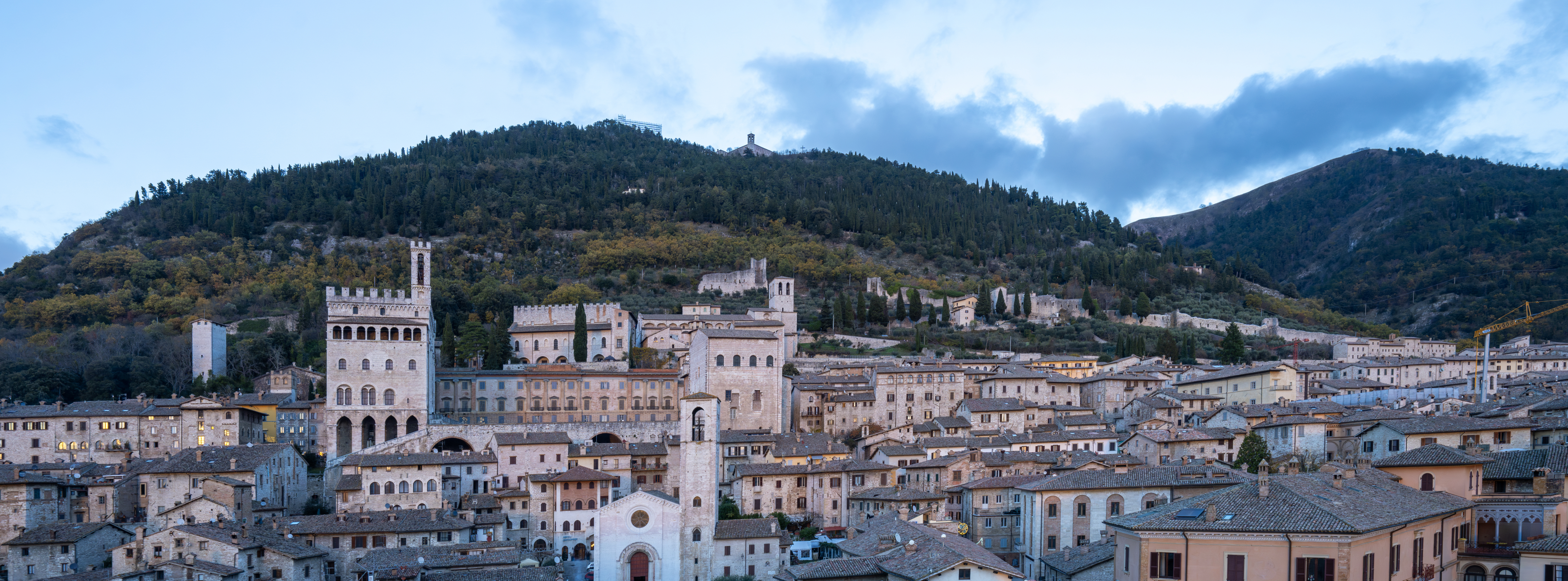
Palace seen from the town below

The Palazzo dei Consoli (Palace of the Consuls) is a Gothic architecture, civic building in the historic centre of Gubbio, region of Umbria, Italy. Construction took place during 1332–1349 under the design by Angelo da Orvieto; the palace was built on a large platform against the hillside and looming over the town below.

== History ==
The palace has a square plan and sits above a terrace corresponding to the building's lower floors. Across the piazza is the Palazzo Pretorio, Gubbio, meant to house a prefecture for the town. The present structures are a jarring mix of baroque (red brick L-shaped palace to the North) and the unfinished 14th-century taller white stone building with asymmetric doors and windows. It is asserted that both the Consoli and Pretorio palaces were designed by the same architect.

To the North of the Piazza Grande is the massive Neoclassical, brick Palazzo Ranghiasci-Brancaleoni, now a hotel.

Lucarelli documents that construction costs for the palace based on municipal documents totalled 16,336 Lire from Ravenna, which in 1888 the author calculated was the equivalent of 643 thousand Italian Lira.

The façade on the square is made with white limestone, now tinted with age. Pilasters (shallow buttresses) divide the first-floor facade into thirds. The ground floor has a central massive round-arched portal flanked with mullioned windows. In the upper part of the facade, the windows are placed in couples separated by lesenes. Above them are the merlons, supported by a frieze of ogival arches. A square campanile and a narrow loggia facing the town and valley to the South, rising nearly 100 meters from the ground.

The entrance portal is accessed by an elegant arched stone staircase from the grand plaza to the arengo, a big hall with barrel vaults that, in the communal age, housed the citizens' meeting. A hemi-circle (fan shape) of stone stairs leads to the solid stone bridge staircase, that leads up to a balcony overlooking the square. The pillars at the base of the arch have a four mountain symbol, surmounted by an iron lily, a heraldic symbol of Gubbio also seen in the fountain before the Palazzo del Bargello down Via de Consoli street.

== Interior ==
The tall barrel-vaulted main hall with high ceilings and stone walls is now lined by the exhibits of the civic museum which includes both archeologic and medieval art and artefacts from Gubbio. This hall is described as the Lapidario and collects inscriptions, sculpted architectural decoration, and heraldic symbols, detached from their former location, sometimes during reconstructions or demolitions. Some inscriptions date from Ancient Roman times, including one celebrating a local magistrate Gneo Satrio Rufo. An ancient decorated Roman marble sarcophagus is on display.

Among the most treasured items in the museum are the bronze Iguvine Tablets, written in an Umbrian language that predates Latin. The museum also has numismatic, ceramic (mainly maiolica), a pinacoteca with a 14th-century painted crucifix by the Master of the Gubbio Cross, a gonfalone by Sinibaldo Ibi, and a 1527 canvas depicting the Immaculate Conception by Francesco Signorelli. It also displays a large fresco (circa 1350) depicting the Madonna and child with St John the Baptist and St Ubaldo, attributed to Guiduccio Palmerucci and Mello da Gubbio.

Another feature displayed in the castle is an iron cage which was once used for public humiliation of robbers and criminals.

== Sources ==
- Touring Club Italiano-La Biblioteca di Repubblica, L'Italia: Umbria. Touring editore. 2004.
