= Iguvine Tablets =

Bronze tables containing inscriptions in Italic languages

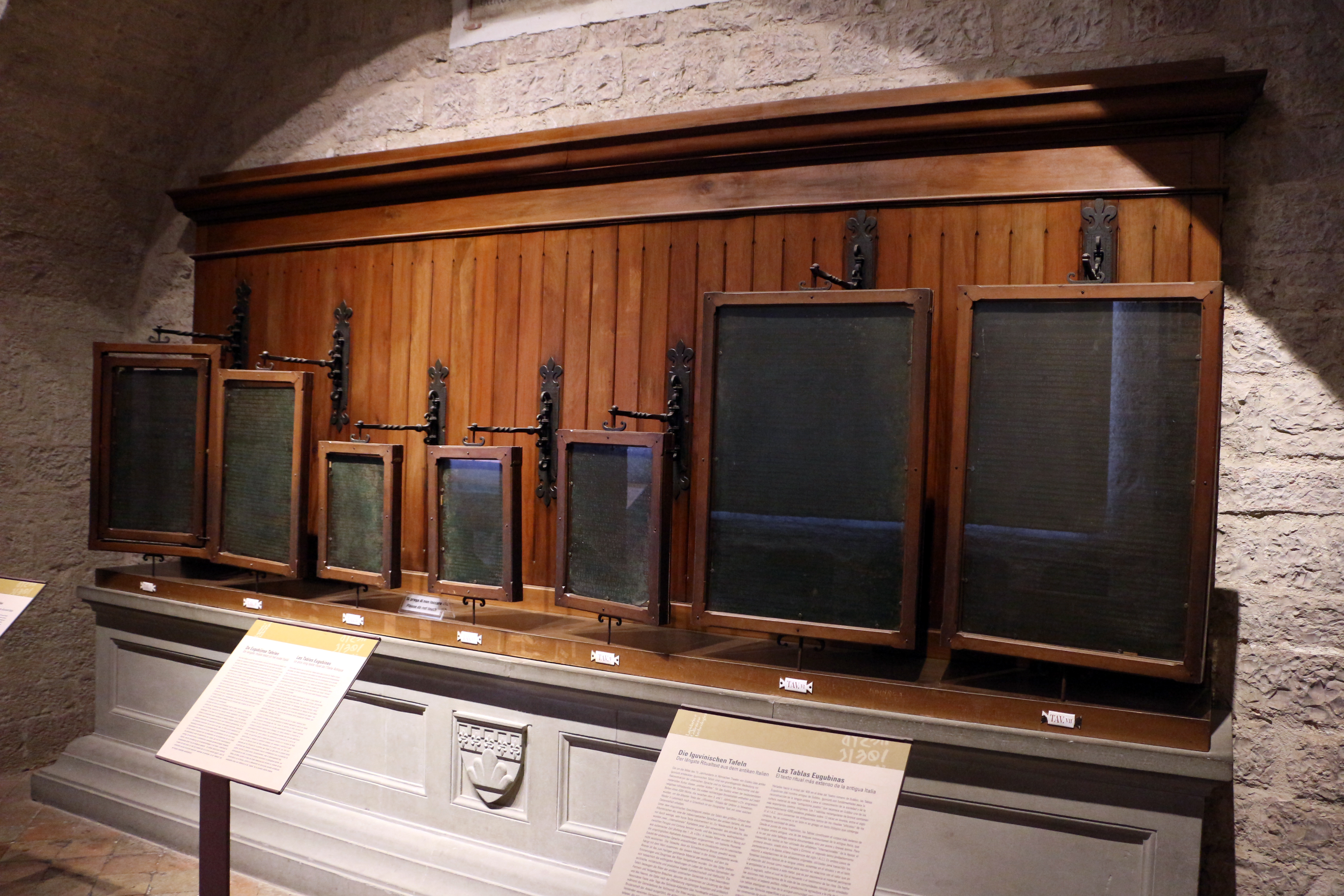
The seven Iguvine Tablets

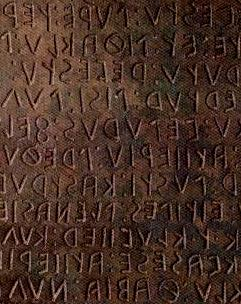
Detail on one of the tablets.

The Iguvine Tablets, also known as the Eugubian Tablets or Eugubine Tables, are a series of seven bronze tablets from ancient Iguvium (modern Gubbio, Italy), written in the ancient Italic language Umbrian. The earliest tablets, written in the native Umbrian alphabet, were probably produced in the 3rd century BC, and the latest, written in the Latin alphabet, from the 1st century BC. The tablets contain religious inscriptions that memorialize the acts and rites of the Atiedian Brethren, a group of 12 priests of Jupiter with important municipal functions at Iguvium. The religious structure present in the tablets resembles that of the early stage of Roman religion, reflecting the Roman archaic triad and the group of gods more strictly related to Jupiter. Discovered in a farmer's field near Scheggia in the year 1444, they are currently housed in the Civic Museum of the Palazzo dei Consoli in Gubbio. The tablets are the longest document of any of the Osco-Umbrian group of languages, which are closely related to Latin. The tablets shed light on the grammar of the language, and also on the religious practices of the ancient peoples of Italy, including the archaic religion of the Romans. Parts of tablets VI and VII appear to be written in an accentual metre, similar to the Saturnian metre that is encountered in the earliest Latin poetry.

The complete text, together with a translation into Latin, was published in 1849 by Aufrecht and Kirkhoff, in London in 1863 by Francis Newman, and in 1931 by Albrecht von Blumenthal. G. Devoto's edition dates from 1948. James W. Poultney published The Bronze Tables of Iguvium in 1959 (which received the Goodwin Award in 1961), which included English translations along with notes, a glossary, etc. Although the general meaning of the tablets is clear, there are still some debated points and issues. The main difficulty in understanding the text is insufficient knowledge of Umbrian vocabulary.

These are the only documents with details of sacred rituals from the ancient religions of Europe which have survived in an almost complete state. Moreover, their content deals with the rituals (sacrifices and prayers) addressed to the highest gods of the local community and to some extent may reflect the common religious beliefs and practices of the Italic peoples.

The modern Festival of Ceri, celebrated every year in Gubbio on May 15 in honor of Bishop Ubald or Ubaldo of Gubbio (1084–1160), shares certain features with the rites described in the text and so may be a survival of that ancient pre-Christian custom. It is also celebrated in Jessup, Pennsylvania, a town with a large number of immigrants from the Gubbio area, as Saint Ubaldo Day.

== Discovery ==
There are two versions of the discovery of the tablets. The first one says that a farmer found them in a field near Scheggia in 1444. After his death, his son-in-law with his wife and his sister-in-law sold them to the city of Gubbio with a notarial deed on 25 August 1456 for two years' worth of farming rights. Since Scheggia was the site of the temple of Jupiter Apenninus, an important Umbrian sanctuary, it is conceivable that the plates were kept in the temple itself. The second version, first attested in the 17th century, states that the tablets were found in a basement of the Roman theater in Gubbio. However, given that all the actors involved in the sale of the tablets were natives of Scheggia, that the tradition of finding them in Scheggia has been attested in Scheggia itself since at least the early 1600s, and that the sources of the Gubbio find at the same time attested that the tablets were originally nine and that two of them, loaned to Venice, were never returned (which is patently false), it is likely that the latter version of the Gubbio find has a chauvinistic origin.

== Decipherment ==
The content of the tablets concerns the religions and ceremonies that were celebrated at Iguvium, the town's religious organization and its boundaries.

The first attempt at deciphering their meaning was made by Bernardino Baldi in the beginning of the 17th century, and he was followed by Adriaan van Schrieck, who believed the tablets were in the Low German language, and interpreted them accordingly. Olivieri recognized the name of Eugubium in one frequently recurring word. Louis Bourget pointed out that one of the tablets written in the Etruscan letters corresponded with two written in Roman letters. Karl Otfried Müller, in Die Etrusker, showed that in spite of the use of Etruscan letters, the language of the inscriptions was different from the Etruscan language. Lepsius added to the epigraphical criticism of the tablets, and Lassen and Grotefend made several successful attempts at interpretation. Aufrecht and Kirchhoff, working off of their predecessors and under the scientific method, created a refined interpretation.

The understanding of this text has been a key component in making progress in the decipherment of another ritual text, the Etruscan Liber Linteus.

== Epigraphic note ==
The tablets are engraved on bronze. Analysis of the external appearance of the supporting material has led scholars to conclude that only tablets V, VI and VII were meant to be exposed in public. The other ones were cast as an archive document. They are inscribed in Italic alphabet derived from Etruscan (T. I to Vb 8) and in Latin alphabet (T. Vb 9 onwards, VI, VII).

== Date ==
The study of the ductus (writing style), conducted by comparing the tablets with other inscriptions from the area of Central Italy, has allowed scholars to conclude that they date from no later than the end of the 3rd century for T. III and IV to the first half of the 1st century for the latest T. VI and VII.

== Content ==
Tablets I to V present their topic in a concise, matter of fact manner. Tablets VI and VII repeat the same subject as Tablet I in a much more detailed and diluted way, with apparent literary and encomiastic intentions and overtones. The content of the tablets is given below, in their relative order of antiquity as established by Newman on the authority of Aufrecht and Kirchhoff, which is identical to that recently indicated by A. Maggiani.

=== Tablet I ===
==== Side A ====
Six triplet sacrifices to the Grabovian triad and the minor triad:

After observing the birds before and the behind, three oxen are sacrificed to Iove Grabovius before (without) the Trebulana Gate. Behind (within) it three sows are sacrificed to Trebus Iovio.

Before the Tesenaca Gate three oxen are sacrificed to Marte Grabovie. Behind it three pigs are sacrificed to Fisus Sancius. A libation ensues.

Before the Vehiia Gate three white fronted oxen are sacrificed to Vofione Grabovie. Behind the Gate three ewe lambs are sacrificed to Tefre Iovie. After the profanation of the lambs, the rump is offered in expiation and a libation for the tota, local community, ensues, on the two sides separately starting with the right side. After the profanation of the rumps is over the backs shall be profanated.

==== Side B ====
Two more triplet sacrifices to Marte Hodie and Hondos Çerfios in atonement for the citadel:

At the Jovian grove after the shearing of sheep three male calves shall be sacrificed to Marte Hodie for the Iguvine people and tota.

At the Coreties (Quiritius or Curiatius) grove three male calves shall be sacrificed to Hontos Çerfios.

Henceforth the citadel will be expiated. If any anything vicious happened in the discharge of the rite the birds shall be observed, the rite shall be reinstated once again after returning to the Trebulana Gate.

Review of the city militia and expulsion (extermination) of the traditional enemies of Iguvium (Tadinates, Etruscans, Nahartes, Iapuzcoi) by the arfertur and the two prinovatus (augures or their attendants):

- Tadinates (tařinate(m)), refers to the Umbrians from Gualdo Tadino;
- Tusci (tursku(m)) refers to the Etruscans, with the possible meaning in Umbrian of boundary;
- Nahartes (Naharku(m)), refers to the Umbrians from around the Nera valley in southeastern Umbria, from Nahar the ancient name of the river Nera. According to another interpretation, it refers to the Sabines east of Nahar/Nera river.
- Iapuzcoi (Iapuzku(m), a tribe of unclear origin, on which there are various hypotheses: a people of the Adriatic side near Picentes at the borders with the Umbrians, Iapygians of southeastern Italy, or the Iapydes of Illyria. The first hypothesis is the most plausible.

Four more triplet sacrifices:

Near the small fontains three red boars shall be sacrificed to Çerfos Martios.

On the Rubinian ager three she boars shall be sacrificed to Prestata Çerfia of Çerfos Martios. The sacred jugs, black and white, shall there be ordered and turned.

Beyond the Sahata (Sahata is probably the area considered within the pomerium, possibly marked by a stream) three she calves shall be sacrificed to Tursa Çerfia of Çerfios Martios.

The assignation of the place where to carry out the slaughter of the boars shall be decided according to the site upon which the officiant is watching, whether either behind on the Rubina or beyond on the Sahata.

Three days later the people shall be assembled and three heifers sacrificed below the Forum of Sehemania (Semonia) to Tursa Iovia at Acedonia. One of the heifers shall be consecrated by the arfertur and two by the prinovatus.

=== Tablet II ===
==== Side A (B of Lepsius) ====
(Lacuna at the beginning of the text).

Sacrifice of an ox to Iove Patre, of a ram to Iovio? (Iuno according to Newman), of a lamb to Iovio (Iuno) and of a boar to Marte.

The Hondia (elements that pertain to ritual sacrifice to Hondus, an earth deity)

Preparations made by the arfertur: readying of the victim(s), grains, strues, fertum; incense or meal, wine; salt, mola; mandraculum (white linen used to wrap the officiant's hand), vases; pure water; ignition of the fire at the ara. Petronian Feast to Hontos Iovios: sacrifice to Hontos Iovios of puppies, offers of wine, libation, partition of the meats and their exposition on a board. Holding and turning of the ara with the hands and offer of wine. Division of the wine, the strues and ferctum, the meats among the participants. Burning (or inhumation) of the puppies at the ara.

==== Side B (A of Lepsius) ====
Sacrifice and feast of the Attidian Brotherhood:

Sacrifice of a pig and a ram to Iove at the time of the decuriae of month Semonius by the ten sets of families of each of the 12 regions. Sacred Epulum (feast) in honour of Iove Patre, started in town and profanated at the various fana with libations using the mandraculum.

Vocian (Buck: Lucian) Feast to Iupater:

Sacrifice of a calf to Iove Patre for the Vocian (Lucian?) gens of the Attidians. The sacrifice is conducted with the urfeta in one hand at the offering and the crencatro (augural implement comparable to the lituum but crossed (Newman), or toga wore slanted across the right shoulder (Buck)) in the right hand at the time of the slaughtering.

=== Tablets III and IV ===
Sacrifice to Puemonos Popricos and Vesuna.

General prescriptions concerning the holding of the sacrifice, sacrifice of the ovis (lamb) to Puemonos and Vesuna near a sacred grove. Containing details on the choice of the ohtur (auctor, head, perhaps augur) of the ceremony, the dispositions of the ritual instruments, the ritual invocations for the safety of the city to Iove Patre and Puemonos, the distribution of the sacrificial meat and the libations.

=== Tablet V ===
==== Side A ====
Duties of the arsfertur:

The arsfertur must provide whatever is essential for the ceremony and select the victims.

Fees to be levied for the performance of the rites.

Whenever the banquet of the brotherhood takes place, the fratreks or the cvestor must put to votes whether the banquet was properly arranged. If the majority of those present think it was not, a further vote must be taken to fix the penalty for the arsfertur.

==== Side B ====
Contributions to be made by two gentes to the brethren, and portions of flesh to be awarded them by the brethren on the decurial festival.

=== Tablet VI and VII ===
These two tablets repeat the content of tablet I while expanding it to include and expound the minutest details of the rituals. See below for a sample text and translation of part of tablet six.

==== VI Side A ====
Lustration of the arx

Introductory auspices: as in I the sacrifice is to be preceded by the taking of the auspices. Formulae passed between the augur and the arfertur (legum dictio); warning against noises, interruptions, meddling; boundaries of the augural templum; formulae of announcement of the auspices (conspectio, nuntiatio); prescriptions applying to the ensuing sacrifice concerning the military rod (pirsca arsmatia), the disposition of the pots and the fire.

1. Sacrifice of three oxen to Iove Grabovios before the Trebulan gate. An opening prayer is followed by three long prayers in identical words for each of the three offerings to the three Grabovian gods and these by a general prayer in conclusion. Then follow prayers especially devoted to the rites connected with the sacrifice.
2. Sacrifice of three pregnant sows to Trebos Iovios behind the Trebulan gate: the prayers used in the first sacrifice are to be repeated.

==== Side B ====
1. Sacrifice of three oxen to Marte Grabovios before the Tesenaca gate. The prayers of the first sacrifice are to be repeated.
2. Sacrifice of three suckling pigs to Fisus Sancius behind the Tesenaca gate. The prayers of the first sacrifice are to be repeated. Then an offering of cakes accompanied by specific prayers and ceremonies ensues (involving the use of the mandraculum, white linen cloth wrapping the right hand of the officiant): special attention is given to Fisus Sancius, patron of the citadel (ocre Fisia).
3. Sacrifice of three oxen with a white forehead (calersuf) to Vofionos Grabovios before the Vehia gate. The prayers of the first sacrifice are to be repeated.
4. Sacrifice of three she lambs to Tefer Iovios behind the Vehia gate. The prayers of the first sacrifice are to be repeated. Then supplementary offerings follow, thereafter prayers and accompanying rites with vases on both sides of a trench.
5. Sacrifice of three bull calves to Marte Horse at the Iovian grove. The prayers of the first sacrifice are to be repeated.
6. Sacrifice of other three bull calves to Hondos Çerfios at the Coredian grove. The prayers of the first sacrifice are to be repeated.

Rites for the lustration of the poplo (people, i. e. city militia) and execration of the enemies:

The auspices are to be taken in the same way as for the lustration of the arx. Holding the perca arsmatia (ritual staff) and the cringatro the arsfertur lights the fire then with the two assistants (prinovatus), who hold rods of pomegranate wood, marches with the victims along the Augural Way to the district of Acedonia. Proclamation is made expelling the alien enemies. The Iguvines are ordered to form in companies. The arsfertur and the assistants march about them thrice with the victims and the fire. At the end a prayer is made invoking misfortune upon the aliens and blessings upon the Iguvinians.

==== VII Side a ====
Sacrifice of three boars to Çerfios Martios at the Fontuli, accompanied by the prayers used at the Trebulan gate.

Sacrifice of three sows to Praestita Çerfia at Rubinia, with the prayers used at the Trebulan gate. Ceremonies with the black vessels and the white vessels, the former meant to bring misfortune to the aliens, the latter to avert it from the Iguvinians. Offering to Fisovius Sancius with the prayersw used behind the Tesenaca gate.

Sacrifice of three female calves beyond the Sahata to Tursa Çerfia of the Çerfios of Marte. The prayers used at the Trebulan gate are to be repeated. The profanation of the offerings must take place where the nuntiatio happened: either in Rubinia or beyond the Sahata.

After three days the holder of the perca arsmatia and the two assistants pray silently for the execration of the enemies and the safety of Iguvium from the shrine of Tursa. Then heifers are set free below the Forum of Sehemenia: the first person who has caught any of the first three shall sacrifice them to Tursa Iovia at Aceronia for Iguvium. The prayers and rituals (offer of cereals, strues, fertum, persea) used at the Trebulan gate are to be repeated.

==== Side b ====
Obligations of the fratrexs and entity of the fine he must pay in case of omissions (300 asses).

== The religion of the Umbrians as reflected in the Iguvine Tablets ==
=== The triad of the Grabovii ===
The triad of the Grabovii is the highest group of deities of the Iguvian pantheon and looks to be strictly aligned with the archaic triad of Roman religion. The epithet Grabovius seems to be related to Etruscan crapis, ceremonial litter, which might derive from a word meaning oakwood.

The triad is composed by Iove or Iove Patre, Marte and Vofionos. The identity of the last has been understood as corresponding to Roman gods Quirinus or Liber, the latter from an IE root *h_{1}leudh- meaning people, either directly from the Italic theonym Loifer or through the intermediary of the Italic or Etruscan interpretation of Greek god (Dionysos) Eleutheros, recorded also in the Etruscan theonym Tin Luth (=Iuppiter Liber) of the Piacenza Liver.

The gods of the triad of the Grabovii receive in sacrifice three oxen (buf) outside the three town gates (Preveres Treblanes, Tesenaces, Vehiies before the Trebulan, Tesenacan, Vehiian Gate). Those to be offered to Vofionos are qualified as calersu, probably correspondent in meaning to Latin callidus, with a white forehead.

=== The minor triad ===
The gods of this triad receive sacrifices in correspondence with those of the major one but these gods are honoured within the town gates. Trebos Iovios corresponds to Iove Grabovios, Fisus Sancius to Marte Grabovios and Tefer Iovios to Vofionos Grabovios. They received sacrifices of three pregnant sows, three suckling pigs and three ewe lambs respectively. Only the identity of the second one is known with any degree of certainty from attestations of his existence in Rome and elsewhere in Italy. In Rome he is known as Semo Sancus Dius Fidius. It is odd that he is here associated with Mars while his association with Jupiter would seem more well grounded theologically. The topic has been the object of a study by Dominique Briquel: he opines the reason should lie in the repressive and henceforth military connotation of the notion of divine sanction of the law. This aspect is particularly relevant as to the divine sanction of the town wall, a fact which is of primary concern in the content of the Tablets.

Trebos in Trebos Iovios is usually understood as corresponding in meaning to Latin trabs, ridge of the roof. Tefer of Tefer Iovios is often explained as burner, from the Indo-European root *tep- ("warmth, "heat"). This interpretation though is very debated.

Both Benveniste and Dumézil have argued that the Iguvine triads are just another testimony of their three functional hypothesis of IE religion. In particular the sacrificial offerings roughly correspond to those of Rome in their three functional significance and the sixfold invocations of VIa 30 and 39, VIb 13 and 32 (nerf, arsmo; veiro, peiquo; castruo, fri: princes, priests; men, cattle; fields, land produce) show a direct connection to the sovereign, military and productive activities.

=== Other deities ===
==== Hondos Iovios ====
Many scholars, from Bücheler to Prosdocimi, opine this deity is an underworld god of agricultural fertility and plenty on the grounds of the sacrifice of puppies he receives at his festival. Prosdocimi calls it the intermestruae cereales: the declaration of the dog is set at the climax of the feriae. Jörg Rüpke remarks the association of Hondos with Jupiter is one among the numerous in the tablets, in which a complex multilevel and hierarchic structure of relationship among theonyms is envisaged. This phenomenon would put the god into a sort of host–guest relationship with the one given in the attributive. In the case of Hondos this feature is apparent also in the fact that his cults at the Hondia festival take place in the Jovian Grove but those at the lustration of the citadel (when the god bears the epithet of Çerfios) in the Coredian Grove.

It has been suggested that the theonym Hunte Çefi (Honde Serfi), referring to a chthonic god, derives from the Proto-Indo-European root *ǵʰōm-to 'earth', a stem attested in several branches.

==== Çerfos Martios, Praesta(o)ta Çerfia, Tursa Çerfia, Tursa Iovia ====
These deities are invoked and receive sacrifices aimed at obtaining their favor for the protection of the arx itself, of the community and of the fields in connection to the lustration rites of the Iguvian citadel at different locations of augural relevance. The rites concerning the Praestota and the two Tursae involve a complex of libations aimed at obtaining a twofold action: the safety for the Iguvine community and the offsetting and expulsion of its traditional enemies.

According to the archaeologist Olivier de Cazanove, the name Prestota may etymologically mean something akin to "the one who protects." Another interpretation, posited by the philologist Michael Weiss, opts to translate the theonym as "the one stationed in front." Poultney suggests that the name could reflect a preform *prai-stə-tā or *prai-stā-tā, whereas the linguist Nicholas Zair maintains that the term instead continues a pre-form *-statā. More broadly, the name may be phylogenetically related to Latin stō ("to stand"). Within the Iguvine tablets, the goddess Prestota is invoked to defend the Iguvine community from all evil and to instead inflict such misfortune upon another enemy settlement. It is perhaps possible that the goddess Prestota corresponds to the theonym Praestita mentioned on an inscription from Aquila. Arnobius, a 3rd-century Christian writer, mentions a deity named Praestana who supposedly named as such "because, in throwing the javelin, Quirinus excelled all in strength." Other possible comparisons with Roman religion perhaps derive from Iuppiter Praestes, Iuppiter Praestitus, Iuppiter Praestabilis, and the Lares Praestites. Ovid, in his Fasti, claims that the epithet Praestites was applied to the Lares as they "stand for us, and preside over the city walls, and they are present and bring us aid." Moreover, Umbrian Prestota is possibly connected to the Oscan goddess anterstataí, a deity mentioned on the Agnone Tablet. Praestota is also associated with a ritualistic sacrifice of three red or black pigs, a ceremony that—according to James Wilson Poultney—implies the goddess bore chthonic characteristics.

Tursa corresponds to the god Terminus, being the deity that represents the boundaries of the city at different locations of augural relevance: these are without and within the city for Tursa Çerfia and Tursa Iovia respectively (TI I b; VII a). Such a meaning is connected to the Umbrian word for border, tuder: Tursa is written Tuda in the Etruscan tablets, the intervocalic d being pronounced as a weak rs (i.e.: ḍ). Dumézil on the other hand, on the grounds of the function of Tursa, a deity whose action is to scare, inspire terror into the enemies, opines the theonym derives from a verbal root equivalent to Latin terreō, which means "to scare" (interpreting accordingly tursitu, tremitu in VIb 60). De Vaan suggests that the name Tursa derives from Proto-Italic *torsā ("fright"), itself perhaps from Proto-Indo-European *tres-.

There is no agreement among scholars on the meaning of the epithet Çerfios and as to whether this is also a theonym, i. e. Çerfos Martios is a god different from Mars or not. An inscription from Corfinium reads: Çerfom sacaracicer Semunes sua[d, "priest of the Çerfi and the Semones", placing side by side the two categories of entities, the çerfi and the semunes. Çerfos is most times associated to IE root *ker(s) and Latin theonyms Ceres and Cerus. This view though might create interpretative problems concerning the theology of Mars and of the two deities who in Rome are associated with the sphere of law and defence, i. e. gods Jupiter and Semo Sancus Dius Fidius. Georg Wissowa and Dumézil both underline that the derivation from root *ker(s) is not certain: Umbrian group -rf could have a different origin than -rs. It is possible that Prestota embodies the protective powers of this god Çerfos, whereas Turs represents his more belligerent capacities and the concurrent terror wrought upon others.

==== Marte Hodie; Hondos Çerfios ====
Marte and Hondos appear also under these epithets. Here too the only certain indication is from Roman Heres (or Here) Martea, connected with heres, he who inherits and also dominus, the position of master of the house. Some scholars though connect the epithet to Latin adjective fodius, he who destroys. The two gods both receive sacrifices of male calves in the rites for the lustration of the citadel at the Iovian and Coredian groves respectively; theirs are the last in the series of sacrifices after the two triads and before the execration of the enemies.

God Hondos receives the epithet Iovios in II and that of Çerfios in VI. This fact raises the question of whether these epithets were used alternatively in connection with local or temporal constraints. Another similar instance is that of Tursa Çerfia and Tursa Iovia, who are found without and within the pomerium respectively.

==== Puemonos Pupricos and Vesuna of Puemonos Pupricos ====
This divine couple appears only in tablets III and IV, the most ancient ones. Puemonos's name seems to be related with Roman goddess Pomona; moreover both the name itself and the epithet Popricos (Publicus) hint towards a universal fertility god, similar to Latin god Liber. Vesuna is also found on a coin from Marsian territory.

=== General remarks on Iguvinian theonyms ===
O. de Cazanove observes Iguvinian theonyms appear to be compound formations of two, three and four terms: they may consist of a substantive plus an epithet (e. g. Hondos Iovios, Tursa Iovia, Puemonos Podpricos), of a substantive plus a possessive phrase plus epithet (e. g. Vesuna of Puemonos Podpricos) and of a substantive plus epithet plus possessive phrase plus epithet (e. g. Prestota Çerfia of Çerfios Martios, Tursa Çerfia of Çerfios Martios). In his view this situation is comparable to that of Rome where are recorded purely functional deities in the pontifical books. These divinities were invoked in the prayers according to the Roman rite as mentioned by Gellius: "Lua Saturni, Salacia Neptuni, Hora Quirini, Virites Quirini, Maia Vulcani, Heries Iunonis, Moles Martis, Nerio Martis". These entities would be a concrete representation of the powers of their respective god.

At Iguvium though the situation looks more complex and less fixed as Tursa and Hondos are alternatively Çerfian and Martian and Çerfian and Iovian respectively.

==== Other theonyms ====
Some other deities are known just because they are mentioned occasionally in specifying the limits of augural observation (included those of the town). These theonyms are for the most part known in Roman religion. They are Tursa and (possibly) Hulos in IV 17 and 19 respectively, Vestisios (Libasius) apparently god of libations (possibly related to Latin Vesta ), Hoios (cf. Latin Holus, Helus, Roman grove of Helernus in Ovid's Fasti II 67-68) god of vegetation and Padella (cf. Roman goddess Patella), goddess of opening sheaves in VIa 14. Possibly adjective deueia of Asa Deueia (VIa 9, 10) implies a cult of the sky under the name Dius, Dia, similar to that of Dea Dia outside Rome (Ancillotti & Cerri).

=== Priesthoods ===
The Attidian brethren had an arsfertur (literally the Umbrian equivalent of Latin adfertor, i. e. "he who carries something to somewhere", clearly referring to a role in the ceremonies, holder of the pirca arsmatia, ceremonial rod). Other mentioned offices include the fratrecs interpreted as curator arcae, the cvestor and the prinovatus, probably agrimensors, attendants of the person who takes the auspices. An ohtor (auctor) is mentioned in T. III and IV: the term denotes the person responsible for the ceremony.

=== Rites ===
The tablets record different sets of rites held on different festive occasions: the main and recorded in greatest detail one is the annual lustration of the citadel (ocre, Latin arx) of Iguvium (Tablets I, VI and VII). This rite includes sacrifices to the Grabovian (major) triad and the minor one near the gates of the town, sacrifices to Marte Hodie and Hondos Çerfios at the two sacred groves of Iove and Coredios (interpreted as Quiritius or Curiatius) respectively, the lustral review of the people of Iguvium in arms, i. e. the city militia, the execration and ritual expulsion (exterminatio) of the traditional enemies of Iguvium and final sacrifices to Çerfios Marti(os), the Praestita Çerfia and the two Tursae, Çerfia and Iovia, at various locations without and within the pomerium. Tablets VI and VII relate the ritual actions such as circumambulations, libations, kneelings and dance in minute detail recording all the prayers and the other augural formulae. The older tablet I gives a more concise record.

The ritual triple (three time) circumambulation with fire and the victims about the city militia looks parallel to the Roman ritual performed by king Tullius as described by Dionysius of Halicarnassus.

The most complex ceremonies are those concerning Tefer Iovios and Fisus Sancius. A summary is appended below.

==== Tefer Iovios (VIb 22-42) ====
Sacrifice of the ewe lambs with the usual prayers used for each god of the two triads.

(23) Offering of the persondro sorsom (suine) at the right foot of the gate with accompanying libation.
(24) Offering of the libations.
(25-36) Prayer to Tefer Iovios with tripodium.

(37) Offering of the persondro staflare (bovine or ovine) at the left foot of the gate.
Prayer repeated.

(38) Assigning of the prosecta (cuts of sacrificial meat).
Assigning of the libation accompanying the persondro sorsale at the right foot where the sorso was offered to the god (profanated).
Assigning of the libation accompanying the persondro staflare at the left foot as above.

Burning or inhumation of the persondro sorsale.
Burning or inhumation of the persondro staflare.

(40) Throwing away over the head the vessels used for the persondro during the prayer on the incense (or cereal meal).

==== Fisus Sancius (VIb 3-18) ====
It is perhaps possible that the Fisovius Sancius and the Fisus Sancius described in the text are the same beings, though—according to Poultney—the exact relationship between these two entities is unclear.

Sacrifice of three suckling piglets with the usual prayers, consecration with incense (or meal) and grains as at the Trebulan gate.
Wearing of the mandraculum (white cloth) around the right hand by the officiant.
Adding of the ficla and strucla to the prosecta.
Placing of the sopo (offa) at the back.

(5) The officiant while kneeling offers the libation, the mefa and the spefa spilling them from the vessels.
(6) Prayers for the arx and the community.
(16) During the prayers libation and tripodium.
Offering of the libation.
Distribution of the prosecta and of the libation while kneeling.

(17) Crushing and spilling over the fire of the mefa, libation, sopa (possibly lower entrails).
Milling while sitting, prayer over the milled incense or meal.

(18) The two profane and the two sacred jugs are disposed in rows.

==== Tablet II ====
The opening lines (1-14) of Tablet II records various sacrifices to Iove, Iovio (or Iovia? Newman: Iuno) and Marte to be held in atonement of possible unknown ritual faults:

The Hondia festivals on which occasion dogs were offered in sacrifice to Hondos Iovios—apparently "Earthly Zeus" or "CHTHONIC Zeus"; the feast to Hondos Iovios held by the gens Petronia (these last two festivals might in fact be one); the sacrifice and feast of the sodalitas of the Fratres Atiedii on which rams and pigs were sacrificed to Iove by the ten sets of families of the twelfth pomperias, districts of Iguvium; finally the sacrifice of a calf at the feast of Iove Patre held by the gens Vocia (Lucia). The tablet might be fragmentary, i. e. record only the final part of a ritual at its beginning.

===== Festival of Hondos =====
Here is the summary of the ceremonies at the festival of Hondos with dog sacrifice (IIa 15-44) (oddly, in the following translation, katlu is translated both "kid" and "dog"):

(15) the sum of money for the kid(s) is to be raised among the dining tables at the published price
the arfertur makes preparations after observing the birds
(18) the kid(s), grains, strues, fertum; incense, wine, salt, mola; mandraculum, vases (consecrated and not or wet and dry), water (or ointment) are to be prepared

(the rite, proper, seems to begin here:)

(19)--the fire is lit on the ara (probably "altar")
the puni (incense) is consecrated

(20) offering of the kid(s) to Hondos Iovios, declaration of its purity, for the gens Patrona among the Atiedian Brotherhood
(22) the sopas (underparts?) of the kid are taken and the prosiciae (cutlets) divided upon the breadcrusts
(23) empty baskets are placed behind and the cereals before at the foot (of the ara)
offering of the incense

libation and tripodium

(25) tripodium near the vessels of wine chanting in turn nine times: "I honour Thee with incense and wine."

(26) bringing of the crusts with the entrails

(27) libation

two cuts of the kid(s) are divided into three pieces or three times

addition of strues and fertum

(29) offering of the dog
prayer over the [dog's] foot and over the uncut flesh

addition [of strues and fertum] to the flesh cuts

offering of the kid(s); prayer in front of it
prayer on the flesh, both uncut and roasted

offering of the suppa on the plates
prayer on the dedicatory jugs

(31) libation, tripodium, moving and placing down of the offerings

suppas are placed behind, the flesh is taken by hand
(33) the incense is placed in two jars on the bracket
breadcrusts, fried placentas, pots both containing water (ointment) and empty are brought over

(34) libation to Hondos Iovios from the jugs for the gens Petronia of the Attidian Brethren

beyond the bracket, prayer on the pure breadcrusts
same prayer on the placentae, the pure jugs filled with water and the empty ones on the bracket

(37) libation and tripodium

the bracket is moved aside; prayer on the pure water (ointment)
(38) hands are washed from the ara (or the ara is turned in the hands)
(39) back to the ara, near it silent prayer on the pure wine
(40) bringing and distribution of whatever the participants wish: wine, incense
(41) grinding of the strues, fertum; spilling of the incense or meal on the jar
(42) prayer on the whole and the ground grains

the rite is proclaimed over

(43) the kid(s) is burnt near the ara.

Sacrifices of dogs were not common among ancient Italic people. Instances in Rome include the Lupercalia and a parallel may be found in the Augurium Canarium and the Robigalia, both held in late Spring for the propitiation of a good harvest and for the preservation of the grains from mildew respectively. According to the explanation given in Ovid by the flamen Quirinalis the dog was sacrificed because at the time in which the grains in the ears are in danger from the heat and draught, the sun enters the constellation of the Dog: this explanation is erroneous. Another ritual aimed at protecting corn in danger from fires concerned foxes which were set afire in the Circus Maximus on the last day of the Cerialia (Cerealia). Finally dogs were crucified on the Capitol at the beginning of August, time of the canicula to avert the rabies contagion or lessen their barking which disturbed sick people.

The hymn has a fairly clear structure, with the central offering of the dog sacrifice and following prayer enveloped in sequence by offerings of strues and fertum, followed by two parallel offerings and prayers, and more distantly preceded and followed by two tripodia. Activities both before and after the formal period of the rite are specified. Prayers and libations are repetitively offered throughout, while consecrating and offering (presumably this involves lighting) of the incense is prominent near the beginning and ritual washing toward the end of the ceremony. According to the philologist Brent Vine, the offering of the struhçla and fikla cakes in the Iguvine tablets may parallel a similar ritual described Cato the Elder, in which there is also an offering of cakes ("strues" and "fertum") described as part of the ceremony, Moreover, Cato makes frequent use of third person imperative commands in the prayer for Mars, which parallels the extensive usage of imperative forms in Umbrian ritual language. According to the classicist Jay Fisher, it is possible that the Iguvine and Catonian passages reflects a common Central Italic tradition.

Tablet III and IV record in minute detail the rituals of the festival of Puemonos Popricos and Vesuna at a sacred grove outside the town. Recently Michael Weiss has advanced the view that this was a new year ritual on the grounds of comparative material.

=== Treatment of the offerings ===
Latin sources concerning the cooking of the viscera underline the difference between the Etruscan and Roman customs distinguishing the exta aulicocta boiled in the olla extaris before the offering to the god, from the Tuscan exta roasted in veru and partly eaten during the sacrificial rite. At Iguvium the description of some sacrificial rites documents both the use of spits for the viscera and the presence of prosiciae displayed on the table of the offerings beside the fire and perhaps consecrated and burnt to the gods.

== Augury ==
Augural practices are presented in the tablets, most notably in the last two ones. They include the praeire verba, i.e. the uttering of the words to be repeated by the arfertur, the legum dictio, the rules for the taking of the auspices such as silence (silentium) and the avoidance of other incidents, the definition of the boundaries of the augural templum, the nuntiatio, announcement of the appearance of the expected signs from birds, the circumambulation of the army with fire.

Tablet VIa begins with an augural song. Here below is the text (VIa 1-5) with Poultney's translation of the passage:

Este persclo aveis asseriater eneto:
parfa curnace dersua,
peiqu peica merstu.
Poei angla asseriato eest
esso tremnu, serse,
arsferture ehuelto:

"Stiplo asseriaia parfa dersua, curnaco dersua;
peico mersto, peica mersta;
mersta auei, mersta angla esona."

Arfertur eso anstiplatu:

"Ef asserio parfa dersua, curnaco dersua;
peico mersto, peica mersta;
mersta aueif merstaf anglaf esona;
mehe, tote Iioveine,
esmei stahmei stahmeitei."

Translation:

This ceremony [the adfertor--officiating priest] shall commence by observing the birds:
a parra (perhaps jay, green woodpecker or hoopoe) and crow in the west,
a (black) woodpecker and magpie in the east.
The one who goes out to observe the messengers (or 'signs')
while in the tent, seated,
shall call out to the adfertor:

"Demand that I observe a parra in the west, a crow in the west;
a woodpecker in the east, a magpie in the east;
in the east, birds; in the east,
divine messengers."

The adfertor shall thus demand:

"There observe a parra in the west, a crow in the west;
a woodpecker in the east, a magpie in the east;
in the east, birds; in the east, divine messengers;
for me, for the state of Iguvium,
for this established ordinance."

Rules for the observation of bird signs are given in VIa 15-18: below a certain boundary line (hondra esto tudero VIa 15) defined previously, the augur must see and hear the verse of a parfa (parrha) and a crow; above that line (supu) he must see and hear a woodpecker peiqu and a magpie peica.

=== Augural terminology ===
Aveis asseriates Ia 1; aves asseriates VIa 1: avibus observatis, "having observed the birds."

persnaies, pusnaies Ia 1: antici, postici, "(in the part) before and behind.

dersua VIa 1: dextera, "right hand, prosperous." The right hand was apparently seen as auspicious in Umbria as in Greece. Newman (Appendix II) cites the position of the augur in the inauguration of Numa, in which he faced east while Numa faced south. Right and left have both an auspicious and inauspicious meaning in Latin. One problem with this enticing analysis is that there is a distinct and separate word that means 'right (hand)' in Umbrian: destre/testre which is in the expected phonological form for a cognate of Latin dexter/dextra. Poultney suggests a possible relationship of Umbrian dersua to Latin dorsum 'back' since when oriented toward the rising sun, the west is to ones back.

merstu VIa 1: iustissimus, "rightest, most correct, propitious," superlative of mersos. Adjective mersos, from meḍos (literally medius), means iustus (cf. Oscan meddix: supreme magistrate, iudex). Both words in Latin and Osco-Umbrian have a broader meaning than just, lawful: they may mean augurally correct, favourable, in agreement with the divine forces. But here again, the Umbrian word that fits this analysis: mers "law, right, custom" which is likely from the PIE root *med- as in Greek medomai "to think on". Also, Umbrian formed superlatives with -emo-/-temo-, not with -sto. The context seems to call for a direction that contrasts with destrua above. As Poultney points out, the most probable source here is PIE *merk- "spark" with cognates in Germanic meaning 'morning' (including that word itself). The semantic shift for words for "morning/sunrise" to words for "east" is, of course, ubiquitous.

anglaf VIa 1: oscines, "giving signs through their voice." < *an-kla:-, compare Latin cla-mo "I cry (out)", cla-rus "famous"

stiplo, anstiplatu VIa 2, 3: stipulare, leges dicere, "stipulate."

mersta auei, mersta angla, esona VIa 3: "most propitious birds (auspices), most propitious singing, divine [signs]" or more likely "birds in the east, messengers in the east, divine [signs]" The last of these may refer to lightning, according to Poultney.

stahmei stahmeitei VIa 5: statio statuta, templum designatum, "augural templum," the designated space of augural observation.

neip mugatu VIa 6: ne mugito, muttito, "that nobody shall make utterances, murmur." Silence is essential in augural practises,

nep arsir andersistu VIa 6: ne divis intersistito, "that nobody shall come in between, barge in," between the divine (signs) and the augur.

disleralinsust VIa 7: alteravit (eṛali, erali=alter) "render irritual, impair the auspice"; attero VII a 11, 27: "bad, unlucky."

verfale VIa 8: formula of the templum. According to a new etymology, de Vaan connects this noun to Latin cognate urbs, both having the meaning of defined space for augural observation, from a PIE root *u(o)rb(h) plus /d(h)-h(2) enclosure, enclosed area. stahmito VIa 8: statutum, "designated, established."

tuderato VIa 8: finitum, "defined, provided with boundaries." From noun tuder boundary, Etruscan tular.

vapersus auiehcleir VIa 9: lapididibus auguralibus (ablative), "(near) by the augural stones, rocks." Note the change from *l- to v- in Umbrian, also seen in Umbrian vuco versus Latin locus

tuder VIa 9: "boundary, limit."

anclar VIa 16: oscines "songbirds, messengers", literally "those who call out" < *an-kla:- compare Latin clamo "I cry (out)"

combifiatu VIa 17: conspectum capito, nuntiato, "(the augur) shall announce the appearance of the auspices." Literally confidato "confide".

popler anferener VIa 19: populi recensendi, lustrandi, "review of the levied army." Buck cites the parallel instance of the ritual circumambulation holding a lit torch performed by king Tullus Hostilius in Dionysius of Halicarnassus Roman Antiquities IV 22.

perca arsmatia VIa 19: virga ritualis, "ritual (and/or military) rod."

perne postne sepse sarsite uouse auie esone VIb 11: antice postice septe sarcte voce (et) ave (i. e. auspicio) divina, "from before and behind, clear and cut (fully, wholly) voice and bird sacred." Or ...voto, augurio, sacrificio "by vow, auspice and sacrifice."

peiqu: picus "woodpecker"; peica perhaps "magpie;" parfa: parrha, perhaps oxifraga or "upupa/hoopoe"; curnace: cornix, "crow" (VIa 1 etc.).

prinovatus: legatus, assistant to the arsfertur, possibly agrimensor, land-surveyor: probably from Greek πρινος, Celtic prinni oakwood.

percaf poniçate Ib 15; perca poniçiater VIb 51: virgas Punicae-mali "rods," wands of pomegranate wood.

fato fito VIb 11: it looks fito had an active meaning in Umbrian, i.e. "(having) become"; fato has been interpreted as a passive past participle of a verb corresponding to Latin fateor, thence fato fito: having become defined by utterance.

== Topography ==
Studies have been devoted recently to identifying the location of the rituals described in the tablets, particularly of the Fisian Arx, which has been placed with certainty on Monte Ingino, to the southwest of Gubbio.

== Text samples ==
=== From Tablets III and IV ===
(3.1)esunu fuia herter sume ustite sestentasiaru urnasiaru

huntak vuke prumu pehatu
inuk uhturu urtes puntis frater ustentatu puře fratru mersus fust kumnakle
inuk uhtur vapeře kumnakle sistu

sakre uvem uhtur teitu puntes terkantur
inumek sakre uvem urtas putes fratrum upetuta
inumek via meruva arvamen etuta

erak pir persklu uřetu
sakre uvem kletra fertuta aituta

arve-n kletram amparitu
eruk esunu futu

kletre tuplak prumum antentu
inuk cihceřra ententu
inuk kazi ferime antentu
isunt feřetru antentu
isunt su-feřaklu antentu

seples ahensnes tris kazi astintu
feřetrus etres tris ahensnes astintu
su-feřaklu tuves ahesnes astintu

inenek vukum-en esunum-en etu
ap vuku kukehehs
iepi pesklum-ař kařitu

vuku pir ase astentu

sakre sevakne upetu
iuve-pater prumu ampentu testru sese asa
fartrus-per atiieřes
ahtis-per eikvasatis
tuta-pe iiuvina
trefi-per iiuvina
ticlu sevakni teitu

inumek uvem sevakni upetu
puemune pupřike apentu
ticlu sevakni naratu

iuka mersuva uvi-kum habetu
fartrus-pe atiieře
ahtis-per eikvasatis
tuta-per iiuvina
trefi-per iiuvina

sakre vatra ferine feitu
eruku aruvia feitu

uvem peřaem pelsanu feitu

erek tuva tefra spanti-mař pru-sekatu
eřek peřume puruvitu
strucla ař-veitu

inumek etrama spanti tuva tefra pru-sekatu
erek erecluma puemune pupřike (4.1) pur-tivutu
erarunt struhclas eskamitu a-veitu

inumek tertiama spanti triia tefra pru-sekatu
eřek supru:sese erecluma vesune puemunes pupřices pur-tuvitu
strucla petenata isek ař-veitu

erererunt kapiřus puemune vesune pur-tuvitu
asam-ař ereclum-ař
a-secetes karnus i-seceles
et vempesuntres supes sanes
pertentu persnimu ař-peltu statitu

veskles snates a-snates sevakne ereclum-a
persnimu puemune pupřike vesune puemunes pupřikes

clavles
persnihmu puemune pupřike vesune puemunes pupřikes ereclu

inuk ereclu umtu
putres-pe erus

inuk vesticia mefa purtupite skalceta
kunikaz apehtre esuf testru sese asa asama pur-tivutu
sevakne sukatu

Translation:

The ritual must be performed during the ordinary bimonthly ceremonies:

First, purify the earthen (jar) in the grove;
then,(by?) rising in groups of five, the brothers must elect an auctor in the assembly of brothers;
then, the auctor must sit on the stone in the assembly.

The auctor shall designate a piglet (or victim) and a sheep; the groups of five must inspect them;
when the groups of five have accepted the piglet and sheep (by?) rising,
they shall then go along the accustomed way to the field.

From there (or on the way), load the fire (with incense) with a prayer.
Carry the piglet and the sheep on a litter, (and) drive (it to the field).

In the field, set up the litter,
then (or where?) the sacrifice must take place.

First, attach a forked (branch) to the table,
then attach (or insert?) the lattice frame,
then make a roof above the whole table.
On this (table?), attach a beam(? or cutting board?);
on this, attach the small beam (? or under-board?).

Attach (this) to the roof with three bronze nails;
attach the beam (or cutting board) with the other three bronze (nails);
attach the small beam (or under-board) with two bronze (nails).

Then go to the grove for the (remaining) sacrifices.
After arriving at the grove,
call (them) there to the ceremony.

In the grove, place the fire on the altar.

Take the unblemished piglet.
Offer (it) first to Jupiter-Pater at the right side, (away) from the altar,
for the Atiedian Brotherhood,
for the acts performed in the sacred gathering,
for the Iguvine community,
(and) for the Iguvine trinity.
Make the declaration without error.

Then take the unblemished sheep.
Make an offering (of it) to Pomonus Poplicus.
Pronounce the declaration without error.

Use the accustomed formulas next to (or regarding?) the sheep
for the Atiedian Brotherhood,
for the acts performed in the sacred gathering,
for the Iguvine community,
(and) for the Iguvine trinity.

Offer the piglet's ribs on the table.
With it, make grain offerings.

Offer (or sacrifice?) the sheep on the ground (or turf altar?) for burial.

Cut off two pieces from it (and put them?) on one side of the altar (or as burnt offerings?).
Offer this on the ground,
(and) add a strucla cake.

Then cut two (parts) (and put them?) on the other side of the altar.
Then make an offering (or 'present them'?) by the chapel (or statue?) of Pomonus Poplicus,
(and) add a fragment (or 'the phallic portion'?) of the same strucla cake.

Then cut three part (and put them?) on the third side of the altar.
Then, on the upper part of the altar, make an offering by the chapel (or statue?) of Vesona of Pomonus Poplicus,
(and) add a comb-like (or vulva shaped?) portion from the same place (or likewise).

Make an offering with the same vases to Pomonus (and) to Vesona,
by the altar (and) by the chapel,
with un-cut parts (and) with uncuttable (parts)
and (even?) (the parts) without fat(?), (and) with the lower raw (parts),
stretch forth (your hands), pray, approach (or circumambulate) (the altar), (then) stop.

With vases used (and) unused (or wet and dry?), without defect, by the statue (or chapel?),
pray to Pomonus Poplicus (and) to Vesuna of Pomonus Poplicus.

With oil-sticks (or spoons?) (used and unused, without blemish?),
pray to Pomonus Poplicus (and) to Vesuna of Pomonus Poplicus by (their) statues.

Then anoint the statues,
(and distribute) the erus (communal meal?) of each (deity, or portion).

Then present (pur-tivutu) to Pordoviens the libation and the mefa cake from the vessel,
kneeling outside the boundary to the right side of the altar (but facing) toward the altar,
(and) declare (it to be) without blemish.

=== From Tablet VI ===
Here is the fuller text of Tablet VI a 22-34, being the first of three very repetitive and formulaic prayers that the head/officiating priest. (arsfertur = "the one who carries [the sacred fire] to [the altar]) is instructed to say during the libation (line numbers in parentheses) Note that there is no punctuation in the original texts:

teio subocau suboco (23)
dei graboui
ocriper fisiu, totaper iiouina,
erer nomneper erar nomneper.

fos sei, pacer sei,
ocre fisei, (24) tote iiouine,
erer nomne, erar nomne.

arsie tio subocau suboco,
dei grabouie;
arsier frite tio subocau (25) suboco,
dei grabouie.

di grabouie
tio esu bue peracrei pihaclu
ocreper fisiu, totaper iiouina,
irer nomneper, (26) erar nomneper.

dei grabouie,
orer ose, persei ocre fisie pir orto est
toteme iouine arsmor dersecor (27) subator sent,
pusei neip heritu.

dei crabouie
persei tuer perscler uaseto est
pesetomest peretomest (28)
frosetomest daetomest
tuer perscler uirseto auirseto uas est;

di grabouie
persei mersei esu bue (29) peracrei
pihaclu pihafei.

di grabouie
pihatu ocre fisiu pihatu tota iouina.
di grabouie
pihatu ocrer fisier (30) totar iouinar nome:

nerf arsmo
veiro pequo
castruo frif
pihatu.

futu fos pacer pase tua
ocre fisi (31) tote iiouine
erer nomne erar nomne.

di grabouie
saluo seritu ocre fisi
salua seritu tota iiouina.

di (32) grabouie
saluo seritu ocrer fisier
totar iiouinar nome:

nerf arsmo
veiro pequo
castruo fri
salua (33) seritu.

futu fos pacer pase tua
ocre fisi tote iouine
erer nomne erar nomne

di grabouie
tio esu bue (34) peracri pihaclu
ocreper fisiu totaper iouina
erer nomneper erar nomneper
di grabouie
tio subocau

Translation:

Thee I invoke as the one invoked, (23)
Jupiter Grabovius,
for the Fisian Mount, for the state of Iguvium,
for the name of the mount, for the name of the state.

Be thou favourable, be thou propitious
to the Fisian Mount, (24) to the state of Iguvium,
to the name of the mount, to the name of the state.

In the consecration I invoke thee as the one invoked,
Jupiter Grabovius;
in trust of the consecration I invoke thee (25) as the one invoked,
Jupiter Grabovius.

Jupiter Grabovius,
thee I invoke with this perfect ox as a propitiatory offering
for the Fisian Mount, for the state of Iguvium,
for the name of the mount, (26) for the name of the state.

Jupiter Grabovius,
by the effect of this [ox bring it to pass that], if on the Fisian Mount fire hath occurred
or in the state of Iguvium the due rites (27) have been omitted,
that it be as not intended.

Jupiter Grabovius,
if in thy sacrifice there hath been any omission,
any sin, any transgression,
(28) any damage, any delinquency,
if in thy sacrifice there be any seen or unseen fault;

Jupiter Grabovius,
if it be right, with this perfect (29) ox as a propitiatory offering,
may purification be made.

Jupiter Grabovius,
purify the Fisian Mount, purify the state of Iguvium.
Jupiter Grabovius,
purify the name of the Fisian Mount, (30) of the state of Iguvium:

the magistrates, the priesthoods,
the men and the cattle,
the heads [of grain] and the fruits
purify.

Be favourable and propitious with thy peace
to the Fisian Mount, (31) to the state of Iguvium,
to the name of the mount, to the name of the state.

Jupiter Grabovius,
keep safe the Fisian Mount,
keep safe the state of Iguvium.

Jupiter (32) Grabovius,
keep safe the name of the Fisian Mount,
of the state of Iguvium:

the magistrates, the priesthoods,
the men and the cattle,
the heads [of grain] and the fruits
keep safe. (33)

Be favourable and propitious with thy peace
to the Fisian Mount, to the state of Iguvium,
to the name of the mount, to the name of the state.

Jupiter Grabovius,
thee with this perfect (34) ox as a propitiatory offering
for the Fisian Mount, for the state of Iguvium,
for the name of the mount, for the name of the state,
Jupiter Grabovius,
thee I invoke.

The chiastic--AB...BA--envelope construction, beginning with "Thee I invoke ... JG," and ending "JG, Thee I invoke" probably was a stylistic way to clearly mark that this was the end of the complete first prayer, to be followed by the second (below, ll. 35-44) and third (ll. 45-55) essentially identical prayers, both capping with the same phrase, and notably with the verb separated from the phrase at the opening of each of the next two prayers.

Note that veiro pequo...salua seritu "the men and cattle...keep safe" in lines 32-33 matches Latin pastores pecua salua seruassis "the herdsmen and cattle...keep safe" (in Varro, Rerum Rusticarum 2.1.12), and further afield, Avestan θrāθrāi pasuuå: viraiiå: "for the protection of cattle [and] men" (Yasht 13.10), suggesting that some form of the formula goes back to Proto-Indo-European.

== Sources ==
- Bernardino Baldi (1613). In tabulam aeneam eugubinam lingua hetrusca veteri perscriptam, divinatio. Augusta Vindelicorum: ad insigne pinus.
- de Vaan, Michiel (2008). Etymological Dictionary of Latin and the other Italic Languages. Leiden Indo-European Etymological Dictionary Series. Vol. 7. Brill. ISBN 978-90-04-16797-1.
- de Cazanove, Olivier (2007). "Pre-Roman Italy, Before and Under the Romans". A Companion to Roman Religion. John Wiley & Sons, Ltd. pp. 43–57. doi:10.1002/9780470690970.ch4?msockid=077e5e67cd7361c6226d4804ccb160e0. ISBN 978-0-470-69097-0.
- Dumézil, Georges (1970) [1966]. La Religion romaine archaique suivi d'un appendice sur la religion des Etrusques [Archaic Roman religion, with an appendix on the religion of the Etruscans]. Translated by Krapp, Phillip. The University of Chicago Press. ISBN 0-226-16968-5. LCCN 76-116981.
- Simon Theodor Aufrecht and Adolf Kirchhof, Die umbrische Sprachdenkmäler: ein Versuch zur Deutung derselben, Berlin, 1849 and 1851 (2 vol.)
- Friedrich Panzerbieter, Questiones Umbricae, Meiningen, 1851
- Eduard Huschke, Die iguvischen Tafeln nebst den kleineren umbrischen Inschriften: mit Hinzufügung einer Grammatik und eines Glossars der umbrischen Sprache, Leipzig, 1859
- Francis William Newman, The Iguvine Tablets, London, 1863.
- Michel Bréal, Les Tables eugubines: texte, traduction et commentaire, avec une grammaire et une introduction historique, Paris, 1875 (2 vol.)
- Kent, Roland Grubb (1926). "Word Contamination in the Italic Dialects". Transactions and Proceedings of the American Philological Association. 57: 51–59. doi:10.2307/282764. ISSN 0065-9711.
- Hermann Osthoff, "Umbrica" in Studien zur Griechische und Lateinische Grammatik, 9, 1876, pp. 273–284
- Franz Bücheler, Umbrica, Bonn, 1883.
- Luigi Ceci, Tabulae Iguvinae in usum academicum, Turin, 1892
- Robert von Planta, Grammatik der oskisch-umbrischen Dialekte, Strassburg, 1892-1897 (2 vol.)
- Robert S. Conway, The Italic dialects, Cambridge, 1897
- Roland G. Kent, "Studies in the Iguvine Tables" in Classical Philology, 15, 1920, p. 353-369
- Rigobianco, Luca (2024). "Vowel reduction and deletion in Archaic Latin: contact-induced phenomena?". In Viti, Carlotta (ed.). Ancient Greek and Latin in the linguistic context of the ancient Mediterranean. Sprachvergleich. Narr Francke Attempto. doi:10.24053/9783823395850. ISBN 978-3-8233-9585-0. ISSN 2569-2275.
- Carl Darling Buck, A grammar of Oscan and Umbrian, Boston, 1928 (2nd ed.)
- Albrecht von Blumenthal, Die iguvinische Tafeln: Text, Übersetzung, Untersuchungen, Stuttgart, 1931
- Irene Rosenzweig, Ritual and cults in pre-Roman Iguvium: with an appendix giving the text of the Iguvine Tablets, London, 1937
- Fisher, Jay (2014-01-01), "Spoken Prayers and Written Instructions in the Central Italian Cultural Koinê and Beyond", in Scodel, Ruth (ed.), Between Orality and Literacy: Communication and Adaptation in Antiquity, BRILL, pp. 197–217, doi:10.1163/9789004270978_012, ISBN 978-90-04-27097-8
- Giacomo Devoto, Tabulae Iguvinae, Rome, 1940 (2nd ed.; reprinted in 1954)
- Giacomo Devoto, Le Tavole di Gubbio, Florence, 1948
- Giovanni Battista Pighi, Umbrica. 1, La composizione del libro rituale di Gubbio; 2, L'auspicio, Bologna, 1953
- Gino Bottiglioni, Manuale dei dialetti italici, Bologna, 1954
- Poultney, James W. "The Two Boar-Sacrifices in the Iguvine Tables." The American Journal of Philology 77, no. 2 (1956): 177-80. Accessed May 5, 2020. doi:10.2307/292478.
- Ugo Coli, Il diritto pubblico degli Umbri e le Tavole eugubine, Milan, 1958
- Poultney JW (1959). The Bronze Tables of Iguvium. American Philological Association, Number XVIII.
- Alfred Ernout, Le dialecte ombrien: lexique du vocabulaire des "Tables eugubines" et des inscriptions, Paris, 1961
- Giacomo Devoto, Tabulae Iguvinae. Pars quinta: appendix, Rome, 1962
- Ambros J. Pfiffig, Religio Iguvina: philologische und religionsgeschichtliche Studien zu den Tabulae Iguvinae: mit Text und Übersetzung, Vienna, 1964
- Pio Paolucci (1966). Scheggia - Note Critico-Storiche (PDF) (in Italian). La Toscografica.
- Aldo Luigi Prosdocimi, Studi iguvini, Florence, 1969
- Willy Alfred Borgeaud, Fasti Umbrici: études sur le vocabulaire et le rituel des Tables eugubines, Ottawa, 1982
- Aldo Luigi Prosdocimi, Le Tavole iguvine. 1, Florence, 1984 (2 vol.)
- Gerhard Meiser, Lautgeschichte der umbrischen Sprache, Innsbruck, 1986
- Williamson, Callie. "Monuments of Bronze: Roman Legal Documents on Bronze Tablets." Classical Antiquity 6, no. 1 (1987): 160-83. Accessed May 5, 2020. doi:10.2307/25010862.
- Augusto Ancillotti and Romolo Cerri, Le Tavole di Gubbio e la civiltà degli Umbri, Perugia, 1996
- J. B. Wilkins, "The Iguvine Tables: problems in the interpretation of ritual text," in Malone/Stoddart (eds) 1994, 152-177.
- Franco Benucci, Studi di sintassi umbra: il verbo nelle Tavole iguvine e nelle iscrizioni minori, Padua, 1996
- Augusto Ancillotti and Romolo Cerri, Le Tavole iguvine: fotografie a colori, facsimili, testo traslitterato, traduzione e commento, Perugia, 1997
- Brigitte Schirmer, Studien zum Wortschatz der Iguvinischen Tafeln: die Verben des Betens und Sprechens, Frankfurt, 1998
- Jürgen Untermann, Wörterbuch des Oskisch-Umbrischen. Indogermanische Bibliothek. Erste Reihe, Lehr- und Handbücher. Heidelberg: C. Winter, 2000.
- Simone Sisani, Tuta Ikuvina: sviluppo e ideologia della forma urbana a Gubbio, Rome, 2001
- Helmut Rix, Sabellische Texte: die Texte des Oskischen, Umbrischen und Südpikenischen, Heidelberg 2002.
- Carlo D'Adamo, Il dio Grabo, il divino Augusto, e le Tavole iguvine riprodotte, traslitterate, tradotte e commentate, San Giovanni in Persiceto, 2004
- Maria Luisa Porzio Gernia, Offerta rituale e mondo divino: contributo all'interpretazione delle Tavole di Gubbio, Alessandria, 2005
- Maria Luisa Porzio Gernia, La pax divina: tra storia e preistoria linguistica: la testimonianza delle Tavole di Gubbio, Alessandria, 2007
- Rex Wallace, The Sabellic Languages of Ancient Italy, Lincom, 2007
- Michael L. Weiss, Language and ritual in Sabellic Italy: the ritual complex of the third and the fourth Tabulae Iguvinae, Leiden, 2010
- Weiss, Michael (2017). "An Italo-Celtic Divinity and a Common Sabellic Sound Change". Classical Antiquity. 36 (2): 370–389. ISSN 0278-6656.
- Patrizia Castelli and Salvatore Geruzzi (edd.), Prima e dopo le Tavole eugubine: falsi e copie fra tradizione antiquaria e rivisitazioni dell’antico, Pisa, 2010
- Lacam, J.-C. (2010). Vestiça and vestikatu: New comments on two related terms in the Iguvine Tablets. Revue de philologie, de littérature et d'histoire anciennes. 84. 251-263.
- Nagy, Gregory, (2020) "The fire ritual of the Iguvine Tables: Facing a central problem in the study of ritual language" Classical World 100:151–157 https://chs.harvard.edu/curated-article/gregory-nagy-the-fire-ritual-of-the-iguvine-tables-facing-a-central-problem-in-the-study-of-ritual-language/
- Turcan, Robert (2000). The Gods of ancient Rome: Religion in Everyday Life from Archaic to Imperial Times. Routledge. ISBN 978-0-415-92973-8.
- Vine, Brent (1986). "An Umbrian-Latin Correspondence". Harvard Studies in Classical Philology. 90: 111–127. doi:10.2307/311464. ISSN 0073-0688.
- Zair, Nicholas (2016-11-01). "Vowel weakening in the Sabellic languages as language contact". Indogermanische Forschungen (in German). 121 (1): 295–316. doi:10.1515/if-2016-0016. ISSN 1613-0405.
