= Sentino =

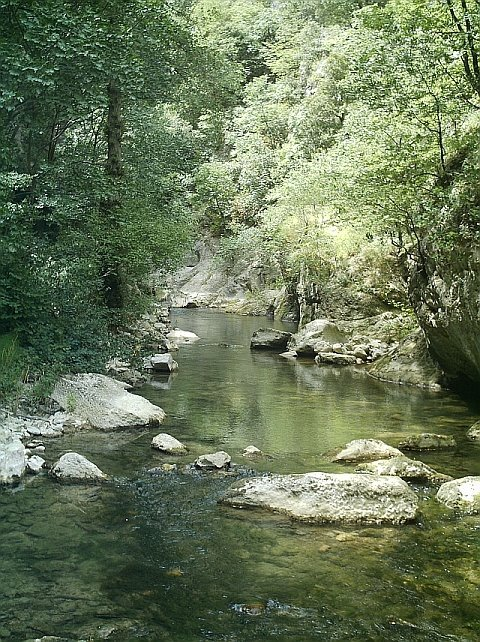
- The river at the Corno di Catria gorge

Location
- Country: Italy
- Regions: Umbria; Marche

Physical characteristics
- Source
  - elevation: 750 m (2,460 ft)
- Mouth: Esino
  - location: Genga, Marche
  - coordinates: 43°23′50″N 12°58′33″E
- Length: 42 km (26 mi)
- Basin size: 388 km^{2} (150 sq mi)
- Discharge
  - average: 3.44 m^{3}/s (121 cu ft/s)

The Sentino is a tributary of the Esino River, which springs at 750 m above sea level above the mountains of Gubbio, in Umbria. The Sentino flows from the north-eastern slope of Madonna della Cima.

The source gushes from the north-eastern slope of Madonna della Cima and initially flows through the hills of the pre-Apennines of Gubbio, collecting the influx of many small streams.

When it reaches the village of Scheggia, it cuts through the chain of Apennines, creating the Gola del Corno del Catria, located in the northern sector of the Monte Cucco Park.

Having crossed the Apennines, the Sentino enters the Marche region through a valley dotted with hermitages and monasteries, including Sant'Emiliano in Congiuntoli, until it reaches the town of Sassoferrato: the ancient Roman city of Sentinum, from which it takes its name.

Continuing its course, the river meets the Fabriano pre-Apennines generating the imposing Frasassi Gorge, famous for the homonymous cave, which the Sentino in the past has contributed to its genesis.

Once past the Frasassi Gorge, near San Vittore Terme, the Sentino concludes its 42 km journey by meeting the Esino River, of which it becomes its main tributary.

The average flow rate of the Sentino is about 3 m³/s.
