= Sant'Emiliano in Congiuntoli =

Abbey in Scheggia e Pascelupo, Italy

Coordinates: 43°24′54.86″N 12°46′54.34″E

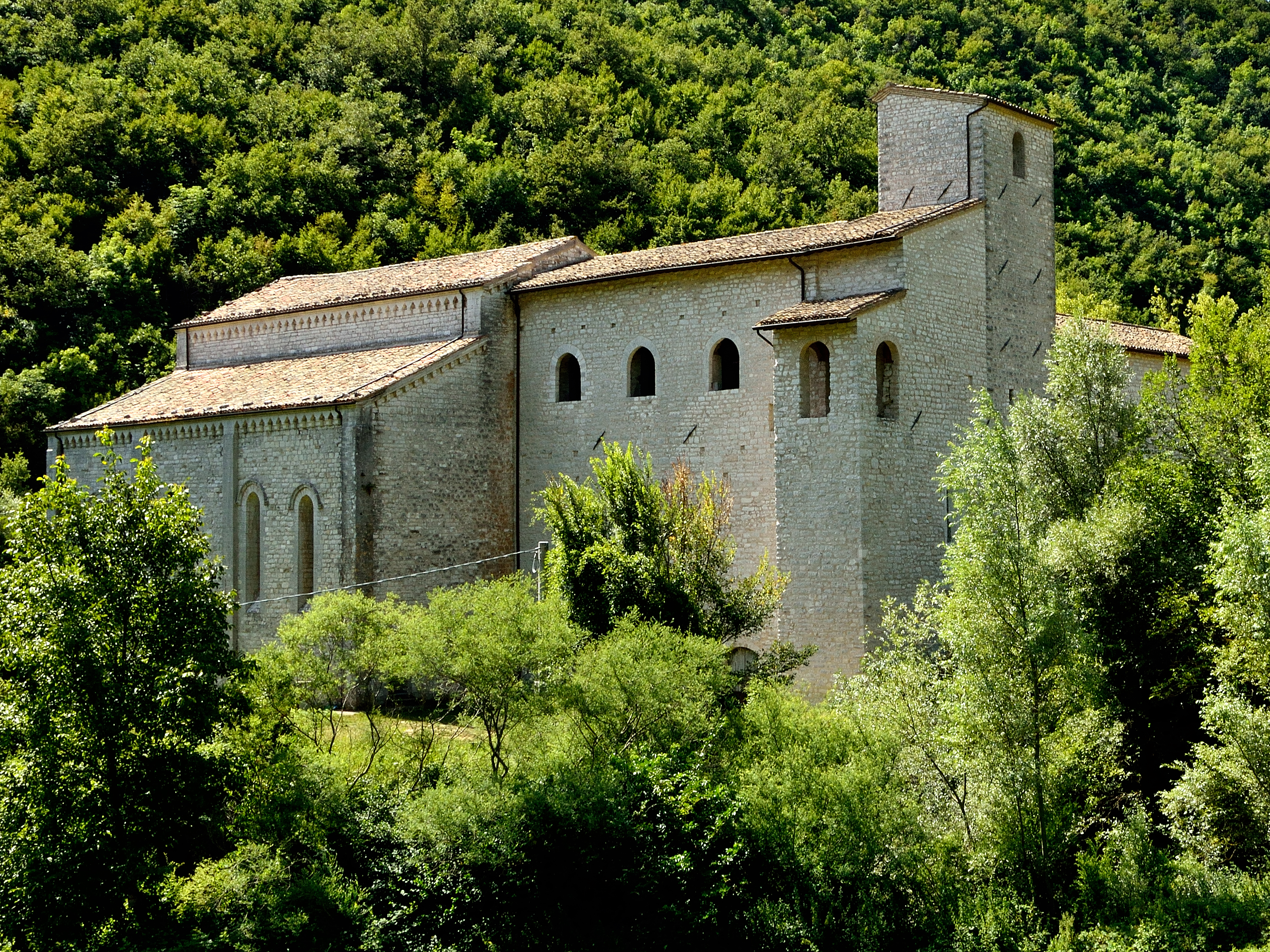
Sant'Emiliano in Congiuntoli Abbey

Sant' Emiliano in Congiuntoli is a medieval abbey, now disused and private property, serving as a farmhouse in the comune (township) of Scheggia e Pascelupo in Umbria, central Italy. The large and almost windowless church is a powerfully austere example of Romanesque architecture.

== See also ==
- Medieval commune
