= Fonte Avellana =

Roman Catholic hermitage in Italy

Coordinates: 43°28′22″N 12°43′40″E

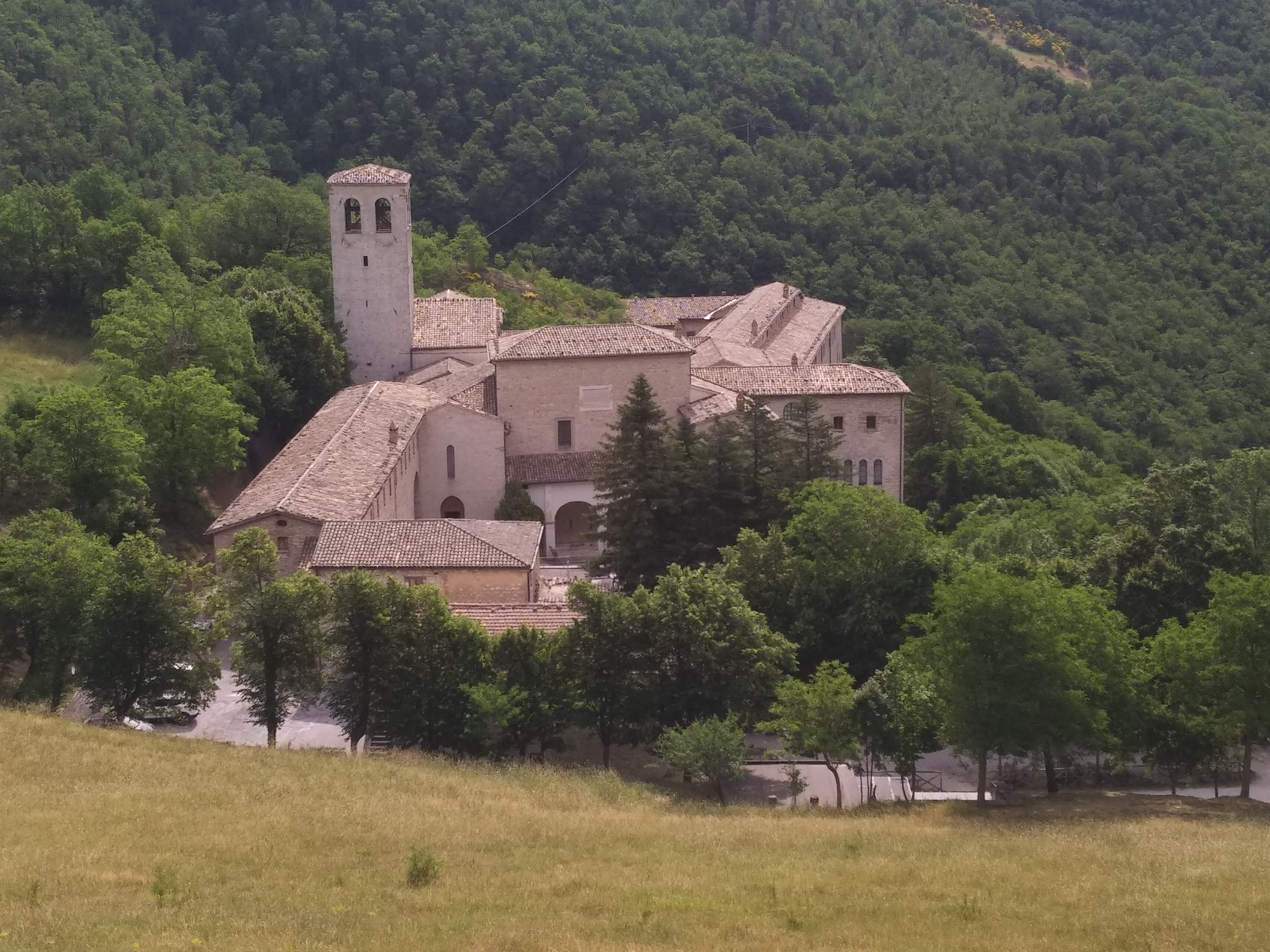
Fonte Avellana Monastery

Fonte Avellana or the Venerable Hermitage of the Holy Cross, is a Roman Catholic hermitage in Serra Sant'Abbondio in the Marche region of Italy. It was once also the name of an order of hermits based at this hermitage.

== History ==
Fonte Avellana was established by a group of hermits living at that site around 980. The tradition of the monastery holds that it was founded by Ludolfi Pamfili, a former soldier, later hermit. It was closely connected to the reforms of St. Romuald, and its early customs and documents share much in common with the nearby hermitage of Camaldoli established by Romuald. In 1035 Peter Damian entered the community, where he became a Benedictine monk and then prior of the hermitage in 1043. He enlarged the library, constructed a nearby cloister, and established a monastic house near San Severino. Albertino of Montone later also became prior there.

It was raised to the status of an abbey in 1325, and remains the only Camaldolese house to have such a designation (all other such houses being designated simply as hermitages or monasteries). It soon came under lay control, however, and the fortunes of the community quickly deteriorated. The community, in fact, eventually became part of the Camaldolese congregation. Nevertheless, it continued in existence, until it was scattered by Napoleonic forces. In the second half of the 19th century, its ancient book collection was sold, following the requisition of all ecclesiastical properties by the Italian Government due to friction with the Church. Yet after the upheavals of that period, the monastic community was again established and continues today as a major house of the congregation.

One notable feature of its architecture is that the cells of the hermits were built as suites. This way a hermit and his disciple could share the cell, yet each had their own sleeping space within it. This reflects the ancient custom of a hermit taking a young monk as a disciple, whom he would train in the ascetic life and often who would care for the older hermit as he aged.

Dante visited Fonte Avellana and described it in the Divine Comedy. Pope John Paul II celebrated a 1000-year anniversary mass at Fonte Avellana in 1985.
