= Temple of Jupiter Apenninus =

- Templum Jovis Apennini
- Temple of Jupiter Poeninus
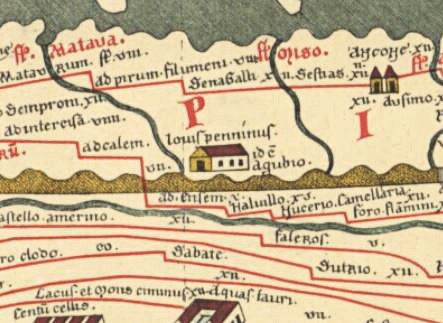
- The Temple (building in the center) and the Statio ad Ensem on the Tabula Peutingeriana

- Location within Italy
- 43°25′02″N 12°39′22″E
- Type: Temple
- Cultures: Umbrian, Roman
- Location: Piaggia dei Bagni, Scheggia e Pascelupo, Umbria, Italy
- Region: Regio VI Umbria

History
- Built: Before 1st century AD
- Abandoned: After 5th century AD

Site notes
- Condition: Disappeared

The Temple of Jupiter Apenninus or Temple of Jupiter Poeninus was an Umbrian-Roman temple that lay at the foot of Monte Catria, near the modern village of Scheggia, between today's Umbria and Marche regions, in Italy. The temple stood near the ancient Via Flaminia, 200 km (135 Roman miles) from Rome, where the road crossed the Apennines. The structure, once one of the most important Umbrian shrines, has now completely disappeared.

== Dedication ==
The temple was dedicated to Jupiter Poeninus or Apenninus, resulting from the syncretization of the Celtic deity Poenina/Poeninus with Jupiter. The deity was linked to the Ligurian god Poeninus mentioned by Livy in relation to a cult on the mountain, in turn linked to the Celtic term pen, meaning "mountain, hill", or more generally "height". The cult of Jupiter Poeninus originated before the Roman conquest, and was imported into Umbria by the Celts. In this region it is attested not only in Scheggia, but also in neighbouring territories, such as that of Nuceria Camellana, where the highest peak in the area, Monte Pennino, was named after the god.

A dedicatory inscription described below attributes to this divinity the appellation "Optimus Maximus", proper to Jupiter. The deity should be identified with Jupiter Grabovius, a god mentioned many times in the Iguvine Tablets. Together with Mars Grabovius and Vofionus Grabovius he was part of the Archaic Triad of Ikuvium/Iguvium (today's Gubbio).

== Location ==
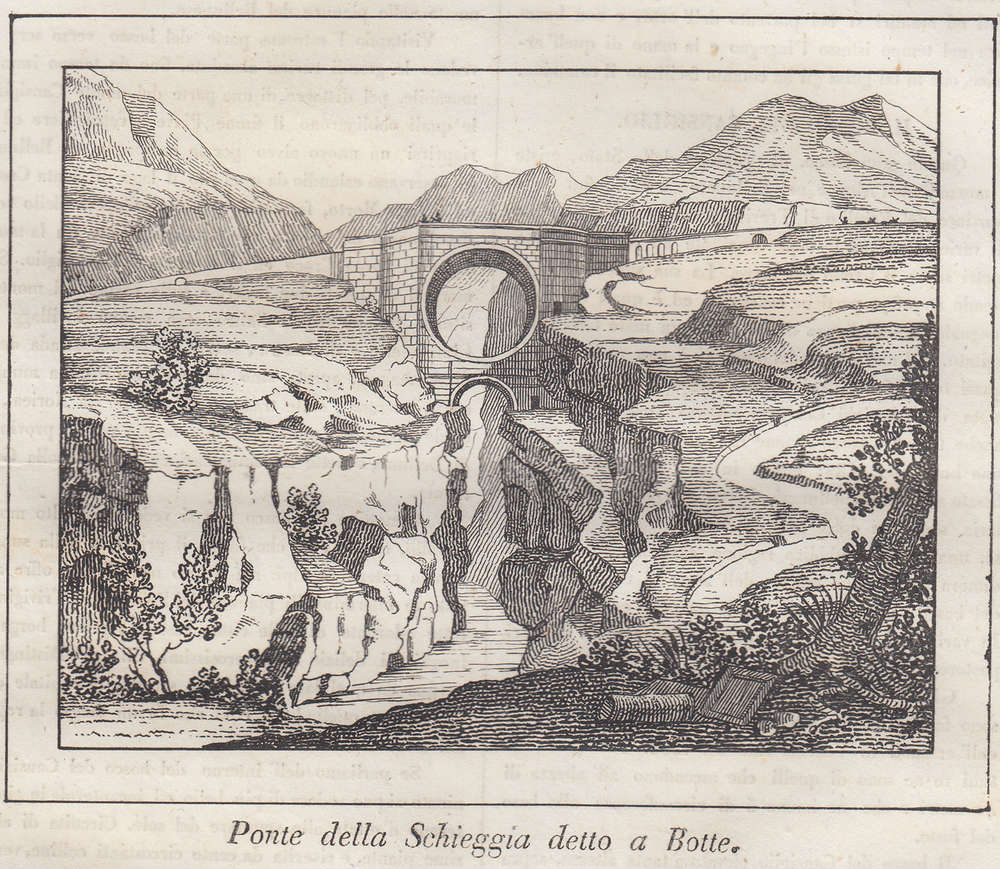
The Ponte a botte ("Barrel bridge") along the Via Flaminia near Scheggia in a 1837 woodcut. It is presumed that the temple was located on the mountain above the southern (right) part of the bridge

The Tabula Peutingeriana, dating back to the second half of the 4th century AD, shows, at the point where the Via Flaminia crosses the Apennines, the inscription ad Ensem, referring to a post station (mansio). Close to it, there is the drawing of a temple, with the inscription "Iovis Penninus id e(st) Agubio", referring to the nearby city of Gubbio (Iguvium). The Statio ad Hensem, mentioned by all the ancient Itineraria (Antonini, Gaditanum, Burdigalense), lay 133 miles from Rome along the Via Flaminia, and has been identified with the modern village of Scheggia. Iguvium is not cited in the Itineraria, as it was not situated along the Roman road, and is only mentioned on the Tabula, since it was the nearest city to the Temple of Jupiter. It is possible that Ad Hensem belonged to the city's territory, a fact confirmed by Pliny the Younger, who writes in his Naturalis historia that the inhabitants of Iguvium used to sell along the Via Flaminia a certain medicinal herb.

In a nineteenth-century work the ruins then visible near il castello della Scheggia were attributed to the sanctuary mentioned in the ancient sources. According to Gaetano Moroni, the Temple of Jupiter Apenninus would have been located at La Piaggia dei Bagni di Scheggia, at about 2.5 km from the village of Scheggia. This place is close to the modern Ponte a Botte ("Barrel Bridge"), erected in 1802-5 along the Via Flaminia, in the site called Campo delle Grigne, i.e. 'the field of conglomerate rocks', on the north-western slopes of Monte Sènnico (also known as delle Pianelle or Petrara). This area belonged to the territory of the ancient cities of Iguvium and Luceoli, and now lies at the border between the municipalities of Scheggia e Pascelupo, in the province of Perugia, and Cantiano in the province of Pesaro and Urbino. The temple stood where the ancient Via Flaminia crossed the Apennines, at 135 Roman miles from Rome. Before the construction of the barrel bridge, the road went downhill crossing a stream and wound its way up the mountain in a tortuous route of nine bends (known as the Lumaca di Scheggia, "Scheggia's Snail"). From a passage by Claudian mentioned below, it is probable that the temple lay at the top of the slope, in correspondence with the modern ANAS' Casa Cantoniera (the service house of the road workers).

== History ==
For those who accept the version of the discovery of the Iguvine Tablets near Scheggia in 1444, these were housed in the temple. In that case, the shrine–similarly to the Fanum Voltumnae of the Etruscans–can be identified as the federal sanctuary of the Umbrians. As such it must have been of considerable age, and would have been romanised at a later date. The ante quem period for its construction is the first century AD, the age of the cippus cited in the next section. At that time, the temple was located in the heart of the Regio VI Umbria.

From ancient sources it is known that in the 3rd century AD the shrine was famous as an oracular sanctuary: in the Historia Augusta Flavius Vopiscus reports how emperor Aurelian (r. 270–275) wanted to display in his temple of the Sun in Rome a golden statue of Jupiter and how, "Appenninis sortibus additis" ("according to the response of the oracle of the Apennines"), he wanted to call it with the name of Jupiter "Consul" or "Consultant". Another author of the Historia Augusta, Trebellius Pollio, tells how emperor Claudius Gothicus (r. 268–270) had consulted the oracle "in the Apennines" three times, for himself, for his descendants and for his brother Quintillus.

The temple's importance can be inferred also from the fact that in the Tabula Peutingeriana it is one of three temples depicted along the whole Via Flaminia.

The shrine was still standing at the beginning of the 5th century: the poet Claudian, describing Honorius' (r. 393–423) journey from Ravenna to Rome in 404, reports how after the Furlo gorge the emperor

...exuperans delubra Iovis saxoque minantes / Appenninigenis cultas pastoribus aras

...overcomes the sanctuary of Jupiter and the altars overhung by the rock, venerated by the shepherds of the Apennines

== Findings ==
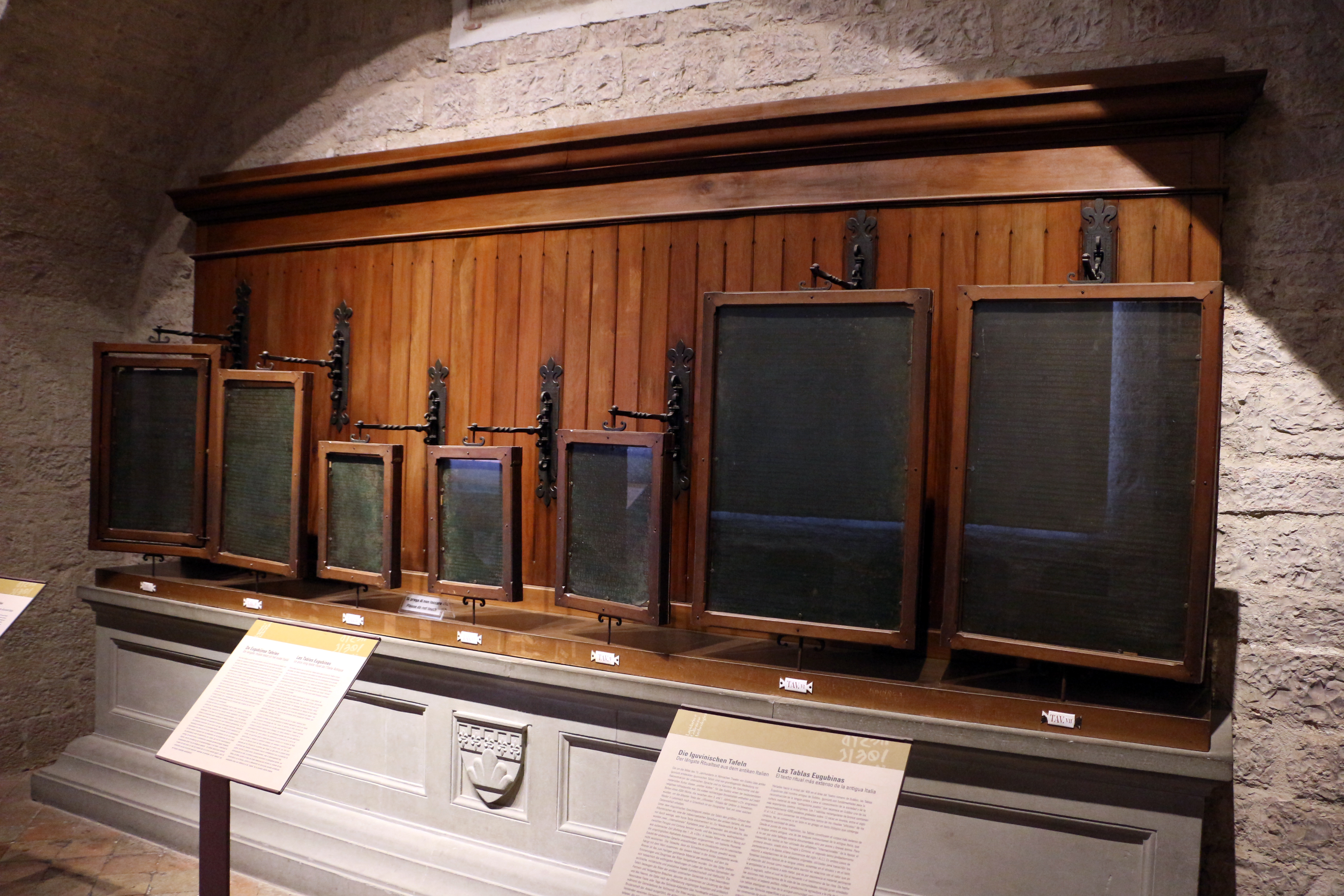
The Iguvine Tablets were probably on display in the temple of Iupiter

At the beginning of the eighteenth century, during works to improve the via Flaminia ordered by Pope Clement XI (r. 1700–1721), ruins of ancient buildings and an inscription on a memorial cippus were found in the locality of Piaggia dei Bagni, between what is now Scheggia and Pontericciòli di Cantiano. The cippus, dating back to the first century AD and now kept in the Museo lapidario maffeiano in Verona, bears the following dedication by a couple of liberti ("freedmen") of Greek origin to Jupiter Apenninus.

IOVI APENINO - T. VIVIVS CARMOGENES (ET) SVLPICIA EV(PHRO)SINE CONIVX - V.S.D.D.

Titus Vivius Carmogenes and his spouse Sulpicia Euphrosine, having fulfilled their vow, dedicated to Jupiter Apenninus

Another cippus, found at the beginning of the 18th century in the same place where the previous epigraph was found and now in the Museo di antichità in Turin, was dedicated to Jupiter Optimus Maximus by a Roman woman:

I.O.M.S. - PRO SALVTE CN ACONI CRESCENT(II) ARA POSVIT BAEBIDIA POTESTAS

Sacred to Jupiter Optimus Maximus. Bebidia Potestas erected the altar for the health of Gnaeus Acon Crescentius

A thunderbolt is carved on the left side and an eagle on the right side of the cippus, both being symbols of the god. The discovery in the Piaggia dei Bagni of two epigraphs both related to Jupiter shores up the hypothesis about the location of the Temple of Jupiter Apennine in this place.

More recent excavations in the Piaggia dei Bagni have brought to light tanks from the Roman era, which collected water from the local springs, hypothetically connected to the sanctuary. They are similar to the pools built next to the Temple of Fortuna Primigenia in Praeneste. These pools, that shed light on the origin of the place name ("Baths' clearing"), allowed the faithful to wash themselves and perform ablutions before praying in the temple.

The temple structure, however, has completely disappeared.

== Sources ==
- Pio Paolucci (1966). Scheggia - Note Critico-Storiche (PDF) (in Italian). Empoli: La Toscografica.
- Sigismondi, Gino (1979). Nuceria in Umbria (in Italian). Foligno: Ediclio.
- AA.VV. (2004). Umbria. Guida d'Italia (in Italian). Milano: Touring Club Italiano.
