= Serra Sant'Abbondio =

- Comune
- Comune di Serra Sant'Abbondio
- Coat of arms

- Location within Italy Location within Marche
- Coordinates: 43°29′N 12°46′E
- Country: Italy
- Region: Marche
- Province: Pesaro e Urbino (PU)

Government
  - Mayor: Nadia Mollaroli

Area
  - Total: 32.8 km^{2} (12.7 sq mi)

Population (28 February 2009)
  - Total: 1,114
  - Density: 34.0/km^{2} (88.0/sq mi)
- Time zone: UTC+1 (CET)
  - Summer (DST): UTC+2 (CEST)
- Postal code: 61040
- Dialing code: 0721

Serra Sant'Abbondio is a comune (municipality) in the Province of Pesaro e Urbino in the Italian region Marche, located about 60 kilometres (37 mi) west of Ancona and about 50 kilometres (31 mi) south of Pesaro.

It is the home of the historic hermitage of Fonte Avellana.
