= Palazzo del Bargello, Gubbio =

14th century civic palace in Italy

Coordinates: 43.354432°N 12.576726°E

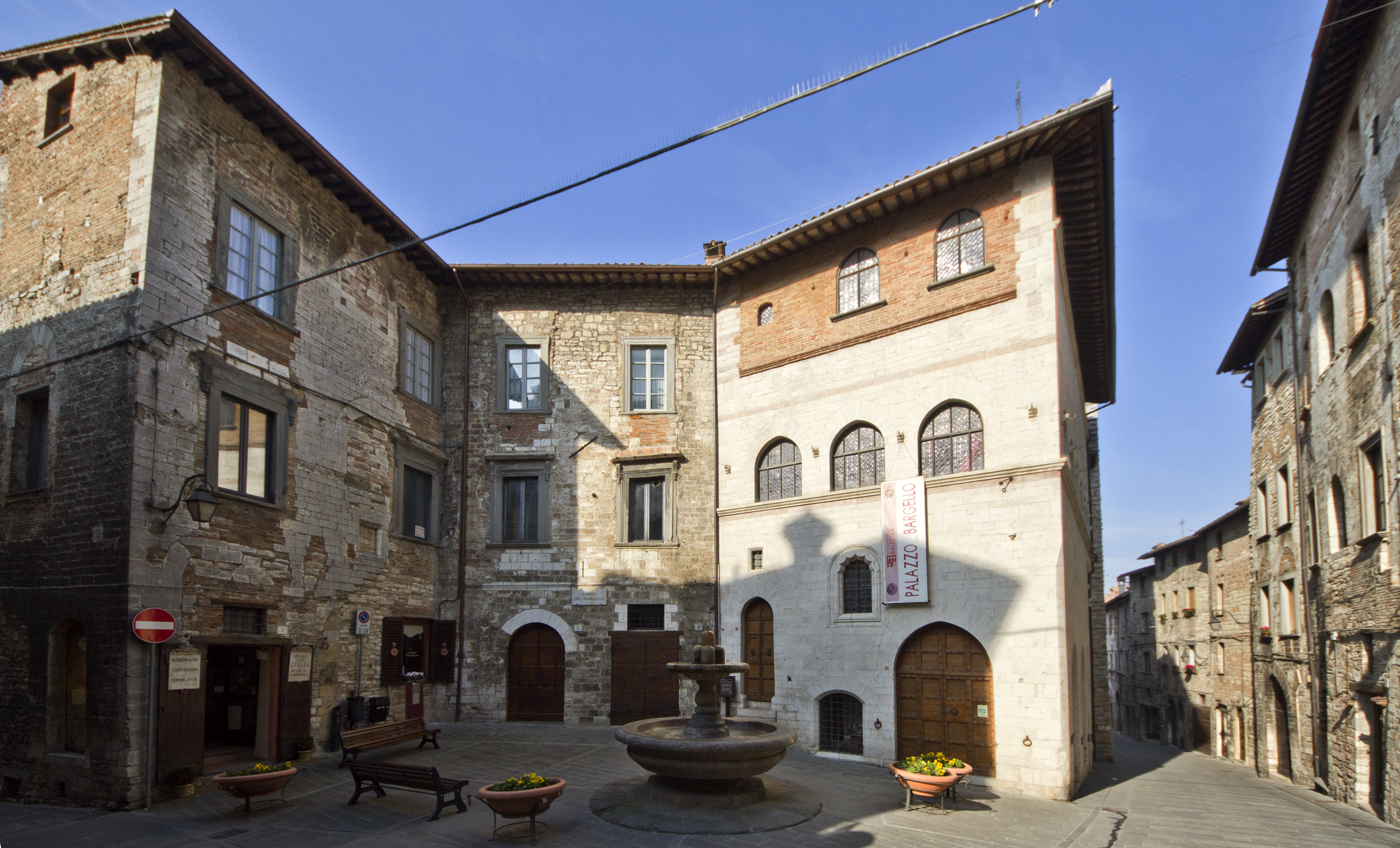

The Palazzo del Bargello is a 14th-century Gothic architecture, civic palace located on Via del Consoli #35 in the historic center of Gubbio, region of Umbria, Italy. It now houses an exhibition or Museo della Balestra (crossbowmen), celebrated with a yearly festival. In front of the palace is the Fontana di Matto, now whimsically used to award a "license to be crazy" (Patente di Matto). Across the street is the small 13th-century church of San Giuliano that gave name to a gate nearby and this quarter of the city.

== History ==
The church of San Giuliano was adjacent to one of the early medieval walls of the city, hence this palace is situated in an area outside those walls. The palace was constructed in the circa 1302 to house the city police captain and offices.

The small piazza in front has an undistinguished fountain topped with the five mountains and a lily, a heraldic symbol of Gubbio. It has been a local tradition, mostly for visitors that a person who orbits the fountain three times, then douses or washes himself with its water, can be awarded, at a cost, the Patente di Matto.
