= List of municipalities of the Province of Ancona =

The following is a list of the 47 municipalities (comuni) of the Province of Ancona in the region of Marche in Italy.

== List ==
Municipality	Population (2026)	Area (km²)	Density
Agugliano	4,632	21.89	211.6
Ancona	100,151	124.84	802.2
Arcevia	4,245	128.33	33.1
Barbara	1,267	11.04	114.8
Belvedere Ostrense	2,070	29.45	70.3
Camerano	6,997	20.00	349.9
Camerata Picena	2,481	11.89	208.7
Castelbellino	4,905	6.05	810.7
Castelfidardo	18,333	33.39	549.1
Castelleone di Suasa	1,542	15.92	96.9
Castelplanio	3,612	15.32	235.8
Cerreto d'Esi	3,333	16.91	197.1
Chiaravalle	14,179	17.60	805.6
Corinaldo	4,729	49.28	96.0
Cupramontana	4,321	27.40	157.7
Fabriano	28,469	272.08	104.6
Falconara Marittima	26,022	25.82	1,007.8
Filottrano	8,849	71.20	124.3
Genga	1,612	73.16	22.0
Jesi	39,430	108.90	362.1
Loreto	13,083	17.90	730.9
Maiolati Spontini	5,927	21.49	275.8
Mergo	970	7.28	133.2
Monsano	3,184	14.66	217.2
Monte Roberto	2,992	13.57	220.5
Monte San Vito	6,680	21.81	306.3
Montecarotto	1,849	24.39	75.8
Montemarciano	9,827	22.31	440.5
Morro d'Alba	1,800	19.46	92.5
Numana	3,737	10.94	341.6
Offagna	2,117	10.63	199.2
Osimo	34,780	106.74	325.8
Ostra	6,216	47.25	131.6
Ostra Vetere	3,042	30.02	101.3
Poggio San Marcello	683	13.36	51.1
Polverigi	4,539	24.98	181.7
Rosora	1,788	9.41	190.0
San Marcello	2,006	25.78	77.8
San Paolo di Jesi	909	10.11	89.9
Santa Maria Nuova	3,880	18.29	212.1
Sassoferrato	6,797	137.23	49.5
Senigallia	43,808	117.77	372.0
Serra de' Conti	3,515	24.54	143.2
Serra San Quirico	2,469	49.33	50.1
Sirolo	4,090	16.68	245.2
Staffolo	2,149	27.50	78.1
Trecastelli	7,597	39.30	193.3

== See also ==
- List of municipalities of Marche
- List of municipalities of Italy
