= Esino =

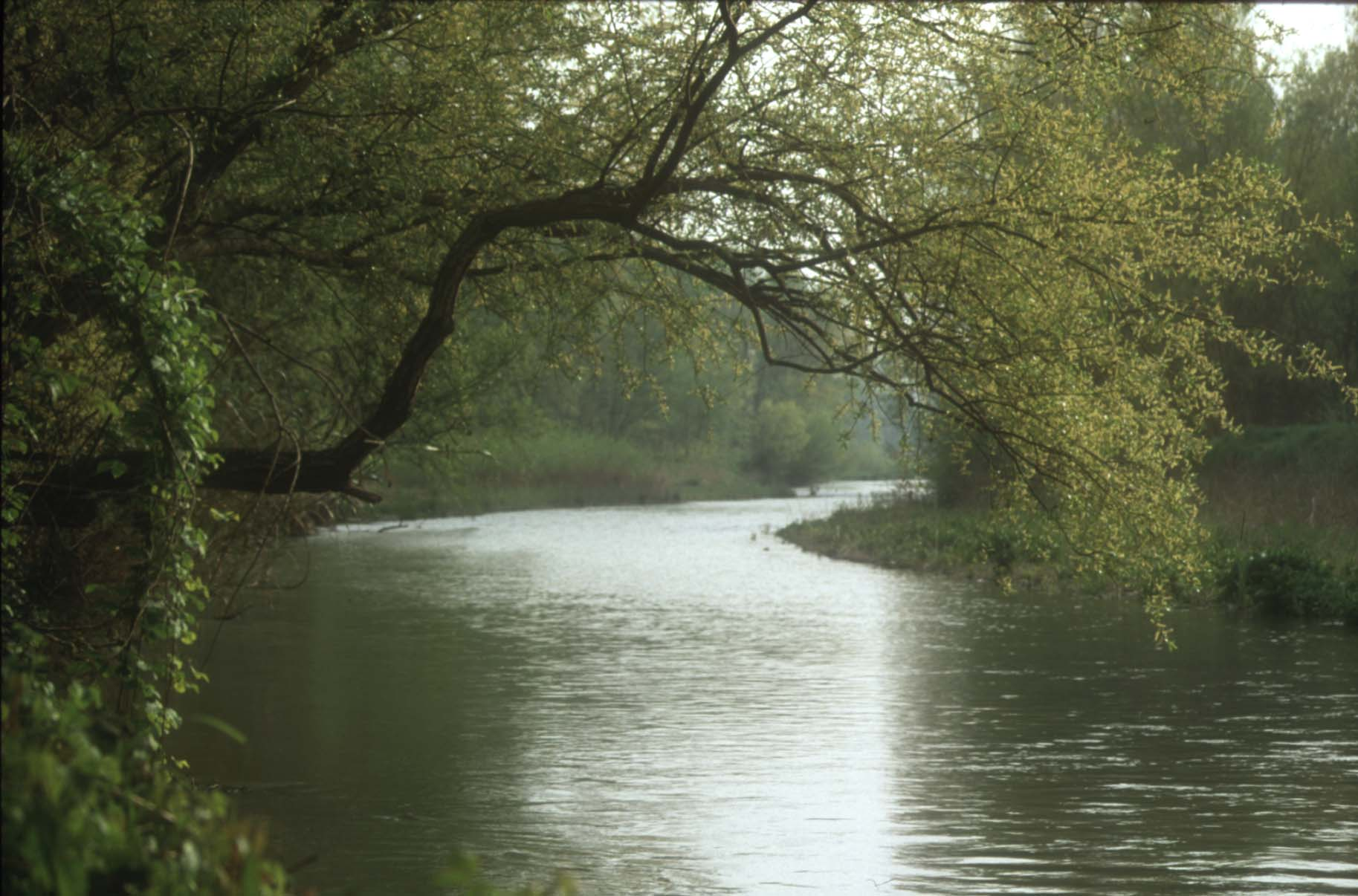

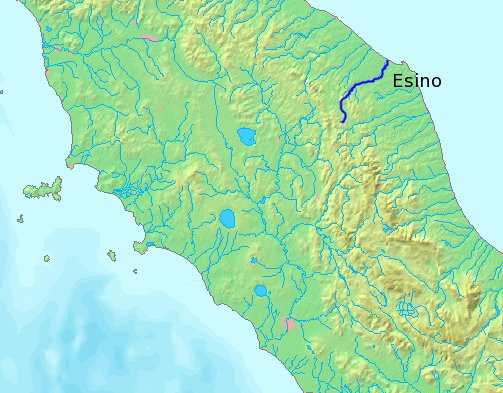

Location
- Country: Italy

Physical characteristics
- Source
  - location: Province of Macerata, near Esanatoglia
  - elevation: 1,116 m (3,661 ft)
- Mouth: Adriatic Sea
  - location: Falconara Marittima
  - coordinates: 43.6428°N 13.3730°E
- Length: 85 km (53 mi)
- Basin size: 1,203 km^{2} (464 sq mi)
- Discharge
  - average: 18 m^{3}/s (640 cu ft/s)

The Esino (Italian: [eˈziːno]; Latin: Aesis) is a river in the Marche region of central Italy.

== Geography ==
The source of the river is east of Monte Penna, in the province of Macerata, near the border with the province of Ancona. The river flows east past Esanatoglia and curves north by Matelica before crossing the border into the province of Ancona near Cerreto d'Esi. The river continues flowing north before curving northeast near Genga. It then flows northeast near Serra San Quirico, Maiolati Spontini, Castelplanio, Castelbellino, Jesi, Chiaravalle and Montemarciano before flowing into the Adriatic Sea near Falconara Marittima.

== Esino DOC ==
Since 1995, the area around the Esino has been permitted to produce red and white Italian DOC wines. Grapes are limited to a harvest yield of 12 tonnes/ha with the finished wines requiring a minimum alcohol level of 10.5%. Reds are a minimum 60% of Montepulciano and/or Sangiovese, with other local grape varieties permitted to fill out the rest. Whites are predominantly composed of Verdicchio (50–100%), with other local varieties permitted to fill out the rest.

== See also ==
- List of Italian DOC wines
