= Andrea Vici =

Italian architect and engineer

Andrea Vici (1743–1817) was an Italian architect and engineer, active in a Neoclassical style. He was a pupil of Luigi Vanvitelli, and active in the Papal States comprising parts of Lazio, Umbria, and Marche.

== Biography ==
Andrea was born in Arcevia in the Marche, the brother of Arcangelo, who was also an architect of note, leaving behind works at Jesi, Arcevia, Fano, Corinaldo, and Cupramontana. At the age of 14, Andrea was given a classical education in mathematics, letters and design by Francesco Appiani at Perugia. At the age of 17 he joined the studio of the painter Cesare Pozzi in Rome, then studied architecture under Carlo Murena. At the age of 26 years, he was recruited by the eminent architect Luigi Vanvitelli to work at the Reggia di Caserta and in the church of the Santissima Annunziata in Naples.

Moving to the Papal states, he became an important architect and engineer. He was named Count and later palatine prince, president of the Pontifical Academy of St Luke in Rome in 1802. In 1804, he was named a member of the Academy of the Arcadia, along with the architect Metastasio of the Sacra Congregazione Lauretana nel 1783. In Rome, he befriended Antonio Canova and was ultimately buried in Santa Maria in Vallicella, Rome.

Among his many designs and contributions include works for:

- Chiesa del Sacramento, Offagna
- Treia Cathedral
- Villa Votalarca, Treia
- Collegio Campana, Osimo
- Villa Bonaccorsi, Osimo
- Chapel of the Basilica of Loreto
- Monastery of Santa Caterina, Cingoli
- Portal and Chapel of the Castle of Rocca Priora, Falconara Marittima
- Grand staircase (Scalone) of Palazzo Lolli-Benigni, Fabriano
- Fossombrone Cathedral
- Camerino Cathedral
- Hospital of Pergola
- City Hall of Poggio San Marcello
- City Hall of Bevagna
- Palazzo Porta, Gubbio
- San Francesco, Foligno
- Palazzo Connestabile della Staffa, Perugia
- Palazzo e la Cappella Gozzoli, Terni
- Casino Venuti, Cortona
- Reliefs for Villa Lante, Bagnaia
- Church of Sant’Ariano, Velletri
- Church and Monastery of Città della Pieve
- Cascata delle Marmore, Terni
- Hydraulic works in the Val di Chiana in the Romagna, Pontine marshes, Port of Fano, Aqueducts in Loreto, Perugia, and Rome
