= Ercole Ramazzani =

Italian painter

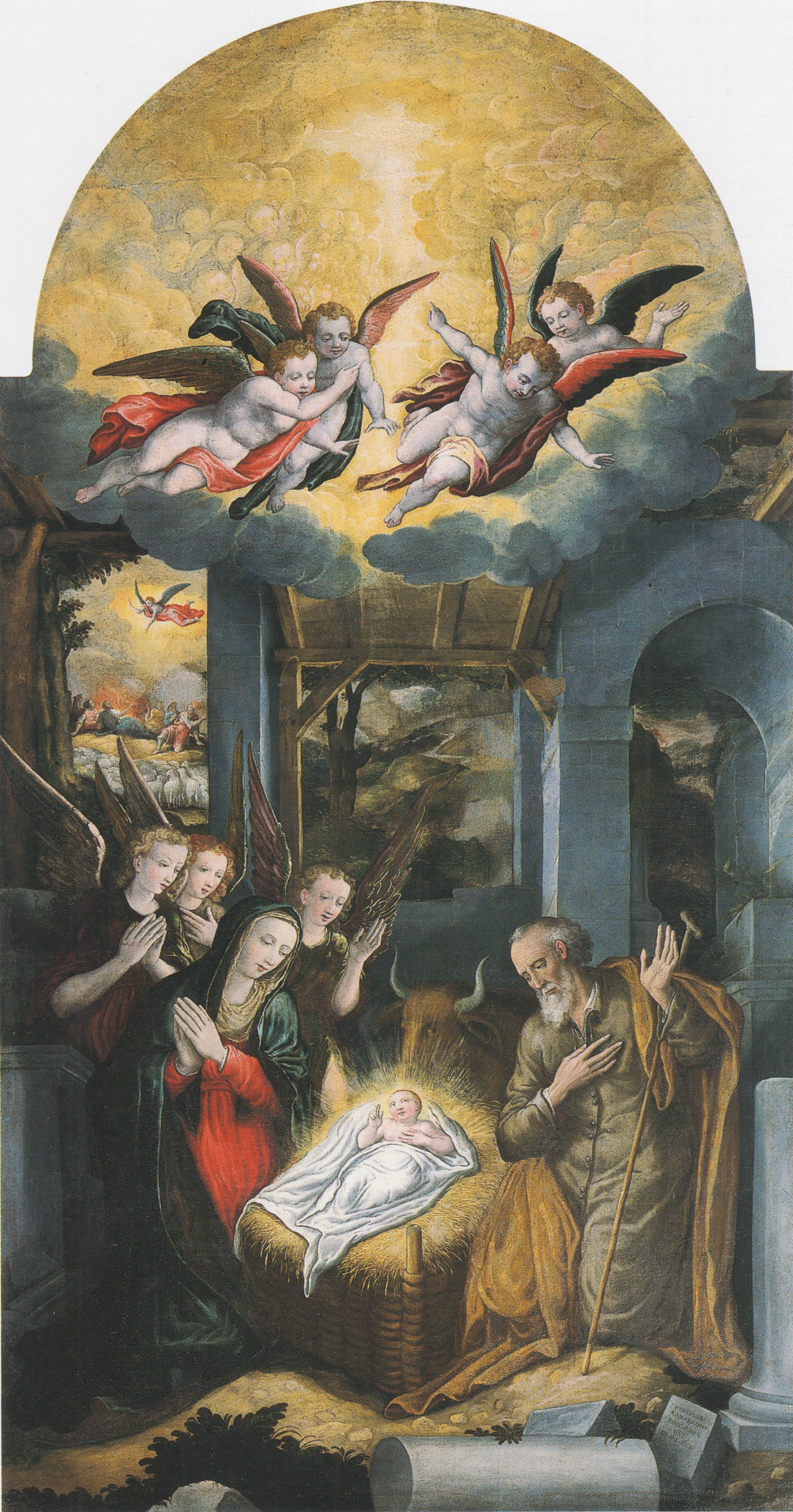

Ercole Ramazzani (1530-1598) was an Italian painter of the late-Renaissance period.

He was born at Rocca Contrada (modern Arcevia, then part of the Papal States), and was a follower of the styles of Pietro Perugino and Raphael. He is asserted to have been still alive in 1588.

Ercole was a pupil of Lorenzo Lotto for some years. At the Museo Diocesano of Jesi, he is represented by paintings depicting San Cristoforo che traghetta Gesù Bambino from the parish church of Rosora, an Ascension of Christ (1582) from the Sanctuary of Poggio San Marcello, a Madonna, Child, and Saints (1593) from the parish church of Rosora, Glory of the Virgin and Saints (1586) from Poggio San Marcello, and a Circumcision of Christ (1588) from Badia di Castelplanio.

== Sources ==
- Bryan, Michael (1889). Walter Armstrong & Robert Edmund Graves (ed.). Dictionary of Painters and Engravers, Biographical and Critical. London: George Bell and Sons. p. 344.
