= Abbondanzieri =

Abbondanzieri is an Italian surname. Notable people with the surname include:

- Marisa Abbondanzieri (born 1956), Italian politician
- Roberto Abbondanzieri (born 1972), Argentine footballer
