= Barbara, Marche =

Barbara
- Comune
- Comune di Barbara
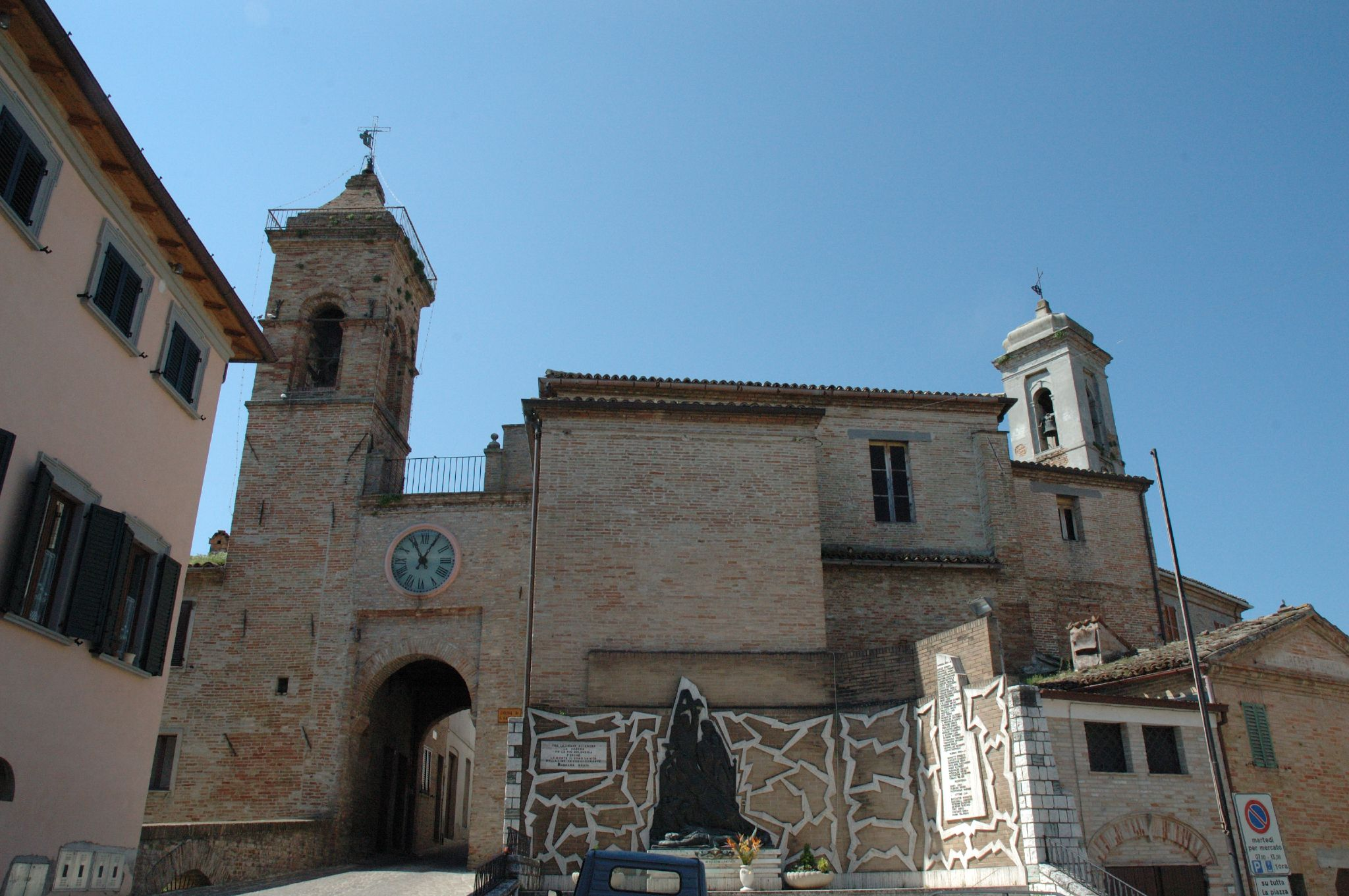
- Church with belltower and monument

- Location within Italy Location within Marche
- Coordinates: 43°34′N 13°1′E
- Country: Italy
- Region: Marche
- Province: Province of Ancona (AN)
- Frazioni: none

Government
  - Mayor: Serrani Raniero Mr.

Area
  - Total: 10.8 km^{2} (4.2 sq mi)
- Elevation: 219 m (719 ft)

Population (Dec. 2004)
  - Total: 1,484
  - Density: 137/km^{2} (356/sq mi)
- Demonym: Barbaresi
- Time zone: UTC+1 (CET)
  - Summer (DST): UTC+2 (CEST)
- Postal code: 60010
- Dialing code: 071
- Patron saint: Santa Barbara
- Saint day: December 4th
- Website: Official website

Barbara is a comune (municipality) in the Province of Ancona in the Italian region Marche, located about 40 kilometres (25 mi) west of Ancona. As of 31 December 2004, it had a population of 1,484 and an area of 10.8 square kilometres (4.2 mi^{2}).

Barbara borders the following municipalities: Arcevia, Castelleone di Suasa, Ostra Vetere, Serra de' Conti.

== Demographic evolution ==
Historical population

| Year | Pop. | ±% |
|---|---|---|
| 1861 | 1,292 | — |
| 1871 | 1,411 | +9.2% |
| 1881 | 1,344 | −4.7% |
| 1901 | 1,570 | +16.8% |
| 1911 | 1,515 | −3.5% |

| Year | Pop. | ±% |
|---|---|---|
| 1921 | 1,643 | +8.4% |
| 1931 | 1,715 | +4.4% |
| 1936 | 1,653 | −3.6% |
| 1951 | 1,656 | +0.2% |
| 1961 | 1,448 | −12.6% |

| Year | Pop. | ±% |
|---|---|---|
| 1971 | 1,276 | −11.9% |
| 1981 | 1,410 | +10.5% |
| 1991 | 1,498 | +6.2% |
| 2001 | 1,455 | −2.9% |

Source: Data from ISTAT
