= Camerata Picena =

- Comune
- Comune di Camerata Picena
- Coat of arms

- Location within Italy Location within Marche
- Coordinates: 43°35′N 13°21′E
- Country: Italy
- Region: Marche
- Province: Ancona (AN)

Government
  - Mayor: Paolo Tittarelli

Area
  - Total: 11.6 km^{2} (4.5 sq mi)

Population (28 February 2009)
  - Total: 2,239
  - Density: 193/km^{2} (500/sq mi)
- Demonym: Cameratesi
- Time zone: UTC+1 (CET)
  - Summer (DST): UTC+2 (CEST)
- Postal code: 60020
- Dialing code: 071
- Website: www.comune.cameratapicena.an.it

Camerata Picena is a comune (municipality) in the Province of Ancona in the Italian region Marche, located about 14 kilometres (9 mi) southwest of Ancona. It has a population of 2,239 as of 2009.

Camerata Picena borders the following municipalities: Agugliano, Ancona, Chiaravalle, Falconara Marittima, Jesi.
