= Treia Cathedral =

Cathedral in Treia, Italy

Coordinates: 43.3127°N 13.3116°E

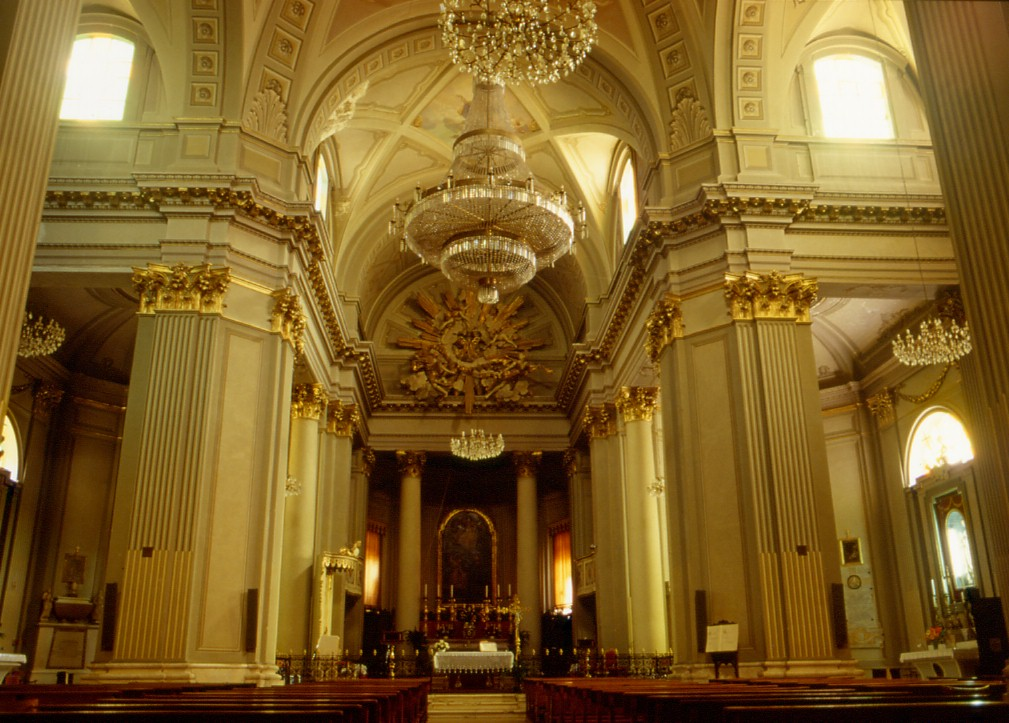
Cathedral interior

Treia Cathedral, otherwise the Church of the Annunciation (Italian: Duomo di Treia, Concattedrale della Santissma Annunziata, Chiesa della Santissima Annunziata) is a Roman Catholic cathedral in the city of Treia, Macerata, Italy, dedicated to the Annunciation. It was formerly the seat of the bishop of Treia from the creation of the diocese of Treia in 1817 to its merging into the Diocese of San Severino in 1920, and following several other mergers is now a co-cathedral of the Diocese of Macerata-Tolentino-Recanati-Cingoli-Treia.

The present structure, a re-building of a collegiate church, was erected between 1782 and 1814 to designs by the architect Andrea Vici (1743-1817), a pupil of Vanvitelli. It has a Greek cross ground plan with three naves, divided by Corinthian columns and pilasters. It has an enormous crypt nine metres high.

The sacristy of the cathedral houses a painting depicting the Apparition of the Virgin Mary near the Convent of Forano to the Blessed Pietro da Treia and the Blessed Corrado da Offida by Giacomo da Recanati. In the church itself is a bust of Pope Sixtus V by Bastiano Torrigiani. The church also houses a canvas depicting a Deposition by Vincenzo Pagani.

== Sources and external links ==
- Beni.culturali.marche.it - Chiesa della SS. Annunziata (in Italian)
- Catholic Hierarchy: Treia
- GCatholic: Treia
