= Mergo =

- Comune
- Comune di Mergo
- Location within Italy Location within Marche
- Coordinates: 43°28′N 13°2′E
- Country: Italy
- Region: Marche
- Province: Province of Ancona (AN)

Area
  - Total: 7.3 km^{2} (2.8 sq mi)

Population (Dec. 2004)
  - Total: 1,063
  - Density: 150/km^{2} (380/sq mi)
- Time zone: UTC+1 (CET)
  - Summer (DST): UTC+2 (CEST)
- Postal code: 60030
- Dialing code: 0731

Mergo is a comune (municipality) in the Province of Ancona in the Italian region Marche, located about 40 kilometres (25 mi) southwest of Ancona. As of 31 December 2004, it had a population of 1,063 and an area of 7.3 square kilometres (2.8 mi^{2}).

Mergo borders the following municipalities: Arcevia, Cupramontana, Rosora, Serra San Quirico.

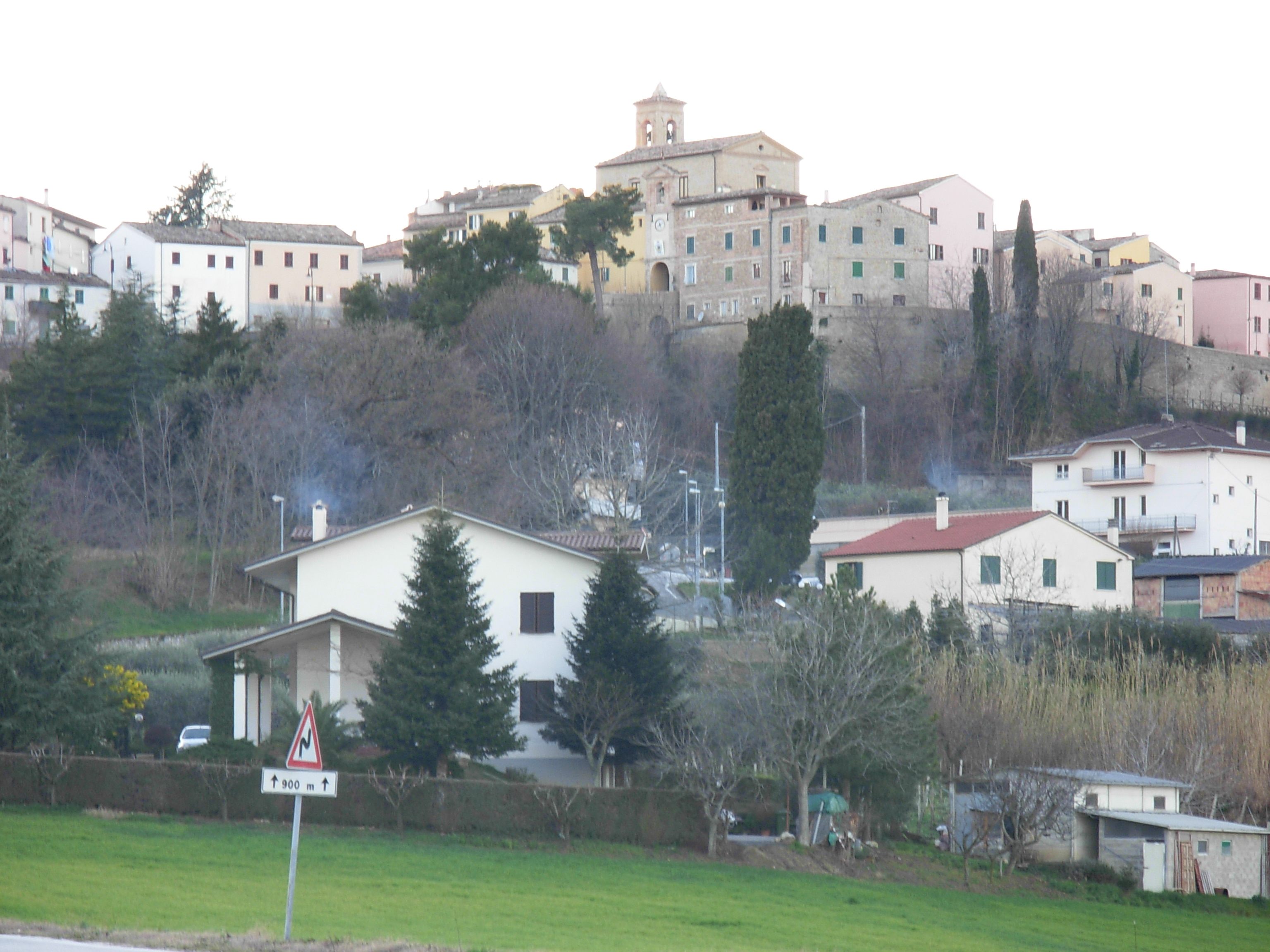
A photo of Mergo, a small castle in Ancona Province

== Demographic evolution ==
Historical population

Year	Pop.	±%
1861	860	—
1871	890	+3.5%
1881	907	+1.9%
1901	961	+6.0%
1911	1,030	+7.2%

Year	Pop.	±%
1921	1,212	+17.7%
1931	1,218	+0.5%
1936	1,210	−0.7%
1951	1,167	−3.6%
1961	993	−14.9%

Year	Pop.	±%
1971	840	−15.4%
1981	845	+0.6%
1991	875	+3.6%
2001	970	+10.9%

Source: Data from ISTAT
