= Arcevia =

- Comune
- Città di Arcevia
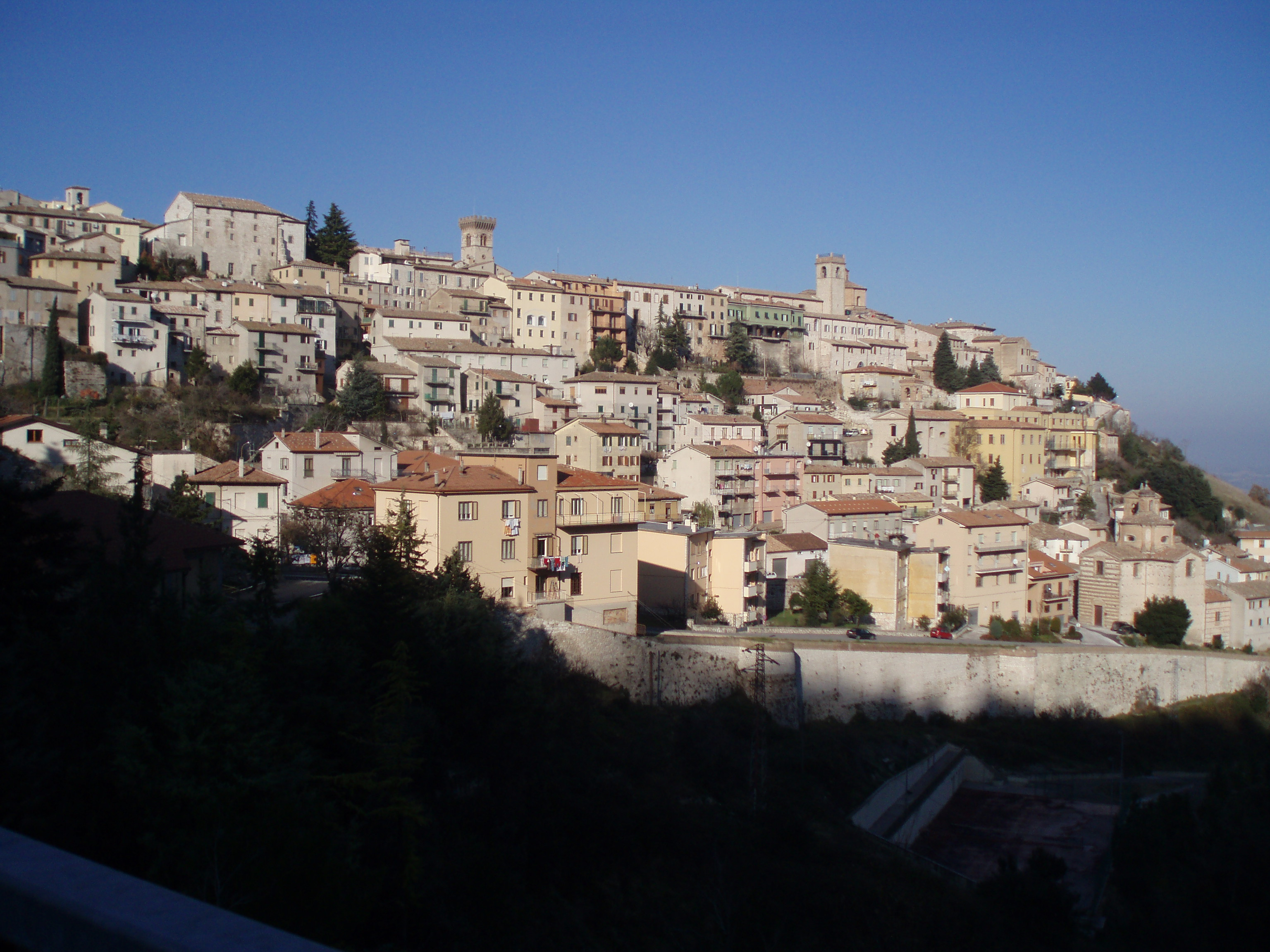

- Coat of arms

- Location of Arcevia in Italy Arcevia (Marche)
- Coordinates: 43°30′N 12°56′E
- Country: Italy
- Region: Marche
- Province: Ancona (AN)
- Frazioni: Avacelli, Castiglioni, Caudino, Colle Aprico, Conce di Arcevia, Costa, Loretello, Magnadorsa, Montale, Monte Sant'Angelo, Nidastore, Palazzo, Piticchio, Prosano, Ripalta, San Ginesio di Arcevia, San Giovanni Battista, San Pietro in Musio, Sant'Apollinare, Santo Stefano

Government
  - Mayor: Andrea Bomprezzi

Area
  - Total: 126.25 km^{2} (48.75 sq mi)
- Elevation: 535 m (1,755 ft)

Population (30 April 2017)
  - Total: 4,518
  - Density: 35.79/km^{2} (92.69/sq mi)
- Demonym: Arceviesi
- Time zone: UTC+1 (CET)
  - Summer (DST): UTC+2 (CEST)
- Postal code: 60011
- Dialing code: 0731
- Patron saint: St. Medardus
- Saint day: June 8
- Website: Official website

Arcevia is a comune in the province of Ancona of the region of Marche, central-eastern Italy. It is one of I Borghi più belli d'Italia ("The most beautiful villages of Italy").

== History ==
According to tradition, Arcevia originates from a Gallic settlement anterior to the Roman conquest of Italy; following that, it became overshadowed by more important nearby cities, such as Suasa.

Under the name of Rocca Contrada, the town was fortified by Pippin the Younger, King of the Franks, and was then donated by Charlemagne to the Papal States. In the following centuries, Arcevia played a key role in the local balance of power, located as it was at the border of the Marca di Ancona, Umbria, and the Duchy of Urbino. In 1201, Rocca Contrada proclaimed itself a commune independent from Rome, and was indeed recognised as civitas (Latin for "city") by pope Clement IV in 1266, and remained a guelph city ever since.

Known on a local scale for its military might, Rocca Contrada became entwined in the struggles between the numerous conflicts between local powers, until in the 15th century it found itself under siege by Ladislaus, King of Naples, and decided to call upon the help of famous condottiero Braccio da Montone. The latter vanquished the assailants and reconquered the castles around Arcevia they had occupied; for this he was proclaimed Signore of the city. Later on, the troops of Francesco Sforza overtook Rocca Contrada, which, after several vicissitudes, ended up under the rule of the guelph Malatesta family.

After the pacification of the Papal States in the 16th century, Rocca Contrada flourished in the Italian Renaissance: the city witnessed the institution of professorships in classical subjects, the founding of literary academies, and the birth of such significant artists as painter Ercole Ramazzani and architect Andrea Vici in the 18th century.

In 1817, pope Pius VII renamed Rocca Contrada with the current official name of Arcevia. The town passed to the Kingdom of Italy after the unification of the country under the Savoy monarchy. Townspeople fought in the two world wars, and paid for their resistance to Nazi occupation with the slaughter of seventy people on Monte Sant'Angelo (Marche) in May 1944.

== Geography and subdivisions ==
Arcevia is about 535 metres (1,755 ft) above sea level, on a hill overlooking the valley of the Misa river and the Nevola river, about 50 kilometres (31 mi) south-west from its provincial and regional capital, Ancona.

Arcevia borders the following municipalities: Barbara, Castelleone di Suasa, Genga, Mergo, Montecarotto, Pergola, Rosora, San Lorenzo in Campo, Sassoferrato, Serra de' Conti, and Serra San Quirico.

== Notable people ==
- Angelo Rocca (1545-1620) - librarian and bishop of Thagaste since 1605
- Marisa Abbondanzieri (1956-) - politician

== Twin towns ==
- Ribnica, Slovenia
