= Belvedere Ostrense =

- Comune
- Comune di Belvedere Ostrense
- Coat of arms

- Location within Italy Location within Marche
- Coordinates: 43°35′N 13°10′E
- Country: Italy
- Region: Marche
- Province: Ancona (AN)
- Frazioni: Fornace, Madonna del Sole

Government
  - Mayor: Riccardo Piccioni

Area
  - Total: 29.45 km^{2} (11.37 sq mi)
- Elevation: 251 m (823 ft)

Population (30 April 2017)
  - Total: 2,191
  - Density: 74.40/km^{2} (192.7/sq mi)
- Demonym: Belvederesi
- Time zone: UTC+1 (CET)
  - Summer (DST): UTC+2 (CEST)
- Postal code: 60030
- Dialing code: 0731
- Patron saint: St. Peter
- Saint day: June 29
- Website: Official website

Belvedere Ostrense is a comune (municipality) in the Province of Ancona in the Italian region Marche, located about 30 kilometres (19 mi) west of Ancona.

Belvedere Ostrense borders the following municipalities: Castelplanio, Maiolati Spontini, Montecarotto, Morro d'Alba, Ostra, Poggio San Marcello, San Marcello, Senigallia.
