= Serra de' Conti =

- Comune
- Comune di Serra de' Conti
- Location within Italy Location within Marche
- Coordinates: 43°33′N 13°2′E
- Country: Italy
- Region: Marche
- Province: Ancona (AN)
- Frazioni: Osteria

Government
  - Mayor: Letizia Perticaroli

Area
  - Total: 24.51 km^{2} (9.46 sq mi)
- Elevation: 261 m (856 ft)

Population (2013)
  - Total: 3,678
  - Density: 150.1/km^{2} (388.7/sq mi)
- Demonym: Serrani
- Time zone: UTC+1 (CET)
  - Summer (DST): UTC+2 (CEST)
- Postal code: 60030
- Dialing code: 0731
- Patron saint: Bl. Gherardo di Serradeconti
- Website: Official website

Serra de' Conti is a comune (municipality) in the Province of Ancona in the Italian region Marche, located about 40 kilometres (25 mi) west of Ancona.

Serra de' Conti borders the following municipalities: Arcevia, Barbara, Montecarotto, Ostra Vetere.

== Demographic evolution ==
Historical population

| Year | Pop. | ±% |
|---|---|---|
| 1861 | 2,208 | — |
| 1871 | 2,142 | −3.0% |
| 1881 | 2,165 | +1.1% |
| 1901 | 2,543 | +17.5% |
| 1911 | 3,052 | +20.0% |

| Year | Pop. | ±% |
|---|---|---|
| 1921 | 3,436 | +12.6% |
| 1931 | 3,278 | −4.6% |
| 1936 | 3,277 | −0.0% |
| 1951 | 3,218 | −1.8% |
| 1961 | 2,921 | −9.2% |

| Year | Pop. | ±% |
|---|---|---|
| 1971 | 2,700 | −7.6% |
| 1981 | 3,129 | +15.9% |
| 1991 | 3,312 | +5.8% |
| 2001 | 3,464 | +4.6% |

Source: Data from ISTAT
