= Monte Roberto =

- Comune
- Comune di Monte Roberto
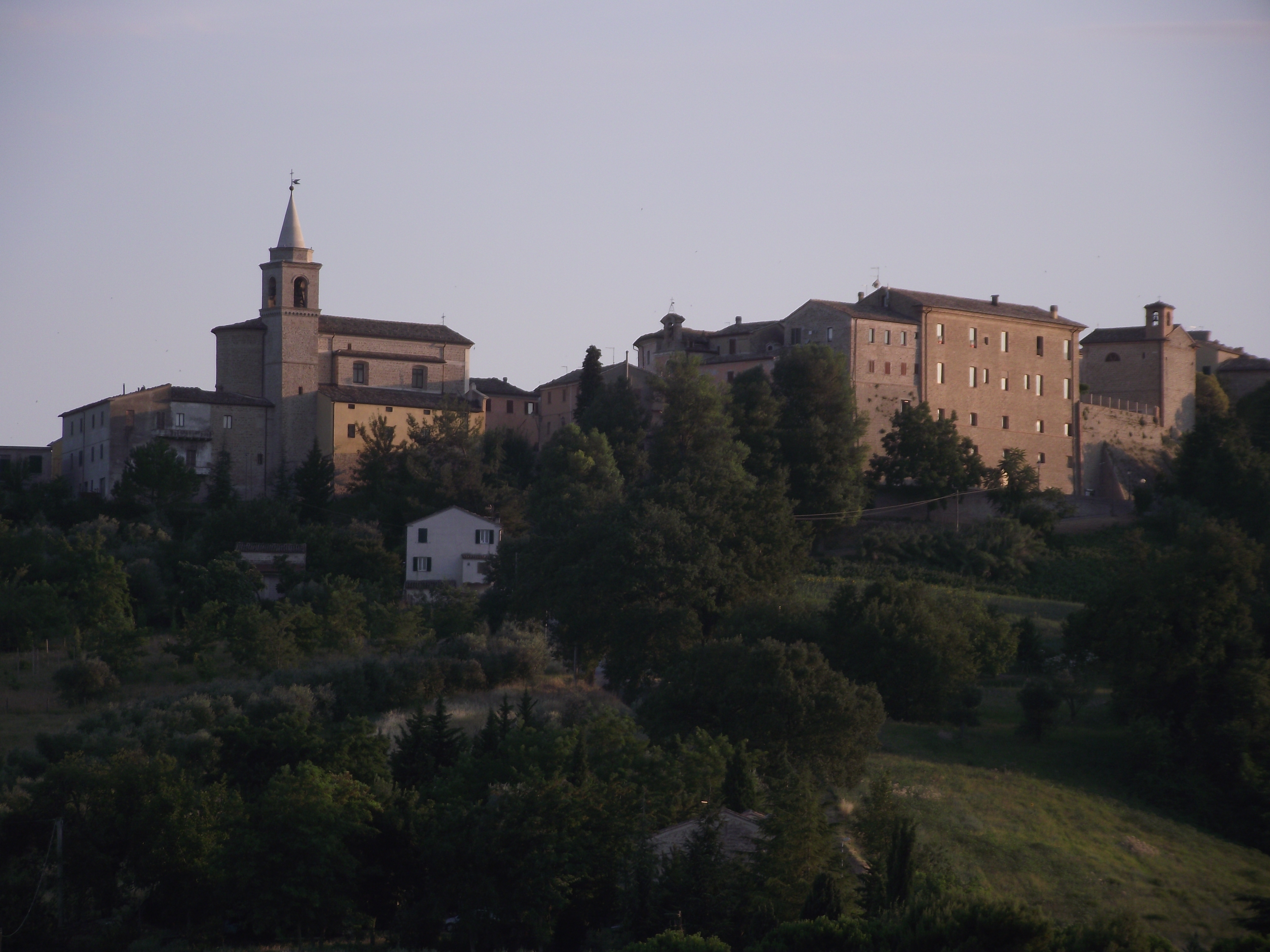

- Location within Italy Location within Marche
- Coordinates: 43°29′N 13°8′E
- Country: Italy
- Region: Marche
- Province: Ancona (AN)

Government
  - Mayor: Gabriele Giampaoletti

Area
  - Total: 13.51 km^{2} (5.22 sq mi)
- Elevation: 348 m (1,142 ft)

Population (30 November 2017)
  - Total: 3,097
  - Density: 229.2/km^{2} (593.7/sq mi)
- Demonym: Monterobertesi
- Time zone: UTC+1 (CET)
  - Summer (DST): UTC+2 (CEST)
- Postal code: 60030
- Dialing code: 0731
- Patron saint: St. Sylvester
- Saint day: 31 December
- Website: Official website

Monte Roberto is a comune (municipality) in the Province of Ancona in the Italian region Marche, located about 35 kilometres (22 mi) southwest of Ancona.

Monte Roberto borders the following municipalities: Castelbellino, Cupramontana, Jesi, Maiolati Spontini, San Paolo di Jesi.

== Twin towns ==
- Fontanil, France, since 1992
