= Montecarotto =

- Comune
- Comune di Montecarotto
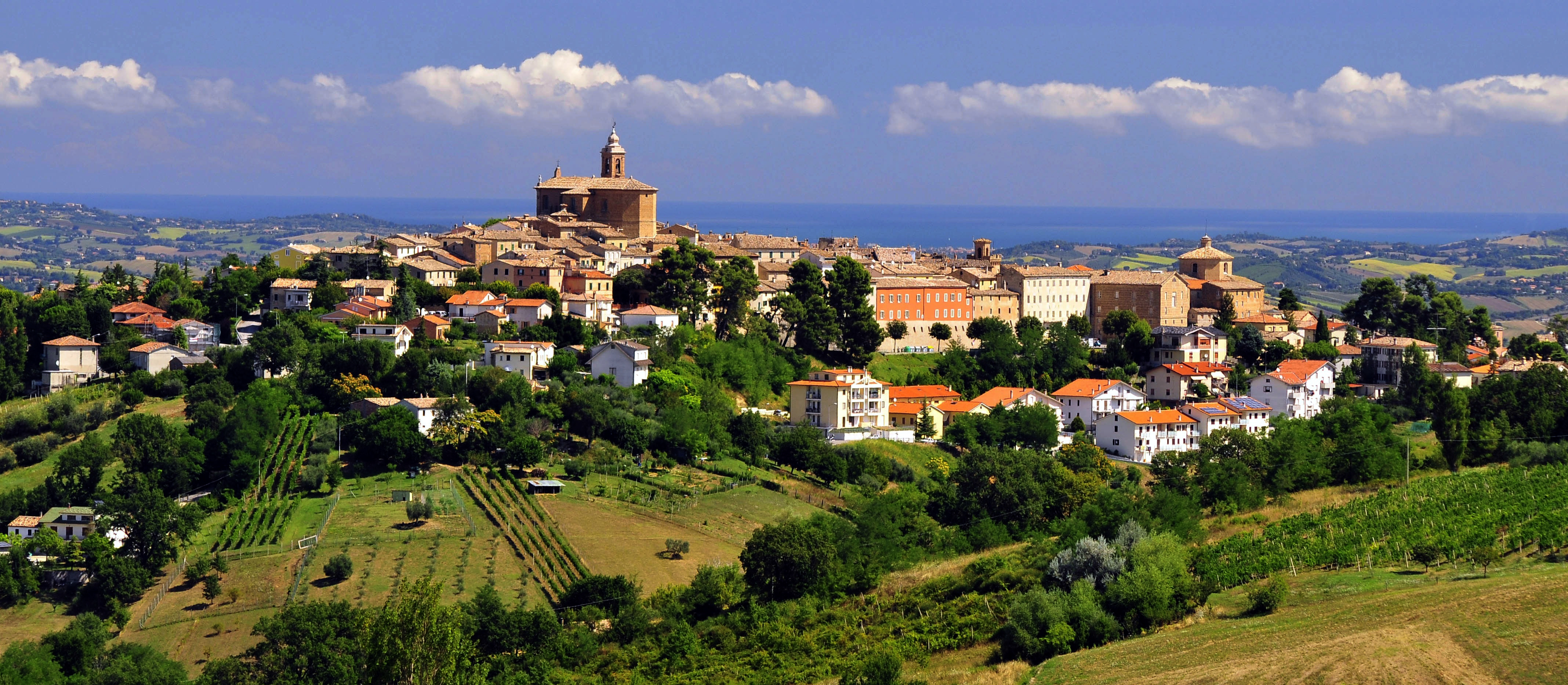

- Location within Italy Location within Marche
- Coordinates: 43°32′N 13°4′E
- Country: Italy
- Region: Marche
- Province: Ancona (AN)

Government
  - Mayor: Giuseppe Paoloni

Area
  - Total: 24.07 km^{2} (9.29 sq mi)
- Elevation: 385 m (1,263 ft)

Population (2025)
  - Total: 1,855
  - Density: 77.07/km^{2} (199.6/sq mi)
- Demonym: Montecarottesi
- Time zone: UTC+1 (CET)
  - Summer (DST): UTC+2 (CEST)
- Postal code: 60036
- Dialing code: 0731
- Patron saint: St. Placidus
- Saint day: October 5

Montecarotto is a comune (municipality) in the Province of Ancona in the Italian region Marche, located about 40 kilometres (25 mi) west of Ancona, mostly known internationally for the annual Blackmoon festival, a renowned goa and psytrance happening. As of 30 April 2025, it had a population of 1,855 and an area of 24.1 square kilometres (9.3 mi^{2}).

Montecarotto borders the following municipalities: Arcevia, Belvedere Ostrense, Ostra, Ostra Vetere, Poggio San Marcello, Rosora, Serra de' Conti.

== Demographic evolution ==
Historical population

Year	Pop.	±%
1861	2,707	—
1871	2,792	+3.1%
1881	2,827	+1.3%
1901	3,349	+18.5%
1911	3,546	+5.9%
1921	3,671	+3.5%

Year	Pop.	±%
1931	3,590	−2.2%
1936	3,618	+0.8%
1951	3,763	+4.0%
1961	3,134	−16.7%
1971	2,496	−20.4%
1981	2,399	−3.9%

Year	Pop.	±%
1991	2,181	−9.1%
2001	2,176	−0.2%
2011	2,080	−4.4%
2021	1,860	−10.6%

Source: Data from ISTAT

== Gallery ==
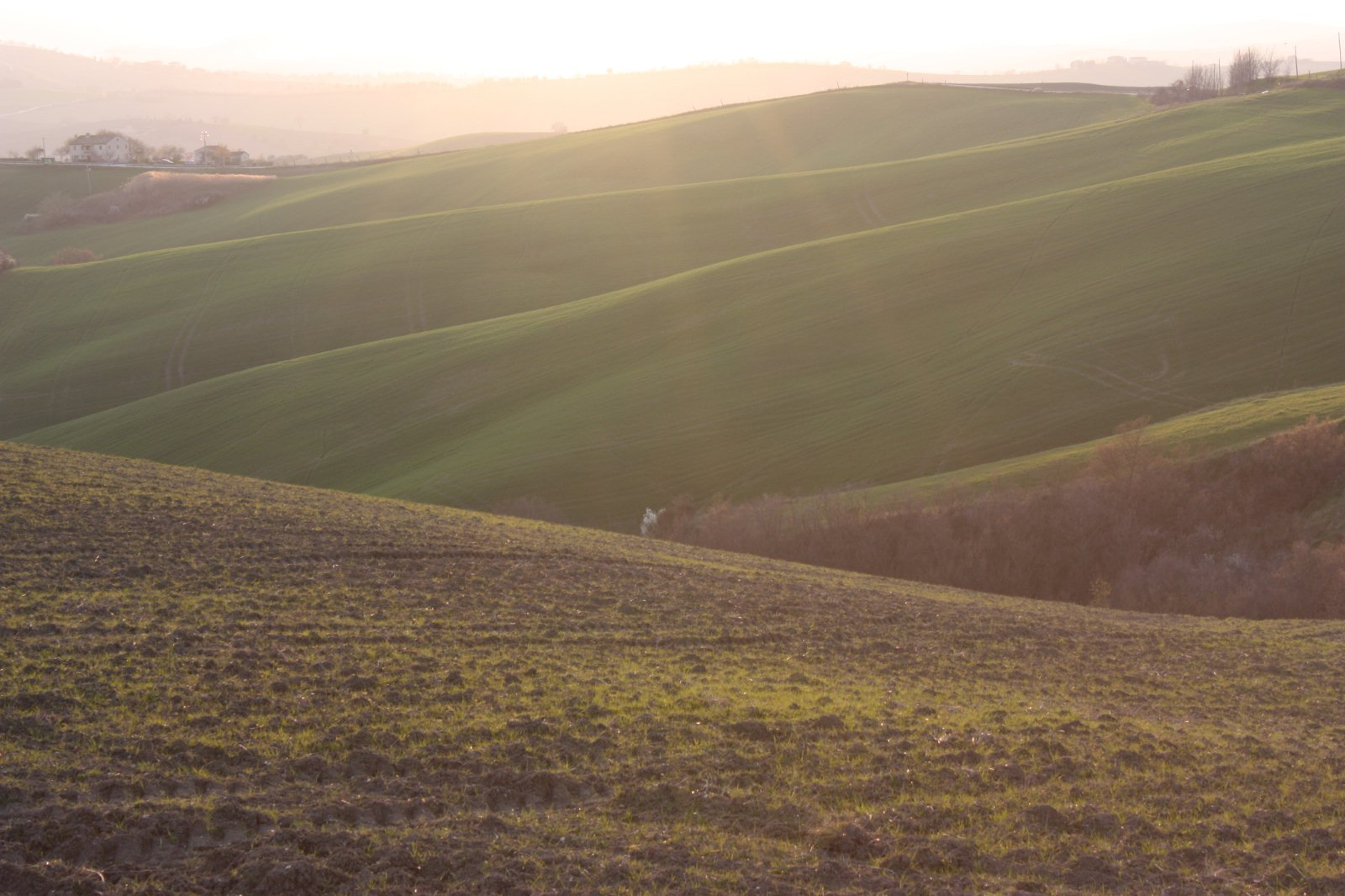

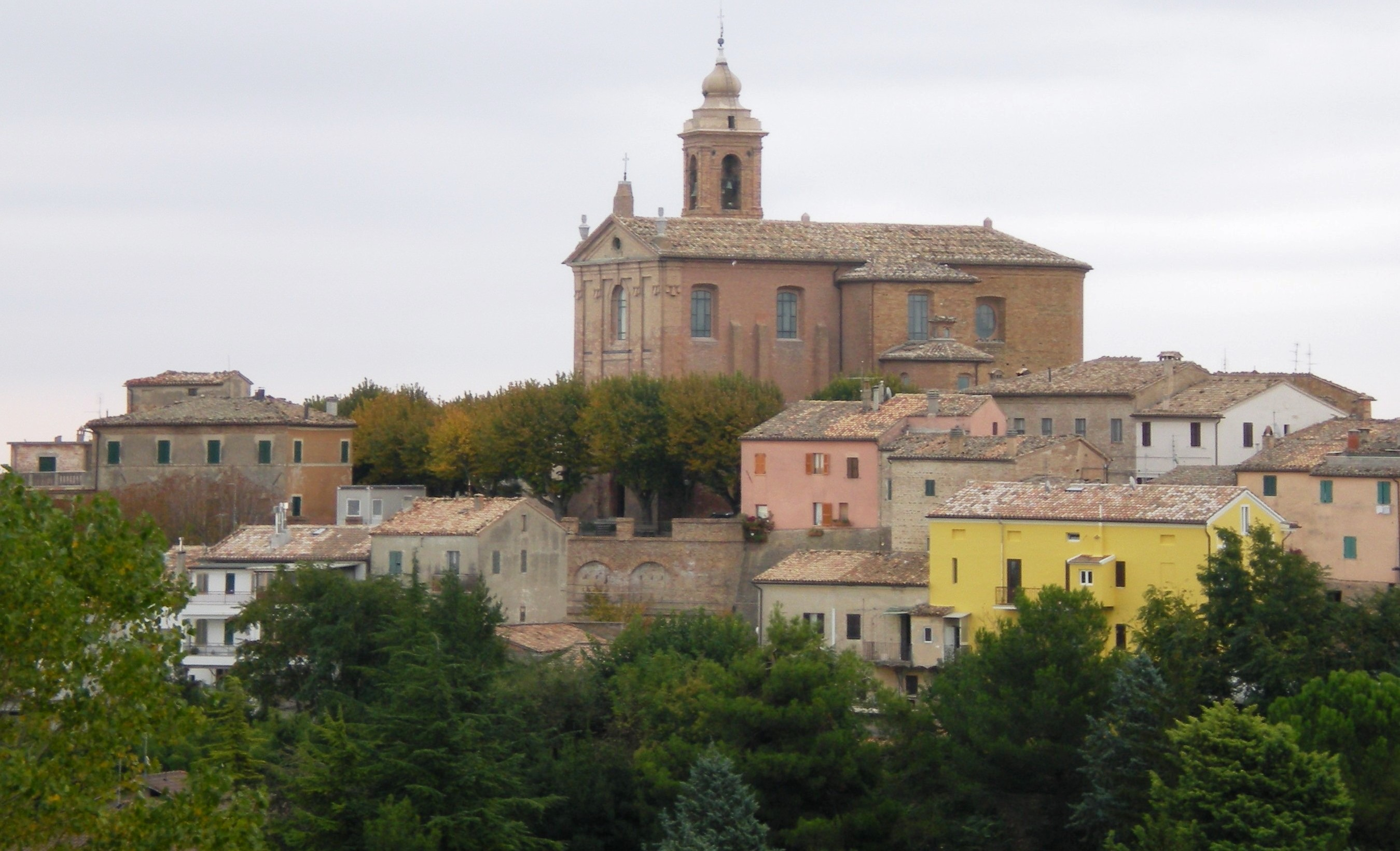

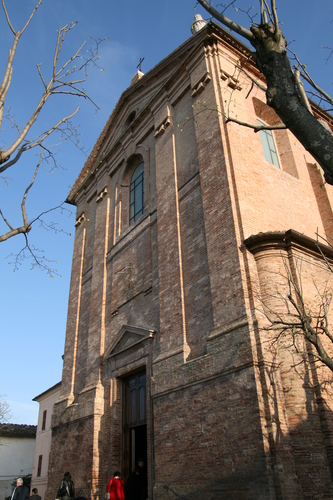

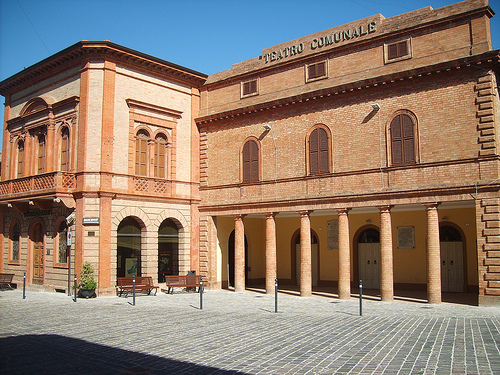

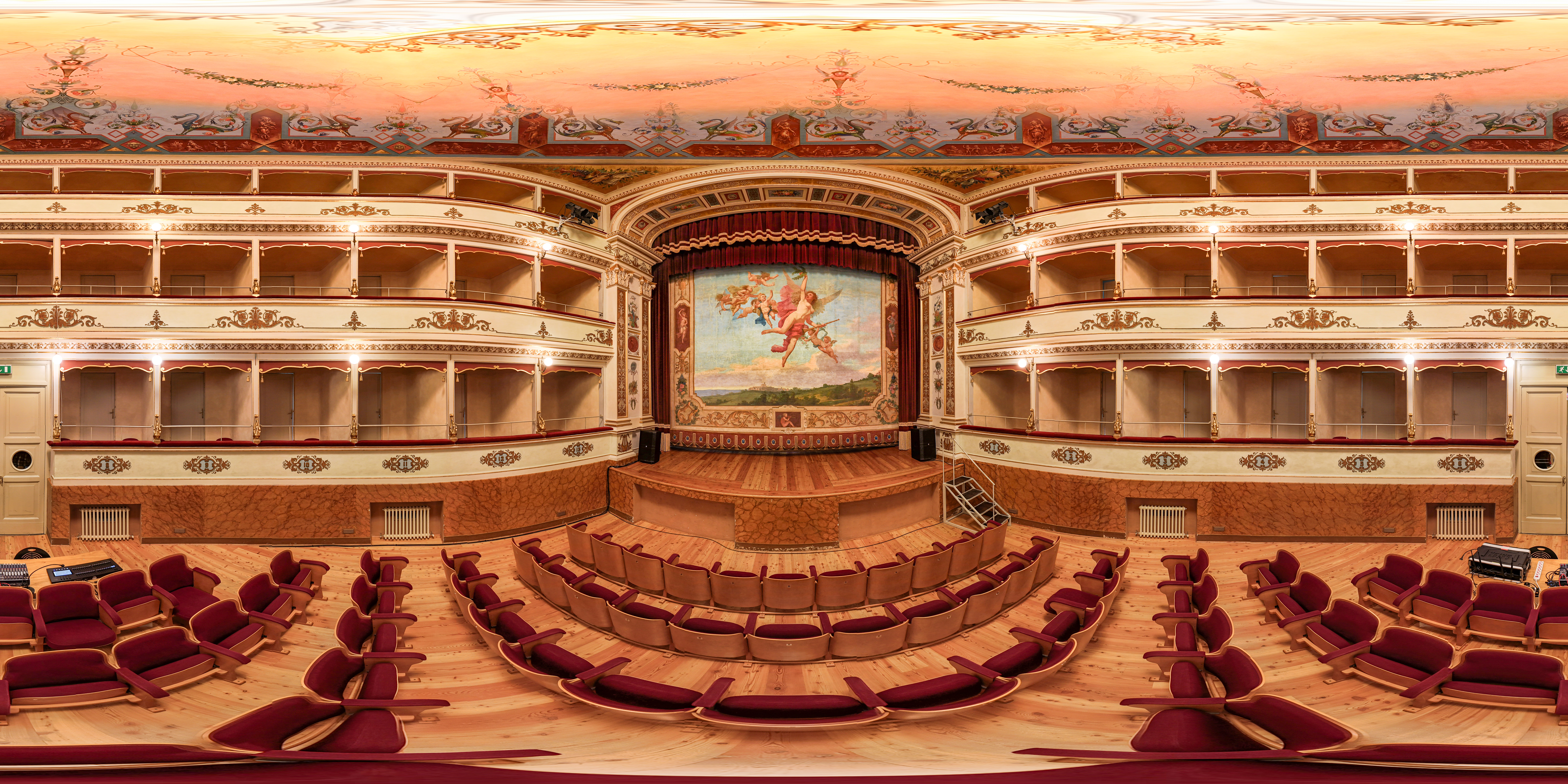

== See also ==
- Mail art
