= Camerano =

- Comune
- Comune di Camerano
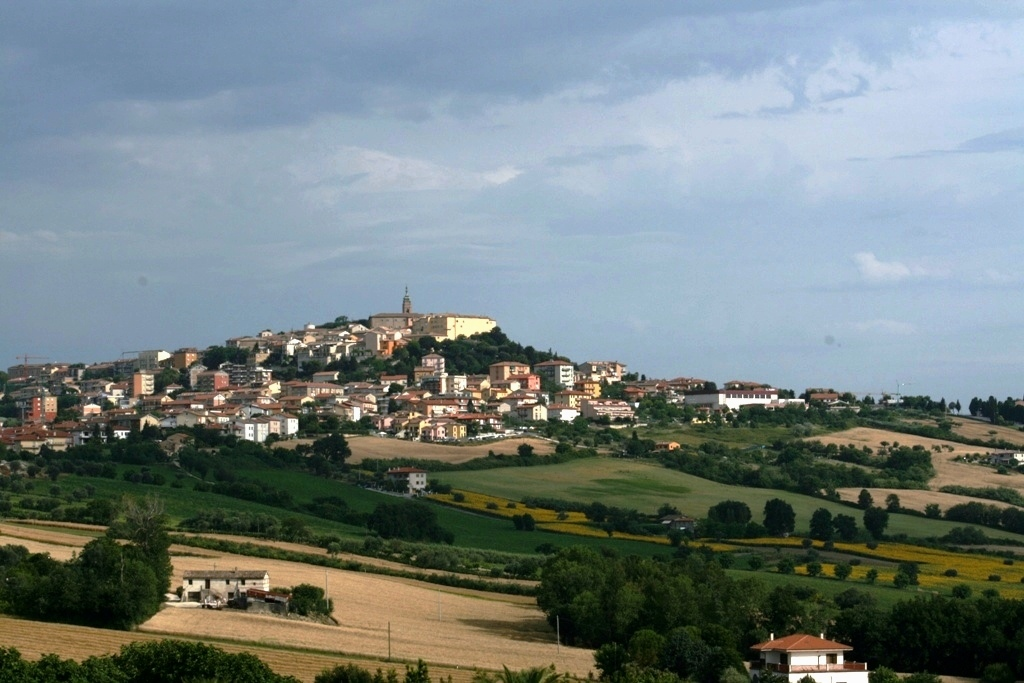

- Coat of arms

- Location within Italy Location within Marche
- Coordinates: 43°32′N 13°33′E
- Country: Italy
- Region: Marche
- Province: Ancona (AN)
- Frazioni: Aspio, San Germano

Government
  - Mayor: Annalisa Del Bello

Area
  - Total: 19.8 km^{2} (7.6 sq mi)
- Elevation: 231 m (758 ft)

Population (Feb. 2009)
  - Total: 7,207
  - Density: 364/km^{2} (943/sq mi)
- Demonym: Cameranesi
- Time zone: UTC+1 (CET)
  - Summer (DST): UTC+2 (CEST)
- Postal code: 60021
- Dialing code: 071
- Website: Official website

Camerano is a comune (municipality) in the Province of Ancona in the Italian region Marche, located about 10 kilometres (6 mi) southeast of Ancona.

Camerano borders the following municipalities: Ancona, Castelfidardo, Osimo, Sirolo.

Camerano is most notable for the extensive tunnel system that lies underneath most of the old city. These tunnels were constructed in the sandstone bedrock of Camera, with constructions happening piecemeal from the Roman era, up until the 1800s. Although the cause for this tunnel building was originally thought to have been as wine storage cellars, later exploration has revealed that these tunnels began with the Romans, and then were greatly enlarged to function as a refuge from the Moorish incursions into Italy during the early medieval period. Later, the tunnels functioned as a city in their own right, complete with churches (identifiable from the bas-relief Greek crosses engraved on the ceilings), wells, and storage areas. Most recently, the caves functioned as a bomb shelter, holding 3,000 people for 8 days in 1944.
