= Marisa Abbondanzieri =

Italian politician

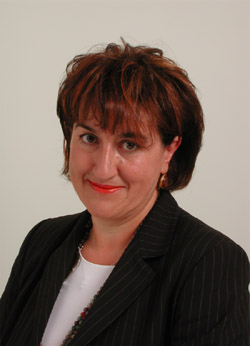

Member of the Chamber of Deputies
- In office 1999–2006
- Preceded by: Nilde Iotti
- Constituency: Marche

Mayor of Arcevia
- In office 1995–1999
- Preceded by: Nazzareno Badiali
- Succeeded by: Silvio Purgatori
- In office 1988–1990
- Succeeded by: Nazzareno Badiali

Personal details
- Born: 14 January 1956 (age 70) Arcevia, Italy
- Party: Democratic Party (since 2007); Democrats of the Left (1998–2007); Democratic Party of the Left (1991–1998); Italian Communist Party (1976–1991)
- Occupation: Teacher

Marisa Abbondanzieri (born 14 January 1956, in Arcevia) is an Italian politician.

She worked as an elementary school teacher. She was elected to the Italian Chamber of Deputies in 1999, succeeding Nilde Iotti and was reconfirmed as a representative in 2001 for the Democrats of the Left in the Marche. After that party was dissolved in 2007, she joined the Democratic Party.

She was a member of the Council of Europe from January 23, 2006, until September 22, 2006.
