= Agugliano =

- Comune
- Comune di Agugliano
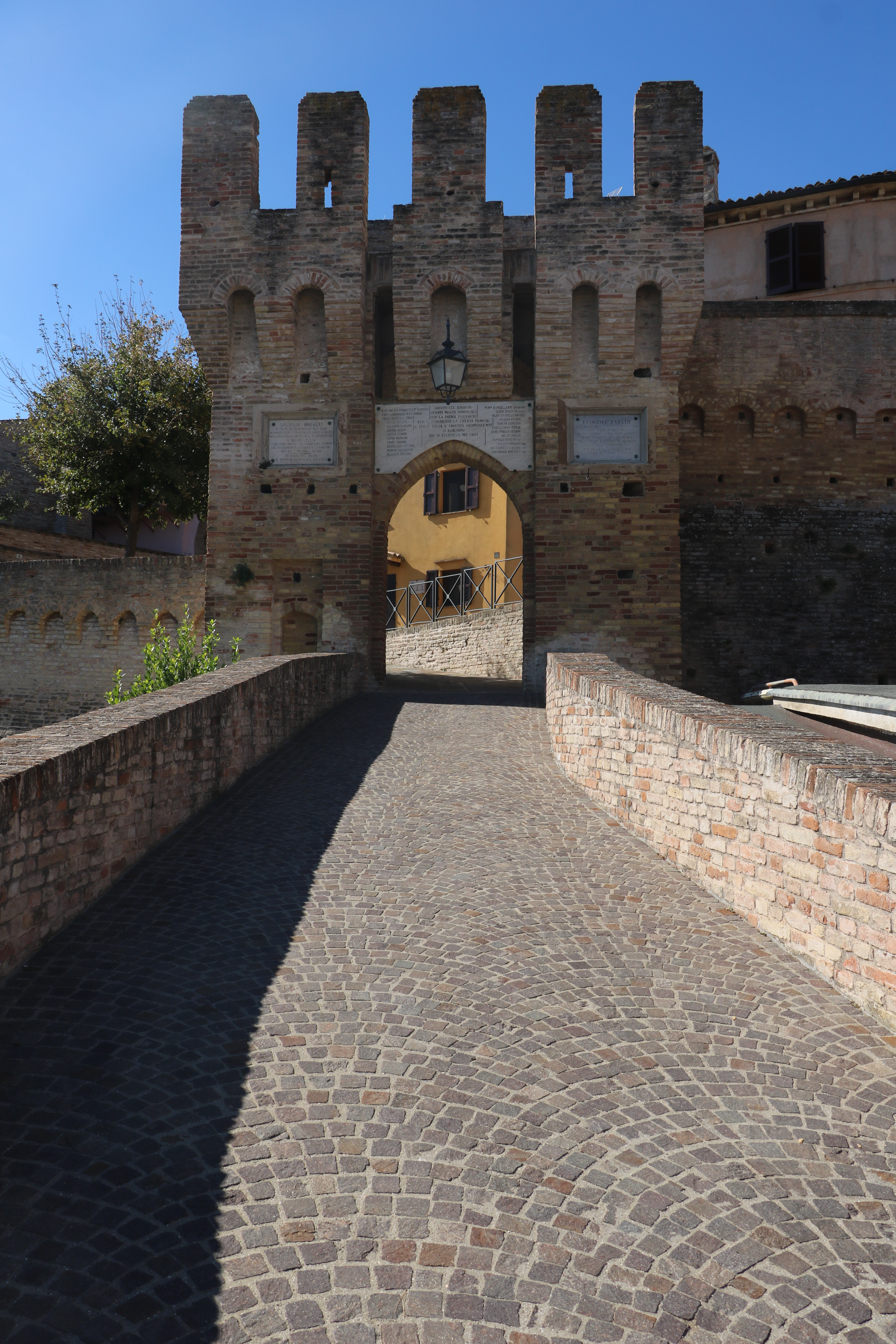
- Castel d'Emilio

- Location of Agugliano in Italy Agugliano (Marche)
- Coordinates: 43°33′N 13°23′E
- Country: Italy
- Region: Marche
- Province: Province of Ancona (AN)
- Frazioni: Castel D'Emilio, la Chiusa, il Molino

Government
  - Mayor: Thomas Bracon

Area
  - Total: 21.89 km^{2} (8.45 sq mi)
- Elevation: 203 m (666 ft)

Population (30 September 2017)
  - Total: 4,821
  - Density: 220.2/km^{2} (570.4/sq mi)
- Demonym: Aguglianesi
- Time zone: UTC+1 (CET)
  - Summer (DST): UTC+2 (CEST)
- Postal code: 60020
- Dialing code: 071
- Website: Official website

Agugliano is a comune (municipality) in the Province of Ancona in the Italian region Marche, located about 13 kilometres (8 mi) southwest of Ancona.

Agugliano borders the following municipalities: Ancona, Camerata Picena, Jesi, Polverigi.
