= San Paolo di Jesi =

- Comune
- Comune di San Paolo di Jesi
- Coat of arms

- Location within Italy Location within Marche
- Coordinates: 43°27′N 13°10′E
- Country: Italy
- Region: Marche
- Province: Ancona (AN)

Government
  - Mayor: Sandro Barcaglioni

Area
  - Total: 10.11 km^{2} (3.90 sq mi)
- Elevation: 224 m (735 ft)

Population (31 December 2010)
  - Total: 916
  - Density: 90.6/km^{2} (235/sq mi)
- Demonym: Sanpaolesi
- Time zone: UTC+1 (CET)
  - Summer (DST): UTC+2 (CEST)
- Postal code: 60038
- Dialing code: 0731

San Paolo di Jesi is a comune (municipality) in the Province of Ancona in the Italian region Marche, located about 35 kilometres (22 mi) southwest of Ancona.

San Paolo di Jesi borders the following municipalities: Cupramontana, Jesi, Monte Roberto, Staffolo.
