= San Marcello, Marche =

San Marcello
- Comune
- Comune di San Marcello
- Location within Italy Location within Marche
- Coordinates: 43°35′N 13°12′E
- Country: Italy
- Region: Marche
- Province: Ancona (AN)
- Frazioni: Acquasanta

Government
  - Mayor: Graziano Lapi

Area
  - Total: 25.78 km^{2} (9.95 sq mi)
- Elevation: 231 m (758 ft)

Population (31 December 2019)
  - Total: 2,000
  - Density: 78/km^{2} (200/sq mi)
- Demonym: Sammarcellesi
- Time zone: UTC+1 (CET)
  - Summer (DST): UTC+2 (CEST)
- Postal code: 60030
- Dialing code: 0731
- Patron saint: Pope Marcellus I
- Saint day: January 16
- Website: Official website

San Marcello is a comune (municipality) in the Province of Ancona in the Italian region Marche, located about 25 kilometres (16 mi) west of Ancona.

San Marcello borders the following municipalities: Belvedere Ostrense, Jesi, Maiolati Spontini, Monsano, Monte San Vito, Morro d'Alba.

Founded in 1234 by a community of people from Jesi, it still has a well preserved line of walls. It is interesting to visit the Renaissance Palazzo Marcelli, the parish church, the Ferrari theatre, the Saint Mary church.

The castle is surrounded by a hilly landscape with many olive trees and vineyards.
