= Cupramontana =

Municipality in Marche, Italy

- Comune
- Comune di Cupramontana
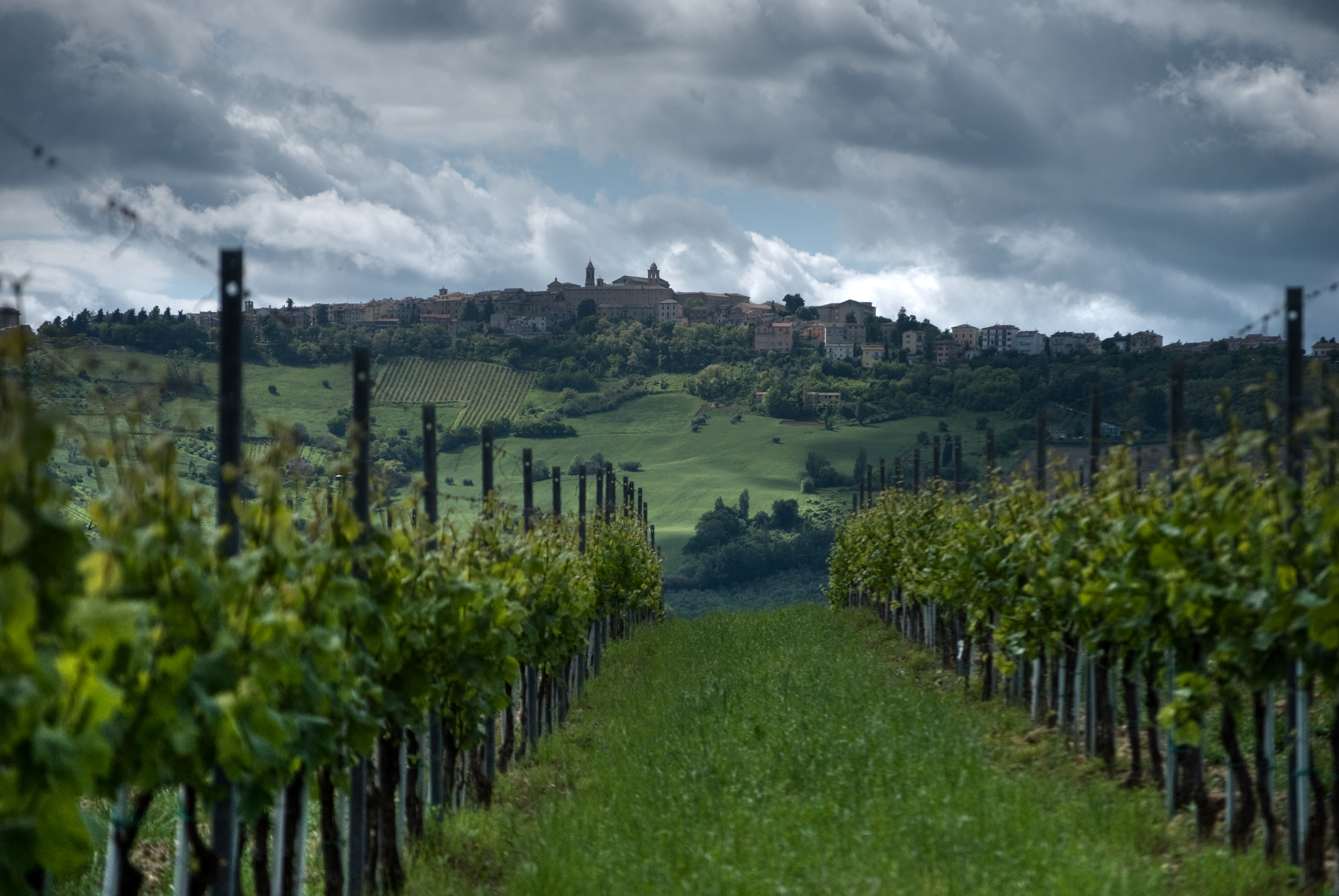

- Coat of arms

- Location within Italy Location within Marche
- Coordinates: 43°27′N 13°7′E
- Country: Italy
- Region: Marche
- Province: Ancona (AN)
- Frazioni: Poggio Cupro

Government
  - Mayor: Luigi Cerioni

Area
  - Total: 26.9 km^{2} (10.4 sq mi)
- Elevation: 505 m (1,657 ft)

Population (30 June 2017)
  - Total: 4,628
  - Density: 172/km^{2} (446/sq mi)
- Demonym: Cuprensi
- Time zone: UTC+1 (CET)
  - Summer (DST): UTC+2 (CEST)
- Postal code: 60034
- Dialing code: 0731
- Website: Official website

Cupramontana is a comune (municipality) in the Province of Ancona in the Italian region Marche, located about 35 kilometres (22 mi) southwest of Ancona.

Cupramontana borders the following municipalities: Apiro, Maiolati Spontini, Mergo, Monte Roberto, Rosora, San Paolo di Jesi, Serra San Quirico, Staffolo. It takes its name from Cupra, a fertility goddess of the pre-Roman population of the Piceni. It had earlier been called Massaccio but later resumed its ancient name.
