= Rosora =

- Comune
- Comune di Rosora
- Coat of arms

- Location within Italy Location within Marche
- Coordinates: 43°29′N 13°4′E
- Country: Italy
- Region: Marche
- Province: Ancona (AN)
- Frazioni: Angeli

Government
  - Mayor: Fausto Sassi

Area
  - Total: 9.41 km^{2} (3.63 sq mi)
- Elevation: 381 m (1,250 ft)

Population (31 December 2013)
  - Total: 2,008
  - Density: 213/km^{2} (553/sq mi)
- Demonym: Rosorani
- Time zone: UTC+1 (CET)
  - Summer (DST): UTC+2 (CEST)
- Postal code: 60030
- Dialing code: 0731
- Patron saint: St. Michael Archangel
- Saint day: September 29
- Website: Official website

Rosora is a comune (municipality) in the Province of Ancona in the Italian region Marche, located about 40 kilometres (25 mi) southwest of Ancona.

Rosora borders the following municipalities: Arcevia, Castelplanio, Cupramontana, Maiolati Spontini, Mergo, Montecarotto, Poggio San Marcello.

== History ==
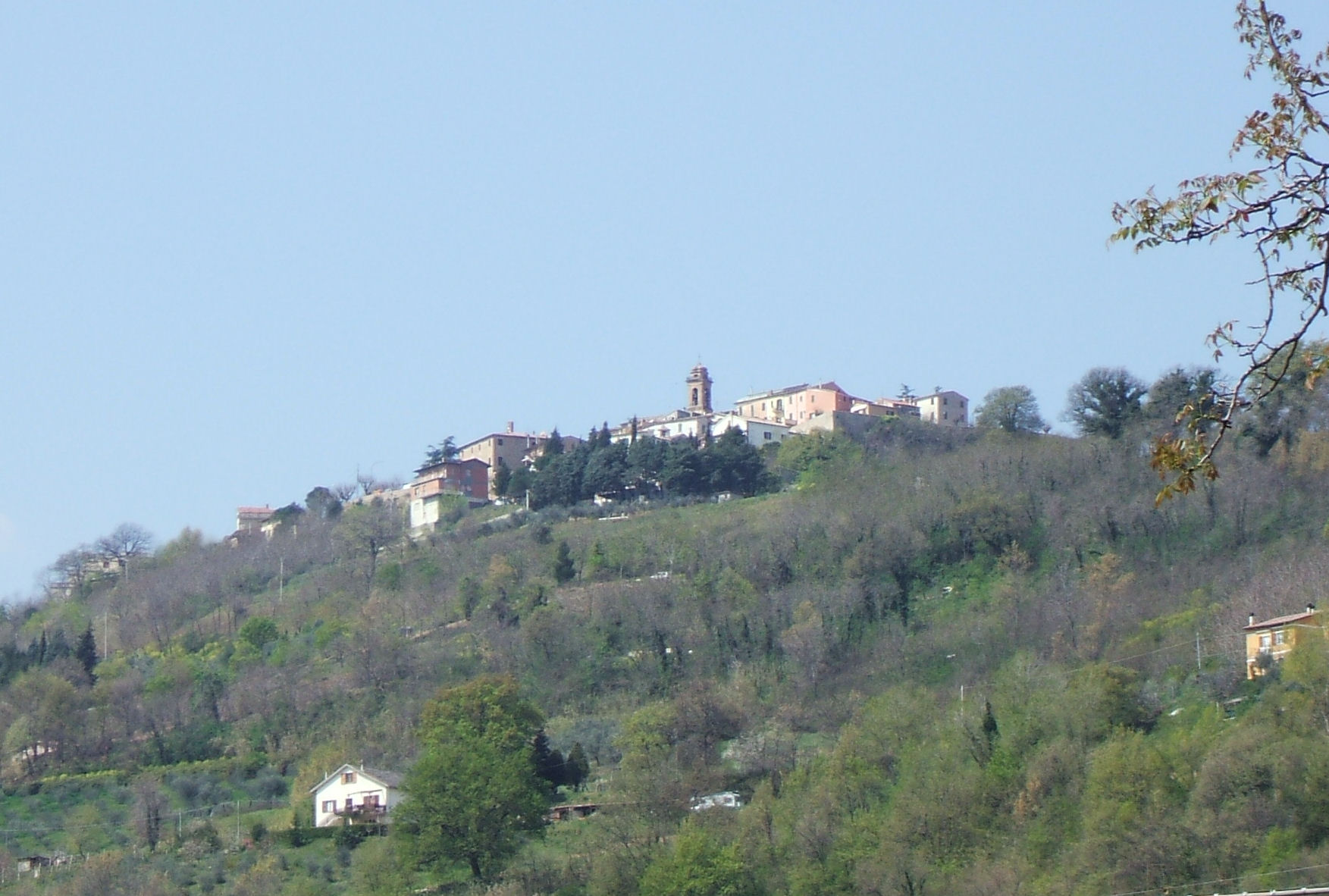
View of Rosora

The origins of Rosora are connected to the Lombards, who built here a castrum (castle), probably over a pre-existing Roman structure. In the Middle Ages it was a commune, later annexed to that of Jesi. It was under the Papal States until 1860, when it became part of the Kingdom of Italy.

== Main sights ==
- Castle, with a 15th-century tower, part of the walls and tunnels from the primitive building.
