= Maiolati Spontini =

- Comune
- Comune di Maiolati Spontini
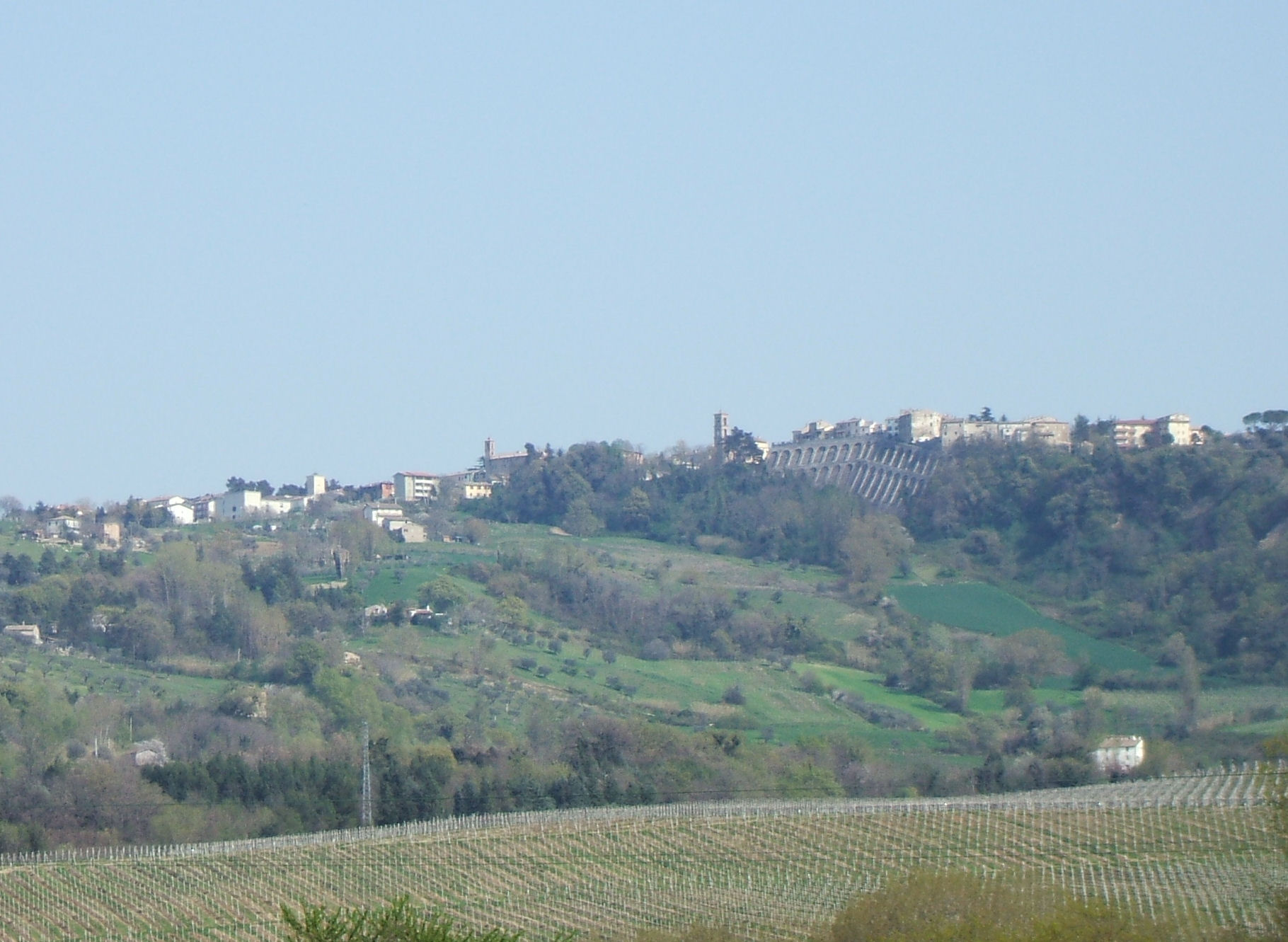

- Coat of arms

- Location within Italy Location within Marche
- Coordinates: 43°29′N 13°7′E
- Country: Italy
- Region: Marche
- Province: Ancona (AN)
- Frazioni: Moie, Monteschiavo, Scisciano, Scorcelletti

Government
  - Mayor: Umberto Domizioli

Area
  - Total: 21.49 km^{2} (8.30 sq mi)
- Elevation: 198 m (650 ft)

Population (30 September 2017)
  - Total: 6,212
  - Density: 289.1/km^{2} (748.7/sq mi)
- Demonym: Maiolatesi
- Time zone: UTC+1 (CET)
  - Summer (DST): UTC+2 (CEST)
- Postal code: 60030
- Dialing code: 0731
- Website: Official website

Maiolati Spontini is a comune (municipality) in the Province of Ancona in the Italian region Marche, located about 35 kilometres (22 mi) southwest of Ancona. It is the birthplace of musician Gaspare Spontini, whose name has been conjoined with the commune's ancient name, Maiolati.

Maiolati Spontini borders the following municipalities: Belvedere Ostrense, Castelbellino, Castelplanio, Cupramontana, Jesi, Monte Roberto, Rosora, San Marcello.

The municipality also includes Moie, a populous town that developed along the Esino Valley during the second half of the 20th century.
