= Castelbellino =

- Comune
- Comune di Castelbellino
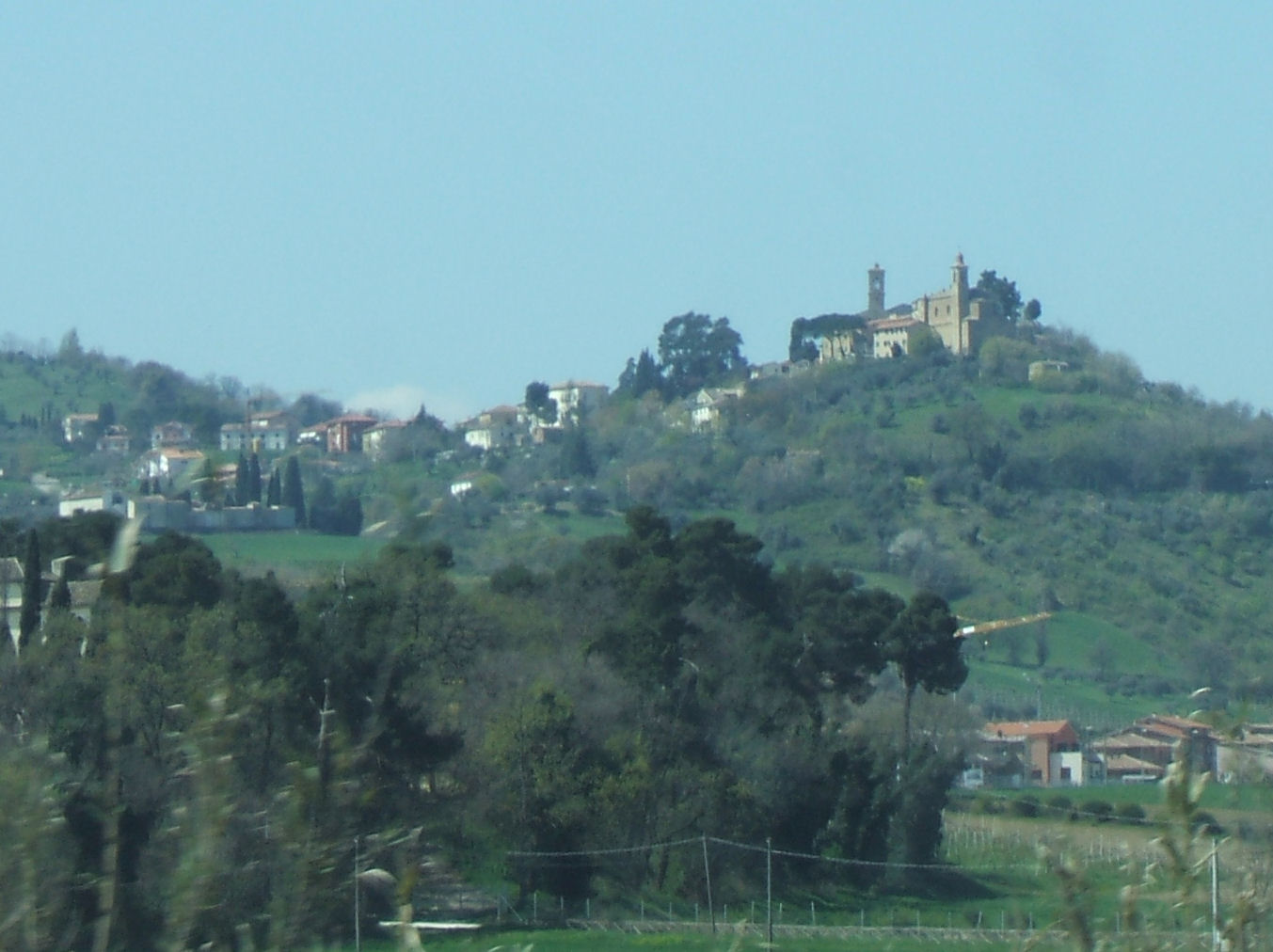
- Vista of Castelbellino

- Location within Italy Location within Marche
- Coordinates: 43°29′N 13°9′E
- Country: Italy
- Region: Marche
- Province: Province of Ancona (AN)
- Frazioni: Stazione, Pianello, Pantiere, Scorcelletti

Area
  - Total: 6.05 km^{2} (2.34 sq mi)
- Elevation: 267 m (876 ft)

Population (30 June 2017)
  - Total: 4,976
  - Density: 822/km^{2} (2,130/sq mi)
- Demonym: Castelbellinesi
- Time zone: UTC+1 (CET)
  - Summer (DST): UTC+2 (CEST)
- Postal code: 60030
- Dialing code: 0731
- Website: Official website

Castelbellino is a comune (municipality) in the Province of Ancona in the Italian region Marche, located about 35 kilometres (22 mi) southwest of Ancona.

Castelbellino borders the following municipalities: Jesi, Maiolati Spontini, Monte Roberto.
