= Cerreto d'Esi =

- Comune
- Comune di Cerreto d'Esi
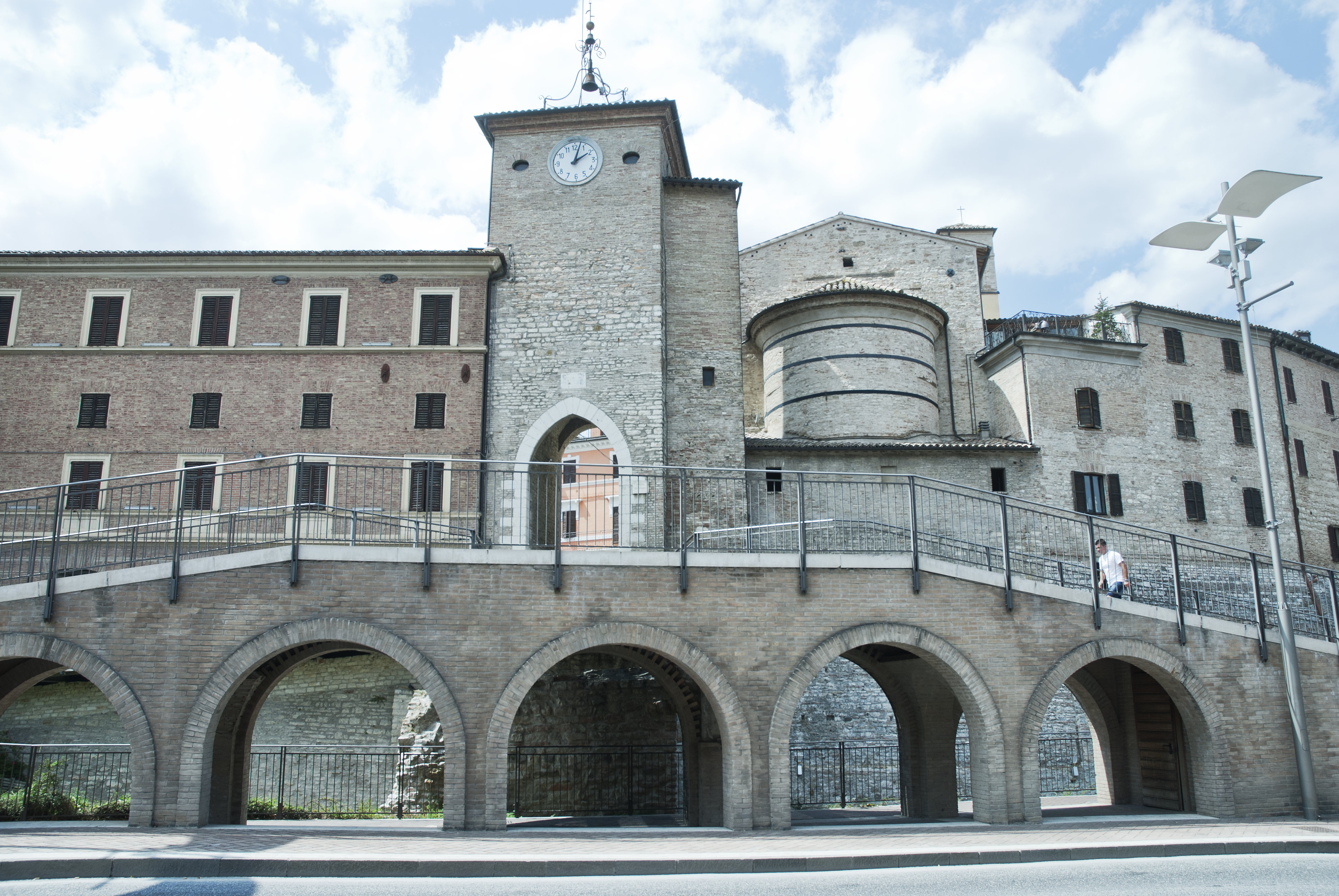
- The "Porta Giustinianea" (Gate of Justinian)

- Location within Italy Location within Marche
- Coordinates: 43°19′N 12°59′E
- Country: Italy
- Region: Marche
- Province: Ancona (AN)

Government
  - Mayor: David Grillini

Area
  - Total: 16.91 km^{2} (6.53 sq mi)
- Elevation: 276 m (906 ft)

Population (30 June 2022)
  - Total: 3,374
  - Density: 199.5/km^{2} (516.8/sq mi)
- Demonym: Cerretesi
- Time zone: UTC+1 (CET)
  - Summer (DST): UTC+2 (CEST)
- Postal code: 60043
- Dialing code: 0732
- Website: Official website

Cerreto d'Esi is a comune (municipality) in the Province of Ancona in the Italian region Marche, located about 50 kilometres (31 mi) southwest of Ancona.

Cerreto d'Esi borders the following municipalities: Fabriano, Matelica, Poggio San Vicino.
