= Province of Ancona =

Province of Italy

Coordinates: 43°37′N 13°31′E

Province of Ancona Provincia di Ancona (Italian)
- Province
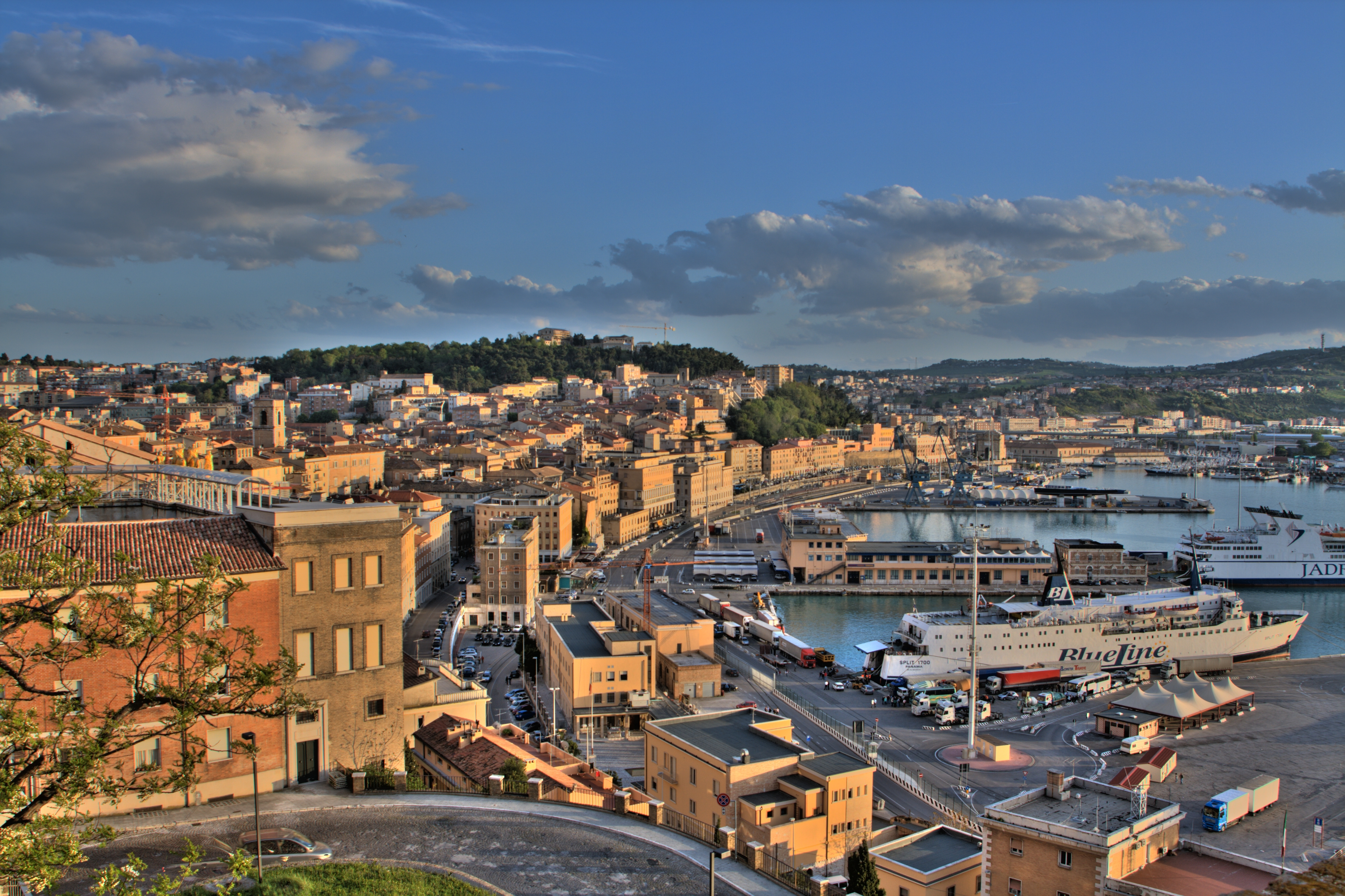
- The port of Ancona

- Flag Coat of arms

- Location of the province of Ancona in Italy
- Country: Italy
- Region: Marche
- Capital(s): Ancona
- Municipalities: 47

Government
  - President: Daniele Carnevali

Area
  - Total: 1,963.22 km^{2} (758.00 sq mi)

Population (2026)
  - Total: 461,613
  - Density: 235.131/km^{2} (608.985/sq mi)

GDP
  - Total: €13.855 billion (2015)
  - Per capita: €29,044 (2015)
- Time zone: UTC+1 (CET)
  - Summer (DST): UTC+2 (CEST)
- Postal code: 60100
- Telephone prefix: 071
- Vehicle registration: AN
- ISTAT code: 042

The province of Ancona (Italian: provincia di Ancona) is a province in the region of Marche in Italy. Its capital is the city of Ancona, and the province borders the Adriatic Sea. The city of Ancona is also the capital of Marche.

It has a population of 461,613 in an area of 1,963.22 square kilometres (758.00 sq mi) across its 47 municipalities.

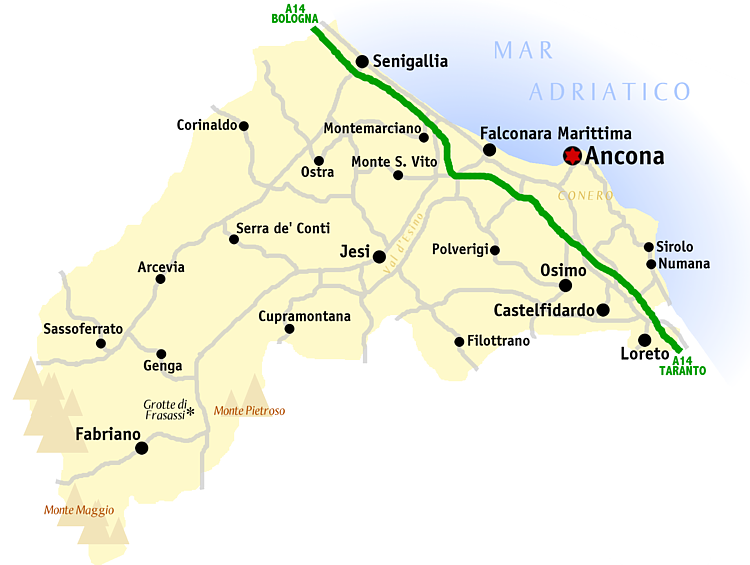
Cities, towns and roads of the province

To the north, the province is bordered by the Adriatic Sea, and the Apennine Mountains to the west. Due to its coastal location, it is strategically important.

Its coastline of sandy beaches is popular with Italians but has not been greatly affected by tourism. A large area of the province's land is farmland often used for wine production; the province produces wines using the Montepulciano, Sangiovese, and Verdicchio varieties of grape. Annually, feasts occur in the province during the harvesting period. It contains mountainous regions and the Conero Regional Park, which contain dense forests where black truffles are found. These are sold in Acqualagna, in the neighbouring province of Pesaro and Urbino.

== Government ==
=== Municipalities ===
The province has 47 municipalities:

- Agugliano
- Ancona
- Arcevia
- Barbara
- Belvedere Ostrense
- Camerano
- Camerata Picena
- Castelbellino
- Castelfidardo
- Castelleone di Suasa
- Castelplanio
- Cerreto d'Esi
- Chiaravalle
- Corinaldo
- Cupramontana
- Fabriano
- Falconara Marittima
- Filottrano
- Genga
- Jesi
- Loreto
- Maiolati Spontini
- Mergo
- Monsano
- Monte Roberto
- Monte San Vito
- Montecarotto
- Montemarciano
- Morro d'Alba
- Numana
- Offagna
- Osimo
- Ostra
- Ostra Vetere
- Poggio San Marcello
- Polverigi
- Rosora
- San Marcello
- San Paolo di Jesi
- Santa Maria Nuova
- Sassoferrato
- Senigallia
- Serra de' Conti
- Serra San Quirico
- Sirolo
- Staffolo
- Trecastelli

== Demographics ==
As of 2026, the population is 461,613, of which 49.2% are male, and 50.8% are female. Minors make up 14.0% of the population, and seniors make up 26.8%.

Historical population

Year	Pop.	±%
1861	265,979	—
1871	274,162	+3.1%
1881	277,861	+1.3%
1901	308,346	+11.0%
1911	328,728	+6.6%
1921	345,765	+5.2%
1931	359,720	+4.0%
1936	372,229	+3.5%

Year	Pop.	±%
1951	399,143	+7.2%
1961	405,709	+1.6%
1971	416,611	+2.7%
1981	433,417	+4.0%
1991	437,263	+0.9%
2001	448,473	+2.6%
2011	473,865	+5.7%
2021	461,687	−2.6%

Source: ISTAT

=== Immigration ===
As of 2025, immigrants make up 13.5% of the population. The 5 largest foreign countries of birth are Romania, Albania, Bangladesh, Tunisia, and Morocco.

== Notable people ==
Famous people born of the province of Ancona include Frederick II, Holy Roman Emperor (Jesi); International Gothic painter Gentile da Fabriano (Fabriano); writer Rafael Sabatini (Jesi); composer Gaspare Spontini (Maiolati, which has since been named after him as Maiolati Spontini); composer Giovanni Battista Pergolesi (Jesi); mathematician and physicist Vito Volterra (Ancona); footballer Roberto Mancini (Jesi); Pope Leo XII (Genga); Pope Pius IX (Senigallia); and actress Virna Lisi (Jesi).
