= Castelleone di Suasa =

Castellone di Suasa
- Comune
- Comune di Castelleone di Suasa
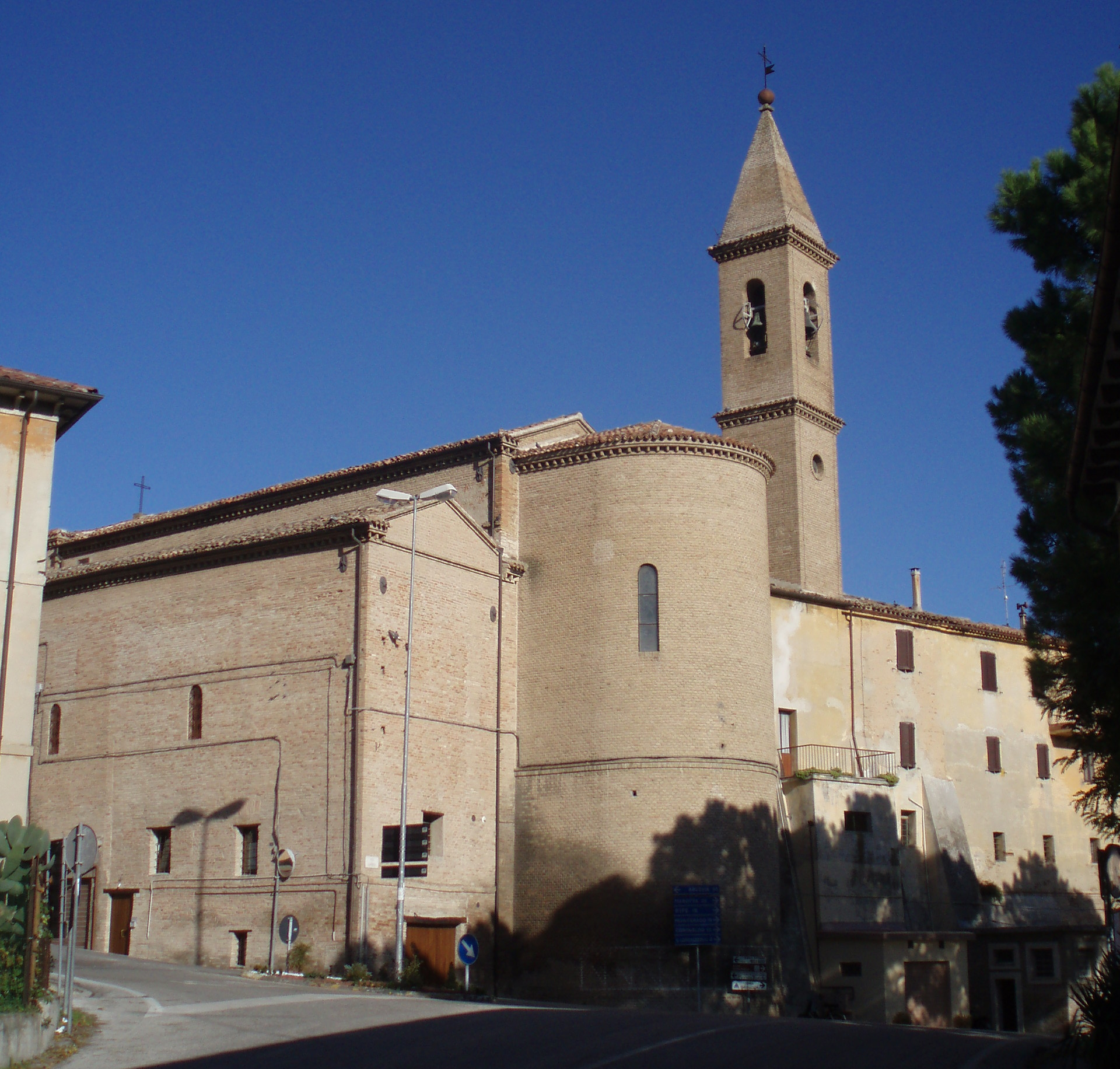
- Parish church of Sts. Peter and Paul.

- Coat of arms

- Location within Italy Location within Marche
- Coordinates: 43°36′N 12°59′E
- Country: Italy
- Region: Marche
- Province: Ancona (AN)
- Frazioni: Bozzo, Casalta, Case Nuove, Farneto, Pian Volpello, Santa Lucia, Ville

Government
  - Mayor: Carlo Manfredi

Area
  - Total: 15 km^{2} (5.8 sq mi)
- Elevation: 206 m (676 ft)

Population (31 December 2010)
  - Total: 1,723
  - Density: 110/km^{2} (300/sq mi)
- Demonym: Castelleonesi
- Time zone: UTC+1 (CET)
  - Summer (DST): UTC+2 (CEST)
- Postal code: 60010
- Dialing code: 071
- Patron saint: St. Peter the Martyr
- Saint day: 29 April
- Website: Official website

Castelleone di Suasa is a town and comune within the Province of Ancona, in the Marche region of Italy.

It is well known for the archaeological park of Suasa, an ancient Roman town.

Rising on a hill near the river Cesano, Castelleone di Suasa is also called "green town" because of its flourishing nursery activity. Below the medieval castle there are the remains of the Roman municipality of Suasa, that rose along the branch of the via Flaminia that led to Sena Gallica (Senigallia).

Since 1987 the Archaeological Superintendence of the Regione of Marche, has started a programme of excavations that has allowed the discovery of the ancient basalt street, the commercial forum, two sepulchre areas, the amphitheatre and, above all, the rich patrician dwelling that has become Archaeological Park.

== Main sights ==
- The Compiano-Della Rovere palace, seat of the archaeological museum, is situated in the historical centre. It possesses a beautiful sixteenth century portal and a lovely courtyard.
- Church of SS. Pietro e Paolo, from the second half of 16th century. It houses a work attributed to Viviani (16th century) and one signed by Ascanio Casola (1674).

Outside the town there is the rural Chapel of San Martino, where an early canvas by the painter Ercole Ramazzani (16th century) is displayed.

From the medieval village it is possible to descend to the valley below (Pian Volpello zone), where the archaeological area of Suasa is located.

== Traditions and events ==
The "Forgiveness Feast", the most important religious event of the year, takes place during the spring season, followed by the Fair on the successive Monday.

The onion was one of the most important foods in the local economy and the people of Castelleone were known as onion growers. Consequently, a major attraction has become the Festa della Cipolla (Onion Festival), on the first weekend in September. The festival includes travelling shows and food stands with onion-based recipes.
