= Offagna =

- Comune
- Comune di Offagna
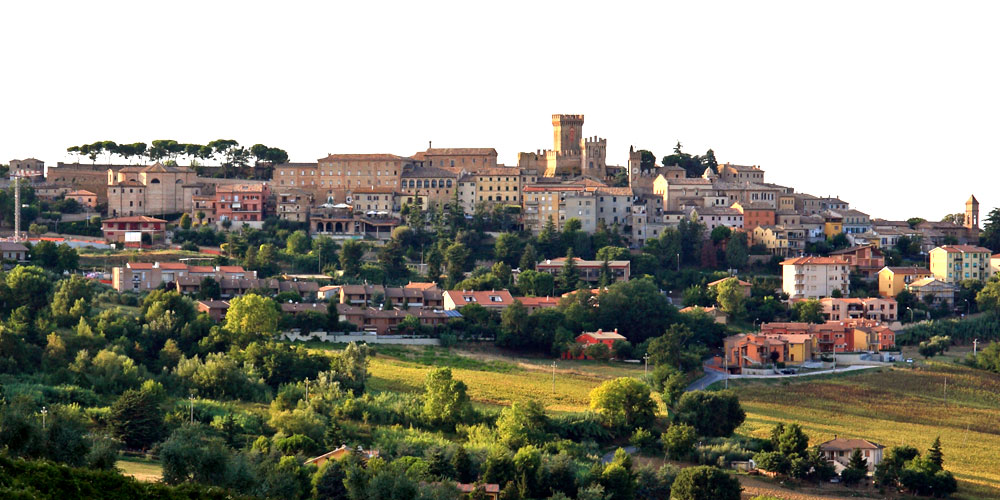
- Panorama of Offagna

- Location within Italy Location within Marche
- Coordinates: 43°32′N 13°27′E
- Country: Italy
- Region: Marche
- Province: Province of Ancona (AN)

Area
  - Total: 10.5 km^{2} (4.1 sq mi)

Population (Dec. 2004)
  - Total: 1,801
  - Density: 172/km^{2} (444/sq mi)
- Time zone: UTC+1 (CET)
  - Summer (DST): UTC+2 (CEST)
- Postal code: 60020
- Dialing code: 071

Offagna is a comune (municipality) in the Province of Ancona in the Italian region of Marche, about 11 kilometres (7 mi) southwest of Ancona. As of 31 December 2018, it had a population of 1,992 and an area of 10.5 square kilometres (4.1 mi^{2}).

Offagna borders the following municipalities: Ancona, Osimo, Polverigi. It is one of I Borghi più belli d'Italia ("The most beautiful villages of Italy").

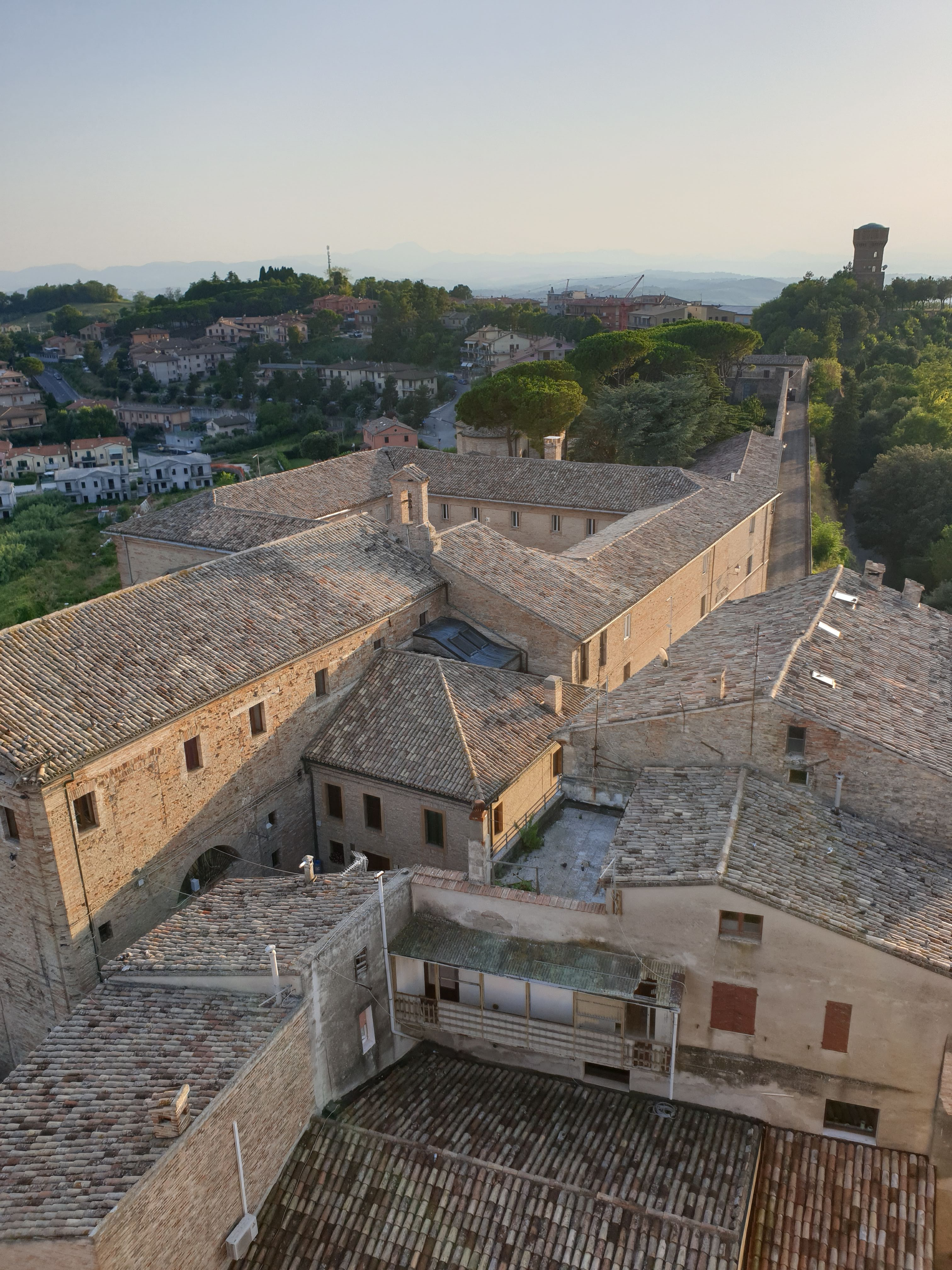
View of Offagna from the main tower of the Rocca

== Demographic evolution ==
Historical population

Year	Pop.	±%
1861	2,172	—
1871	2,309	+6.3%
1881	2,227	−3.6%
1901	1,884	−15.4%
1911	1,857	−1.4%

Year	Pop.	±%
1921	1,932	+4.0%
1931	1,927	−0.3%
1936	1,920	−0.4%
1951	1,966	+2.4%
1961	1,699	−13.6%

Year	Pop.	±%
1971	1,381	−18.7%
1981	1,432	+3.7%
1991	1,534	+7.1%
2001	1,692	+10.3%

Source: Data from ISTAT
