= Poggio San Marcello =

- Comune
- Comune di Poggio San Marcello
- Location within Italy Location within Marche
- Coordinates: 43°31′N 13°5′E
- Country: Italy
- Region: Marche
- Province: Ancona (AN)

Government
  - Mayor: Tiziano Consoli

Area
  - Total: 13.5 km^{2} (5.2 sq mi)

Population (30 April 2013)
  - Total: 704
  - Density: 52.1/km^{2} (135/sq mi)
- Time zone: UTC+1 (CET)
  - Summer (DST): UTC+2 (CEST)
- Postal code: 60030
- Dialing code: 0731

Poggio San Marcello is a comune (municipality) in the Province of Ancona in the Italian region Marche, located about 35 kilometres (22 mi) southwest of Ancona.

Poggio San Marcello borders the following municipalities: Belvedere Ostrense, Castelplanio, Montecarotto, Rosora.

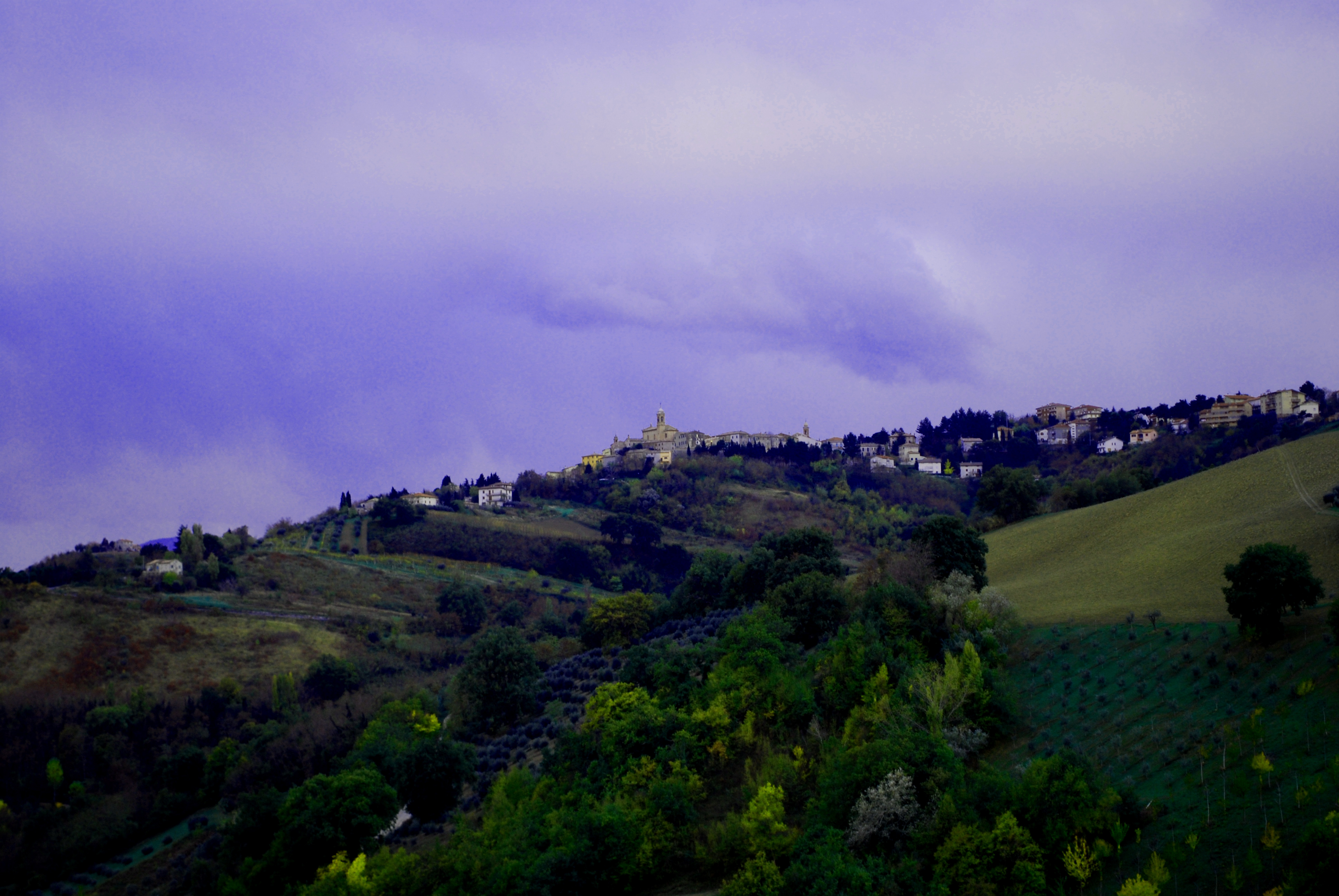
Poggio san Marcello
