= Castelplanio =

- Comune
- Comune di Castelplanio
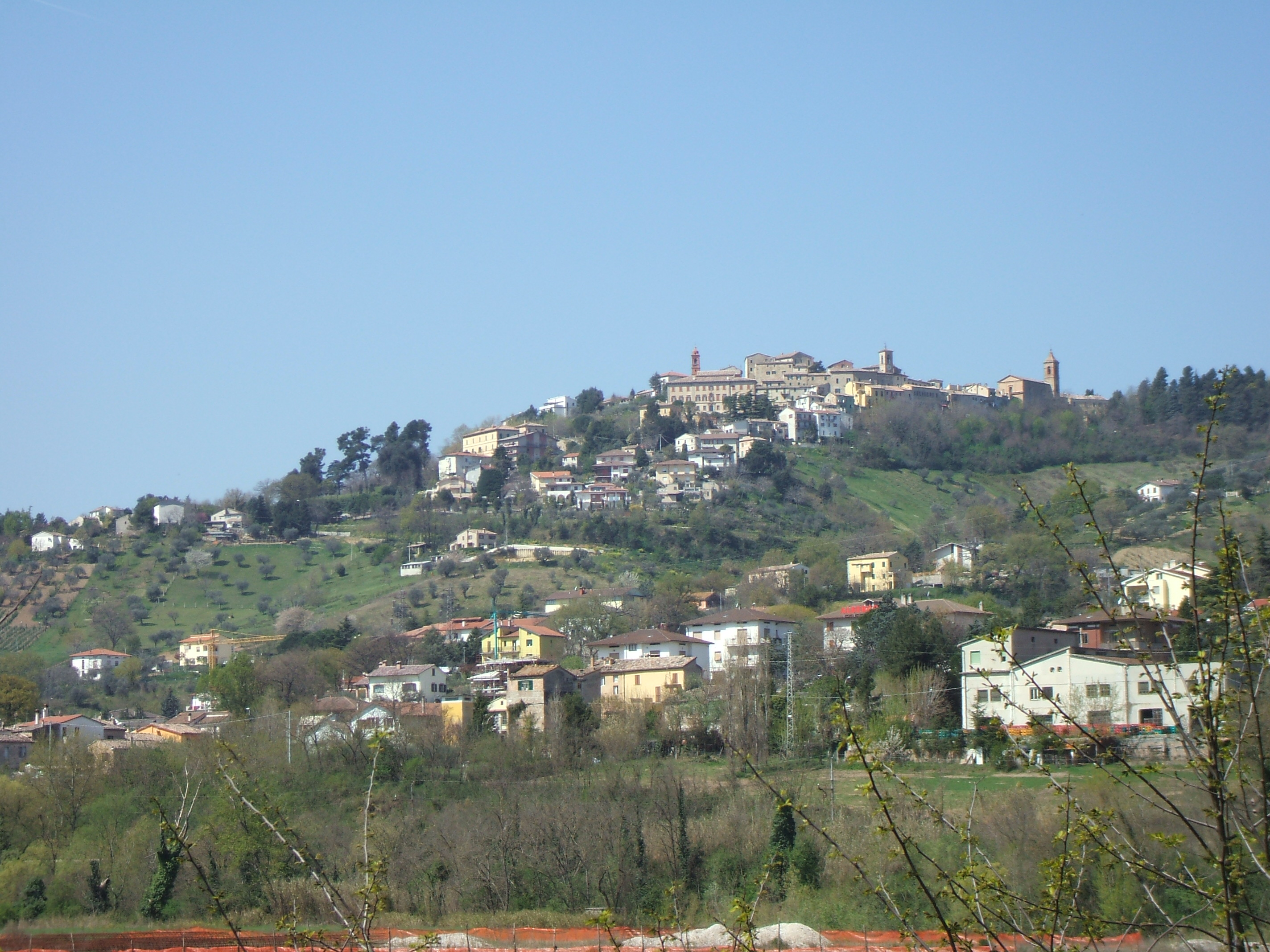
- Castelplanio (upon the hill) with its major frazione, Macine, in the foreground

- Location within Italy Location within Marche
- Coordinates: 43°30′N 13°5′E
- Country: Italy
- Region: Marche
- Province: Ancona (AN)

Government
  - Mayor: Barbara Romualdi

Area
  - Total: 15.1 km^{2} (5.8 sq mi)
- Elevation: 305 m (1,001 ft)

Population (30 June 2017)
  - Total: 3,549
  - Density: 235/km^{2} (609/sq mi)
- Demonym: Castelpianesi
- Time zone: UTC+1 (CET)
  - Summer (DST): UTC+2 (CEST)
- Postal code: 60031
- Dialing code: 0731
- Patron saint: St. Joseph
- Saint day: 24 April
- Website: Official website

Castelplanio is a comune (municipality) in the Province of Ancona in the Italian region Marche, located about 35 kilometres (22 mi) southwest of Ancona.

Castelplanio borders the following municipalities: Belvedere Ostrense, Maiolati Spontini, Poggio San Marcello, Rosora.
