= Falconara Marittima =

- Comune
- Comune di Falconara Marittima
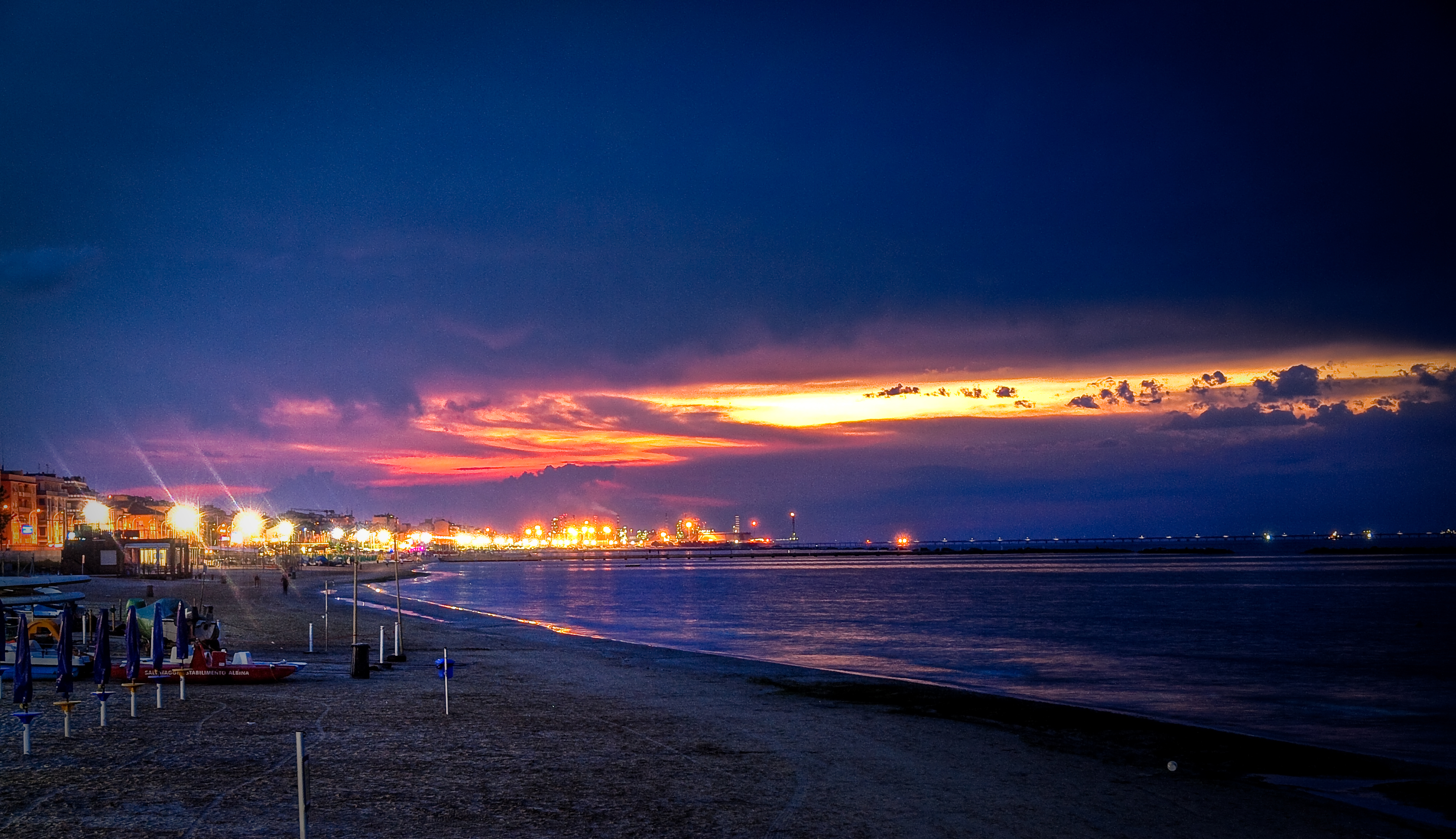
- The coast of Falconara Marittima at sunset

- Coat of arms

- Location within Italy Location within Marche
- Coordinates: 43°38′N 13°24′E
- Country: Italy
- Region: Marche
- Province: Ancona (AN)
- Frazioni: Castelferretti, Falconara Alta, Fiumesino, Palombina Vecchia, Rocca a Mare, Villanova

Government
  - Mayor: Stefania Signorini (Center-right coalition)

Area
  - Total: 25 km^{2} (9.7 sq mi)
- Elevation: 5 m (16 ft)

Population (30 November 2025)
  - Total: 26,037
  - Density: 1,000/km^{2} (2,700/sq mi)
- Demonym: Falconaresi
- Time zone: UTC+1 (CET)
  - Summer (DST): UTC+2 (CEST)
- Postal code: 60015
- Dialing code: 071
- Patron saint: Madonna del SS. Rosario
- Saint day: May 8
- Website: Official website

Falconara Marittima is a seaside resort on the Adriatic coast, in Italy, located 9 kilometres (5.6 mi) north of Ancona, in the Marche region, province of Ancona.

== History ==
The settlement of Falconara Alta is mentioned in the first historical documents dating back to 1051 and multiplied in the following centuries. The building, perhaps already existing in Roman times, was surrounded by buildings in the Middle Ages, was bought by the noble family of Bourbon del Monte in the 16th century and became a noble residence during the eighteenth and nineteenth centuries. The 1972 earthquake created the conditions for expropriation by the Municipality, which decided to transform it into a museum, a venue for performances, a conference hall and then the town hall.

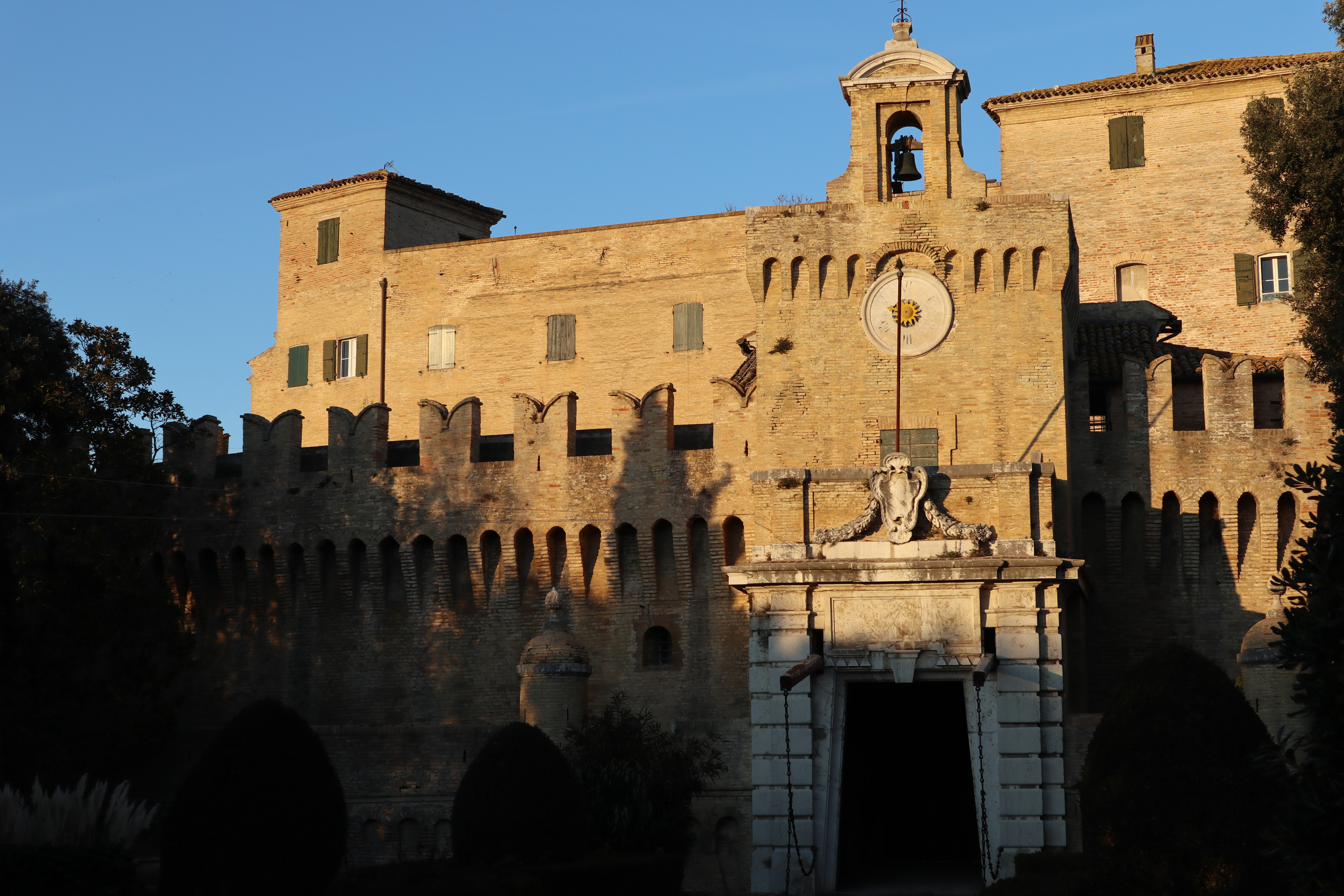
The Rocca Priora Castle

The castle currently known as Rocca Priora was founded in 1194; it subsequently underwent various events and architectural transformations, until it achieved its current appearance as a private property, used as a family-run agricultural business.

The Castle of Falconara Alta, together with those of Rocca Priora and of Castelferretti, represented a defence system around Ancona, which controlled the territory and demanded bridge toll for crossing over the river Esino and had many other functions.

== Monuments and places of interest ==
- Church of Santa Maria della Misericordia with 15th-century frescoes.
- Historical archive
- Piero Pergoli Cultural Center
- Resistance Museum
- International Franciscan Art Gallery: Since 2005, the Franciscan Library of Falconara has housed a collection of artistic works dedicated to the figure of Saint Francis.

Falconara Marittima's main attraction is a long sandy beach where during the summer people practice sports such as beach volleyball, beach tennis and beach soccer. It's there too a 6-hectare (15-acre) zoo.

=== Events ===
Every year on 15 August, the Ferragosto holiday a fireworks display takes place.

The Frecce Tricolori show took place in the sky of Falconara Marittima in the summer of 2007 and 2009

The Cormorano park on the north side of town has hosted numerous cultural events, including concerts of Francesco De Gregori, Goran Bregovic and Piero Pelù.

== Climate ==
Winters can be quite cold due to the bora, an icy wind that blows along the coast, however snow is rare. The last recorded heavy snowfall occurred in February 2012, then again in February 2018

From April to June the climate is warm and pleasant, with moderate humidity. July and August can be very hot, with high temperatures usually above 30 °C (86 °F).

In 2003 Falconara experienced twin tornados along the coast.

Climate data for Falconara Marittima
Month	Jan	Feb	Mar	Apr	May	Jun	Jul	Aug	Sep	Oct	Nov	Dec	Year
Mean daily maximum °C (°F)	8 (46)	10 (50)	12 (54)	16 (61)	20 (68)	25 (77)	27 (81)	27 (81)	24 (75)	18 (64)	13 (55)	10 (50)	17 (63)
Daily mean °C (°F)	5 (41)	7 (45)	9 (48)	13 (55)	17 (63)	21 (70)	24 (75)	24 (75)	21 (70)	15 (59)	10 (50)	7 (45)	14 (57)
Mean daily minimum °C (°F)	3 (37)	4 (39)	6 (43)	11 (52)	14 (57)	18 (64)	21 (70)	21 (70)	18 (64)	13 (55)	8 (46)	5 (41)	12 (54)
Average precipitation cm (inches)	6 (2.4)	4 (1.6)	5 (2.0)	5 (2.0)	4 (1.6)	4 (1.6)	3 (1.2)	4 (1.6)	7 (2.8)	9 (3.5)	7 (2.8)	6 (2.4)	69 (27)
Source: Weatherbase

== Society ==
=== Demographic evolution ===
Historical population

Year	Pop.	±%
1861	4,272	—
1871	4,603	+7.7%
1881	4,796	+4.2%
1901	5,511	+14.9%
1911	6,438	+16.8%
1921	8,280	+28.6%

Year	Pop.	±%
1931	9,537	+15.2%
1936	10,056	+5.4%
1951	13,157	+30.8%
1961	16,545	+25.8%
1971	24,140	+45.9%
1981	29,122	+20.6%

Year	Pop.	±%
1991	30,105	+3.4%
2001	28,349	−5.8%
2011	26,710	−5.8%
2021	25,576	−4.2%

Source: Data from ISTAT

=== Ethnic groups and foreign minorities ===
As of 2025, 87.1% of the population was Italian.There were 3,340 foreigners residing in Falconara Marittima as of January 1, 2025, representing 12.9% of the total population. The largest foreign community is that from Romania, with 26.8% of all foreigners present in the area, followed by Bangladesh and Albania.

== Infrastructure and transportation ==
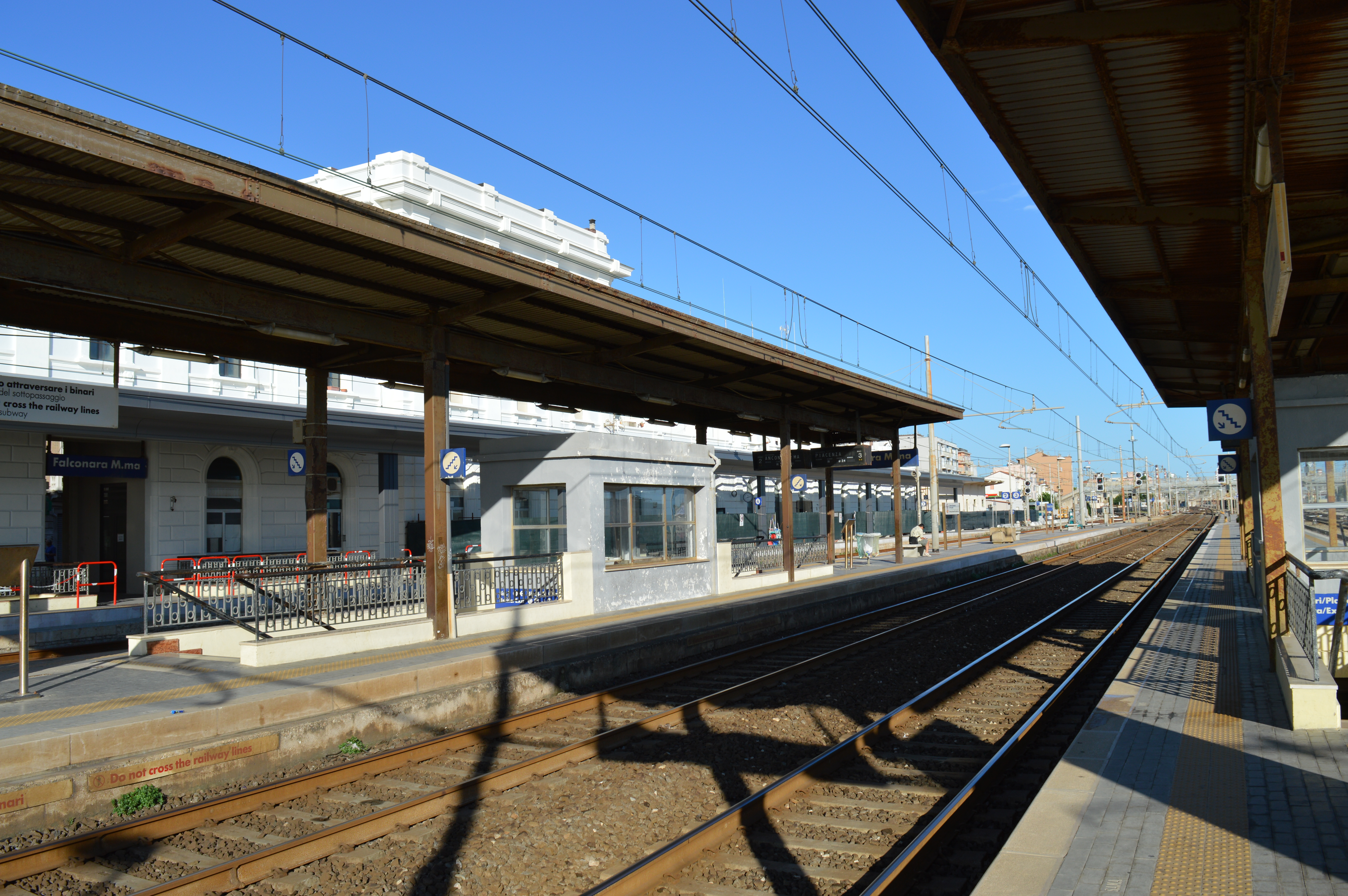
Railway station platform square

=== Railways ===
Falconara Marittima is an important rail hub connecting the Adriatic line Bologna-Ancona and the Apennine line Rome-Ancona.

=== Airport ===
Falconara Airport was used by the United States Army Air Forces between 1 April and 1 September 1945 as a military airfield.

Ancona Airport is located in Falconara Marittima. The railway station is located opposite the airport and can be reached on foot in just 3 minutes. The ine connects the Castelferretti – Falconara Aeroporto station to the Adriatic coast (Falconara and Ancona) and the Tyrrhenian coast (Jesi, Fabriano, Rome).The Falconara-Orte main line is one of the few transversal lines on the Italian Railway Network; the Adriatic line also passes through Falconara railway station.

The Raffaello Aerobus is a shuttle bus service to/from Ancona (Piazza Cavour, Central Station, and Torrette) and Falconara Marina Station.

== Sport ==
The local volleyball team Pallavolo Falconara won the CEV Cup in 1986 and reached play-off semifinal of Italian Volleyball League two times in the eighties. Notable former volleyball players of the club include Ferdinando De Giorgi, Daniel Castellani, Tom Sorensen, Raimonds Vilde, Jan Kvalheim, Andrea Anastasi, Leondino Giombini, Pasquale Gravina, Valerio Vermiglio and Samuele Papi.
