= Serra San Quirico =

- Comune
- Comune di Serra San Quirico
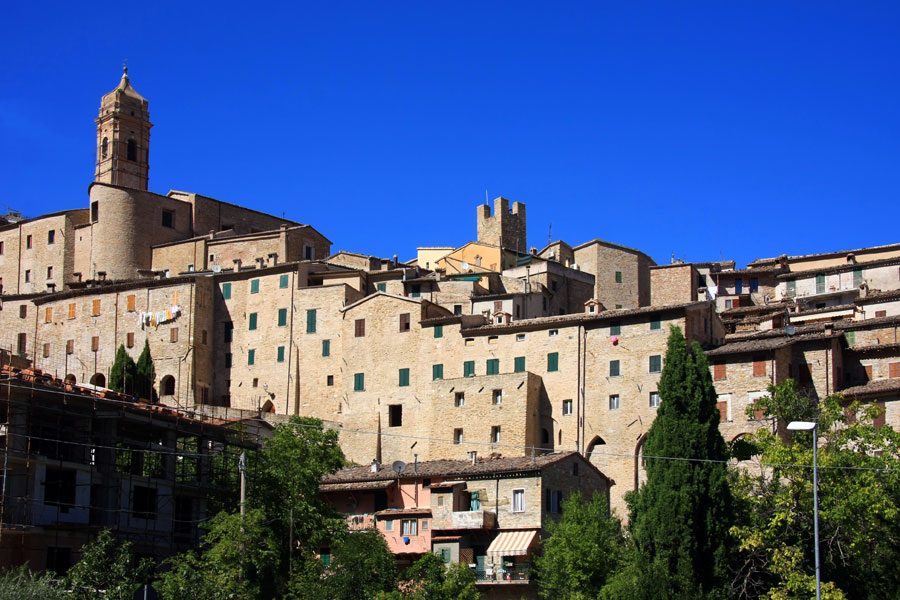

- Coat of arms

- Location within Italy Location within Marche
- Coordinates: 43°27′N 13°1′E
- Country: Italy
- Region: Marche
- Province: Ancona (AN)
- Frazioni: Castellaro, Domo, Sasso

Government
  - Mayor: Debora Pellacchia

Area
  - Total: 49.1 km^{2} (19.0 sq mi)

Population (28 February 2009)
  - Total: 3,078
  - Density: 62.7/km^{2} (162/sq mi)
- Time zone: UTC+1 (CET)
  - Summer (DST): UTC+2 (CEST)
- Postal code: 60048
- Dialing code: 0731
- Website: Official website

Serra San Quirico is a comune (municipality) in the Province of Ancona in the Italian region Marche, located about 45 kilometres (28 mi) southwest of Ancona.
