= Regio VI Umbria =

Subdivision of Roman Italy

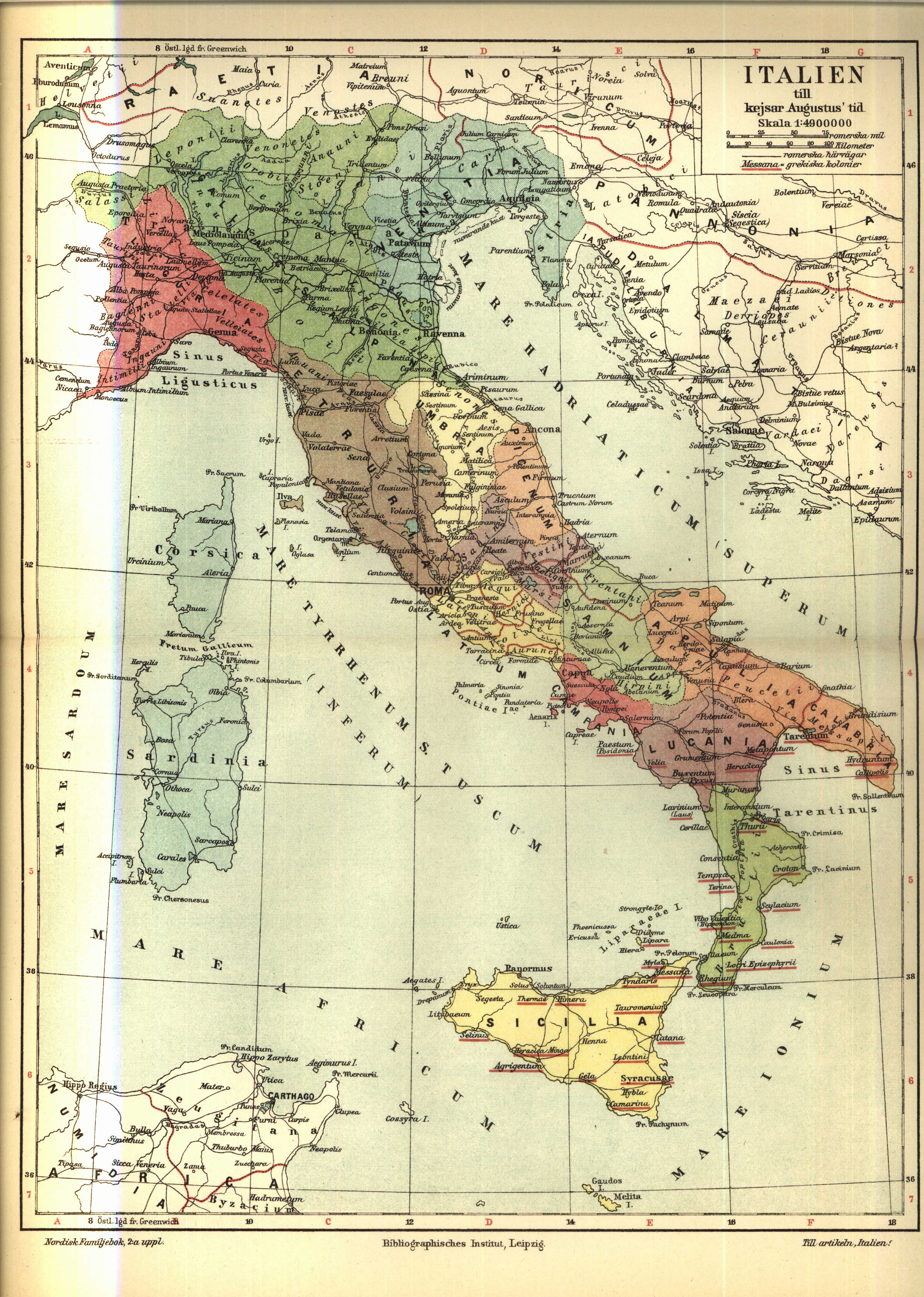
Map of Italy in the time of Augustus, showing the Gallic coast and the places mentioned by Pliny. Taken from the Nordisk familjebok, first edition 1876.

Regio VI Umbria (also named Regio VI Umbria et Ager Gallicus) is the name for one of the 11 administrative regions into which the emperor Augustus divided Italy. The main source for the regions is the Historia Naturalis of Pliny the Elder, who informs his readers he is basing the geography of Italy on the descriptio Italiae, "division of Italy", made by Augustus. The Regio Sexta ("6th Region") is called Umbria complexa agrumque Gallicam citra Ariminium ("Umbria including the Gallic country this side of Rimini").

Umbria is named after an Italic people, the Umbri, who were gradually subjugated by the Romans in the 4th through the 2nd centuries BC. Although it passed the name on to the modern region of Umbria, the two coincide only partially. Roman Umbria extended from Narni in the South, northeastward to the neighborhood of Ravenna on the Adriatic coast, thus including a large part of central Italy that now belongs to the Marche; at the same time, it excluded the Sabine country (generally speaking, the area around modern Norcia) and the right bank of the Tiber, which – being inhabited by Etruscans – formed part of Regio VII Etruria: for example Perusia (the modern Perugia) and Orvieto (its ancient name is unknown), two Etruscan cities – were not part of Roman Umbria; on the contrary Sarsina, Plautus birthplace, was considered to be "in Umbria", while today it is in the modern province of Forlì-Cesena, in Emilia-Romagna.

The importance of Umbria in Roman and medieval times was intimately bound up with the Via Flaminia, the consular road that supplied Rome and served as a military highway into and out of the City: for this reason once the Roman empire collapsed, Umbria became a strategic battleground fought over by the Church, the Lombards and the Byzantines, and suffered consequently, becoming partitioned among them and disappearing from history. The modern use of "Umbria" is due to a renaissance of local identity in the 17th century.

== Italic Umbria ==
Before its defeat by and assimilation to the Romans, Umbria was an independent region organized as a loose confederation of towns whose inhabitants spoke the Umbrian language. This circumstance prevailed in history during the early and middle Roman Republic. By the late republic, Umbria was part of Rome. The language was no longer generally spoken.

== Umbria in the geographers of the empire ==
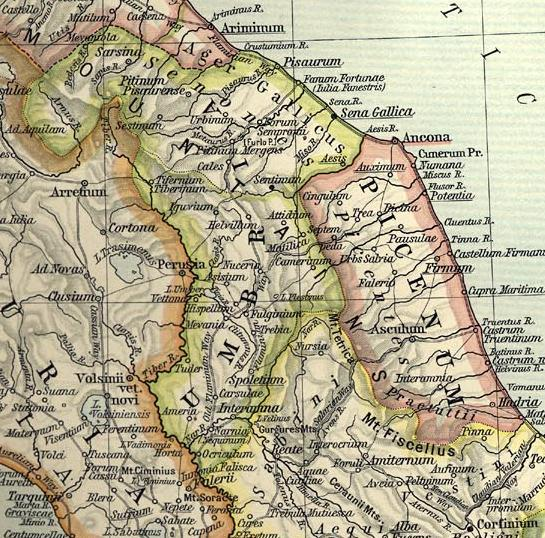
Ancient Umbria and the Gallic coast. Extracted and adapted from The Historical Atlas by William R. Shepherd, 1911.

Like any other region, over the centuries Region VI changed its borders. These changes are reflected in the writings of the imperial geographers.

=== Pliny ===
The sexta regio is described in some detail by Pliny the Elder.

==== Gallia togata ====
Gallia Togata went along the northern Adriatic coast of Italy in Marche from Ancona to "this side of Rimini." The southernmost point of Gallia Togata is Ancona. He mentions the Aesis River (Esino) north of there, Senagallia (Senigallia), Pisaurum (Pesaro) and then Fanum (Fano) at the mouth of the Metaurus (Metauro) River.

There follows a folk-etymologic statement concerning the name of the Umbri. People believe, he says, that they are named from the thunderstorms (imbres) of the deluge and therefore that they are the oldest people on Earth. (The ancient Greeks and Romans inherited a mythological tradition of a deluge independent of that of the Old Testament.) Some of his further statements appear to be equivocal, leading to some historical misidentification of Gallia Togata. He declares:

"The largest part of this district was occupied by Sicilians and Liburnians especially the territories of Palma, Praetutia and Adria."

This Adria (Hadrianus) is Atri, Italy on the coast of Abruzzi south of Ancona. Praetutia is Interamnia Praetutia, capital city of the Petrutii. From Interamnea comes Teramo and from Praetutia comes Aprutium, later Abruzzo. The coast of Abruzzo was in Augustus' Region IV; however, Pliny does not say that the Abruzzo was the largest part of Gallia Togata, only that it was the largest part of the region settled by Sicilians and Liburnians. Similarly if Hadrianus is taken to be Adria in Veneto then Gallia Togata would appear to be a synonym for all Gallia Cisalpina. However, Veneto is not "this side of Rimini."

Pliny states his belief that the Umbrians once held the north Adriatic coast, displacing Sicilians and Liburnians, and were in turn displaced by the Etruscans. The Gauls expelled them. Romans colonized the Gallic coast to control it, hence "togata."

==== Umbria proper ====
For Umbria proper Pliny simply lists the settlements: Spello, Todi, Amelia, Attiglio, Assisi, Arna, Iesi, Camerino, Casuentillum, Carsulae, Dolates Sallentini, Foligno, Market of Flaminius, Market of Julius, Market Brenta, Fossombrone, Gubbio, Terni, etc.

=== Ptolemy ===
Ptolemy, 2nd century geographer, does not lump Gallia Togata together with Umbria, but describes them as separate regions.

==== Gallia Togata ====
In Ptolemy, Ancona is in Picenum. The strip of country "above" the Apennines, "extending as far as Ravenna," is Gallia Togata. Thirteen towns are listed for it, which are south of the Po River, but are as far inland as Piacenza. This region is somewhat larger than the one of the same name in Augustus' time, comprising almost all of Emilia-Romagna. The towns are: Piacenza, Fidenza, Brescello, Parma, etc.

==== Umbria proper ====
For the Umbri Ptolemy has only nine towns, omitting some of the major ones: Arna, Spello, Todi, etc.

== The cities of Regio VI ==
Regio VI included the territory of many towns of Umbrian, Gallic and Roman foundation. Some of them were originally Picentian centres. Pliny the Elder enumerates 44 cities in addition to other minor localities, of these cities today 25 belong to the Umbria region and 16 to the Marche region, 2 to Romagna and 1 to Tuscany.

Cities of Regio VI
| Latin name | Umbrian name | Modern name | Zone | Modern Region | Foundation | Gens/Tribus | Note |
|---|---|---|---|---|---|---|---|
| Aesis | | Jesi | ager Gallicus | Marche | Picentian, later Roman colonia deduced in 247 a.C. | Pollia | |
| Ameria | Amer | Amelia | | Umbria | Umbrian | | |
| Arna | | Civitella d'Arna | | Umbria | Umbrian | | |
| Asisium | | Assisi | | Umbria | Umbrian | Sergia | |
| Attidium | Atiersium | Attiggio, near Fabriano | | Marche | Umbrian | Lemonia | |
| Camerinum | Kamars | Camerino | | Marche | Umbrian | Cornelia | |
| Carsulae | | near San Gemini | | Umbria | | | |
| Corculon | Falisci | Montefalco | | Umbria | Umbrian | | |
| Fanum Fortunae | – | Fano | ager Gallicus | Marche | Picentian, then Roman colonia | Pollia | Colonia Julia Fanestris |
| Forum Flaminii | | San Giovanni Profiamma (Foligno) | | Umbria | Roman: founded in 220 a.C. by censor Gaius Flaminius during the construction of via Flaminia | | |
| Forum Julii Concupiensium | | near Pietralunga | | Umbria | | | Promoted to municipium nell'età augustea |
| Forum Sempronii | – | near Fossombrone | ager Gallicus | Marche | Picentian | Pollia | |
| Fulginium, Fulginia | Fulkinion | Foligno | | Umbria | Umbrian foundation, according to some authors in 1480 a.C. | Cornelia | |
| Hispellum | | Spello | | Umbria | Umbrian | Lemonia, then Julia | Splendidissima colonia Julia |
| Iguvium | Ikuvium | Gubbio | | Umbria | Umbrian | Crustumina | |
| Interamna Nahars | | Terni | | Umbria | Umbrian foundation in 672 a.C. | | |
| Matilica | | Matelica | | Marche | Picentian | Cornelia | |
| Mevania | | Bevagna | | Umbria | Umbrian | Aemilia | |
| Mevaniola | | near Galeata | | Romagna | Umbrian | Stellatina | |
| Narnia Nahars | Nequinum | Narni | | Umbria | Umbrian. Founded by Umbrians as Nequinum, destroyed by the Romans, was founded again by them nearby as Narnia Nahars | Papiria | |
| Nuceria Camellaria | Noukria | Nocera Umbra | | Umbria | Umbrian | | |
| Nuceria Favoniensis | | Pievefanonica near Capodacqua | | Umbria | Umbrian | | |
| Ocriculum | | near Otricoli | | Umbria | Umbrian | | |
| Ostra | – | near Ostra Vetere | ager Gallicus | Marche | Roman foundation | Pollia | |
| Pisaurum | – | Pesaro | ager Gallicus | Marche | Picentian, then, from 184 a.C., Roman colonia | Stellatina | In triumviral and augustean age the city got the name of colonia Iulia Felix Pisaurum |
| Pitinum Mergens | – | near Acqualagna | | Marche | | Crustumina | |
| Pitinum Pisaurense | – | near Macerata Feltria | ager Gallicus | Marche | | Ufentina | |
| Plestia | | near Colfiorito | | Umbria/Marche | Umbrian | Oufentina | |
| Sarsina | | Sarsina | | Romagna | Umbrian | Pupinia | |
| Sena Gallica | – | Senigallia | ager Gallicus | Marche | Roman colonia since 283 a.C. | Pollia | |
| Sentinum | | near Sassoferrato | | Marche | | Lemonia | |
| Sestinum | | Sestino | | Toscana | | Crustumina | |
| Spoletium | | Spoleto | | Umbria | Umbrian, Roman colonia was founded in 241 a.C. | Horatia | |
| Suasa | – | near Castelleone di Suasa | ager Gallicus | Marche | Roman foundation | Camilia | Sometimes named Suasa Senonum |
| Suillum | | near Sigillo | | Umbria | | | Roman municipium ruled by duoviri |
| Tadinum | Tarsina | Gualdo Tadino | | Umbria | Umbrian | | |
| Tifernum Metaurense | | near Sant'Angelo in Vado | | Marche | | Crustumina | |
| Tifernum Tiberinum | | Città di Castello | | Umbria | | Crustumina | |
| Trebia o Lucana Trebiensis | | near Trevi | | Umbria | | Aemilia | |
| Tuder | Tutere | Todi | | Umbria | Umbrian | Crustumina | |
| Tuficum | | Borgo Tufico, near Fabriano | | Marche | | Oufentina | |
| Urvinum Hortense | | near Collemancio | | Umbria | Roman | | |
| Urvinum Metaurense | | Urbino | | Marche | | Stellatina | Sometimes named Urvinum Mataurense |
| Vettona | | Bettona | | Umbria | Umbrian | | |

== See also ==
- Umbria
- Umbri
- Umbrian language

== Bibliography ==
- Pliny the Elder. Natural History.
- Ptolemy (c. 100s). Geography.
