= Precia gens =

Family in ancient Rome

The gens Precia was a minor plebeian family of equestrian rank at ancient Rome. Members of this gens are first mentioned toward the end of the Republic.

== Praenomina ==
The Precii known from history and inscriptions used the praenomina Lucius, Gaius, and Quintus, among the most common names at all periods.

== Members ==
This list includes abbreviated praenomina. For an explanation of this practice, see filiation.

- Precia, the mistress of Publius Cornelius Cethegus. Lucullus used her influence to obtain a command in the Third Mithridatic War.
- Lucius Precius, an eques and merchant at Panormus during the governorship of Verres in Sicily. He may be the same Precius who left some property to Cicero.
- Precius, named Cicero as one of his heirs.
- Precianus, one of the Precii who was adopted into another gens, was a jurist, and friend of Cicero and his protégé, Trebatius Testa. He was known and respected by Caesar.
- Quintus Precius, the father of Quintus Precius Proculus, named in an inscription from Septempeda in Picenum.
- Precius Cadus, named in an inscription from Aquileia in Venetia and Histria.
- Gaius Precius Felix Neapolitanus, named in an inscription from Pola in Venetia and Histria, dating from the proconsular command of Sextus Palpellius Hister, the consul of AD 43.
- Quintus Precius Q. f. Q. n. Hermes, the son of Quintus Precius Proculus and Graecina Paetina, named in an inscription from Ostra in Umbria.
- Quintus Precius Q. f. Proculus, a municipal official at Ostra in Umbria, was the husband of Graecina Paetina, for whom he built a tomb in Ostra, and the father of Quintus Precius Hermes.
- Precia Veneria, the wife of Valerius Zoticus and mother of Valeria Vitalis, whom Precia and Zoticus buried at Rome, aged seventeen years, nine months, and eighteen days.

== See also ==
- List of Roman gentes

== Bibliography ==
- Marcus Tullius Cicero, Epistulae ad Atticum, Epistulae ad Familiares, In Verrem.
- Plutarchus, Lives of the Noble Greeks and Romans.
- Dictionary of Greek and Roman Biography and Mythology, William Smith, ed., Little, Brown and Company, Boston (1849).
- Theodor Mommsen et alii, Corpus Inscriptionum Latinarum (The Body of Latin Inscriptions, abbreviated CIL), Berlin-Brandenburgische Akademie der Wissenschaften (1853–present).
- Giovanni Battista Brusin, Inscriptiones Aquileiae (Inscriptions of Aquileia, abbreviated InscrAqu), Udine (1991–1993).
