= Tussidia gens =

Ancient Roman family

The gens Tussidia or Tusidia was an obscure plebeian family at ancient Rome. No members of this gens are mentioned by Roman writers, but a number are known from inscriptions, including Lucius Tusidius Campester, who attained the consulship in AD 142.

== Origin ==
The nomen gentilicium Tussidius belongs to a large class of gentilicia originally formed from cognomina ending in -idus When these became numerous, -idius came to be regarded as a regular gentile-forming suffix, and was frequently applied without regard to morphology. The largest number of Tussidii not found in epigraphy from Rome came from Picenum, likely the family's place of origin.

== Praenomina ==
The main praenomina used by the Tussidii were Lucius, Gaius, and Quintus, all of which were amongst the most common names at all periods of Roman history. The only other praenomen found in the epigraphy of this gens is Sextus, which was also common, although less so than the others.

== Members ==
This list includes abbreviated praenomina. For an explanation of this practice, see filiation.

- Quintus Tussidius Dexter, named in pottery inscriptions from Virunum in Noricum, dating from the first half of the first century.
- Gaius Tussidius C. f. Marcianus, aedile at Tifernum Tiberinum in Umbria, at some point during the early first century.
- Lucius Tussidius Verus, named in a wooden inscription from Pompeii in Campania.
- Tussidia L. l. Chloë, inurned in a first-century cinerarium from Firmum in Picenum.
- Tusidius Primus, together with Cispia Ciprinia Calliste, (Note: The reading of her name is uncertain. In CIL IX 5872, it is Ciprinia, but in CIL XI 5653 it is Cispia.) dedicated a tomb at either Matilica in Umbria or Auximum in Picenum, dating between the last quarter of the first century and the end of the second, for their young son, Herennius Primianus, aged three years, nine months, and twenty-seven days.
- Tussidia Barbara, dedicated a tomb at Rome, dating from the first half of the second century, for her son, Julius Potentinus, a soldier in the fifth cohort of the praetorian guard, serving in the century of Superus. At least part of the inscription is thought to be modern.
- Lucius Tusidius L. f. Campester, probably a native of Ricina in Picenum, was consul suffectus in AD 142, serving from the Kalends of September to the Kalends of November. His colleague was Quintus Cornelius Senecio Annianus. He had previously been a military tribune in the Legio X Gemina.
- Lucius Tusidius L. f. Sabinianus, a native of Planina in Picenum, was a soldier in the seventh cohort of the praetorian guard at Rome, serving in the century of Iedarnus. He built a tomb at Rome for his colleague, Quintus Mettius Primitivus of Cremona, dating between AD 100 and 180.
- Lucius Tusidius, along with his siblings, Tusidius Speratus and Tusidia Prisca, built a second-century family sepulchre at Rome for themselves and their late brother, Tusidius Felix.
- Tusidius Cyrus, dedicated a second-century monument at Ricina for his wife, Cassia.
- Tusidius Felix, a young man buried at Rome, aged nineteen years, three months, in a second-century family sepulchre built by his siblings, Lucius Tusidius, Tusidius Speratus, and Tusidia Prisca.
- Tusidia Gemella, the wife of Titus Simnius Felix, with whom she dedicated a second-century tomb at Ricina for their daughter, Lysistrata.
- Tusidia Prisca, along with her brothers, Lucius Tusidius and Tusidius Speratus, built a second-century family sepulchre at Rome for themselves and their late brother, Tusidius Felix.
- Tussidius Speratus, along with his siblings, Lucius Tusidius and Tusidia Prima, built a second-century family sepulchre at Rome for themselves and their late brother, Tusidius Felix.
- Tussidius Ba[...], buried at Rome in a tomb built by his wife, Aurelia Fl[...], dating between the last quarter of the second century, and the middle of the third.
- Tussidius, a man who lived at the end of third century. He was married to Turcia Marcella, daughter of Lucius Turcius Faesasius Apronianus, suffect consul somewhere during the 3rd century, and sister of Lucius Turcius Secundus, suffect consul c. 300. He probably descended from Lucius Tussidius Campester.

=== Undated Tussidii ===
- Tussidia, perhaps a sister of Quintus Tussidius Primitivus, for whom she and Primitivus' wife, Crassicia Amanda, dedicated a tomb at Beneventum in Samnium.
- Lucius Tusidius Faventinus, along with his wife, Vettia Rufina, dedicated a tomb at Ricina for their son, Tusidius Jucundus.
- Sextus Tussidius Felix, buried at Ausculum in Apulia, aged twenty, with a monument from his parents, Tussidia Fortunata and Publius Cerrinius Felix.
- Tussidia Fortunaesis, a young woman buried at the site of modern Monte San Biagio, formerly part of Latium, aged fourteen years, three months, and twenty-four days, with a monument from her parents, Thosdeus Uxsicus and Clodia Nate.
- Tussidia Fortunata, along with Publius Cerrinius Felix, dedicated a tomb at Ausculum for their son, Sextus Tussidius Felix.
- Tusidius L. f. Jucundus, buried at Ricina in a tomb dedicated by his parents, Lucius Tusidius Faventinus and Vettia Rufina.
- Lucius Tusidius Num[...], made an offering to the gods at Planina.
- Quintus Tussidius Primitivus, buried at Beneventum, aged fifty-five, with a monument from Crassicia Amanda, his wife of eight years and three months, and Tussidia, perhaps a sister.
- Tussidia Storge, buried at Parentium in Venetia and Histria.
- Gaius Tussidius Verecundus, named in an inscription from Tolosa in Gallia Narbonensis.

== See also ==
- List of Roman gentes

== Bibliography ==
- Theodor Mommsen et alii, Corpus Inscriptionum Latinarum (The Body of Latin Inscriptions, abbreviated CIL), Berlin-Brandenburgische Akademie der Wissenschaften (1853–present).
- Wilhelm Henzen, Ephemeris Epigraphica: Corporis Inscriptionum Latinarum Supplementum (Journal of Inscriptions: Supplement to the Corpus Inscriptionum Latinarum, abbreviated EE), Institute of Roman Archaeology, Rome (1872–1913).
- René Cagnat et alii, L'Année épigraphique (The Year in Epigraphy, abbreviated AE), Presses Universitaires de France (1888–present).
- George Davis Chase, "The Origin of Roman Praenomina", in Harvard Studies in Classical Philology, vol. VIII, pp. 103–184 (1897).
- Anna Gerstl, Supplementum Epigraphicum zu CIL III für Kärnten und Osttirol (Epigraphic Supplement to CIL III for Carinthia and East Tyrol), Vienna, (1902–1961).
- Annona Epigraphica Austriaca (Epigraphy of Austria Annual, abbreviated AEA) (1979–present).
