= Pasquale Ciaramponi =

Italian painter

Pasquale Ciaramponi (20 May 1734 – 27 October 1792) was an Italian painter active in the Marche region in a late-Baroque style.

== Biography ==
He was born in Treia, in the province of Macerata. He trained initially under Pompeo Batoni. He then moved to Rome, where he entered the studio of Gaetano Lapis. He returned to Treia and the Marche, where he painted portraits and sacred subjects. Among his works were paintings for:

- Frescoes in the tribune of San Francesco, Treia
- Altarpiece for San Filippo Neri, Treia
- San Vincenzo, San Domenico, Cingoli
- Altarpieces, Chiesa del Sagramento, Ancona
