= Satellia gens =

The gens Satellia was an obscure plebeian family of equestrian rank at ancient Rome. Few members of this gens are mentioned in ancient writers, but a number are known from inscriptions.

== Origin ==
The nomen Satellius belongs to a class of gentilicia formed mainly from cognomina ending in the diminutive suffixes -illus and -ellus. There is no evidence of a surname Satellus, so the nomen is probably derived from satelles, an attendant, follower, or by extension, a bodyguard; the same word is the source of the English satellite.

== Praenomina ==
The main praenomina of the Satellii were Gaius and Marcus, two of the most common names throughout all periods of Roman history. The family occasionally used other common praenomina, including Lucius, Publius, Quintus, and Titus.

== Members ==
This list includes abbreviated praenomina. For an explanation of this practice, see filiation.

- Marcus Satellius Q. f. Marcellus, one of the Seviri Augustales at Mevaniola in Umbria, where he built a tomb for himself and the freedwoman Muronia Prima, perhaps his wife, dating to the first part of the first century AD.
- Gaius Satellius C. l. Myrtilus, a freedman buried at Septempeda in Picenum, together with his wife, the freedwoman Naevia Salvia, in a tomb dating to the first half of the first century AD.
- Satellius Quadratus, mentioned by Seneca as a man who ingratiated himself to wealthy patrons, and benefited from their generosity and foolishness. Seneca relates an anecdote about a certain Calvisius Sabinus, who employed slaves to provide him with literary and historical names and references that he had been unable to learn; Satellius suggested that whole book-cases would have been cheaper.
- Titus Satellius Eutychus, built a family sepulchre at Rome for himself, his wife, Suavettia Lachesis, and their sons, Titus Satellius Eutychus, and Titus Satellius Lascivus, dating to the late first century AD.
- Titus Satellius T. f. Eutychus, the son of Titus Satellius Eutychus and Suavettia Lachesis, buried in a late first-century family sepulchre at Rome.
- Titus Satellius T. f. Lascivus, the son of Titus Satellius Eutychus and Suavettia Lachesis, buried in a late first-century family sepulchre at Rome.
- Marcus Satellius Eros, made a libationary offering to Hercules at Scarbantia in Pannonia Superior, some time in the second century.
- Satellius Faustinus, died on the thirteenth day before the Kalends of December (Note: November 19.) in AD 393, aged thirty, and was buried at Altava in Mauretania Caesariensis.
- Satellius Faustinus, died on the sixth day before the Ides of October (Note: October 10.) in AD 412, aged eighteen, and was buried at Altava.

=== Undated Satellii ===
- Satellia, the mother of Aulus Papirius, named in an inscription of her son, also named Aulus Papirius, at Clusium in Etruria.
- Satellia M. f. Anus, restored the apodyterium, or dressing room, of the Roman baths at Casilinum in Campania, and had the epistyle decorated with marble.
- Gaius Satellius Asper, together with his wife, Glitia Mansueta, dedicated a tomb at Rome to their son, Gaius Satellius Clemens.
- Gaius Satellius C. f. Clemens, buried at Rome with a monument from his parents, Gaius Satellius Asper and Glitia Mansueta.
- Gaius Satellius Felix, guardian of the Lares at Scarbantia.
- Marcus Satellius Florus, dedicated a tomb at Rome to Gaius Vettenus Socratus and Vettena Prima.
- Gaius Satellius Januarius, an eques, dedicated a monument at Cirta in Numidia to his son, Marcus Satellius Rufinus Pancratius.
- Satellia L. f. Maxuma, buried at Verona in Venetia and Histria, together with her husband and son, both named Marcus Virraus.
- Satellia C. l. Philematium, the wife of Gaius Vettius Plintha, named in two inscriptions from Clusium.
- Marcus Satellius C. f. Rufinus Pancratius, a young man of equestrian rank, buried at Cirta, aged seventeen years, nine months, and ten days, with a monument from his father, Gaius Satellius Januarius.
- Satellia Severa, buried at Rome with a monument from her son, Tifernius Severus.
- Marcus Satellius Severus, a little boy buried at Rome, aged three years, ten months, and two days.
- Publius Satellius C. f. Sodalis, a merchant buried at Carnuntum in Pannonia Superior, with a monument from his uncle, Quintus Varius Modestus.
- Satellius Turanus, a member of the shipwrights' guild at Portus in Latium.
- Marcus Satellius Tychius, the master of Felix, a slave buried at Rome, aged nineteen.
- Satellia C. f. Velizza, named in an inscription from Clusium.

== See also ==
- List of Roman gentes

== Bibliography ==
- Lucius Annaeus Seneca (Seneca the Younger), Epistulae Morales ad Lucilium (Moral Letters to Lucilius).
- Theodor Mommsen et alii, Corpus Inscriptionum Latinarum (The Body of Latin Inscriptions, abbreviated CIL), Berlin-Brandenburgische Akademie der Wissenschaften (1853–present).
- René Cagnat et alii, L'Année épigraphique (The Year in Epigraphy, abbreviated AE), Presses Universitaires de France (1888–present).
- George Davis Chase, "The Origin of Roman Praenomina", in Harvard Studies in Classical Philology, vol. VIII, pp. 103–184 (1897).
- Paul von Rohden, Elimar Klebs, & Hermann Dessau, Prosopographia Imperii Romani (The Prosopography of the Roman Empire, abbreviated PIR), Berlin (1898).
- Jean Marcillet-Jaubert, Les Inscriptions d’Altava (The Inscriptions of Altava), Aix-en-Provence (1968).
- John C. Traupman, The New College Latin & English Dictionary, Bantam Books, New York (1995).
