= San Michele, Treia =

Roman Catholic church in Treia, Italy

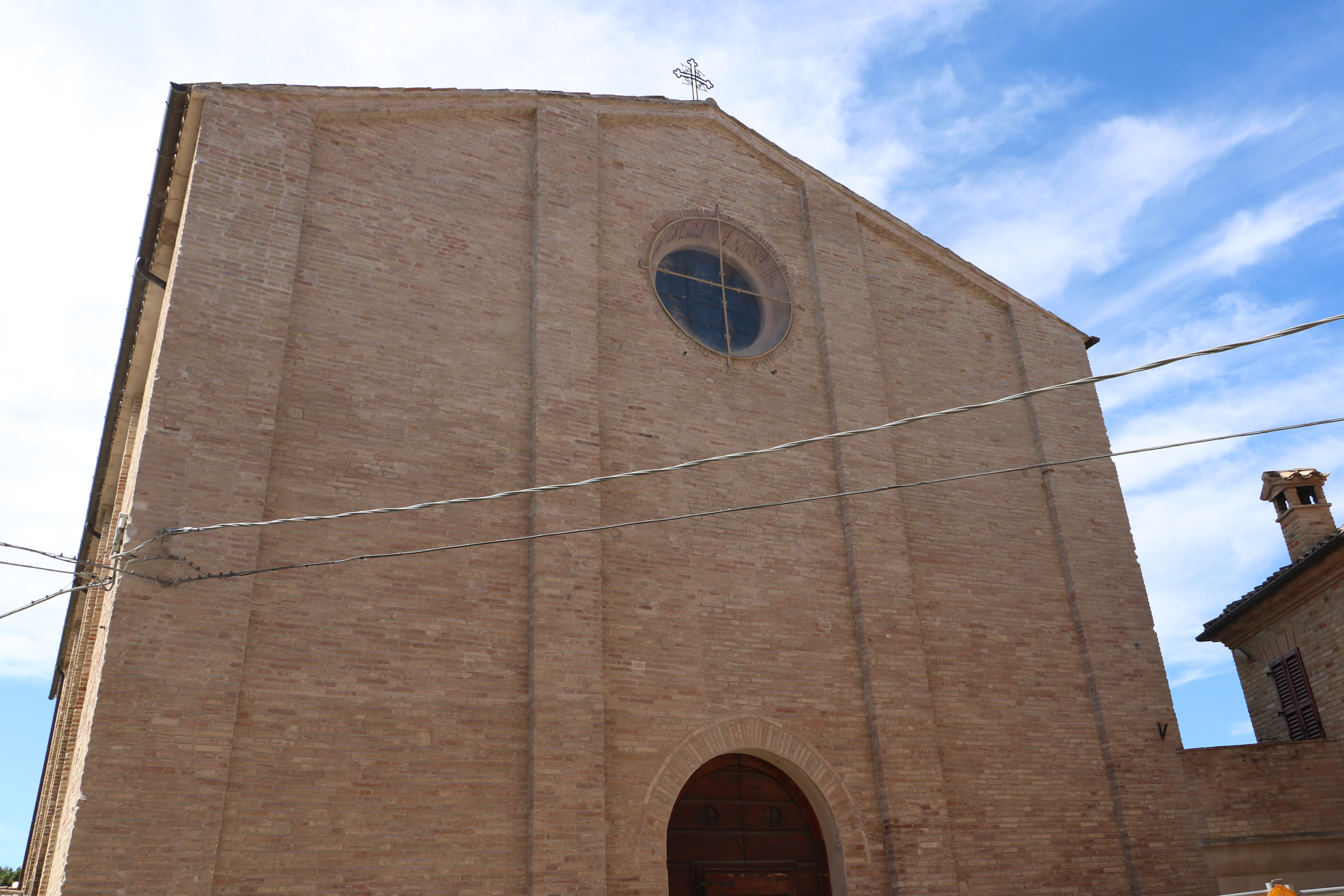
San Michele Catholic Church

San Michele is a Romanesque and Gothic-style, Roman Catholic church in the city of Treia, province of Macerata, Italy.

== History ==
The church was once attached to the Lombard castle, the Castello dell’Onglavina, overlooking the town. The attached tower, once likely belonged to the castle. In 1357, the church was rebuilt and re-oriented at right angle to the original church. The interior is subdivided into three naves by sturdy pilasters leading to ogival arches. The narrow windows also have acute arches. The church, built of brick has fresco fragments from the 12-14th centuries on the walls of the nave.
