= Potentia (ancient city) =

Ancient Roman coastal community

Coordinates: 43.41410°N 13.67120°E

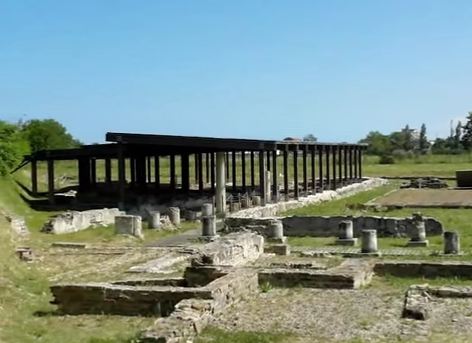
- Archaeological area of Potentia
- Interactive map of Potentia
- Type: Settlement
- Periods: Roman Republic - Byzantine Empire
- Cultures: Ancient Rome
- Location: Porto Recanati, province of Macerata, Marche, Italy

History
- Built: 2nd century BC
- Abandoned: 5th century

Potentia was a Roman town along the central Adriatic Italian coast, near the modern town of Porto Recanati, in the province of Macerata. Its original position was just north of the main Roman bed of the River Potenza (the ancient Flosis), which now flows more than 1 km (0.62 mi) to the north.

== History ==
In 268 BC, the central Adriatic homeland of the local Picene peoples was military dominated and incorporated by the Romans. Later, under emperor Augustus, it was organized as Regio V Picenum. The installation of a series of mostly maritime Latin and Roman colonies during the second part of the 3rd and the 2nd centuries BC was a major impulse for the Romanization of a region that knew no real urbanized society before. In 184 BC, with the foundation of Potentia, a coastal colony for Roman citizens (mentioned by Livy), the lower Potenza valley, and with it the whole area of northern Picenum, entered its first phase of real urbanization. By 174 BC, the colony probably received a circuit wall with three arched gates, a street network with sewers, an aqueduct, a temple to Jupiter, and a portico with shops enclosing the forum.

The flourishing of the town from the Augustan Age onwards far into the late 2nd century AD, is attested by epigraphic evidence. From the 3rd century AD onwards, the lack of significant numbers of inscriptions could point to a decline in the city’s prosperity. Although the city became an Episcopal seat around AD 400 and is still mentioned in sources at the beginning of the 7th century AD, Potentia clearly did not survive into the Middle Ages.

== Archaeological and historical research ==
Nereo Alfieri, an Italian specialist in ancient topography, located the archaeological site of Potentia in 1940. The first architectural remains were investigated in the 1960s-70s under the direction of Liliana Mercando. Between 1986 and 2006 systematic excavation campaigns under the direction of Edvige Percossi of the Soprintendenza per i Beni Archeologici delle Marche, have been organized. These excavations revealed a late Republican temple (2nd century BC) surrounded by a portico and other buildings of Republican and Imperial Age. The Potenza Valley Survey Project (Ghent University), under the direction of prof. Frank Vermeulen, made it possible to understand the wider picture of the city’s plan and development. Due to intensive aerial coverage, geomorphological approaches, artefact surveys and studies, geophysical prospections, and the excavation of the western city gate there is now a more defined chronological interpretation of the site as well as a comprehensive cartographic mapping of its main features.

== Archaeological remains from the late Republic and early Empire ==
=== City wall, gates, and streets ===
The city has a strictly rectangular town plan of c. 525 x 350 m (around 18), and is laid out parallel with the coast. The urban area is subdivided by a regular network of streets oriented parallel with the walls, thus forming city blocks or insulae (a minimum of 58) of different dimensions. Fairly central to the plan are the principal streets, the cardo and decumanus maximus, with the forum square set south west of their crossroads. The regular street system consist of cardines and decumani neatly parallel and perpendicular with the main axes. According to the evidence from the surveys and the excavations they are some 5 m wide and normally consist of a surface of battered river pebbles. Excavations have revealed that at least some of them had one or two parallel footpaths and brick sewers, which lay underneath the roadway. It is likely that the city wall incorporated three major gates, as suggested by Livy’s account. The northern and western gates, both more or less centrally placed on the respective sides of the city and well-connected with the extramural road are securely located. All three roads leaving the city gates were bordered by cemeteries, with funeral monuments facing the roadway.

=== City center ===
Excavations as well as geophysical survey have located several public buildings around the forum square: a possible basilica, a main temple, a possible curia and a food market (macellum). A small theatre lies near the eastern city wall and a possible baths building in the south. The geophysical surveys helped also to distinguish remains and partial plans of many housing units, some of domus type, others clearly tabernae, and others simple habitations and shops, spread all over the many insulae.

=== Date ===
According to the dates of the portico surrounding the excavated temple east of the forum and of the macellum to the north and a luxurious building (domus?) to the east of the temple, the city centre was especially monumentalised in the time of Augustus. Further expansion and investment continued until the Antonines, before major problems hit the town in the "Crisis of the 3rd Century".

== See also ==
- Ancient Ostra
- Archaeological Park of Urbs Salvia
- Ricina
- Sentinum
- Septempeda
- Suasa
