= San Filippo Neri, Treia =

Italian church

Coordinates: 43°18′41″N 13°18′46″E

San Filippo is a Baroque-style, Roman Catholic church located on Piazza della Repubblica in the town of Treia, province of Macerata, region of Marche, Italy.

== History ==
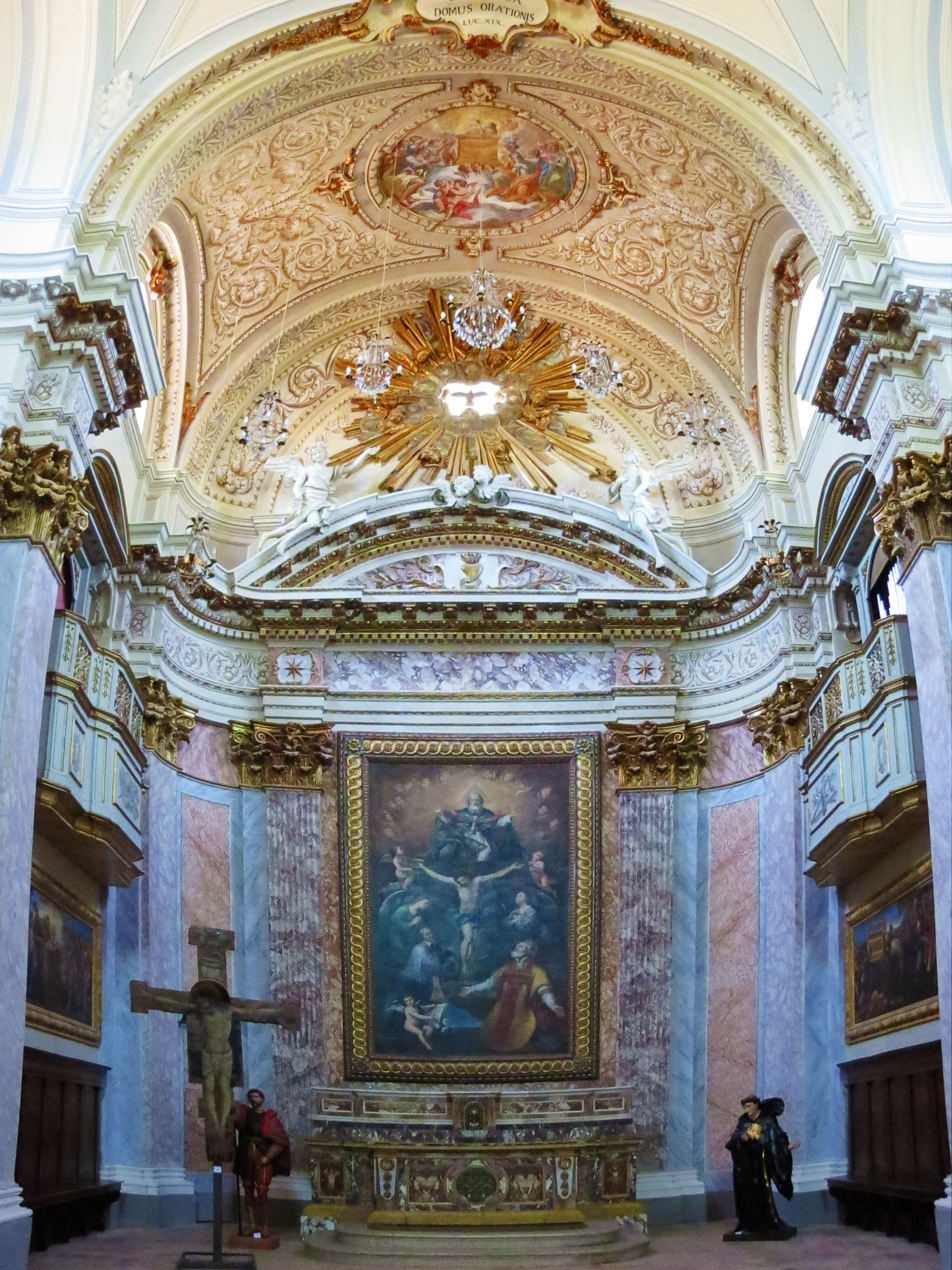
Apse of San Filippo, Treia.

An oratory was founded at the site during the 14th century, and only in the 17th century did the Order of the Oratory of St Philip Neri begin to use the site to build this church, which was consecrated in 1731. In 1767, reconstruction was pursued using a design by Pietro Augustoni, with construction assisted by Tommaso Rossetti. The interiors were decorated by Raffaele Augustoni and Benedetto Silva.

The presbytery has 18th-century wooden choir stalls. The lateral altars have polychrome scagliola or faux marble, with 18th-century altarpieces depicting: Christ in Glory with Saints Anthony Abbot, Ignatius of Loyola, Clement, Francis de Sales and Francis Borgia, and St Carlo Borromeo giving Communion to Saint Aloysius Gonzaga, both painted by Pasquale Ciaramponi. Niches in the walls hold statues depicting the Doctors of the Church and the Evangelists by Gioacchino Varlè.
