= Marlborough gem =

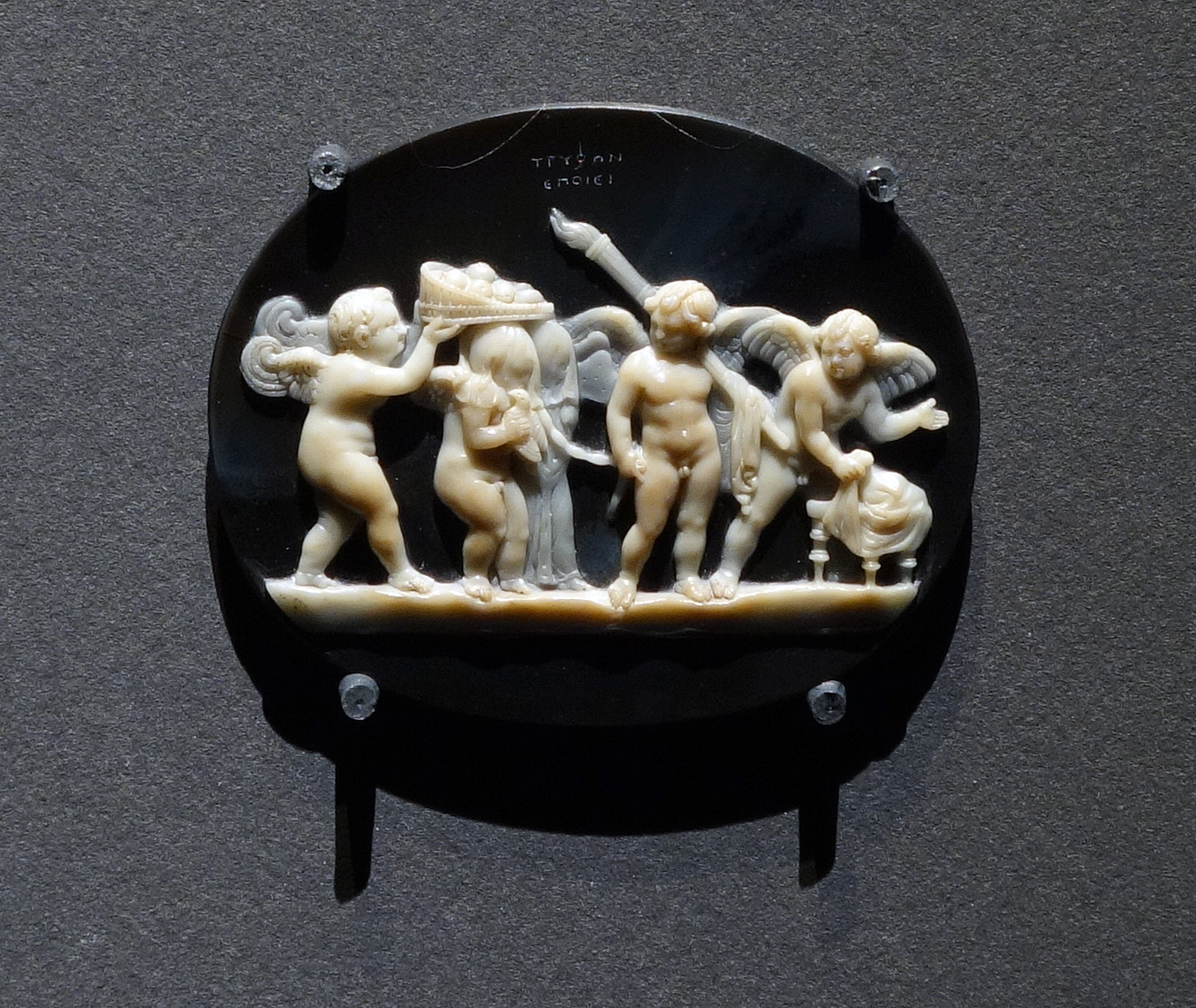
The "Marlborough gem", onyx cameo (Boston Museum of Fine Arts)

The "Marlborough gem" is a carved onyx cameo that depicts an initiation ceremony of Psyche and Eros. It is the most famous engraved gem in the extensive and prominent collection both inherited (through a marriage in 1762) and expanded by George Spencer, 4th Duke of Marlborough. Since 1899 it has been in the collection of the Boston Museum of Fine Arts, where it is described as a "cameo with the wedding of Cupid and Psyche, or an initiation rite", reflecting the view of its subject generally held until the last century.

== Discovery ==
It was discovered in ancient Sentinum and sold in Venice, according to a recently discovered 1572 letter from Costanzo Felici to Ulisse Aldrovandi..

A 16th century drawing attributed to Pirro Ligorio (b. 1512/13 - d. 1583), who served in the court of the Este, shows the cameo (see Maria Elisa Micheli).

== Description and dating ==
In the carving, Cupid and Psyche are depicted as veiled putti accompanied by other infants, one of whom holds over their heads a winnowing-fan filled with pomegranates, emblems of bios and fertility.

The figures are exquisitely carved although only 3/4 inch high, and the details are affectionately portrayed.

Signed in Greek by the artist Tryphon, it is considered to be a Roman work of the late 1st century BC or early 1st century AD.

== 17th-century owners ==
The gem was given by Peter Paul Rubens, who declared that he loved gems beyond all other relics of antiquity, to Thomas Howard, 21st Earl of Arundel, in the 17th century. Another famous gem from the Marlborough Collection that is also sometimes known just as the "Marlborough gem" is a head of Antinous.

The artist's signature is minutely incised into the black background of the stone, just above the central figures in the frieze-like procession. Various 18th-century sources reported that Louis XIV of France had been prepared to offer the equivalent of £4000 in the previous century. An early 16th-century drawing of the subject by the architect and antiquarian Pirro Ligorio was seen among the papers of Rascas de Bagarris recorded by Jacob Spon. The gem was carefully drawn by Theodorus Netscher and engraved by Bernard Picart for Philipp von Stosch's Gemmae antiquae caelatae (1724) which placed its magnified image in the hands of all Europe's antiquarians and rendered it part of the visual repertory of milordi on the Grand Tour, who knew it from its illustration added to the 1728 French edition of the Jonathan Richardsons' (Senior and Junior) Account..., published in French as Traité de la Peinture et de la Sculpture... Amsterdam, 1728; in the 18th century the English could be counted on to pay top prices for outstanding carved hardstones of assured antiquity.

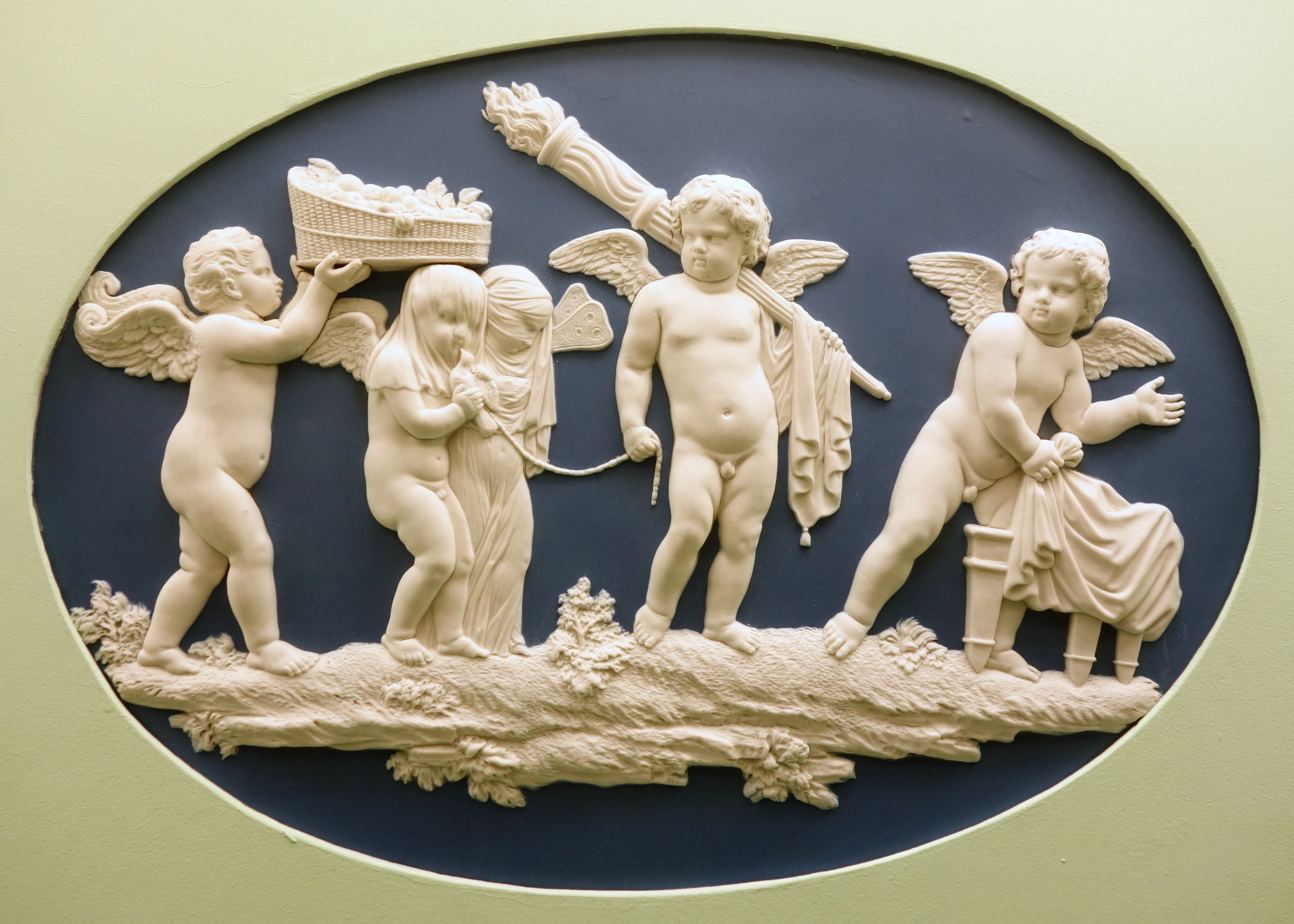
Marriage of Cupid and Psyche (ca. 1773), jasperware by Wedgwood, based on the "Marlborough gem" (Brooklyn Museum)

== Drawings based on the gem ==
Once in the Marlborough collection, the gem was often redrawn: Giovanni Battista Cipriani painted a version of the gem, Francesco Bartolozzi engraved it, James Tassie cast it in opaque coloured glass paste, and for Josiah Wedgwood, first William Hackwood reproduced a low relief from Tassie's cast, and then John Flaxman modeled it at a larger scale; both versions were executed in Wedgwood & Bentley's white-on-blue jasperware that imitated cameos; the "Marlborough gem" first appeared in Wedgwood's 1779 catalogue. The Wedgwood plaque, available in several sizes, appears mounted on Parisian and London furniture, and a marble relief of the scene is set in the chimneypiece of the red drawing room at the original home of the Marlborough gems.

It became so familiar that the caricaturist James Gillray engraved a parody of it in 1797, lampooning the long-delayed marriage of Lord Derby to the actress Elizabeth Farren, who is travestied as a tall, lanky veiled figure, who is offered a countess's coronet instead of the winnowing fan of pomegranates, with the plump cherubic Lord Derby at her side. By 1870 the Marlborough collection cataloguer observed, "the design has been reproduced in all sorts and materials of art, perhaps oftener than any other similar subject."

== Owners since the 1870s ==
John Spencer-Churchill, 7th Duke of Marlborough, sold the gem, catalogued as "The Marriage of Cupid and Psyche", together with the other Marlborough gems, at Christie Manson & Wood, London, in 1875. The collection, sold in a single lot that brought £35,000, went to David Bromilow of Bitteswell Hall, Leicestershire, who maintained the collection intact; when his daughter subsequently sold the Marlborough gem with the rest of the Bromilow Marlborough hardstones at Christie's on July 26–29, 1899, the cameo was sold for £2000. The collection is now very widely dispersed, with large numbers in American museums.
