= Severinus of Sanseverino and Victorinus of Camerino =

Saints Severinus of Sanseverino and Victorinus of Camerino
- Died: 550 (Severinus); 543 (Victorinus)
- Venerated in: Roman Catholic Church
- Feast: June 8
- Patronage: Pioraco

Saints Severinus of Sanseverino (or of Septempeda) (d. 550 AD) and Victorinus of Camerino (d. 543 AD) were brothers who served as bishops and hermits in the 6th century.

== Biography ==
The brothers were noblemen who gave away much of their wealth to the poor before becoming hermits at Monte Nero near Septempeda.

Victorinus later withdrew to a cave near Pioraco. Victorinus was prone to strong temptations, and he inflicted upon himself a difficult and painful penance: he had himself tied to a tree, with his hands clasped between two branches. Victorinus’ particular method of self-mortification was depicted on a small panel in the church of San Venanzio, in Camerino, by the artist Niccolò da Foligno (called l'Alunno), who created the piece between 1478–80.

However, in 540 Pope Vigilius appointed them each as bishops of two separate sees: Severinus became bishop of what was then called Septempeda, later called San Severino Marche after him, in Marche; Victorinus became bishop of Camerino.

Severinus died in 545. His remains were concealed in the Cathedral of Saint Maria in Septempeda to protect them from looting, and were rediscovered in 590 during restoration works, after which they were transferred to Monte Nero.

== Veneration ==
A church dedicated to San Vittorino exists in Pioraco. Their joint feast day is June 8.
