= San Francesco, Treia =

Church building in Treia, Italy

Coordinates: 43.309619°N 13.314108°E

San Francesco is a Gothic-style, Roman Catholic church in the city of Treia, province of Macerata, Italy.

== History ==
The church was erected inside the city walls in 1300. It underwent reconstruction from the 17th to 18th centuries using designs by the architect Giovanni Battista Rusca. The original church nave walls were likely covered with frescoes, of which only some from the 16th century have survived. The include a Pietà (1549) and a fresco of the Madonna and Child with Saints.
