= Ricina =

Ancient Roman town

- Recina, Helvia Recina
- Helvia Recina
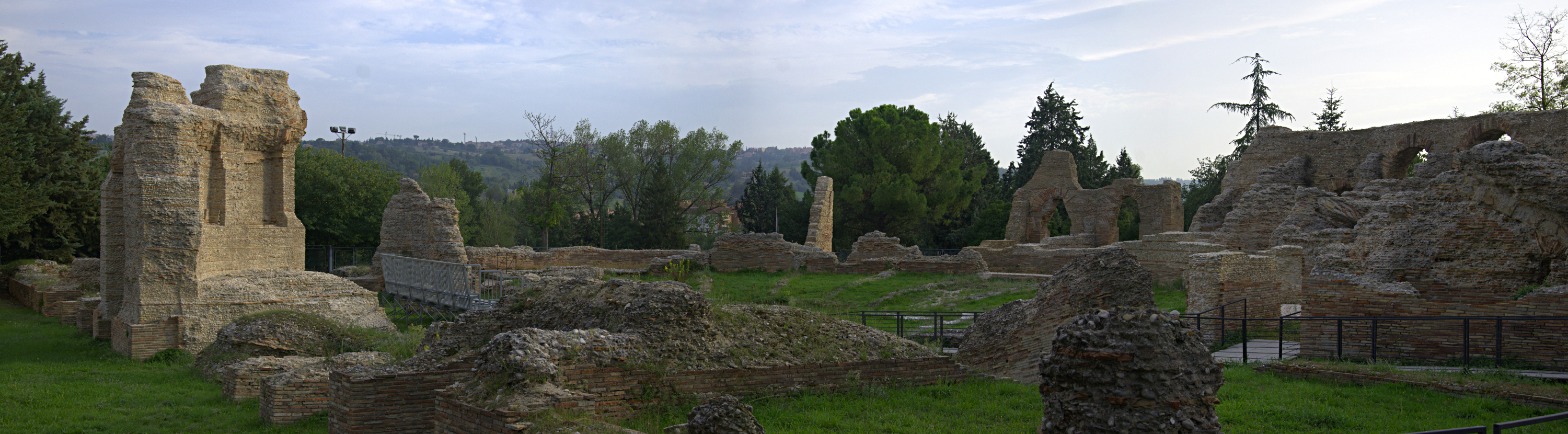
- Helvia Recina - Roman Theatre

- Location within Italy
- 43°19′40.64″N 13°25′26.72″E
- Type: Settlement
- Periods: Roman Republic - Byzantine Empire
- Cultures: Ancient Rome
- Location: Villa Potenza, Province of Macerata, Marche, Italy

History
- Built: 3rd century BC
- Abandoned: 5th century

Site notes
- Condition: Ruined
- Owner: Public
- Management: Soprintendenza per i Beni Archeologici delle Marche
- Public access: Yes

Ricina or Helvia Recina (located in present-day Villa Potenza) was a Roman town located in the lower Potenza valley, the contemporary Italian region Marche.

== Geography ==
In the lower Potenza valley, on the left bank of the river Flosis (modern River Potenza), some 15 km from the estuary of the river, lies the Roman town of Ricina. The area today is in part occupied by the small hamlet of Villa Potenza, part of the comune of Macerata, and is partially used as farmland. The town is located at the junction of the river Flosis with a crossroad of the Via Salaria Gallica Gallica and a byroad of the Via Flaminia.

== History ==
Due to small-scale rescue digs in several parts of the town, it is suggested that Ricina was already quite extensively occupied from the later 2nd century BC on however most of the urban evidence belongs to the period between the 1st century BC and the 4th century AD. Ricina became a municipium from the mid-1st century BC when the first colonists, veterans of the Civil Wars, were settled here. It flourished under the reigns of Augustus (27 BC - AD 14) and Tiberius (AD 14–37) to judge by a series of funerary monuments and inscriptions which probably originate from a cemetery on the SW side, the construction of an aqueduct, and the largest theatre in Picenum. During the 2nd century AD a good deal of public building was achieved and squares and streets were repaved. Traces of a baths complex near the theatre and parts of houses with mosaic floors are also dated to the 2nd century AD. But as early as the first half of the 2nd century AD the municipal finances seem to decline when a curator rei publicae Riciniensium was appointed. During the reign of Septimius Severus (AD 193–211), the town became a colony with the name Helvia Ricina Pertinax (CIL IX 5747), in honour of Septimius’ predecessor. The town may have suffered from invasions in the 5th and 6th centuries AD, with the remaining population seeking new dwellings in the hills to the east and west of the former Roman town.

== Research ==
Due to several aerial photography campaigns and surveys on the farmland conducted by the Potenza Valley Survey Project (Ghent University) more information has been available about the general layout and organization of the town. Recently in July and October 2013, also geophysical surveys were undertaken by the geophysical survey company Eastern Atlas with the objective of locating and mapping more remains of subsurface archaeological features in Trea. Also the recent study of the Roman pottery to deliver chronological clues and help to determine functional zones as well as the study of stone architectural decoration to gain more insights in the embellishment of the town, has led to more information.

It seems that the layout of the town was a fairly regular and quite flat, almost rectangular area of c. 22 ha. The valley road from Trea to Potentia crossed roughly the centre of town from southwest to northeast and served as its main decumanus. One main NW-SE axis, if confirmed by further fieldwork, could have linked the main decumanus with the Roman bridge over the Potenza, which earlier observations located a few meters upstream from the present-day bridge. This street passed directly in front of and parallel with the stage building of the theatre.

The forum was probably located near the intersection of the north–south axis with the main decumanus. Although a major part of the ancient town is built over by the houses and streets of Villa Potenza, several large buildings can be distinguished in the crops of the fields north of the central area. One of them is a rectangular building (at least 18 x 33 m) oriented northwest–southeast, perpendicular to the main decumanus and possibly bordering a forum on its south. This was probably the main temple (Capitolium?) of Helvia Ricina. Other traces of buildings may be seen in the fields: several large domus, a large cistern, which may point to a nearby public facility or baths and a row of similar rectangular rooms, flanked by a corridor or portico suggest a set of tabernae or possibly a horreum. The latter is supported by the presence of many dolia and amphora sherds found at this location.

There are also signs of habitation outside the walls, more specifically directly southwest of the town, outside the presumed location of the southwest gate and alongside the road to Trea as well as at the northeast side of the town were crop-marks and a wide scatter of Roman material point to an extramural settlement.

The theatre is the only well-preserved remain of the city above ground. It has a cavea of 71.80 m diameter and is now surrounded by modern houses of Villa Potenza. During an aerial photography campaign conducted by the PVS team in May 2009 clear traces of an amphitheatre were detected as well. The building, positioned east of the theatre, was possibly originally connected with it and thus formed part of one architectural complex.

Because of its position on the main east–west road along the valley to the coastal town of Potentia, which acts as the town's decumanus, Ricina can be characterized as a road-town.

== See also ==
- Archaeological Park of Urbs Salvia
- Ancient Ostra
- Potentia (ancient city)
- Sentinum
- Septempeda
- Suasa
