= Sentinum =

Ancient Roman town

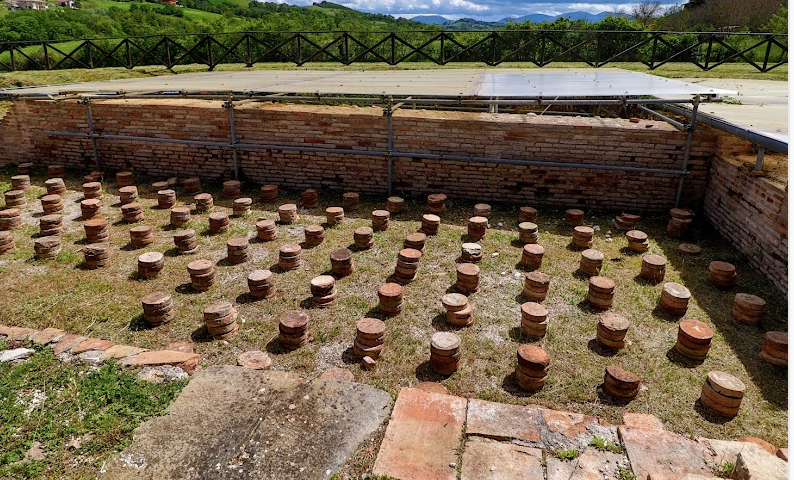
- Baths: Hypocaust under hot pool

- Location within Italy
- 43°25′6.56″N 12°51′8.1″E
- Cultures: Ancient Rome
- Location: Sassoferrato, Province of Ancona, Marche, Italy

Site notes
- Owner: Public

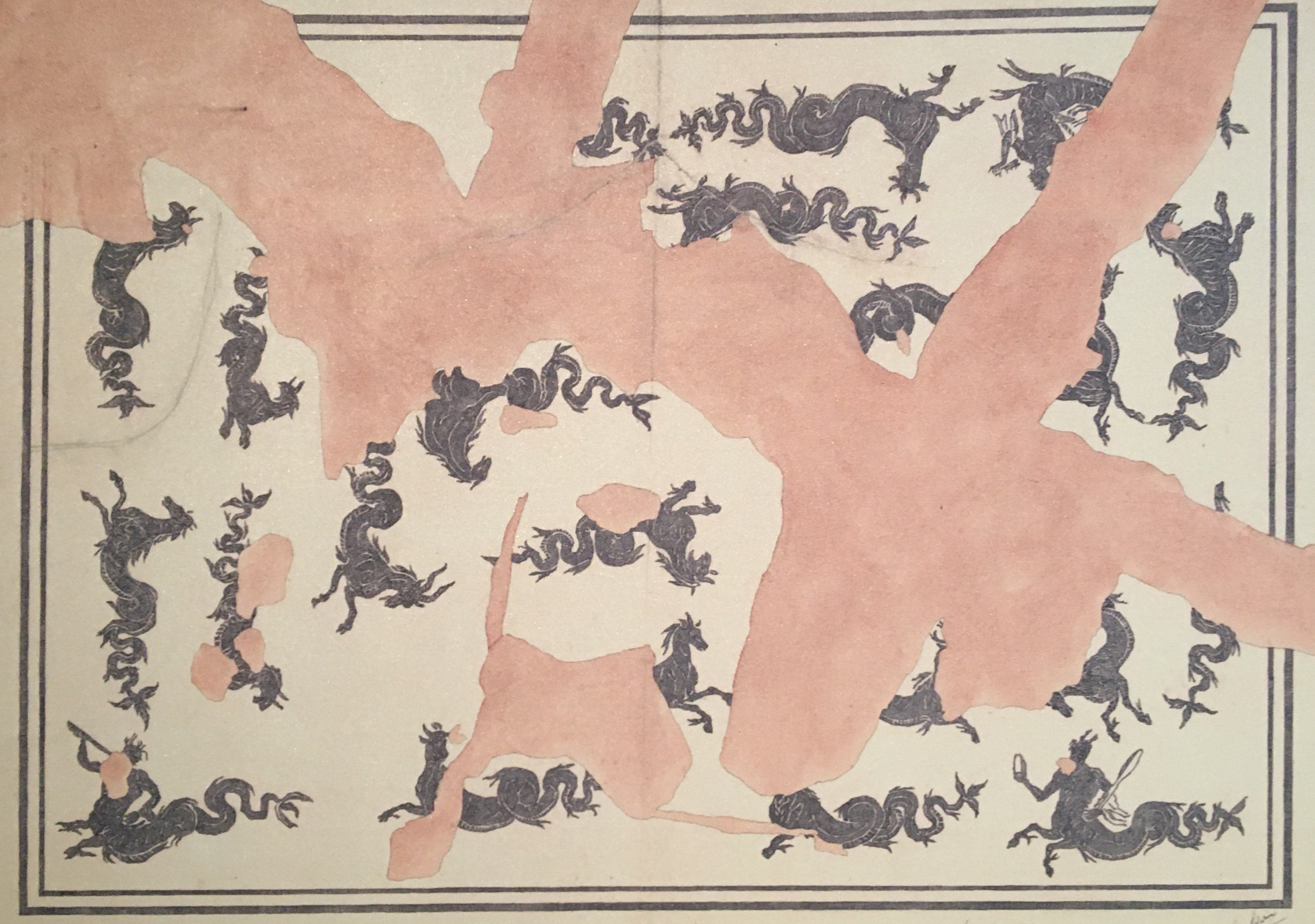
Sea-monster mosaic

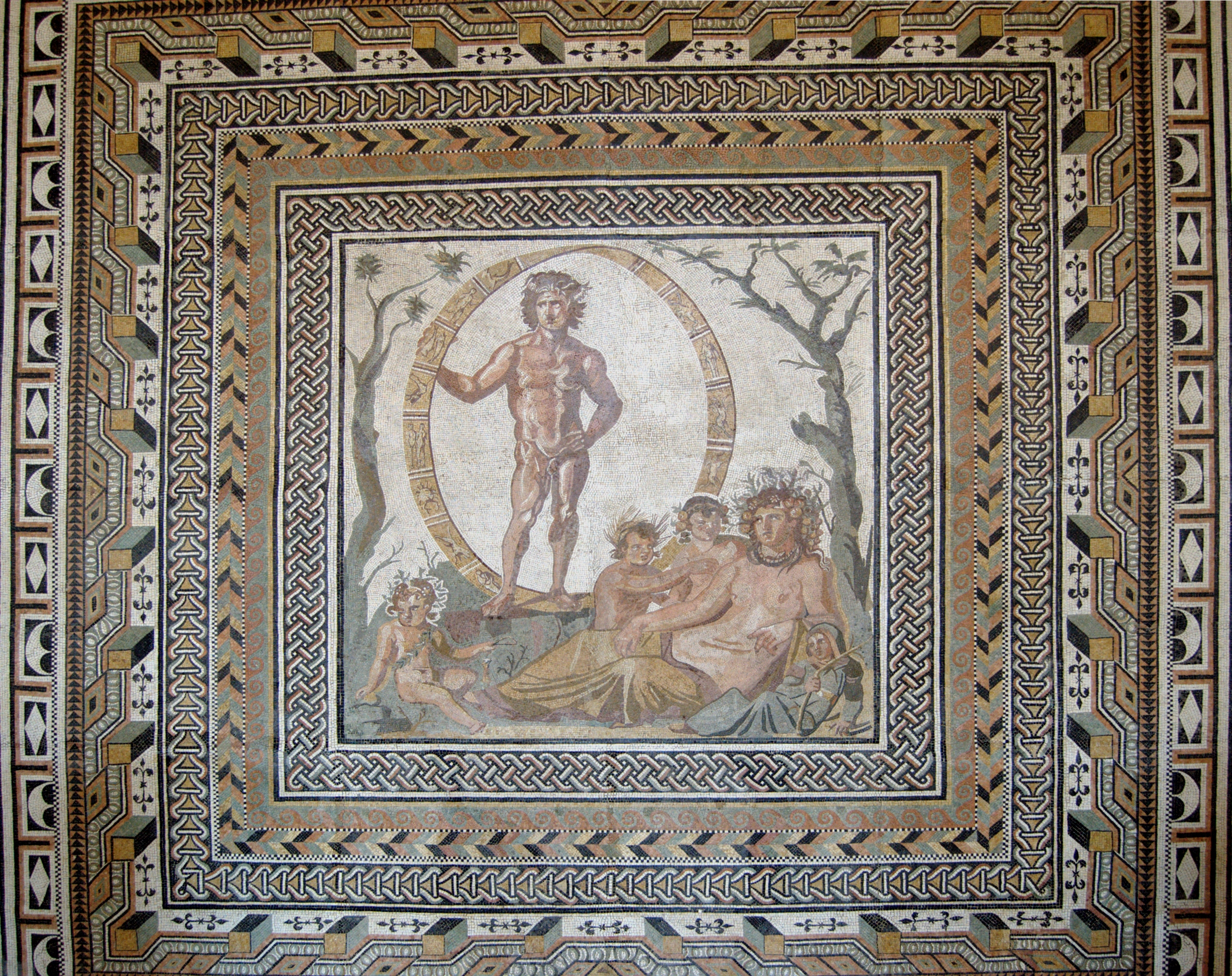
Mosaic floor depicting Aion and Tellus in richly-patterned framing from Sentinum (Glyptothek, Munich)

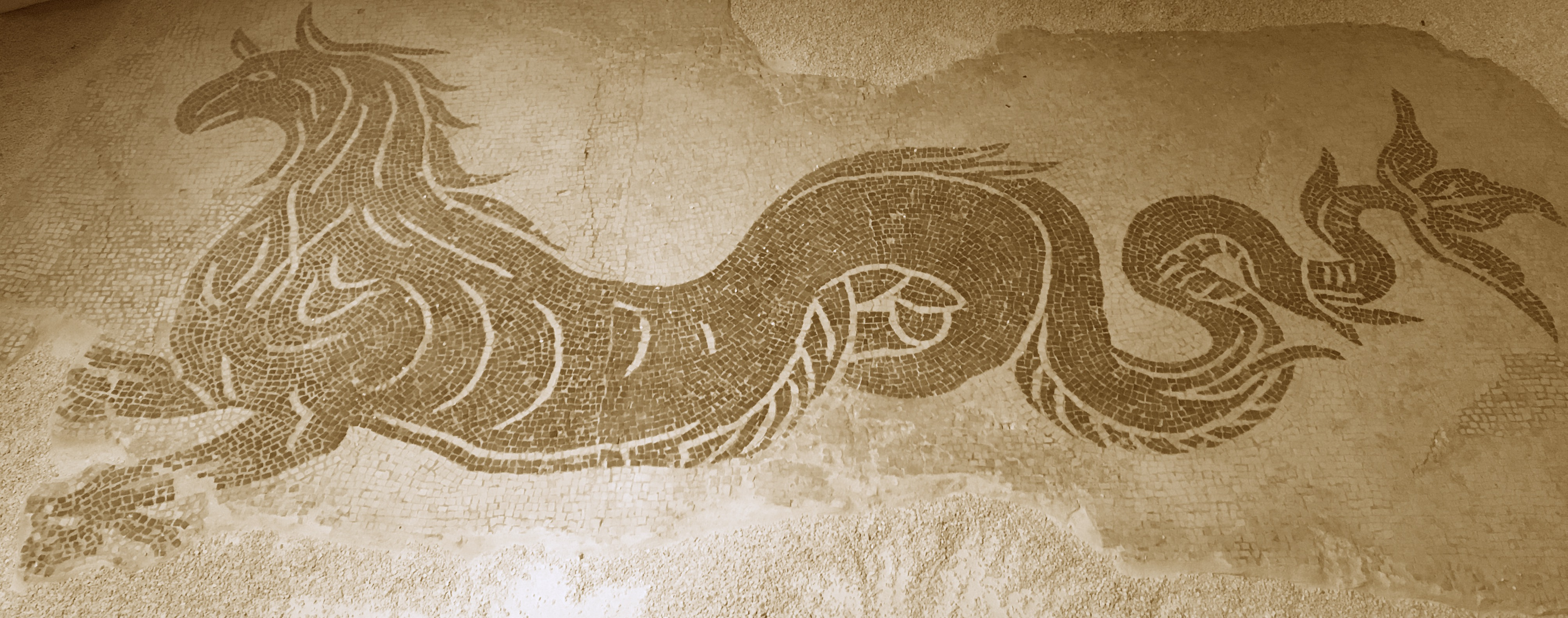
Sea-monster mosaic (detail)

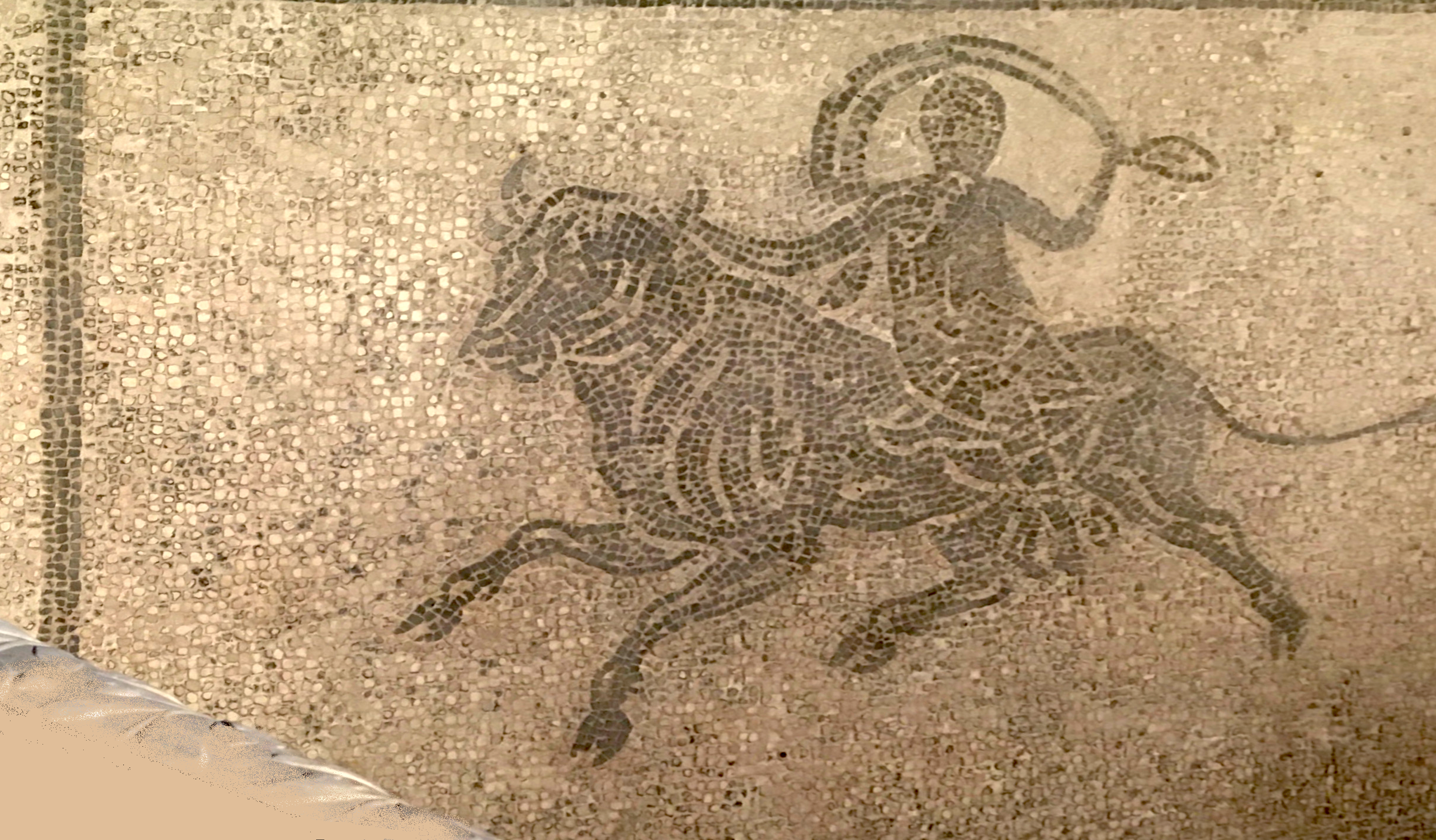
Abduction of Europa mosaic

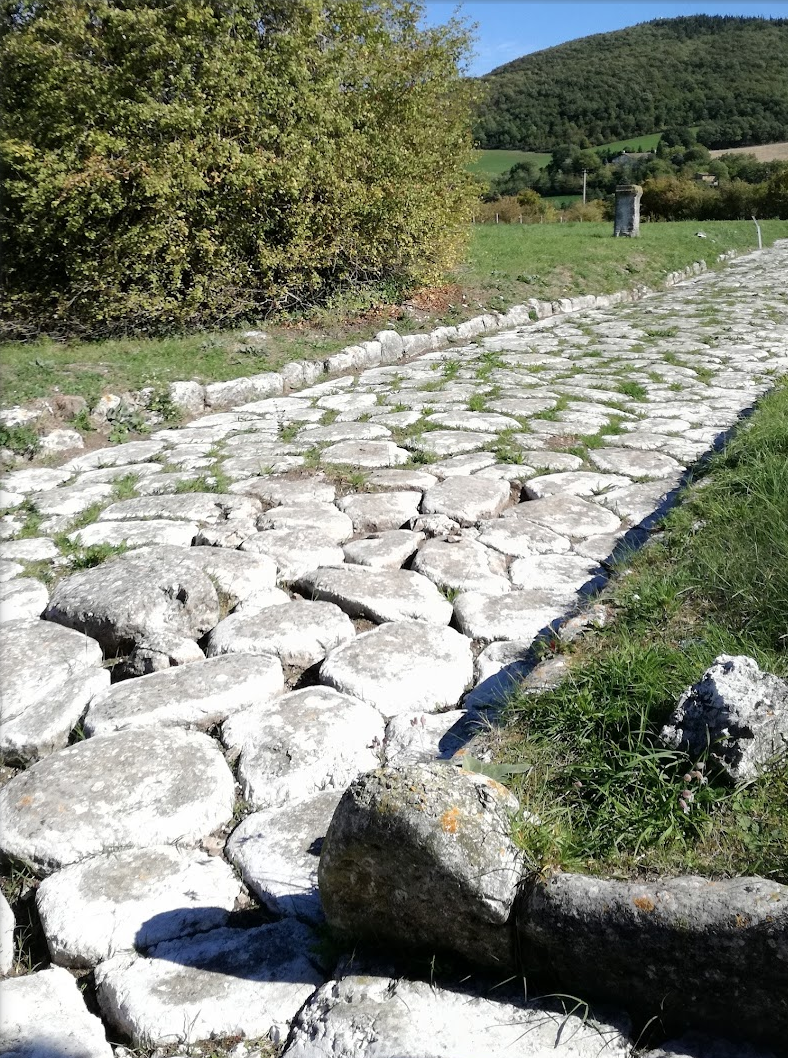
Cardo and decumanus

Sentinum was a Roman town now located about a kilometre south of the present-day town of Sassoferrato in the Marche region of Italy.

Two areas of the town, the forum/urban baths and the suburban baths, can be visited today protected as an archaeological park.

The local museum contains many finds from Sentinum.

== History ==
The location of the original settlement of Sentinum is unknown and it was probably of Umbrian origin but from 390 BC the Senone Gauls ousted the Umbrians living in this region (between Ariminum and Ancona) and settled there. Sentinum was advantageously located at the confluence of ancient roads that came from Umbria to reach the Adriatic.

The town is best known for the great and decisive Battle of Sentinum which took place nearby during the 3rd Samnite War in 295 BC: the Romans lost 8,700 men but defeated a coalition of Samnites and Senones. In 283 BC after a series of victories, the Romans expelled the Senones from the region after which it became Gallia Togata.

During the civil wars of the 40s BC Sentinum sided with Mark Antony but in 41 BC was taken and destroyed by Quintus Salvidienus Rufus who was leading troops of Octavian. The town was soon rebuilt with a Hippodamian orthogonal plan and Augustan walls in opus vittatum over Roman concrete. It flourished under the Empire as a municipium.

The considerable wealth of the ancient city is evident from the archaeological record, amongst which is the large number of mosaics found in public and private buildings both inside and outside the walls.

Civic life at Sentinum seems to have collapsed at the time of the invasion of Alaric I and not to have recovered.

== Archaeology ==
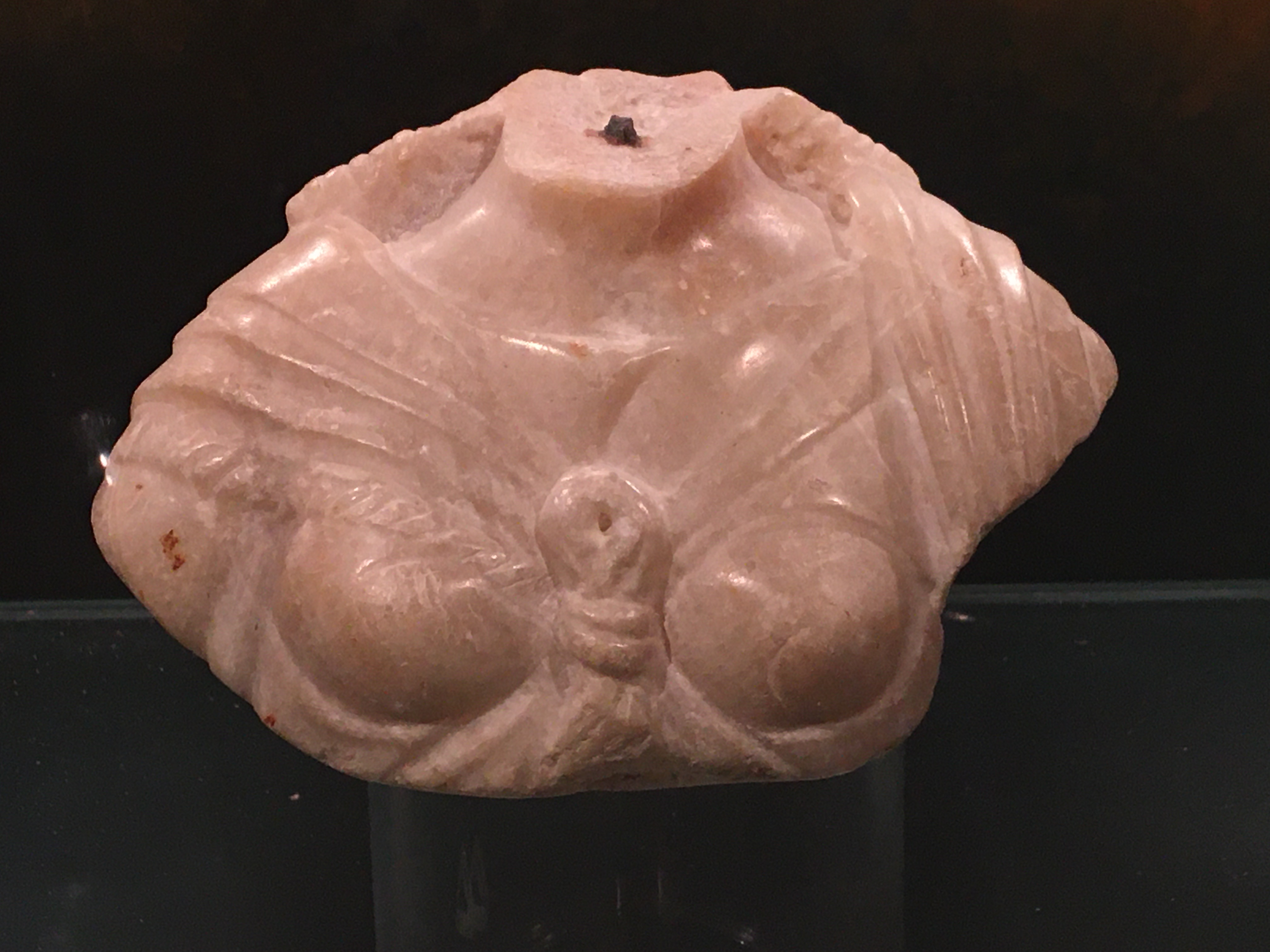
Isis (Alabaster)

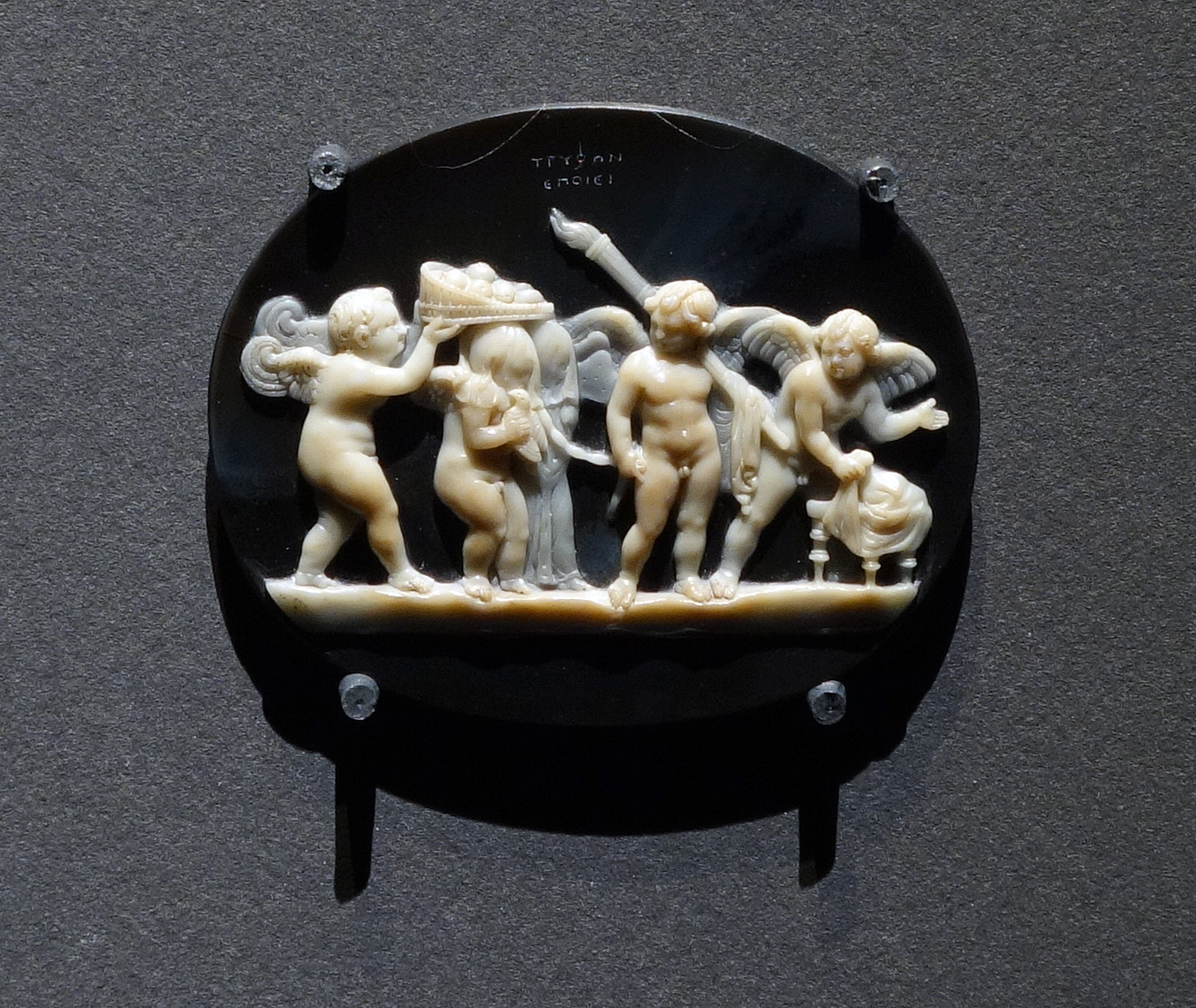
'Marlborough Gem' (Boston MFA)

Since the early Middle Ages the ruins of Sentinum were used as a quarry for construction materials in Sassoferrato and the surrounding areas. The first to take an interest in local antiquities and to rediscover the site were Flavio Biondo and Ciriaco d'Ancona.

The opening of the Fabriano-Urbino railway line cut the city in two and numerous discoveries were made, leading to archeological excavations in 1890 which unearthed city gates, a road, cisterns, and the remains of houses. Notable finds include several mosaic pavements and inscriptions from the second half of the 3rd century AD, including three important tabulae patronatus, records of legal appointments of official patrons.

More recent excavations in 2005-8 found a large circular fountain at the crossroads of the cardo maximus and the decumanus maximus. Among important finds were two marble heads, one from the Julio-Claudian era now in the archaeological museum and a very fine one of a young ephebe.

Of the many mosaics found, some are still in situ and visible such as those in the baths of the archaeological area of Santa Lucia, mostly with black and white tesserae, while others have been preserved in museums.

The most famous mosaic is that of Aion, the young man standing on the left who personifies the eternity of time placed in the circle of the Zodiac, and Terra, Mother Earth, sitting in the right corner with the four seasons. It was found in the insula del Pozzo (for the proximity to an ancient well) in 1806 and preserved in the Glyptothek, Munich. When Aion is associated with the Zodiac and the Seasons, "eternity" is understood as a cyclical, uninterrupted return of events and things: a concept that goes hand-in-hand with that of Saeculum Aureum (Golden Age) and dispenser of fertility and abundance. The idea of eternal return belongs to the "late stoicism", which lasted from the 1st to the 2nd century AD, but which experienced a particular flowering at the time of Antoninus Pius (138-161 AD) to which the mosaic can be dated. Of other depictions of Aion in the Roman Empire four are known:

- the famous "cosmological mosaic" of Augusta Emerita, capital of Lusitania (today Merida in Spain) the figure of Aion is inserted in a vast and very complex composition
- mosaic from Ammaedara in Proconsular Africa (now Haidra in Tunisia) we still see the god associated with the circle of the Zodiac and with the Seasons (albeit formulated in a different way);
- in Thysdrus (today el-Djem) are a series of unfinished busts: Aion in the centre, around (within circular medallions) the Four Seasons and the personifications of the Sun and the Moon;
- in Aphrodisias in Caria (today Geyre in Turkey) the god appears as a bearded old man, together with other divinities and personifications, in the relief dedicated to an illustrious citizen: Zoilos, friend of August. This senile figure means that here infinite Time is seen as extratemporal eternity, as infinity immovable and always equal to itself.

The other valuable polychrome mosaic with the central emblem of the god Ocean was found at the same time in an adjacent room but in poor condition and of which only a watercolour is preserved. In 1922 the large mosaic with marine monsters was removed and restored at the National Archaeological Museum of Ancona where it was damaged by bombing in 1943. The figures in black tesserae on a white background is made up of a rich series of fantastic beings all characterised by the rear part of the body ending in a fishtail with several coils, while the front part is the head of a newt or griffin or horse. The mosaic was studied and published by the then Superintendent G. Moretti who observed the stylistic inhomogeneity of the figures, some of which were notable such as the one with the forepart of a bull (unfortunately lost) and he attributed it both to several hands in the second half of the 2nd century AD, and to repairs at later times.

A complex of rooms with mosaic floors was also found in the insula del Pozzo in 1956, probably belonging to several structures, the most noteworthy of which is a polychrome one with geometric motifs laid out in a checkerboard pattern and edged with a fan motif, currently buried, but documented by a colour drawing from the time of discovery.

The so-called Marlborough gem, an exquisite cameo found here before 1572, is now in the Boston museum.

=== Public baths ===
The public baths (thermae) inside the walls are along the cardo B and date from the late Republican era and underwent several reconstructions to the beginning of the 3rd century AD. It had a large rectangular swimming pool surrounded by a peristyle. On the western side is a frigidarium with an apse decorated with polychrome marbles, and a tepidarium and along the southern and eastern sides a calidarium to catch the sun's heat.

The baths had a large figured mosaic, presently kept at the Museo Nazionale delle Marche. A 2nd-century coloured mosaic of Mithra-Sol is conserved in the Glyptothek, Munich; Mithraic bas-relief of animals representing the stages of the initiate's progress were reused in the Church of Santa Croce, and Mithraic inscriptions are recorded.

Outside the walls in the archaeological area near the church of S. Lucia along the main Roman road to the south are other monumental baths probably built within an extension of the town due to population growth and shortage of urban space. Out of an area of 7000 m^{2}, 3000 m^{2} were baths with a vestibulum (changing room), atrium, a large palaestra (exercise area) with peristyle, several apodyteria, frigidaria with pools, tepidaria and caldaria.

== See also ==
- Ancient Ostra
- Archaeological Park of Urbs Salvia
- Potentia (ancient city)
- Ricina
- Septempeda
- Suasa
