= Suasa =

Ancient Roman city

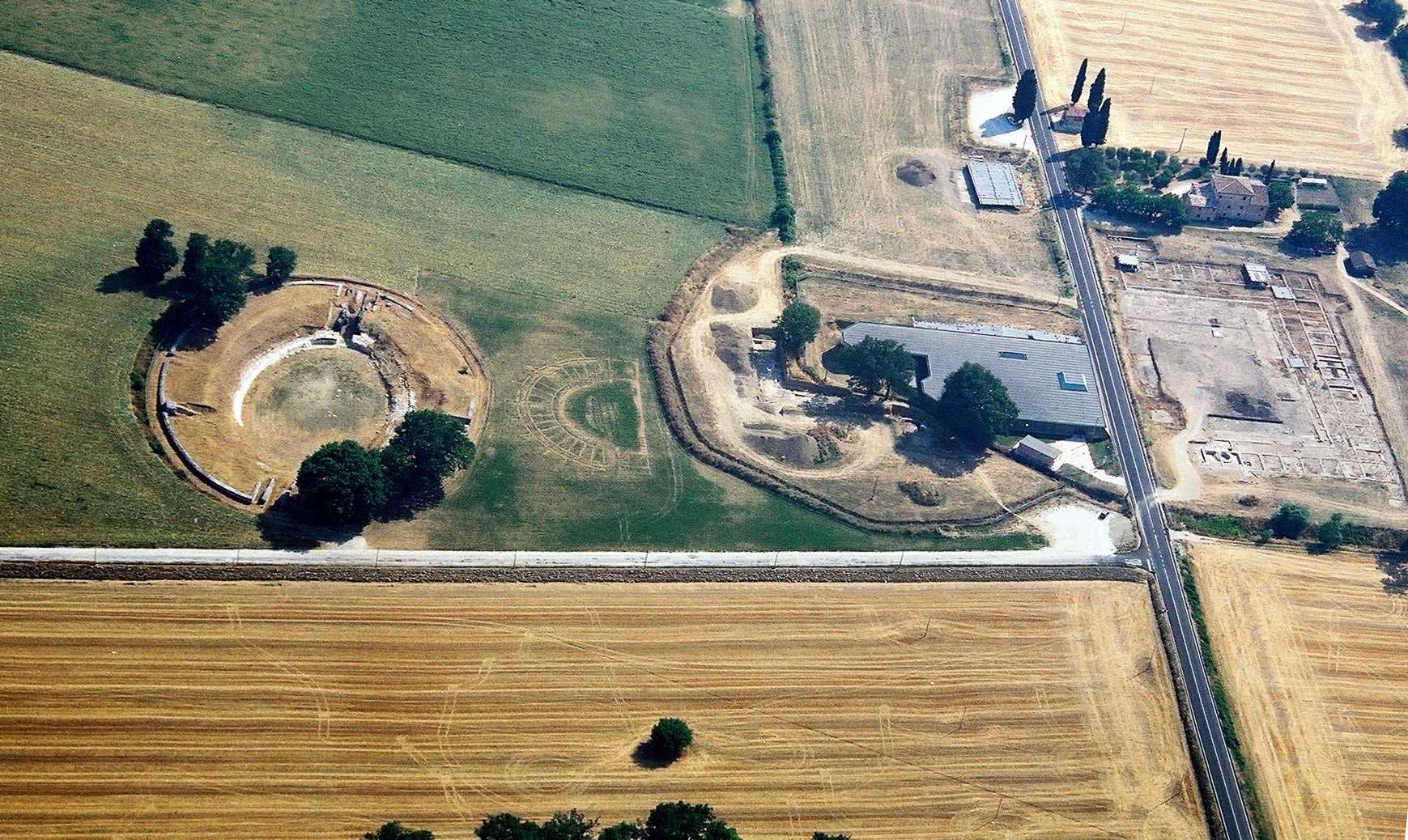
- Archaeological area of Suasa

- Location within Italy
- 43°37′28.92″N 12°59′12.12″E
- Type: Settlement
- Periods: Roman Republic - Byzantine Empire
- Cultures: Ancient Rome
- Location: Castelleone di Suasa, Province of Ancona, Marche, Italy

History
- Built: 3rd century BC
- Abandoned: 6th century

Site notes
- Website: Sito Archeologico di Suasa (in Italian)

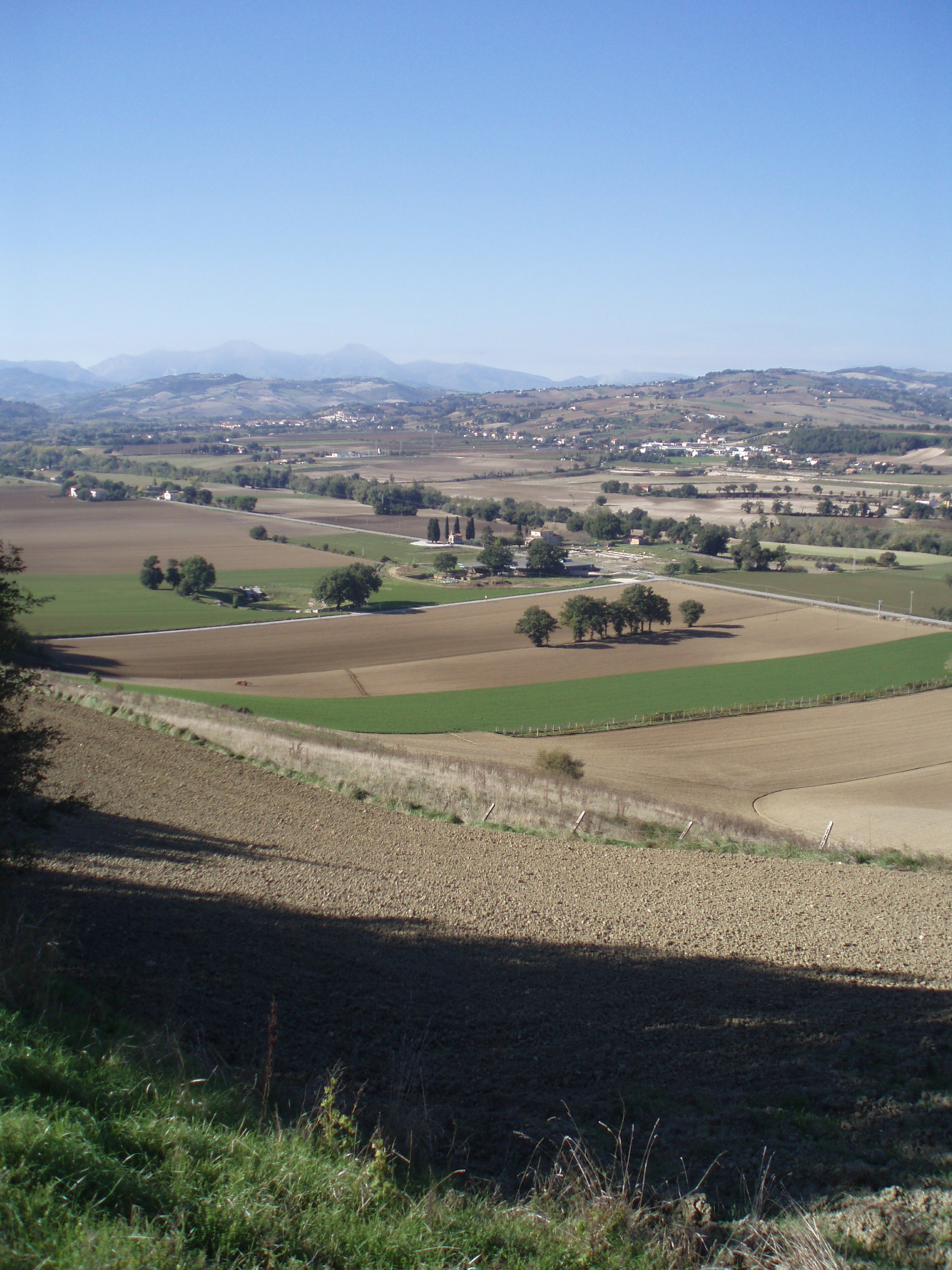
Archaeological area of Suasa. View from "Croce del Termine"

Suasa was an ancient Roman town in what is now the comune of Castelleone di Suasa, Marche, Italy. It is located in the Pian Volpello locality, in the valley of the Cesano River.

== History ==
Suasa was founded by the Romans in the early 3rd century BC after the Battle of Sentinum (295 BC), in a territory inhabited by the Senones. The town was crossed by a secondary branch of the Via Flaminia and by the Via Salaria Gallica, which connected it to Forum Sempronii (Fossombrone) and Ostra. In 232 BC, it became a prefecture and, in the 1st century BC, a municipium.

Suasa started to decline from the 3rd century; in 409, it was sacked by Alarich's Goths during his march against Rome (see Sack of Rome). It was abandoned in the 6th century after the Gothic War, the population moving to nearby settlements.

The remains have been excavated by the University of Bologna since 1987. The edifices found include:

- an amphitheater
- a theater
- the Coiedii domus
- a late-Republican era domus
- the cardo maximus
- a necropolis

== The Archaeological Park ==
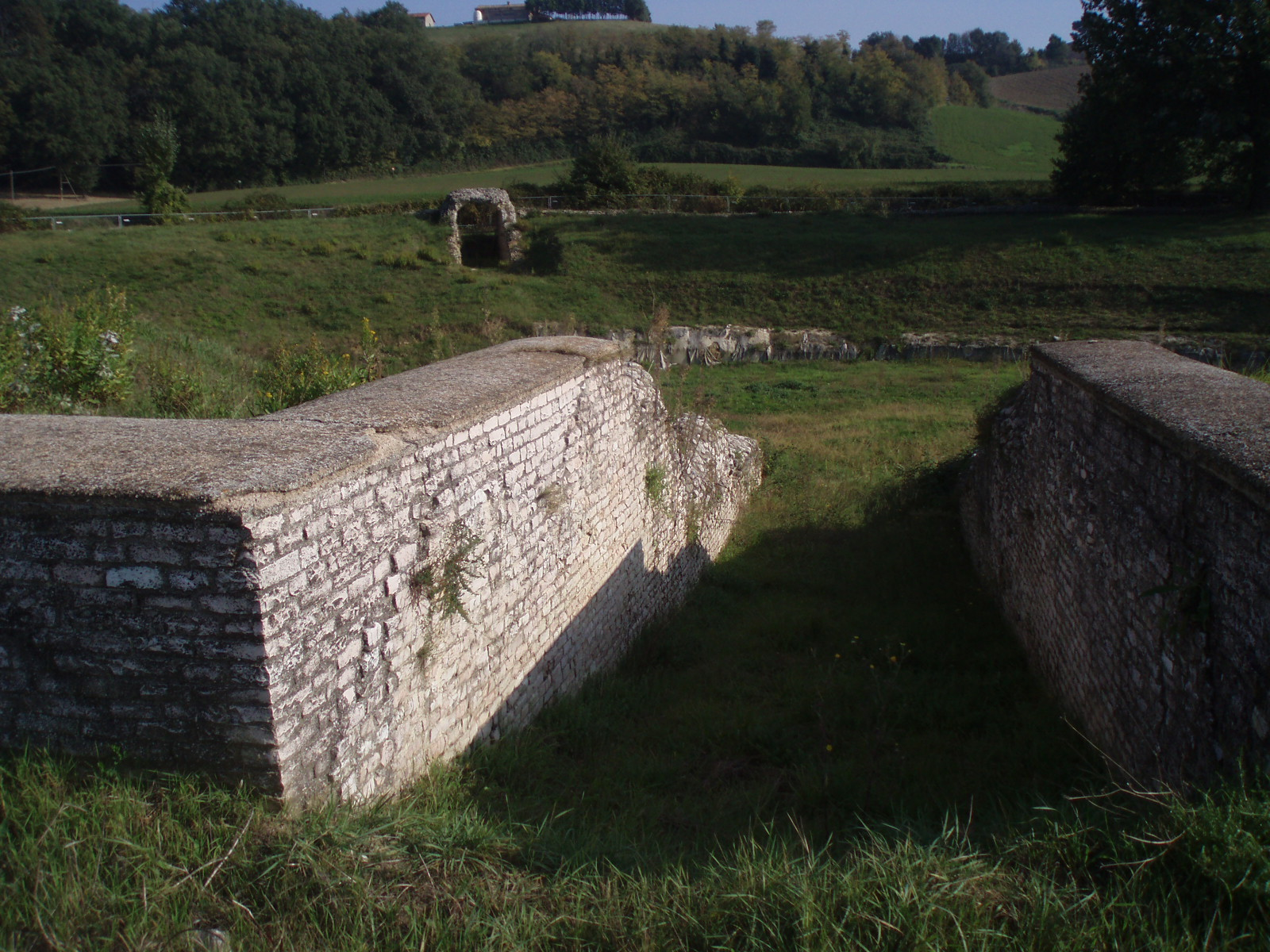
Entrance to Suasa amphitheater from a vomitorium.

The Suasa archaeological park is an archaeological site in Castelleone di Suasa (province of Ancona, Marche, Italy).

It includes the remains of the ancient town of Suasa, abandoned in the 6th century AD. The site comprises an open-air museum of a Roman house (the Coiedii domus), of great interest because of its size and architectonic complexity.

The domus was inhabited over a long period of time. Its development peaked in the 2nd century AD. The mosaics discovered in the interior are splendid and are the most important unitary complex of the Marches. Mythological, floral, and geometric scenes can be admired, but above all, a magnificent marble floor created with over fifteen different kinds of stone.

Part of the site is protected by a roof and a walkway allows visitors to explore it.

The large amphitheatre lies at the foot of the hill. During summer it hosts theatre shows.

== See also ==
- Ancient Ostra
- Archaeological Park of Urbs Salvia
- Potentia (ancient city)
- Ricina
- Sentinum
- Septempeda
