= Picenum =

Historical region of Italy; territory of the Roman Republic/Empire

Ethnolinguistic map of Italy in the Iron Age, before the Roman expansion and conquest of Italy

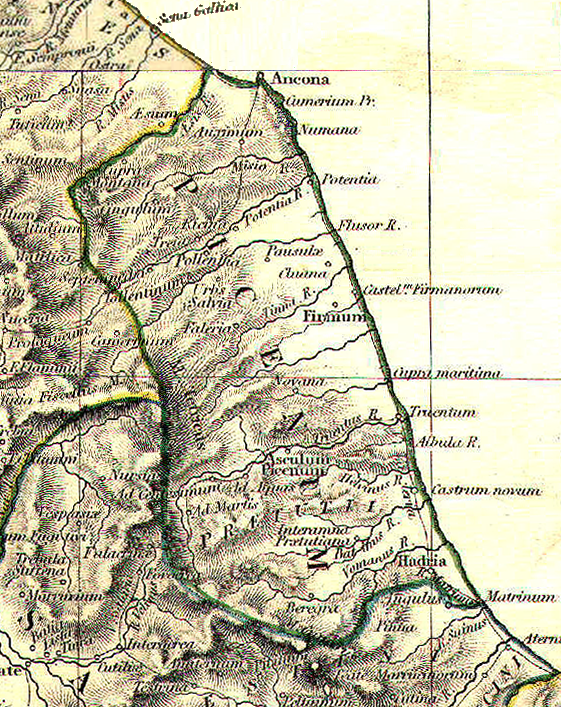
Augustus' Regio V – Picenum, from the 1911 Atlas of William R. Shepherd.

Picenum was a region of ancient Italy. The name was assigned by the Romans, who conquered and incorporated it into the Roman Republic. Picenum became Regio V in the Augustan territorial organisation of Roman Italy. It is now in Marche and the northern part of Abruzzo.

The Piceni or Picentes were the native population of Picenum, but they were not of uniform ethnicity. They maintained a sanctuary to the Sabine goddess Cupra in Cupra Marittima.

Picenum was also the birthplace of such Roman notables as Pompey the Great and his father, Pompeius Strabo.

== Historical geography ==
Picenum and the Picentes were described in some detail by the Roman geographers:

=== Strabo ===
Strabo places Picenum between the Apennines and the Adriatic Sea from the mouth of the Aesis River southward to Castrum at the mouth of the Truentinus River, some 800 stadia, which is 148 km (92 mi) using 185 m/stadion. For coastal cities he includes from north to south Ancona, Auxumum, Septempeda (San Severino Marche), Pneuentia, Potentia, Firmum Picenum with port at Castellum (Porto di Fermo), Cupra Maritima (Cupra Marittima and Grottammare), Truentum on the Truentinus (Tronto) and finally Castrum Novum and Matrinum on the Matrinus (Piomba), south of Silvi in Abruzzo. Strabo also mentions Adria (Atri, Italy) and Asculum Picenum (Ascoli Piceno) in the interior. The width of Picenum inland varies irregularly, he says.

== History ==
Picenum was first settled at the beginning of the Iron Age (1200 BC).

The Liburnians had colonies on the western Adriatic coast in Picenum from the beginning of the Iron Age and until the 6th century BC. Liburnian naval supremacy meant both political and economic authority in the Adriatic.

In 390 BC the Senoni Gauls invaded Italy from the north and occupied Picenum north of the Esino River. The archaeological evidence shows groups of Senones settled much further south of this river, in the Macerata area and even in the Ascoli area, in sites such as Filottrano, San Genesio, Matelica, and Offida. In 283 BC the Romans expelled the Senones and annexed Picenum down to Ancona when it became the Ager Gallicus, part of the Ager publicus (Roman state land).

In 268 BC the Romans defeated the Picentes after they had rebelled. Part of the population was deported, and others were given Roman citizenship without the right to vote. Thus, Picenum was annexed, except for the city of Asculum, which was considered an allied city. To keep it under control, the colony of Firmum was established nearby in 264 BC.

According to Polybius, during the consulship of Marcus Aemilius Lepidus (232 BC), "the Romans divided among their citizens the territory in Gaul known as Picenum, from which they had ejected the Senones when they conquered them".

Picenum sided with Rome against Hannibal during the Punic Wars. It also became a Roman base during the Social War. Some Picentes remained loyal to Rome in the war, while others fought against them for the right of Roman citizenship. All Picentes were granted full Roman citizenship after the war.

In the Edict of Diocletian, it was mentioned that the wine from Picenum was considered the most expensive wine, together with Falerno. Vinum Hadrianum was produced in Picenum, in the city of Hatria or Hadria, the old name of Atri. This is also the same wine that Pliny considered one of the highly rated wines, along with a few others.

== Culture ==
Excavations in Picenum have given much insight into the region during the Iron Age. Excavated tombs from the Molaroni and Servici cemeteries at the Novilara necropolis show that the Piceni laid bodies in the ground wrapped in garments they had worn in life.

Warriors were buried with a helmet, weapons, and vessels for food and drink. Buried beads, bone, fibulae and amber seem to demonstrate that there was an active trade in the ninth and perhaps tenth centuries BCE on the Adriatic coast, especially in amber and in beads of glass paste. In women’s graves there is a large abundance of ornaments made of bronze and iron.

Origins of these items may also show that the Piceni may have looked to the south and east for development.

The warrior tombs seem to show that the Piceni were a warlike people. Every man’s grave contained more or less a complete outfit of a warrior, with the most frequent weapon being a spear. Piceni swords appear to be imported from the Balkans.

== Languages ==
South Picene, written in an unusual version of the Italic alphabet, has been identified as a Sabellic language that is neither Oscan nor Umbrian.

The undeciphered North Picene, also written in a form of the Old Italic alphabet, is probably not closely unrelated to South Picene. At present, it is generally assumed not to be an Italic language (although it may have belonged to another branch of the Indo-European languages).

== Cities of the Regio V ==
As reported by Pliny the Elder in his Naturalis Historia, 24 cities were placed in Regio V:

Cities of Regio V
Latin Name	Modern Name	Modern Region	Tribù
Ancona	Ancona	Marche	Lemonia
Asculum	Ascoli Piceno	Marche	Fabia
Auximum	Osimo	Marche	Velina
Beregra	near Civitella del Tronto or Montorio al Vomano	Abruzzo	
Castrum Novum	near Giulianova	Abruzzo	Papiria
Castrum Truentinum	Martinsicuro	Abruzzo	
Cingulum	Cingoli	Marche	Velina
Cluana	Civitanova Marche	Marche	
Cupra Maritima	near Cupra Marittima (Grottammare)	Marche	Velina
Cupra Montana	near Sant'Eleuterio of Cupramontana	Marche	Velina
Falerio	near Falerone	Marche	Velina
Firmum Picenum	Fermo	Marche	Velina
Hadria	Atri	Abruzzo	Maecia
Interamnia	Teramo	Abruzzo	Velina
Novana	unknown, probably in the Aso valley	Marche	
Numana	Numana	Marche	
Pausulae	near San Claudio al Chienti, Corridonia	Marche	Velina
Planina	near San Vittore di Cingoli	Marche	Velina
Potentia	near Santa Maria a Potenza, Porto Recanati	Marche	Velina
Ricina	Villa Potenza, Macerata	Marche	Velina
Septempeda	San Severino Marche	Marche	Velina
Tolentinum	Tolentino	Marche	Velina
Trea	near Treia	Marche	Velina
Urbs Salvia	near Urbisaglia	Marche	Velina

== See also ==
- Ancient peoples of Italy

== Bibliography ==
- Federica Boschi, Enrico Giorgi, Frank Vermeulen, Picenum and the Ager Gallicus at the Dawn of the Roman Conquest, Landscape Archaeology and Material Culture, Archaeopress 2020 ISBN 978-1-78969-699-8
- Strabo. Geographica.
- Randall-MacIver, David (1927). The Iron Age in Italy. A Study of Those Aspects of the Early Civilizations Which Are Neither Villanovan or Etruscan. Oxford: Clarendon Press.
