= Ancient Ostra =

Ancient Roman town

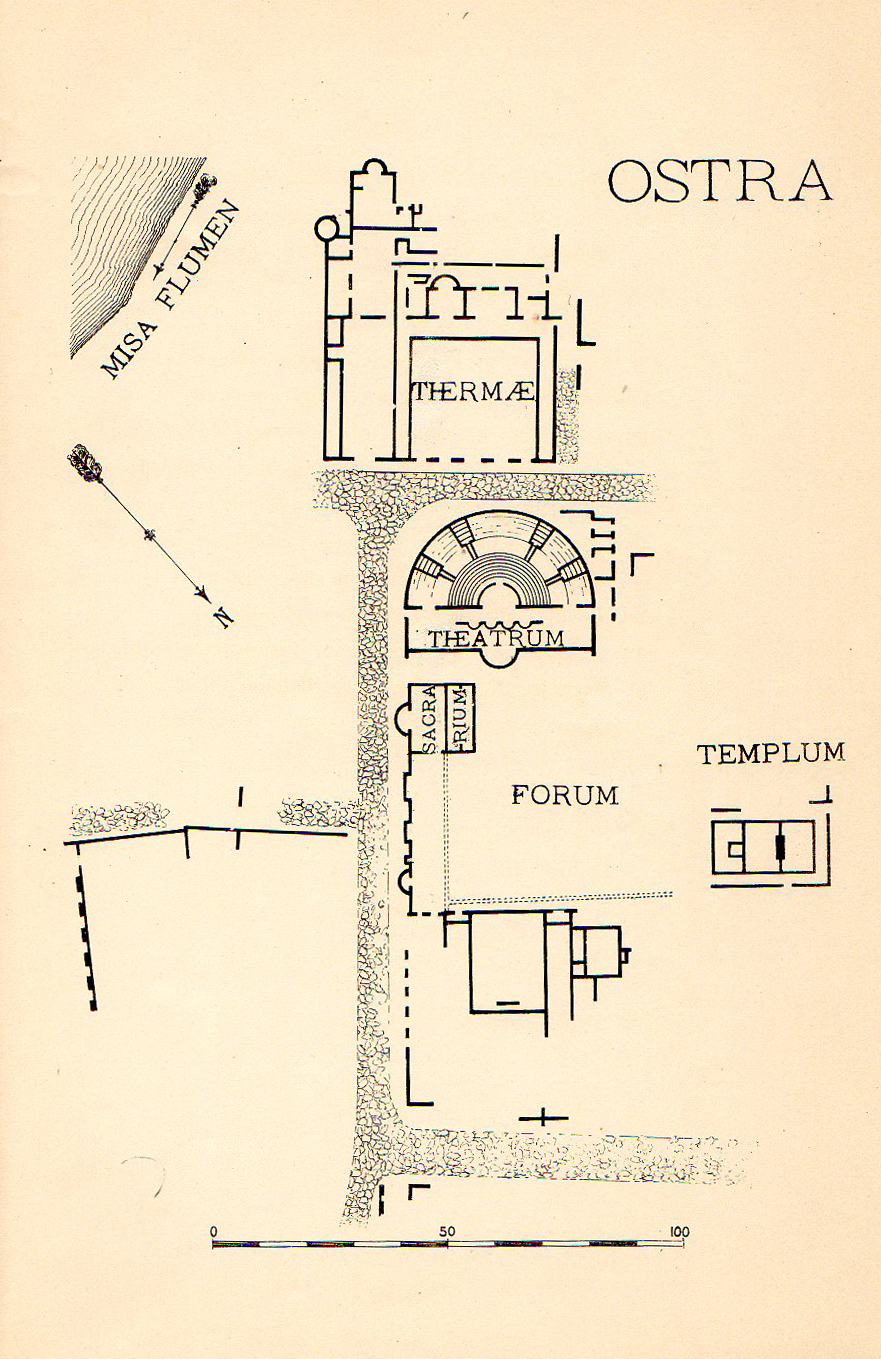
- Map of Ancient Ostra, drawn up during the excavations of 1903-1904 made by Cav. Baldoni.

- Location within Italy
- 43°35′5″N 13°5′10″E
- Type: Settlement
- Periods: Roman Republic - Byzantine Empire
- Cultures: Ancient Rome
- Location: Ostra Vetere, Province of Ancona, Marche, Italy

History
- Built: 3rd century BC
- Abandoned: 6th century

Site notes
- Website: Sito Archeologico di Ostra (in Italian)

Ostra was an ancient Roman town near the modern town of Ostra Vetere. The Roman town was inhabited from the 3rd century BC until the 6th century AD.

== History ==
Pliny the Elder mentions Ostra with another ancient town, Suasa, 8 kilometres (5 mi) west. Neither town survived beyond the classical period. Though Ostra is little mentioned by ancient authors, excavations there have brought to light remains of various buildings and several inscriptions.

== See also ==
- Archaeological Park of Urbs Salvia
- Potentia (ancient city)
- Ricina
- Sentinum
- Suasa
- Septempeda
