= Septempeda =

Ancient Roman town

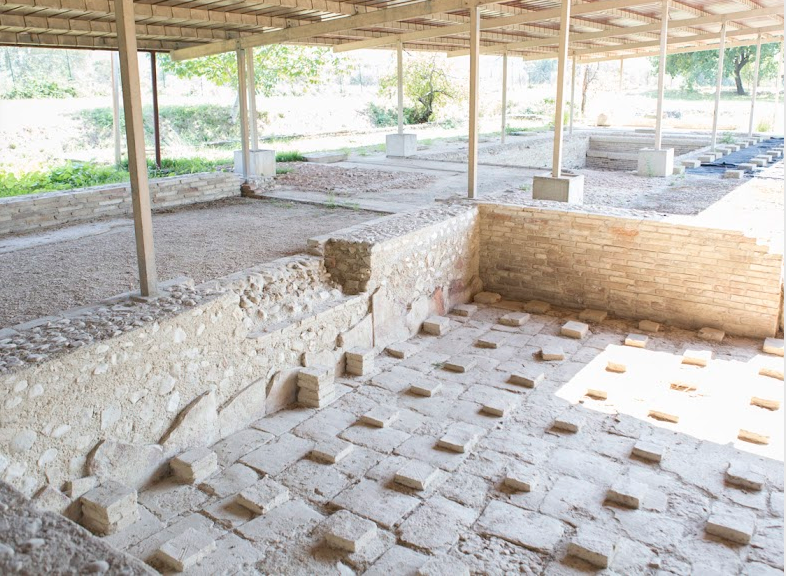
- Roman baths

- Location within Italy
- 43.23592°N 13.19611°E
- Type: Settlement
- Location: San Severino Marche, Province of Macerata, Marche, Italy

Septempeda was a Roman town in Picenum located near the modern San Severino Marche, Marche, Italy.

== Geography ==
The town was situated on the left bank of the river Flosis (modern River Potenza), some 40 km inland from the Adriatic coast and at the foot of the Apennines. During the early Middle Ages the name changed into San Severino Marche and the inhabitants moved to a more westerly location. The original urban site is now abandoned and mostly used as farmland.

== History ==
Its ancient origins, going back to the 3rd century BC with the Roman conquest of Picenum in 268 BC, are proven by early soldiers' family names on many Roman tombstones, such as the gentes Baebia, Calpurnia and Flavia. It is probable that Septempeda was earlier a focus and trade centre for the Picentes' hamlets in the neighbourhood.

Between the 3rd and 2nd centuries BC the conciliabulum and the possible praefectura were built. Around the mid-first century BC the settlement must have received municipium status. Inscriptions prove that Septempeda had a basilica and temples consecrated to Jupiter and Feronia outside of the walls.

After the Goths' raids in 545 AD Septempeda was abandoned and its inhabitants found refuge in the safer top of Monte Nero, a few kilometres west and on the opposite side of the River Potenza.

After the barbarian incursions, the remains of Severino, last bishop of Septempeda (540-545) were recovered and moved in 590 to Monte Nero. A legend of the Longobard age associated to the transfer of Severino, is believed to demonstrate the existence of a veneration for the Saint, which received a written confirmation from a document of 944 by Bishop Eudo, about the building of a church in Castello qui dicitur ad Sancto Severinum. This testifies the existence of a new toponym in the place of Septempeda that was soon named Castellum Sancti Severini and then simply Sanseverino.

== Origins of name ==
The origin of the name has been subject of speculations. The number seven (Latin: septem) is recurrent in the ancient and medieval town: seven Roman arms width of Septempeda's walls, seven gates of the Sanseverino walls, the Fountain of Seven Taps in the Castle of Sanseverino, seventy-seven arches of the arcade facing the main square of Sanseverino, seven younger brothers of Severino Bishops' that were hurled in seven hills to suffer and become saints because of a malediction delivered by their mother, or seven hamlets that aggregated themselves to form Septempeda. None of these explanations has been confirmed, while the best tradition claims the Roman name of Septempeda to derive from the seven hills surrounding the town, in a proud appeal to the seven hills of the Eternal City.

== Research ==
During the past centuries many finds have been brought to light. The most important structural discoveries were during the excavations in the second half of the 20th century of two city gates, a Roman bath house and parts of Roman houses. The walls in opus quadratum encircle a higher, hilly area north of the Roman valley road and a lower area slightly sloping towards the Potenza river. Almost centrally located are large baths consisting of a courtyard, a portico, a pool, a caldarium and other rooms with heated flooring, of which many were originally paved with mosaics. To the west of city wall and north of the main road was unearthed a cluster of kilns for the production of tiles and pottery. Directly outside the town wall, the main road was lined with a rich array of funeral monuments revealing information about the town’s inhabitants.

Recent archaeological surveys since 2004 by the Potenza Valley Survey Project, of Ghent University have resulted a detailed map of the orthogonal street grid and the main decumanus maximus. The perimeter resembles a pentagonal plan and measures some 15 ha within the walls (intra muros). Along the main decumanus, which coincides with the modern valley road, the forum can be distinguished which measures 59 x 33 m and is surrounded by a series of public buildings and monuments.

== The Remains ==
The foundations of the walls and the remains of the eastern and south-western gates of Septempeda, located in "La Pieve", east of the present-day town, can be seen together with a baths building, probably near the forum.

Outside the town walls remains of a furnace for the production of pottery, a private domus with mosaics and cemetery areas with tombs from the 1st and 2nd centuries AD have been excavated.

The cathedral of Santa Maria in Septempeda was probably built in Late Roman times and there, according to tradition, Bishop Severino was buried and hidden to protect his remains from barbarians. Of original Romanesque style is the apse and the right hand nave. It was rebuilt in the 13th century in Gothic-Lombard style and displays some extant frescoes. It has been restored and can be visited, being located next to the ancient town walls.

Santa Maria in Septempeda and San Severino Castle in the background

== See also ==
- Ancient Ostra
- Archaeological Park of Urbs Salvia
- Potentia (ancient city)
- Ricina
- Sentinum
- Suasa

== Sources ==
- A. Gubinelli, (1975) San Severino Marche, Guida Storica Artistica, EDC ed.
- M. Landolfi, (2003) Il Museo Civico Archeologico di San Severino Marche, San Severino Marche.
- F. Vermeulen (2012), "Topografia e processi evolutivi delle città romane della valle del Potenza (Picenum)." In: de Marinis, G., Fabrini, G.M., Paci, G., Perna, R. & Silvestrini, M. (eds.), I processi formativi ed evolutivi della città in area adriatica, BAR International Series S 2419, Oxford, pp. 331–344.
