= Treia =

- Comune
- Comune di Treia
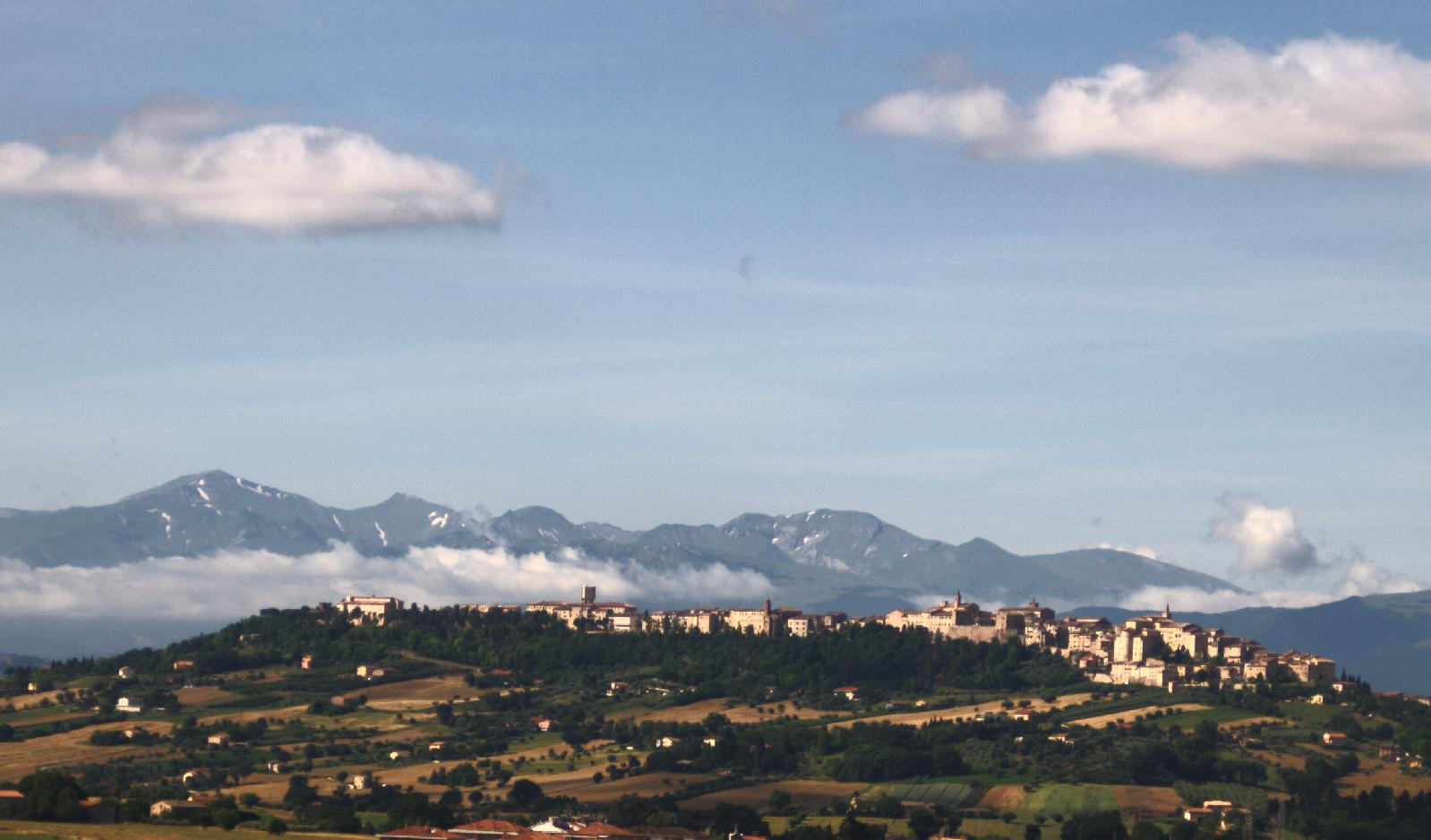

- Coat of arms

- Location within Italy Location within Marche
- Coordinates: 43°18′40″N 13°18′45″E
- Country: Italy
- Region: Marche
- Province: Macerata (MC)
- Frazioni: Passo di Treia, Chiesanuova di Treia, Santa Maria in Selva, Camporota

Government
  - Mayor: Edy Castellani

Area
  - Total: 93 km^{2} (36 sq mi)
- Elevation: 342 m (1,122 ft)

Population (31 December 2015)
  - Total: 9,404
  - Density: 100/km^{2} (260/sq mi)
- Demonym: Treiesi
- Time zone: UTC+1 (CET)
  - Summer (DST): UTC+2 (CEST)
- Postal code: 62010
- Dialing code: 0733
- Patron saint: St. Patrick
- Saint day: March 17
- Website: Official website

Treia is a town and comune in the province of Macerata in the central Marche (Italy). It is 7 kilometres (4.3 mi) north of Pollenza, 12 kilometres (7.5 mi) west of Macerata, and 18 kilometres (11 mi) north-northeast of Tolentino.

== Geography ==
The site of the abandoned Roman municipium of Trea is situated in the middle valley of the River Potenza, some 30 km from the Adriatic shore. The town was located on a dominant plateau, 1 km north-west of present-day Treia, and just 3 km east of Monte Pitino, in an agrarian area around the church and convent of SS. Crocifisso.

== Remains ==
The only remaining visible ruins are two small sections of the former city walls, partly incorporated in a now abandoned farm house. Since the 16th century many isolated finds as well as epigraphic monuments concerning Trea have been discovered in the general area. The first major excavations by Fortunato Benigni in the late 18th century determined the town’s approximate location and revealed parts of its walls, a basilica and a sanctuary with possible thermal building, located under the convent of SS. Crocifisso.

== History ==
Treia is said to have been founded by the Sabine people in 380 BCE. Although the precise origin of the site remains unknown, its location on an elevated plateau near the Picene hilltop site of Monte Pitino could indicate that it was already a pre-Roman center. It became a Roman municipium shortly after 49 BC and it is possible that its circuit wall was erected around that time.

The Roman town flourished between the reigns of Augustus and Antoninus Pius, as indicated by the large collection of funerary monuments, statuary and epigraphic evidence.

Large Egyptian religious statues of the Roman period have been found and are kept in the town's museum: they are unique in the Marche.

The later phases of Trea are less well documented and the last epigraphic evidence dates from the 4th century AD. However, according to some archaeological finds from early excavations and surveys, later habitation in Trea, at least until the 7th century AD, can be assumed.

It is imaginable that during the Early Middle Ages the remaining habitation was restructured in connection with a modest early Christian sanctuary for the plebs, here to be located at the site of SS. Crocifisso. Although this sanctuary is only found in documents from the mid-12th century onwards, many early medieval spolia used in the later church of SS. Crocifisso indicate the presence of a much earlier phase. Around AD 1000 the population probably moved towards the more easily defensible hill-site of Montecchio (later called Treia) and the original town site remained practically deserted.

The town sided with the Pope in the temporal struggles of central Italy, and was besieged several times, and in particular in 1239 by Enzio, son and vicar of Frederick II and again in 1263 by Conrad of Antioch, who was captured at the nearby battle of Vallesacco, and held for several months in town in a small prison (now in use as a caffé).

Montecchio eventually became part of the Papal States, and in 1790 Pope Pius VI rewarded it for its faithfulness by raising it to the official rank of "city", at the same time renaming it by its Roman name of Treia.

Treia's most famous native was the archaeologist and art critic Luigi Lanzi.

== Archaeology ==
From 2000 onwards the Potenza Valley Survey Project, a project of Ghent University directed by Frank Vermeulen, attempts to map all buried structures of the ancient town. The survey methodology involves a series of aerial photography operations, large-scale geophysical prospections and intensive artefact surveys and studies. Due to all this new information it is now possible to map most parts of the town’s infrastructure in detail.

Roman Trea was situated along an important byroad of the via Flaminia, which connected Rome directly to the harbour city Ancona, via most of the Potenza Valley. Around this road a street-side settlement developed gradually into a real town during the Late Republic. The town wall delimiting the main urban area has an irregular oval shape, which agrees well with the general topographic configuration of the hilly plateau. The total enclosed area is only about 11 ha but possibly extramural habitation areas existed, particularly on the eastern and western sides. The street grid, individuating insulae of different size, is organized parallel with and perpendicular to a central decumanus maximus. Centrally the main road is interrupted by the monumental forum complex. The open rectangular square, is bordered by porticoes, tabernae and a series of public buildings. Centrally on the eastern side stood a rectangular building identified as the main podium temple. On and near the short west side of the forum stood a basilica, and possibly a curia. The planned forum was probably constructed in late Republican and early Imperial times. The remnants of another temple, discovered under the bell tower of the sanctuary of SS. Crocifisso and partly excavated by the University of Macerata in the 1980s, can be considered as an Egyptian sanctuary for Isis and Serapis. The discovery of a marble head of Serapis and a number of smaller Egyptian statuettes, as well as the second century AD inscription that mentions the temple of the “Domina” (the goddess Isis), can lead to the interpretation that this foreign cult was practiced here.

== Main sights ==
=== Religious buildings ===
- Treia Cathedral (SS. Annunziata): medieval brick Duomo
- Santuario del SS. Crocefisso: a large early 20th‑century church complex
- San Filippo Neri: Baroque church
- Santa Chiara: late-Baroque/early-Neoclassic church
- San Michele
- San Francesco
- San Lorenzo
- Santa Maria del Suffragio
- Monastero della Visitazione

=== Secular buildings ===
- Palazzo Municipale: 17th‑century Town Hall (includes a collection of Renaissance and classical paintings that may be visited on request
- Villa Spada or Villa "La Quiete": work of the neoclassical architect Giuseppe Valadier (now in ruins)
- Museum of the town's history, inaugurated in 2004.
- Georgic Academy
- Archaeological Museum
- Municipal Theatre
