= List of railway stations in Marche =

This is the list of the railway stations in Marche owned by Rete Ferroviaria Italiana, a branch of the Italian state company Ferrovie dello Stato.

== List ==
Station	Locality	Province	Category
Albacina	Albacina	Ancona	Bronze
Ancona	Ancona	Ancona	Gold
Ancona Marittima	Ancona	Ancona	Silver
Ancona Torrette	Ancona	Ancona	Silver
Ascoli Piceno	Ascoli Piceno	Ascoli Piceno	Silver
Bellisio Solfare	Bellisio Solfare	Ancona	Bronze
Castelferretti	Castelferretti	Ancona	Bronze
Castelplanio-Cupramontana	Castelplanio	Ancona	Bronze
Castelraimondo-Camerino	Castelraimondo	Macerata	Silver
Cerreto d'Esi	Cerreto d'Esi	Ancona	Bronze
Chiaravalle	Chiaravalle	Ancona	Silver
Civitanova Marche-Montegranaro	Civitanova Marche	Macerata	Silver
Corridonia-Mogliano	Corridonia	Macerata	Bronze
Cupramarittima	Cupra Marittima	Ascoli Piceno	Bronze
Fabriano	Fabriano	Ancona	Silver
Fabriano-Ca' Maiano	Fabriano	Ancona	Bronze
Falconara Marittima	Falconara Marittima	Ancona	Silver
Falconara Stadio	Falconara Marittima	Ancona	Bronze
Fano	Fano	Pesaro and Urbino	Silver
Gagliole	Gagliole	Macerata	Bronze
Genga-San Vittore Terme	Genga	Ancona	Bronze
Grottammare	Grottammare	Ascoli Piceno	Bronze
Jesi	Jesi	Ancona	Silver
Loreto	Loreto	Ancona	Silver
Macerata	Macerata	Macerata	Silver
Macerata Fontescodella	Macerata	Macerata	Bronze
Maltignano del Tronto	Maltignano del Tronto	Ascoli Piceno	Bronze
Marino del Tronto-Folignato	Marino del Tronto	Ascoli Piceno	Bronze
Marotta-Mondolfo	Mondolfo	Pesaro and Urbino	Silver
Marzocca	Marzocca	Ancona	Bronze
Matelica	Matelica	Macerata	Bronze
Melano-Marischio	Melano	Ancona	Bronze
Monsampolo del Tronto	Monsampolo del Tronto	Ascoli Piceno	Bronze
Montecarotto-Castelbellino	Montecarotto	Ancona	Bronze
Montecosaro	Montecosaro	Macerata	Bronze
Montemarciano	Montemarciano	Ancona	Bronze
Monteprandone	Monteprandone	Ascoli Piceno	Bronze
Monterosso Marche	Monterosso Marche	Ancona	Bronze
Morrovalle-Monte San Giusto	Morrovalle	Macerata	Bronze
Offida-Castel di Lama	Offida	Ascoli Piceno	Bronze
Osimo-Castelfidardo	Osimo	Ancona	Bronze
Palombina	Ancona	Ancona	Bronze
Pantiere di Castelbellino	Castelbellino	Ancona	Bronze
Pedaso	Pedaso	Fermo	Bronze
Pergola	Pergola	Pesaro and Urbino	Bronze
Pesaro	Pesaro	Pesaro and Urbino	Gold
Pollenza	Pollenza	Macerata	Bronze
Porto d'Ascoli	Porto d'Ascoli	Ascoli Piceno	Silver
Porto Recanati	Porto Recanati	Macerata	Silver
Porto Sant'Elpidio	Porto Sant'Elpidio	Fermo	Silver
Porto San Giorgio-Fermo	Porto San Giorgio	Fermo	Silver
Potenza Picena-Montelupone	Potenza Picena	Macerata	Bronze
S.Benedetto del Tronto	San Benedetto del Tronto	Ascoli Piceno	Silver
San Claudio	San Claudio	Macerata	Bronze
San Filippo	Ascoli Piceno	Ascoli Piceno	Bronze
San Severino Marche	San Severino Marche	Macerata	Silver
Sassoferrato-Arcevia	Sassoferrato	Ancona	Bronze
Senigallia	Senigallia	Ancona	Silver
Serra San Quirico	Serra San Quirico	Ancona	Bronze
Spinetoli-Colli	Spinetoli	Ascoli Piceno	Bronze
Tolentino	Tolentino	Macerata	Silver
Urbisaglia-Sforzacosta	Urbisaglia	Macerata	Bronze
Varano	Ancona	Ancona	Bronze

== See also ==
- Railway stations in Italy
- Ferrovie dello Stato
- Rail transport in Italy
- High-speed rail in Italy
- Transport in Italy
