= Marco Attura =

Italian musical artist

- Born: 13 November 1985 (age 40); Anagni, Italy
- Origin: Acuto, Italy
- Genres: Classical music
- Occupations: Composer, conductor, pianist
- Instrument: piano
- Years active: 2005–present
- Labels: Universal Edition, Casa Musicale Sonzogno
- Website: www.marcoattura.com

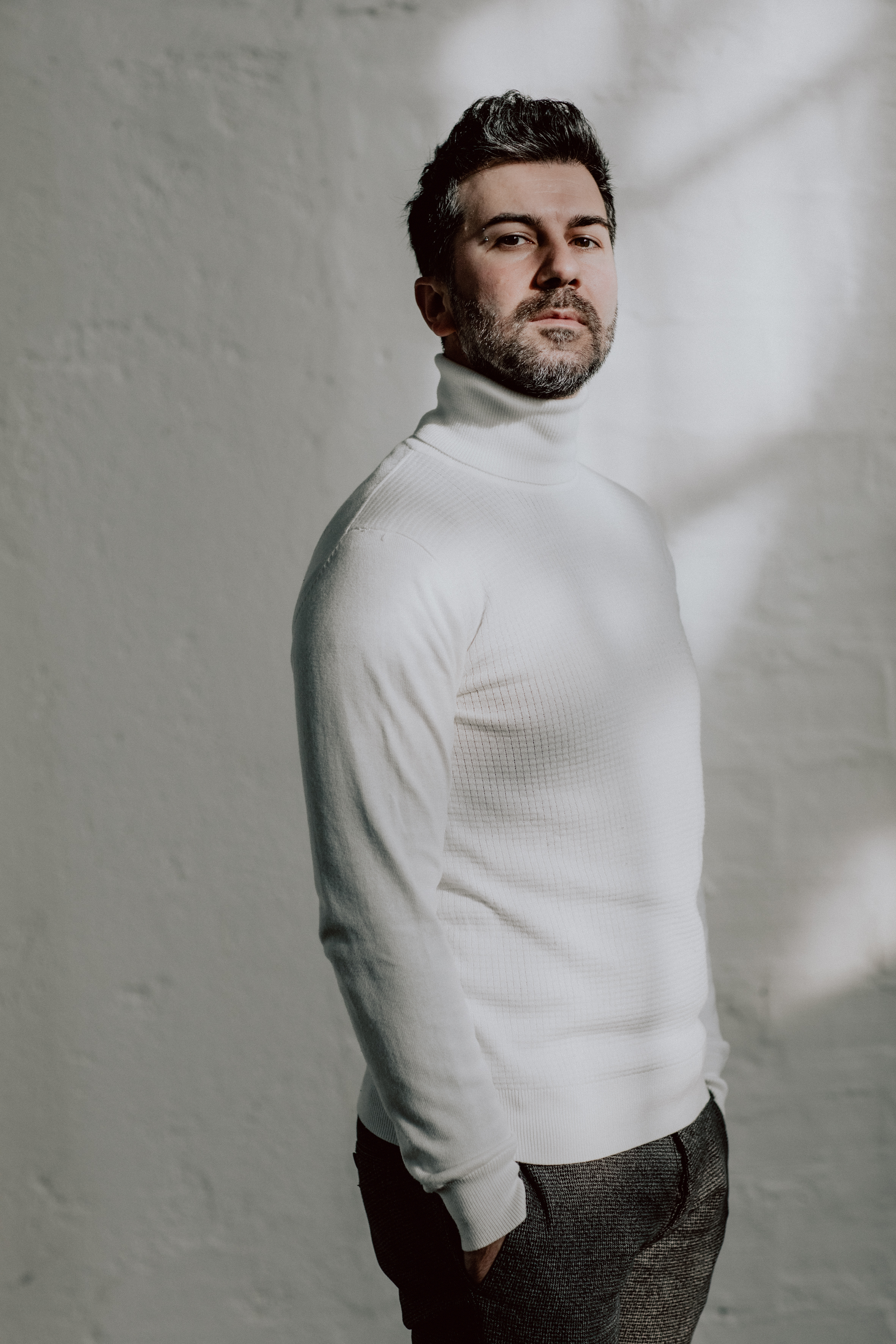
Marco Attura

Marco Attura is an Italian composer, pianist and conductor.

== Biography ==
He obtained diplomas in piano, composition, choral music and orchestral conducting (cum laude). He furthered his studies at the Royal Philharmonic Academy of Bologna, Städtische Bühnen in Münster, Germany, the Teatro Lirico Sperimentale in Spoleto and the Academy of Teatro alla Scala in Milan, where most of Italy's greatest operatic artists, and many of the finest singers from around the world, have studied and performed.

He follows the masterclasses with Daniel Oren, and Jorma Panula.

At the age of twenty, he made his debut on the podium of the Teatro degli Industri with Puccini's opera "Gianni Schicchi" and later with Wolfgang Amadeus Mozart's "Don Giovanni". On the occasion of the X edition of the "Giuseppe Sciacca" International Prize for young scholars, he was awarded the 1st Prize at the Pontifical Urbaniana University in Rome.

He substitutes at the Teatro Lirico Sperimentale "A.Belli" in Spoleto where he also worked as a pianist and conductor. In masterclasses of vocal technique, lyric and baroque singing, he supports important singers, including Claudio Desderi, Renato Bruson, Giovanna Casolla, Marina Comparato, Lella Cuberli and Mario Antonio Diaz Varas, dean of the University of Mozarteum in Salzburg, Austria. He was assistant to Muhai Tang for the first performance in Chinese of the opera "Marco Polo" by Enjott Schneider staged at the Teatro Carlo Felice in Genoa for the opening of the 2019 season.

His compositions are published by the Casa Musicale Sonzogno and Universal Edition, performed in music reviews and seminars, at the Auditorium Parco della Musica in Rome and at the World Music Competition in Kerkrade, Netherlands.

He curates for the Curci Music Editions the Italian version of Mario's Cantafavola "Aucassin and Nicolette".

His collaborations include the Orchestra di Padova e del Veneto and I Solisti Aquilani, Orchestra Filarmonica di Benevento, and Nuova Orchestra Scarlatti di Napoli with which he conducted Maestro Bruno Canino in Mozart's K488 Piano Concerto. He conducted "Samson et Dalila" by Camille Saint-Saëns at National Theatre of Opera and Ballet, performed for the first time in Albania.

He records for Warner Classics, Da Vinci Classics (first world premiere of Pietro Mascagni's satanic rhapsody), piano version by the author, Brilliant Classics, Tactus and Amadeus Arte.

He is a teacher of Score Reading at the Italian Conservatories of Music and carries out conducting activities with one particular predilection for the opera repertoire, from the 1900s and at the same time, with more than 50 premieres.

== Works ==
1. Cops for ensemble (Commissione Fondazione Pergolesi Spontini di Jesi)
2. Asylum Ballet Music, for ensemble
3. Argo, for Baritone and Orchestra
4. Cantilena ed oblìo di un luogo estraneo e mai vissuto, for guitar and piano
5. Per aspera ad Astra ("Over the thorns to the stars"), for two pianos and percussion
6. ... ad Astra (World Music Contest Kerkrade 2023), for Symphonic wind band
7. Imago Matris, for flute and strings orchestra
8. Victimae Paschali Laudes, for SATB choir and organ
9. Avalon, for wind ensemble (Commissione Ente Musicale e culturale “G.Puccini” di Suvereto)
10. Il Lato nascosto Opera (Commissione Fondazione Pergolesi Spontini di Jesi)

== Performances ==
- "Sacro Incanto" Festival, position: directed Labirinto Vocale ensemble,
- National Theater of Opera and Ballet(Albania), Opera "Samson et Dalila", position: orchestral direction,
- Teatro Pergolesi, opera "Delitto to the island of Capre", position: conductor,
- Teatro Brancaccio, opera "Seven brides for seven brothers", position: conductor,
- Teatro Pergolesi, opera "Night for me bright", position: conductor,
- Teatro Pergolesi, opera "The hidden side. Circopera lunar ", position: conductor
- Teatro Pergolesi 19th Pergolese-Spontini Festival 2019, "Aucassin et Nicolette", role: realization of the Italian version,
- Teatro Pergolesi, opera "Cryss on the island of goats", role: directing,

== Discography ==
- Universal Edition – Marco Attura,
- Personal web-site discography,
- AllMusic – Marco Attura.
