= Pergolesi Spontini Foundation =

Italian organisation to promote the composers Pergolesi and Spontini

The Pergolesi Spontini Foundation was established in Jesi in 2000, by the Marche Region, the Province of Ancona, the Municipality of Jesi and the Municipality of Maiolati Spontini. The municipalities of Montecarotto, Monte San Vito, Monsano, San Marcello are associated members. The Chamber of Commerce of Ancona entered as Contributing Participant. A group of private companies supports the Foundation.

Since 2009, the Foundation has been the recipient of the quality certification by the TÜV company.

== Aims ==
The Pergolesi Spontini Foundation aims to strengthen the reputation and prestige of the two composers Giovanni Battista Pergolesi (Jesi, 1710 – Pozzuoli, 1736) and Gaspare Spontini (Maiolati Spontini, 1774–1851) collecting, sorting and cataloguing their sources and making their works better known by working in collaboration with other national and international institutions.

== Activities ==
=== Opera productions ===
The Foundation's opera productions take advantage of a double contribution from the Fund for the Performing Arts from Italian Ministero per i Beni e le Attività Culturali, for Festival Pergolesi Spontini and the traditional opera season at the Pergolesi Theatre in Jesi.

=== Festival Pergolesi Spontini ===
The Festival Pergolesi Spontini was born in 2001 as an international festival dedicated to the promotion of the works of Pergolesi and Spontini, which are performed with original instruments, after studying the sources and approaching various executive and stylistic issues according to scientific criteria.

Every year the Festival proposes a subject linking together Pergolesi and Spontini and other composers. It is held in Jesi and in other cities of the province of Ancona.

=== Traditional opera season of G.B. Pergolesi Theatre ===
The Foundation has managed the Pergolesi theatre and its traditional opera season since 2005. Since 1968, the theatre has been qualified as a "theatre of tradition". The opera season takes place in September to December time-period.

=== Music publishing ===
The Foundation relies on musicologists for the review of the works of both composers and conducts research and studies through the action of its study committees.

=== Management of the theatres ===
The Foundation manages six theatres in the province of Ancona. These are the "G.B. Pergolesi Theatre" and the "Valeria Moriconi Theatre" in Jesi; the "Gaspare Spontini theatre" in Maiolati Spontini; the "City theatre" in Montecarotto; the "P. Ferrari theatre" in San Marcello; and the "La Fortuna Theatre" in Monte San Vito.

== See also ==
- Teatro G.B. Pergolesi
