= Macerata railway station =

Railway station in Italy

Macerata
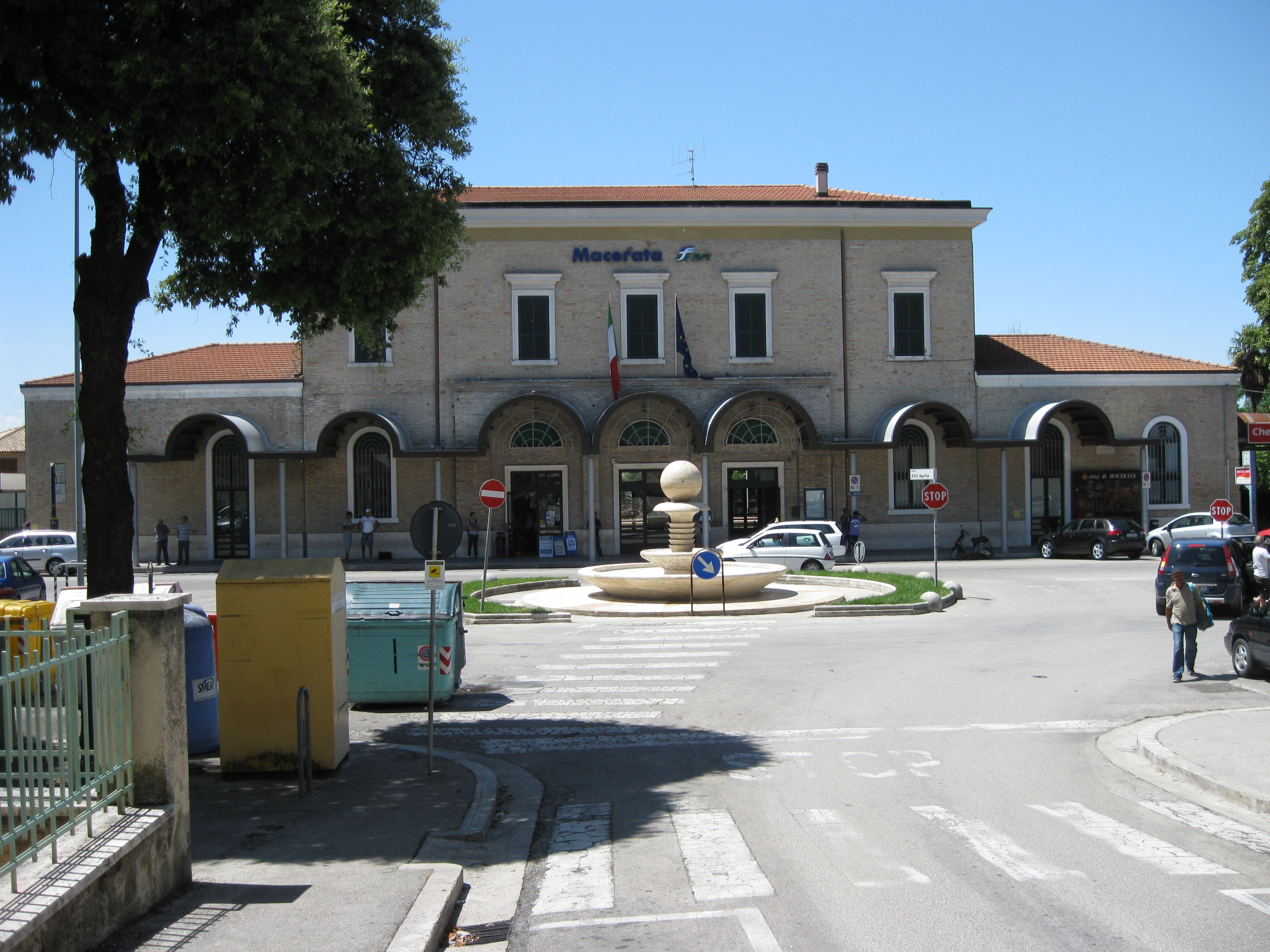
- The station building

General information
- Location: Piazza XXX Aprile; 62100 Macerata MC; Macerata, Macerata, Marche; Italy
- Coordinates: 43°17′37″N 13°27′18″E
- Elevation: 258 m (846 ft)
- Operator: Rete Ferroviaria Italiana; Centostazioni
- Line: Civitanova–Fabriano
- Distance: 27.182 km (16.890 mi) from Civitanova Marche-Montegranaro
- Train operators: Trenitalia
- Connections: Urban and suburban buses

Other information
- Classification: Silver

History
- Opened: 22 May 1886; 140 years ago
Location
- Location within Marche Location within Italy

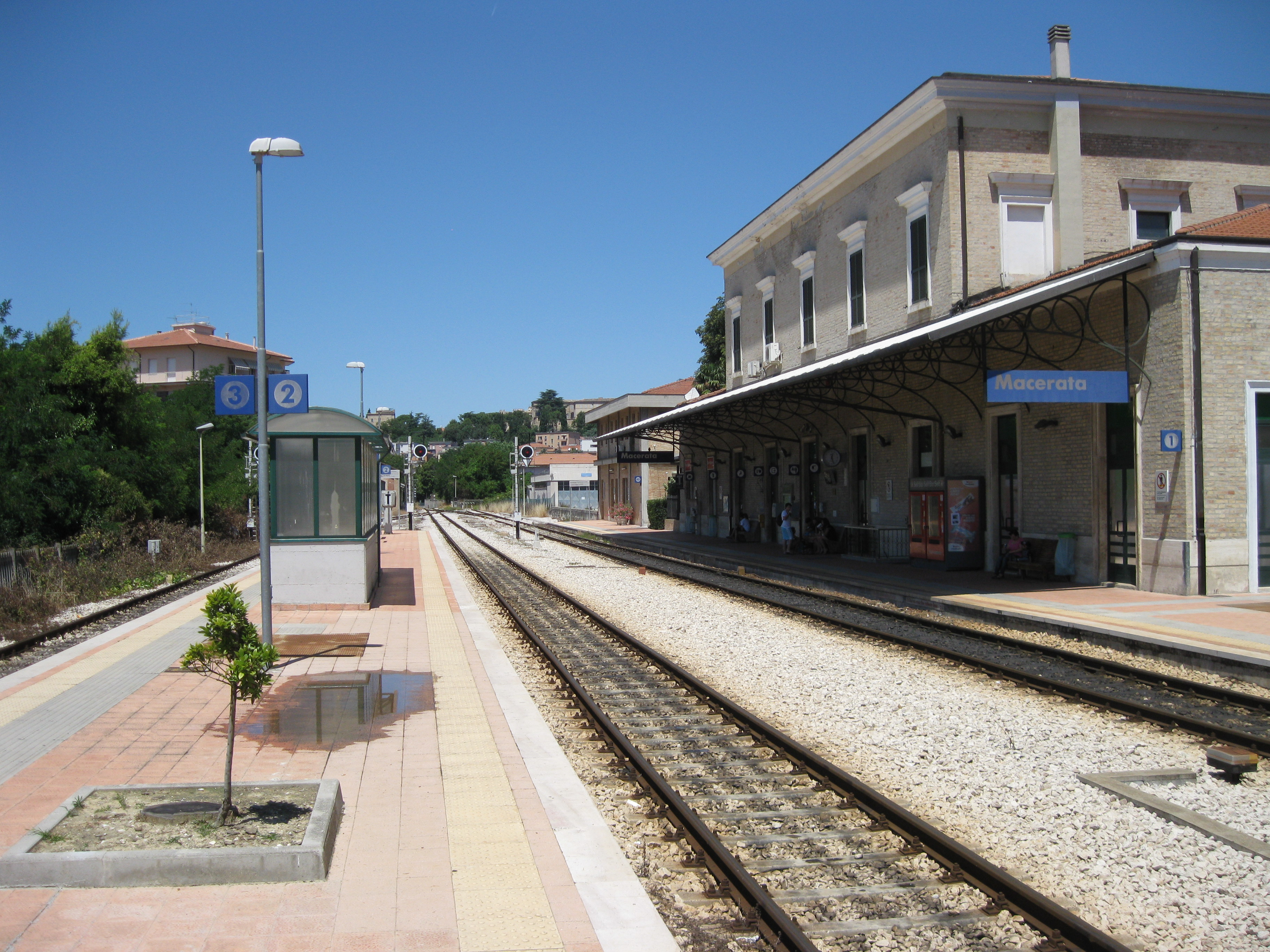
Station platforms

Macerata railway station (Italian: Stazione di Macerata) serves the city and comune of Macerata, in the region of Marche, central Italy. Opened in 1886, it forms part of the Civitanova–Fabriano railway.

The station is currently managed by Rete Ferroviaria Italiana (RFI). However, the commercial area of the passenger building is managed by Centostazioni. Train services are operated by Trenitalia. Each of these companies is a subsidiary of Ferrovie dello Stato (FS), Italy's state-owned rail company.

== Location ==
Macerata railway station is situated at Piazza XXX Aprile, to the south of the city centre.

== History ==
The station was opened on 22 May 1886, upon the inauguration of the Corridonia–Macerata section of the Civitanova–Fabriano railway.

On 24 December 1888, the station became a through station, when the final section of the Civitanova–Fabriano railway was completed, between Macerata and San Severino Marche.

== Features ==
=== Passenger Building ===
Macerata's passenger building is a two-storey structure, made up of three sections. The ground floor of the central section houses services for passengers, such as the ticket office and waiting room. The first floor is not accessible to the public. Extending laterally from the central section are two symmetrical single storey wings, with facilities including a bar and a newsstand.

The station was recently renovated at a total cost of €300,000. The renovations included: alterations to the platforms to bring them up to the metropolitan standard (height 55 cm), making boarding easier and more comfortable; new flooring on the platforms and in the booking hall; maintenance to the ceilings and windows; an improved interior lighting system and integration of a new lighting system outside; upholstery cleaning; restoration of the facade; alterations to existing technology systems; installation of tactile paving for the vision impaired; renovation of toilets and the construction of a glass canopy to protect access to them.

=== Station yard ===
The station yard consists of three tracks used for passenger services. Each is equipped with a platform, but only one platform is covered by a canopy. The tracks are connected by a pedestrian underpass.

Track 1 is used for overtaking or passing between trains, which happens quite often, because the station is located on a single track line. Track 2 is for stops by through trains, and track 3 is used for trains originating or terminating in Macerata.

There are two other detached buildings, both double storey and used for the passenger services, on the other side of the tracks from the passenger building.

The station has a large goods yard with a goods shed adjoining the loading bay of track 1. Its design is very similar to those of other Italian stations: a long rectangular building, in brick with a sloping roof. There are no longer any goods services to the station, so the goods shed has been converted into a bus terminal.

== Passenger and train movements ==
The station has about 900,000 passenger movements each year.

Only regional trains stop at the station. Their main origins and destinations are Ancona, Ascoli Piceno, Civitanova and Fabriano.

== Interchange ==
The station has a bus terminal for urban and suburban buses.

== See also ==
- History of rail transport in Italy
- List of railway stations in the Marche
- Rail transport in Italy
- Railway stations in Italy
