= Carla Voltolina =

Italian partisan and journalist (1921–2005)

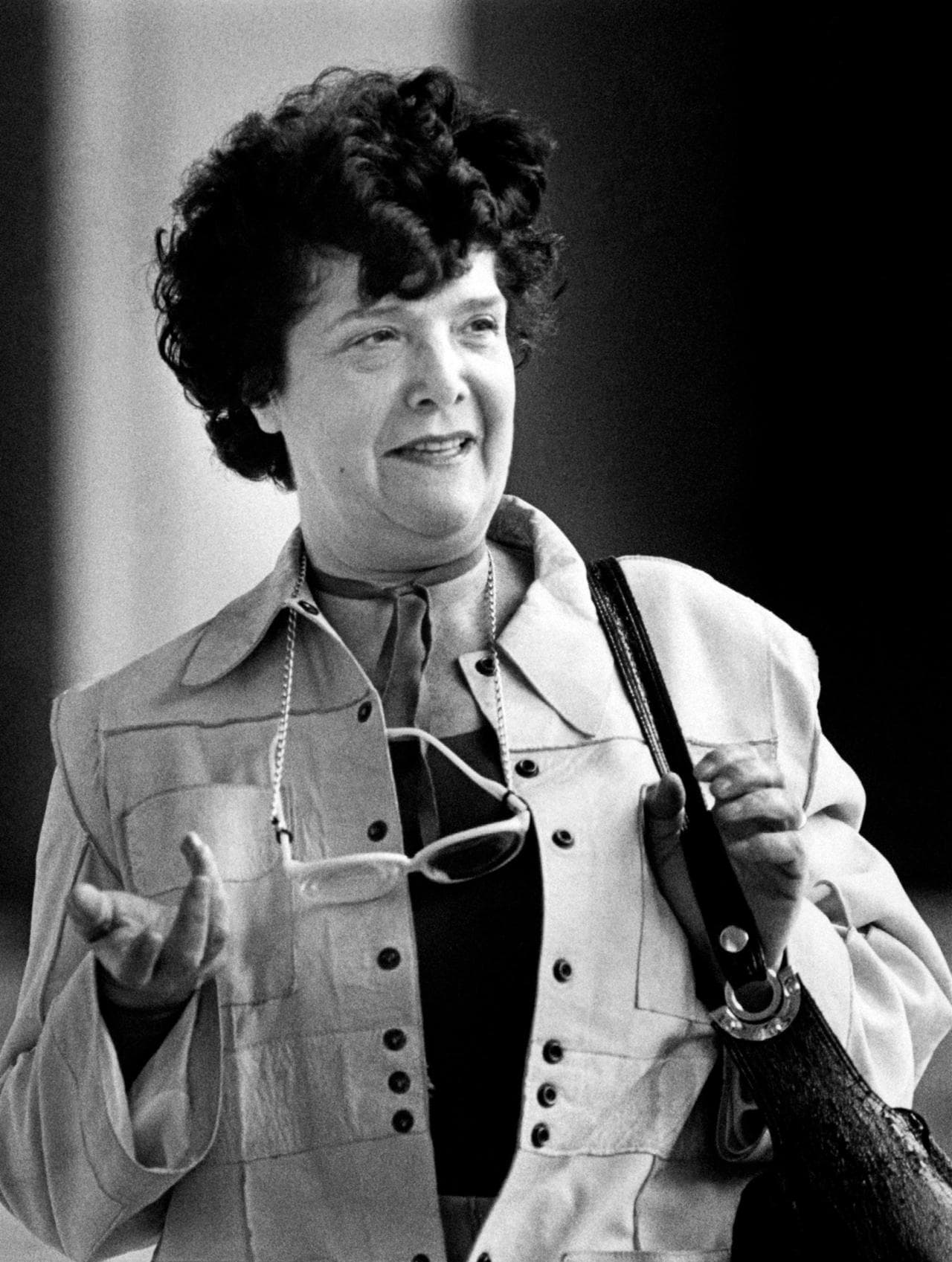
- Voltolina in 1980

Companion of the President of Italy
- In role 9 July 1978 – 29 June 1985
- President: Sandro Pertini
- Preceded by: Vittoria Michitto
- Succeeded by: Giuseppa Sigurani

Personal details
- Born: 14 June 1921 Turin, Kingdom of Italy
- Died: 6 December 2005 (aged 84) Rome, Italy
- Resting place: Stella, Italy
- Spouse: Sandro Pertini (m. 1946; died 1990)
- Education: University of Florence; University of Turin

Carla Voltolina (14 June 1921 – 6 December 2005), also known as Carla Pertini since marriage, was an Italian journalist, partisan and psychotherapist. She undertook investigations into prostitution in Italy and provided therapy at hospitals and addiction-treatment clinics across Italy.

As the spouse of Sandro Pertini, she was the Companion of the President of the Italian Republic from 1978 to 1985.

== Biography ==
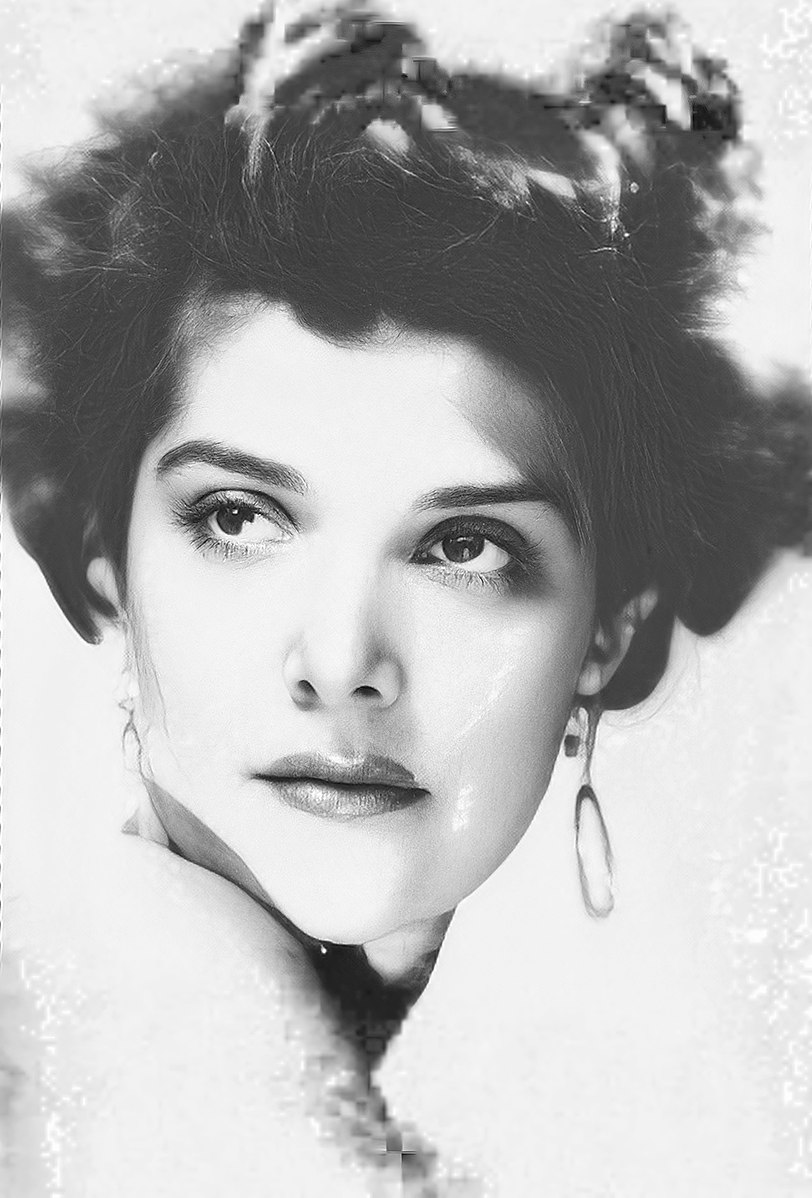
Voltolina at a young age

Born in Turin, Carla Voltolina was the daughter of Luigi, an official of the Italian army from Chioggia, and Rosa Barberis, from Piovà Massaia. She had two sisters, Laura and Luisa, and one brother, Umberto (born 1940). When Voltolina was six, her father signed her up for swimming and she won several trophies by competing with the youth division of Juventus. In 1938, Carla dropped out of school. She later completed evening courses and took additional examinations to enter Bocconi University.

After September 8, 1943, Voltolina joined the Italian resistance movement as a courier (known as staffette) for the Matteotti groups, first in Turin and then in Marche. Arrested by the SS during an operation, she escaped thanks to the help of a doctor. In German-occupied Rome, she collaborated with the secret, socialist press of Eugenio Colorni. After the liberation of Rome, she remained committed to the Italian Resistance and transferred to the still-occupied north of Italy. During that time, she met Sandro Pertini, who had come to the region as a representative of the National Liberation Committee (Comitato di Liberazione Nazionale). Pertini was already well known for his imprisonment and exile from Fascist Italy. They met in Milan, on the way to Modena, in the house of the lawyer Arialdo Banfi. They lived together for two years, and on June 8, 1946, they received a civil marriage in the new Italian Republic.

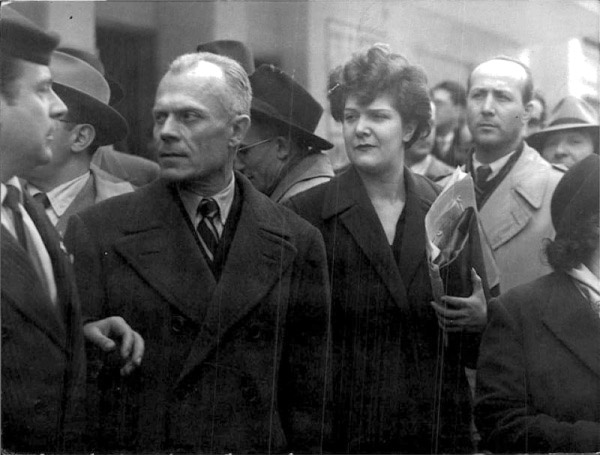
Carla Voltolina with Sandro Pertini during the liberation of Milan, April 1945

They went to live in Rome in an apartment given to them by Leonida Repaci. Afterwards, they moved to an apartment in the EUR neighborhood in a group of houses build for deputies. When Pertini became president of the Camera, they moved to Montecitorio, and they eventually moved to an attic apartment only 35 meters (115 ft) from the Trevi Fountain in via della Stamperia.

Immediately after the marriage, Voltolina began her journalistic work. She joined the Ordine dei giornalisti in 1945 and collaborated with Il Lavoro of Genoa and the periodical Noi Donne. With the socialist senator Lina Merlin, Voltolina began an investigation into prostitution in Italy, which produced the book Lettere dalle case chiuse (Voltolina wrote under the pseudonym "Carla Barberis") and contributed to the closure of Italian brothels.

Her journalistic career, which focused on investigations and parliamentary reports, was interrupted when Pertini was elected President of the Chamber of Deputies in 1968. It was no longer considered ethical for her to compose parliamentary reports given the new role of her husband, so Voltolina stopped her journalism. Citing her husband's role, she even refused the presidency of the Italian Red Cross, saying:

"I thought that it would be right that my person would not be confused with that of the President. The Italians elected Sandro, not me. I have nothing to do with it. For this, I live looking to not even be known as the wife of the President of the Republic. I am Doctor Voltolina, and that's enough."

So, at 51 years of age, Voltolina decided to resume her university studies that had been interrupted by the war. She received high honors in political science from the Istituto "Cesare Alfieri" di Firenze, with a thesis on homes for the elderly. Five years later, she received a second degree in social sciences with a specialization in psychology from the Università di Torino, after researching the labor conditions of factory workers.

Voltolina was active in the Servizio farmacodipendenza e alcolismo at the Policlinico Gemelli of Rome, the Monteverde hospital, and the diagnostic and psychiatric services of Santa Maria Nuova in Florence. There she also served as a volunteer psychotherapist, an activity she also performed in Prato, Tuscany, and for which she was honored with the keys to the city in 1999.

She was subscribed to the military district of Rome as a "decorated combatant with the Croce di guerra" for her assignment in the Resistance. On September 23, 2002, she founded the Florentine Fondazione Sandro Pertini. From the day of her husband's death in 1990, she decided to be called Carla Pertini, which she had previously always refused, preferring to use the name she was born with.

In 2003, she donated her husband's 1962 Fiat 500 to the Museo dell'automobile di Torino.

Voltolina died on December 6, 2005. Her last wish was to be cremated, and her ashes were buried alongside the tomb of Pertini, in the cemetery of Stella.

== Controversies ==
=== Visit by the Pope ===
A short Il Secolo XIX article on July 17, 1990, reported that, while recovering at Policlinico Umberto I in Rome, Sandro Pertini had requested before he died to see his friend Pope John Paul II and that Pertini's friends and family, including Voltolina, had discouraged the visit. The circumstances were confirmed 17 years later by Arturo Mari, a photographer of L'Osservatore Romano.

Voltolina categorically denied the accusations. The vice president of the Fondazione Pertini, Piero Pierri, said that Voltolina was never opposed to the friendship between her husband and the Pope. Pierri blamed the confusion on an episode of March 23, 1987, after the funeral of general Licio Giorgieri. Pertini fell ill and was recovering in the Roman clinic but was not able to receive a Papal visit due to a medical prohibition.

=== Biographical film on Pertini ===
In 1993, for personal reasons, Voltolina blocked the broadcast of the TV film Se ci sarà un giorno produced by Sandro Parenzo and directed by Franco Rossi for RaiDue. The film was made to celebrate Pertini, who had died three years before. The role of Pertini had been entrusted to Maurizio Crozza, while Carla Signoris played Matilde Ferrari, the young fiancé who remained at home while Pertini fled to France and waited for 18 years before giving him up. The film was broadcast only once on Rai 3 on May 31, 2003, to c. 34,000 viewers:

"No one wished to displease Mrs. Voltolina. She said that the love story with Matilde was not true, that it disgraced the figure of the President. I tried to convince her. There was no way. She was an unusual person, she even involved the Quirinal [i.e. the Presidency]."

— Giampaolo Sodano, director of RaiDue

Afterwards, a media campaign by Il Secolo XIX secured the permission of Rai director Antonio Marano, and the film was recovered. It was broadcast on the digital channel Rai Storia on February 24, 2010, on the twentieth anniversary of Sandro Pertini's death.

== Legacy ==
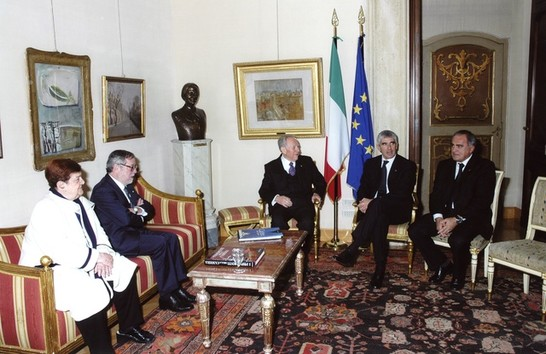
Presentation of a volume of Sandro Pertini: Discorsi parlamentari 1945–1976 with Carla Voltolina, Pier Ferdinando Casini, Giovanni Maria Flick, and Carlo Azeglio Ciampi

Carla Voltolina collected the materials on her and her husband that created the Fondazione Pertini, of which she was president between 1995 and 2002. The archive is divided into four sections:

- the condolence messages received by Voltolina after Pertini's death;
- a collection of commemorative documentation on the inauguration of the Pertini museum in Savona and the 600 volumes they donated to the Università degli Studi di Siena, as well as the commemorative stamps, notes, and initiatives of students in 1999 to 2000;
- the private correspondence and a collection of personal documents on the elderly, women, drugs, Sigmund Freud and other materials Voltolina collected in her studies of psychology from 1955 to 1995; and
- Voltolina's correspondence as president of the Fondazione Pertini.

The archive was then donated to the Fondazione di studi storici Filippo Turati in Florence (part of the Ministry of Cultural Heritage and Activities and Tourism archival system) on February 27, 2015.

== Awards ==
Croce di Guerra al valor militare - ribbon for ordinary uniform

Croce di Guerra al valor militare

Dama di Gran Croce dell'Ordine di Sant'Agata (San Marino)

Dama di Gran Croce dell'Ordine di Sant'Agata (San Marino)

== Bibliography ==
- Giancarlo De Cataldo (16 November 2017). Il combattente. Come si diventa Pertini. Rizzoli. p. 224. ISBN 978-88-586-9160-1.
- Antonio Martino (2013). Pertini e altri socialisti savonesi nelle carte della R. Questura. Lulu.com. ISBN 978-1-291-28858-2.
- Braga, Antonella; Steiner, Luisa (November 2018). Carla Voltolina (in Italian). Milano: Edizioni Unicopli. ISBN 9788840020464.
- Severini, Paola (2008). Le mogli della Repubblica: la storia d'Italia vista con gli occhi delle donne (in Italian). Venezia: Marsilio. ISBN 9788831795272.

Unofficial roles
Preceded by Vittoria Micchitto	Companion of the President of Italy; 1978–1985	Succeeded by Giuseppa Sigurani
