= Fano railway station =

Railway station in Fano, Italy

Fano
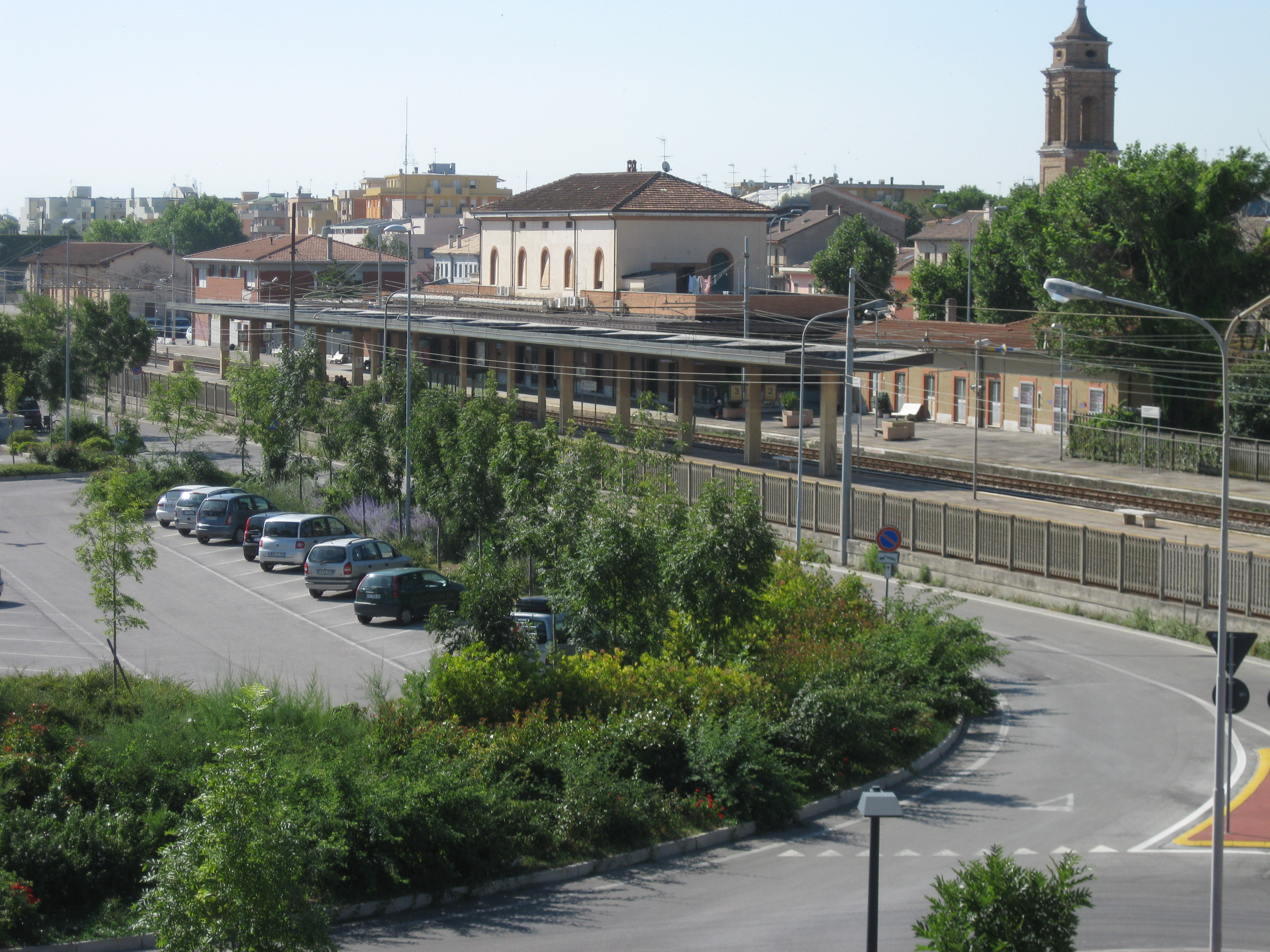
- The train station as seen from the north

General information
- Location: Piazzale della Stazione; Fano, Pesaro e Urbino, Marche
- Coordinates: 43°50′34″N 13°01′28″E
- Operator: Rete Ferroviaria Italiana
- Lines: Bologna–Ancona; Fano-Urbino (until 1987)
- Tracks: 4
- Train operators: Trenitalia
- Connections: Urban and suburban buses

Other information
- Classification: Silver
Location
- Location within Marche Location within Italy

Fano railway station (Italian: Stazione di Fano) is a railway station serving the city of Fano in the Marche region of Italy.

It is located along the Bologna-Ancona railway; until 1987, it also served as a terminus for the regional Fano-Urbino railway.

== Location ==
The train station is located in Piazzale della Stazione, south-west of the historical city centre, facing Bastione Sangallo, part of Fano defensive wall.

== Features ==
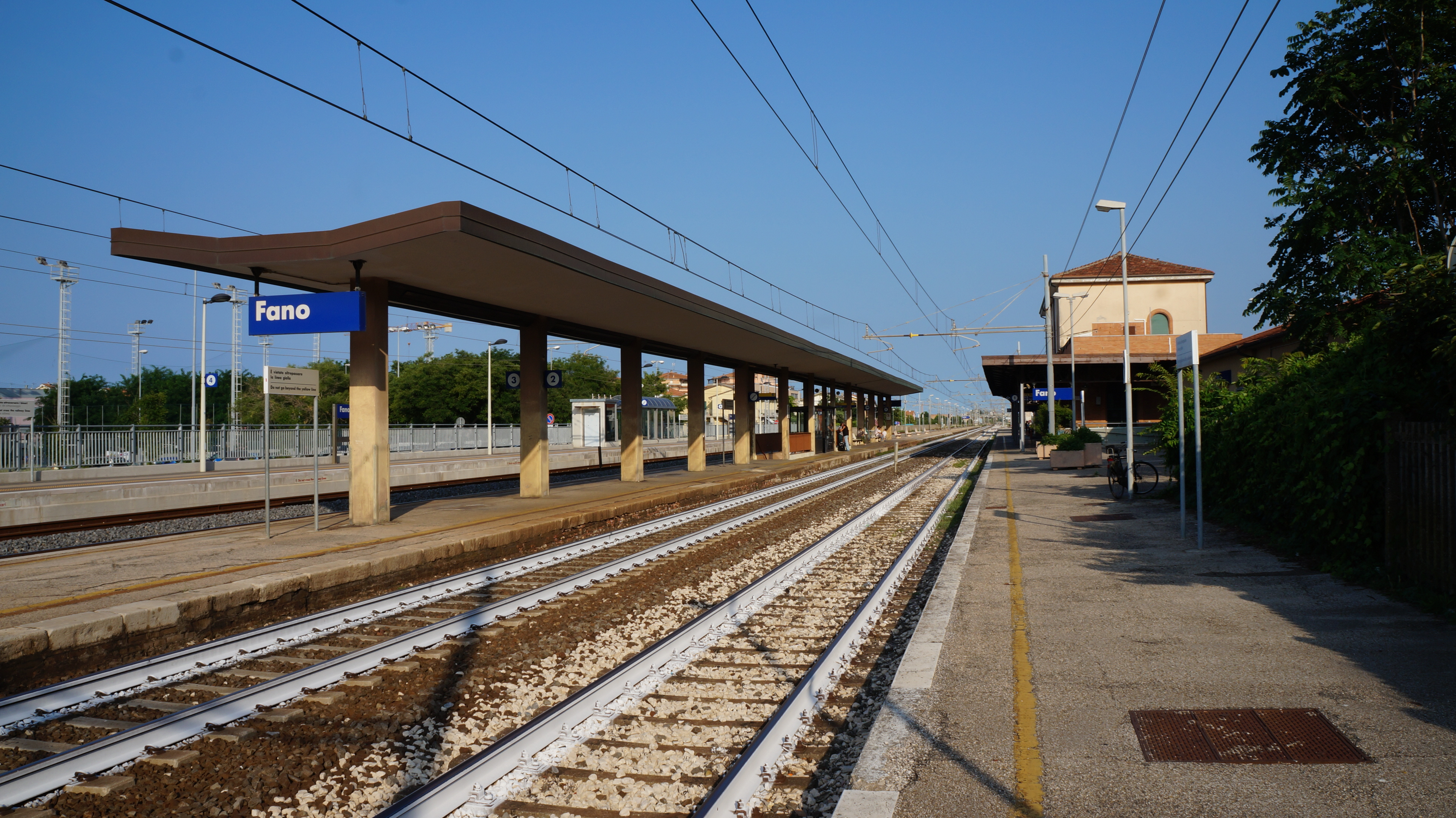
Close view from track 1 platform

The train station has 4 tracks dedicated to passenger traffic, the main ones being tracks 2 and 3, divided by one platform, whereas tracks 1 and 4 are used occasionally for coasting slower trains while faster trains pass through the station. Track 1 was once served by trains to and from Urbino. An underpass links the Piazzale in front of the main building to the car parking situated behind-it is accessible by stairs and ramps on both ends. Only track 4 has a lift for moving people between the underpass and the platform, making it the only track fully accessible; the platform served by tracks 2 and 3 is, as of December 2025, accessible only by stairs. The train station is going for a full renovation of both the main building and the platform as a whole, with the first one already under renovation since September 2024.

== Train services ==
The passenger services to stop in this station are:

- Regional trains, linking Fano with several cities in central Italy (e.g. Pesaro, Ancona, Rimini...);
- Intercity trains towards Turin and Milan in the north, Bari and Lecce in the south.

== Interchange ==
South of the main building, a bus terminal is located for urban and suburban lines.

== See also ==
- History of rail transport in Italy
- List of railway stations in the Marche
- Rail transport in Italy
- Railway stations in Italy
