= Sandro Pertini =

President of Italy from 1978 to 1985

Sandro Pertini OMCA
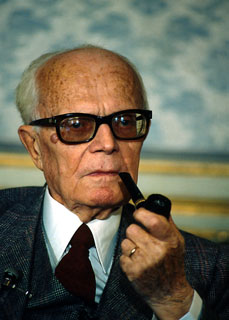
- Pertini, c. 1980–85

President of Italy
- In office 9 July 1978 – 29 June 1985
- Prime Minister: Giulio Andreotti; Francesco Cossiga; Arnaldo Forlani; Giovanni Spadolini; Amintore Fanfani; Bettino Craxi
- Preceded by: Giovanni Leone
- Succeeded by: Francesco Cossiga

President of the Chamber of Deputies
- In office 5 June 1968 – 4 July 1976
- Preceded by: Brunetto Bucciarelli-Ducci
- Succeeded by: Pietro Ingrao

Secretary of the Italian Socialist Party
- In office 1 August 1945 – 18 December 1945
- Preceded by: Pietro Nenni
- Succeeded by: Rodolfo Morandi
Parliamentary offices
Member of the Senate of the Republic
Ex officio
Life tenure 29 June 1985 – 24 February 1990
In office 8 May 1948 – 24 June 1953 (Ex officio) (Note: As a member of the Constituent Assembly of Italy, he was automatically nominated senator.)
Member of the Chamber of Deputies
In office 25 June 1953 – 7 July 1978
Constituency	Genoa–Imperia–La Spezia–Savona
Member of the Constituent Assembly
In office 25 June 1946 – 31 January 1948
Constituency	Genoa–Imperia–La Spezia–Savona

Personal details
- Born: Alessandro Giuseppe Antonio Pertini; 25 September 1896 Stella, Liguria, Kingdom of Italy
- Died: 24 February 1990 (aged 93) Rome, Lazio, Italy
- Resting place: Stella, Liguria, Italy
- Party: PSU (1924–1930); PSI (1930–1990)
- Spouse: Carla Voltolina (m. 1946)
- Education: University of Genoa; University of Modena and Reggio Emilia; University of Florence

Alessandro Giuseppe Antonio "Sandro" Pertini (Note: Italian pronunciation: [(ales)ˈsandro perˈtiːni].) (25 September 1896 – 24 February 1990) was an Italian journalist, socialist politician, partisan and statesman who served as the president of Italy from 1978 to 1985.

== Early life ==
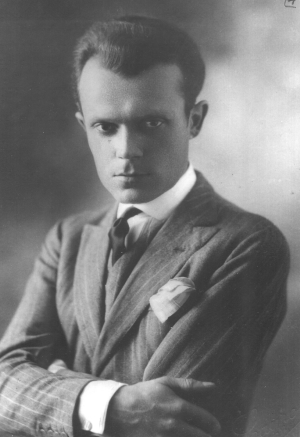
A young Pertini in the 1920s

Born in Stella, Liguria, as the son of a wealthy landowner, Alberto, he studied at a Salesian college in Varazze, and completed his schooling at the Chiabrera high school in Savona. His philosophy teacher was Adelchi Baratono, a reformist socialist who contributed to his approach to socialism and probably introduced him to the inner circles of the Ligurian labour movements. Pertini obtained a law degree from the University of Genoa.

Aged 19 when Italy entered World War I on the side of the Triple Entente, Pertini opposed the war, but nonetheless enlisted in the army where he served as a lieutenant and was decorated for bravery. After the armistice in 1918, he joined the Unitary Socialist Party, PSU, then he settled in Florence where he also graduated in political science with a thesis entitled La Cooperazione ("Cooperation"; 1924). While in the city, Pertini also came into contact with people such as Gaetano Salvemini, the brothers Carlo and Nello Rosselli, and Ernesto Rossi. Pertini was physically beaten by Fascist squads on several occasions, but never lost faith in his ideals.

== Opposition to Fascism and Resistance to Nazism ==
"To the most perfect dictatorship, I will always prefer an imperfect democracy."

(Original: "Alla più perfetta delle dittature preferirò sempre la più imperfetta delle democrazie.")

After the assassination of PSU leader Giacomo Matteotti by Fascists in 1924, Pertini became even more committed to the struggle against the totalitarian regime. In 1926, he was sentenced to internment but managed to go into hiding. Later, together with Carlo Rosselli and Ferruccio Parri, he organized and accompanied the escape to France of Filippo Turati, who was the most prominent figure of the PSU. Pertini remained in the country until 1926 working as a mason. According to the Italian historian of Freemasonry Aldo Alessandro Mola, during that period Pertini had relationships with exponents of the Grand Orient of Italy who were in exile in France. This hypothesis seems unsupported by known documents from archives. On his return to Italy, he was arrested in Pisa, tried, and sentenced to ten years' imprisonment.

Sandro Pertini's radio message, 25 April 1945
Pertini proclaiming a general strike against the Nazi occupation on 25 April 1945, which would become Italy's Liberation Day.

In 1935 he was interned on Santo Stefano Island, Ventotene (LT), Pontine Islands, an island in the Tyrrhenian Sea, where he remained through Italy's entry into World War II and until 1943. Although he had begun suffering from severe illness, Pertini never demanded pardon. He was released a month after Benito Mussolini's arrest and joined the Italian resistance movement against the Nazi German occupiers and Mussolini's new puppet regime – the Italian Social Republic. Arrested by the Germans, he was sentenced to death but freed by a partisan raid. Pertini then travelled north to organize partisan war as an executive member of the Italian Socialist Party (the PSI, which the PSU had rejoined) alongside Rodolfo Morandi and Lelio Basso. He had a primary role in the Milan uprising of 25 April 1945, which led to the execution of Mussolini and the liberation of Italy.

== Prominence ==
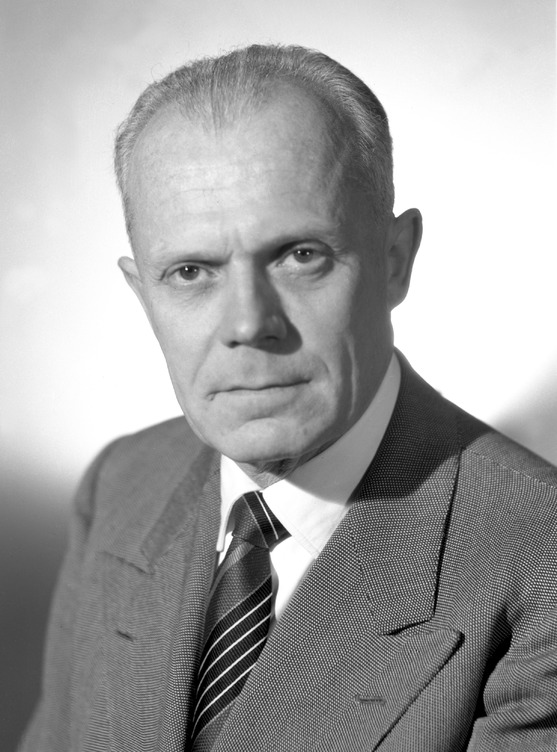
Official senatorial portrait, 1948

After the war ended in Italy on 25 April 1945 and the monarchy was abolished through the 1946 Italian constitutional referendum, Pertini was elected to the Constituent Assembly (La Costituente), the body that prepared the new republican Italian Constitution.

In the postwar era, as a senator by virtue of his membership in the Constituent Assembly, he was a prominent member of the directive board of the PSI. In spite of his intransigent attitude toward the Italian Communist Party (PCI), Pertini was also suspicious of many policies enforced by the PSI. He criticized all forms of colonialism, as well as corruption in the Italian state and within the Socialist Party, where he kept an independent political position.

He was elected president of the Italian Chamber of Deputies in 1968.

== Presidency (1978–1985) ==
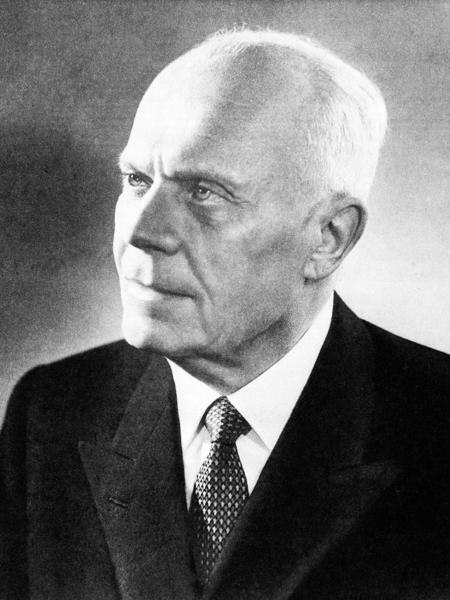
Official portrait, 1978

In 1978, the 81-year-old Pertini was elected President of the Italian Republic, the highest office in the nation. Despite his advanced age, he displayed considerable energy and vigour, playing a major role in helping restore the public's faith in the government and institutions of Italy, as well as maintaining an active schedule of travelling and meeting foreign dignitaries. During the Brigate Rosse terrorism period of the Anni di piombo, Pertini openly denounced the violence. He also opposed organized crime in Italy, South African apartheid, Chilean dictator Augusto Pinochet and other dictatorial regimes, as well as the Soviet invasion of Afghanistan.

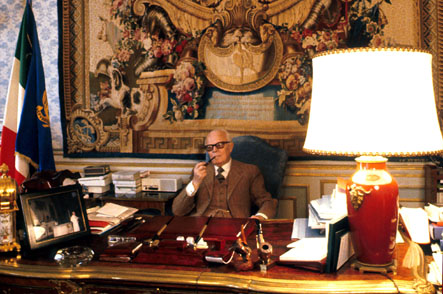
President Sandro Pertini in his office at the Quirinal Palace

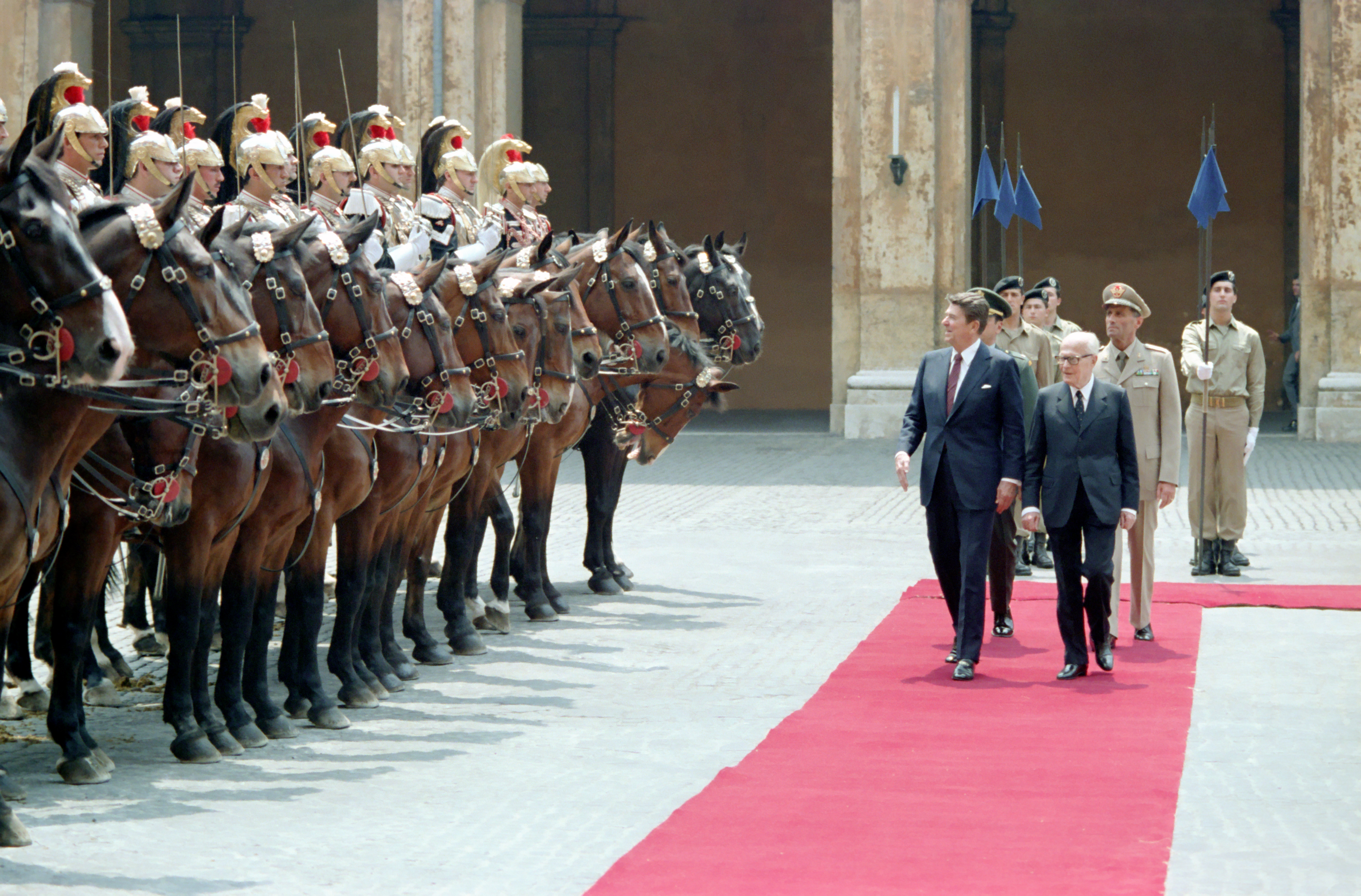
Pertini and U.S. President Ronald Reagan review troops at the Quirinal, 1982

In 1981, Pertini presided over the formation of the government by Giovanni Spadolini, the first non Christian Democratic Italian government since the time of De Gasperi.

In 1985, he stepped down from the presidency, becoming automatically senator for life. The only official role he accepted in his retirement was President of the "Filippo Turati" Foundation for Historical Studies of Florence inaugurated in 1985 and dedicated to recording and preserving the history of the socialist movement in Italy. In December 1988 Pertini was the first person to be awarded the Otto Hahn Peace Medal in Gold by the United Nations Association of Germany (Deutsche Gesellschaft für die Vereinten Nationen, DGVN) in Berlin, "for outstanding services to peace and international understanding, especially for his political ethics and practical humanity". Pertini died in February 1990 at the age of 93 and was mourned across the nation. Two days of mourning were declared by the Italian government.

== Public image ==
=== 1982 World Cup Final ===
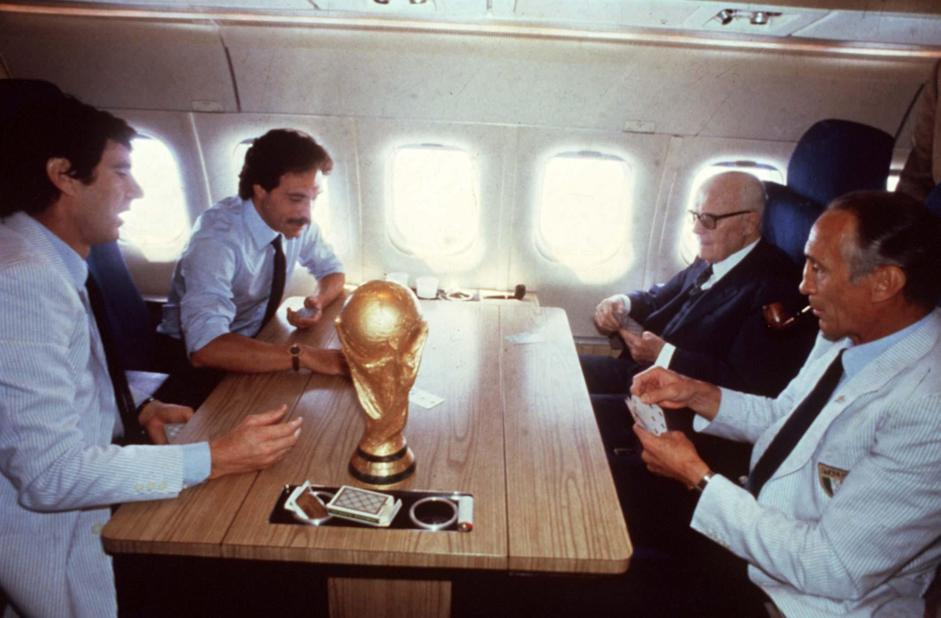
Dino Zoff, Franco Causio, Sandro Pertini and Enzo Bearzot playing cards on the flight back to Italy

Pertini attended the 1982 World Cup Final in Madrid for a match between Italy and West Germany just two days after the fourth anniversary of his inauguration. After Italy scored their third goal, he wagged his finger to either the German delegation or King Juan Carlos I, and said "they [the German team] will not catch us any more". Memorable images from the event are Pertini standing on his chair at Santiago Bernabéu Stadium, exulting in the Italian victory, and the card game on the return flight, between the president and three team members (coach Enzo Bearzot and players Franco Causio and Dino Zoff), the world cup trophy next to them on the table.

Paolo Rossi, Italy's and the tournament's top scorer, later said: "I remember that when he welcomed us at the Presidential Palace after our win, he rose and said: 'This is my best day as President.'"

=== Relationship with Pope John Paul II ===
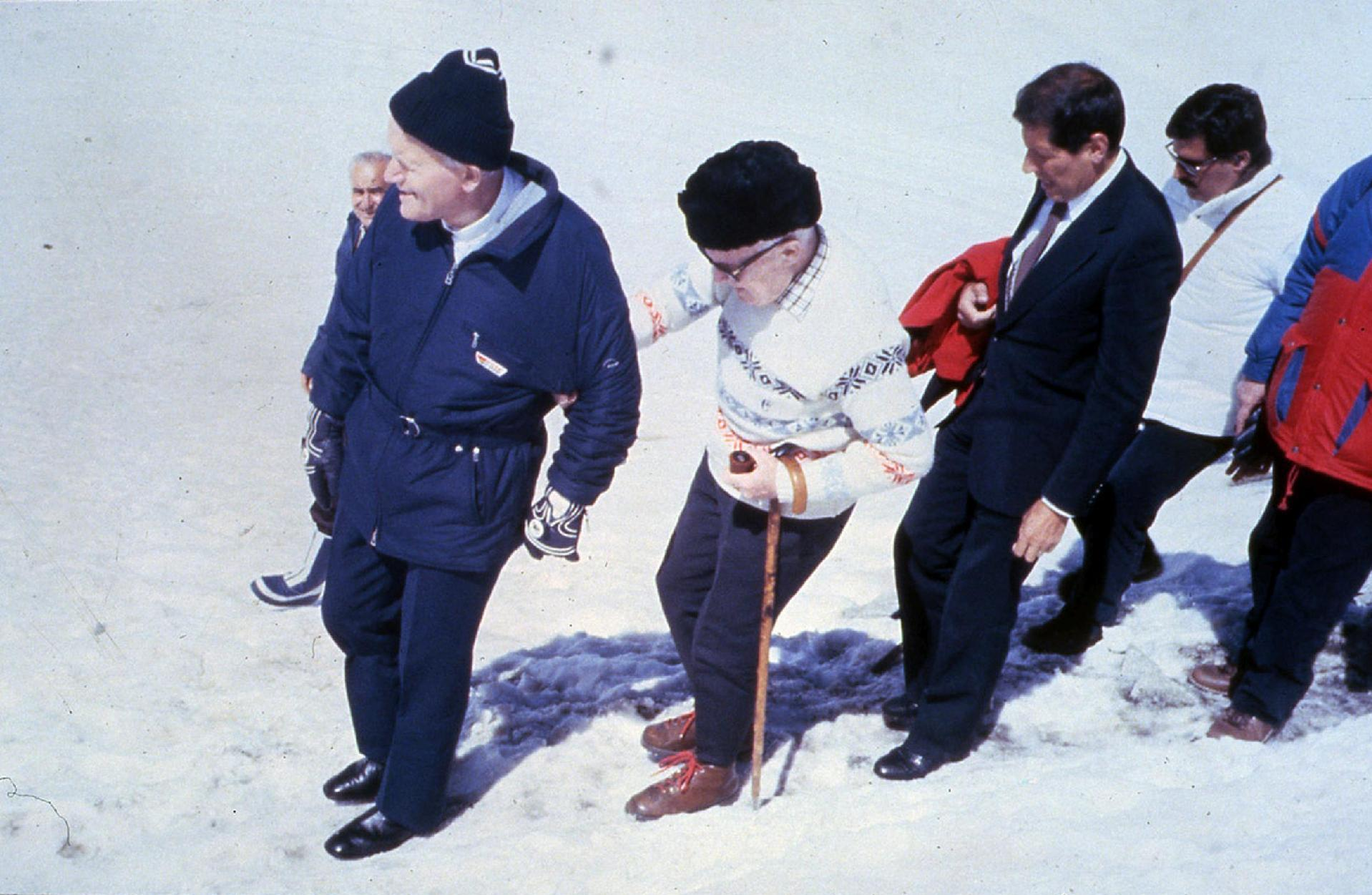
President Sandro Pertini and Pope John Paul II on a secret skiing trip on Mt. Adamello, 16 June 1984

Sandro Pertini had a close friendship with Pope John Paul II, with whom he met often both for official and private occasions, and had frequent phone conversations. In Accanto a Giovanni Paolo II, he is known to have referred to his mother looking over him in heaven, moved that her atheist son was friends with the Pope.

On 13 May 1981, he went to the Gemelli Hospital as soon as he heard that the Pope had been shot, and stayed until late in the night when he was told that the Pope was not in danger anymore. He recalled the event later that year in the annual New Year's Eve Presidential Address to the Italian People.

== Personal life ==
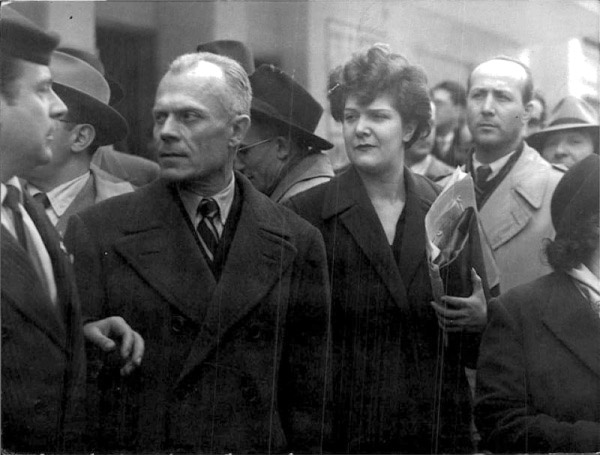
Pertini and Voltolina during the liberation of Italy, April 1945

In 1946, Pertini married fellow resistance member Carla Voltolina, who remained his wife until his death and served as the companion of the President of Italy during his presidential tenure.

== Honours and awards ==
In 1986, he received the Freedom medal. On 11 October 1979, President of Yugoslavia Tito awarded Pertini the Order of the Yugoslav Great Star.

== In popular culture ==
In the 1975 film Last Days of Mussolini by Carlo Lizzani, there is a character inspired by Pertini, performed by Sergio Graziani. In early 1980s, Andrea Pazienza created the comic book series Il Partigiano Pert ("The Partisan Pert"), a comedy strip portraying Pertini during World War II with the same cartoonist as his helper.

Pertini has been mentioned in some verses of several Italian songs, as in Sotto la pioggia ("under the rain", 1982) by Antonello Venditti, Babbo Rock ("Daddy Rock", 1982) by the Skiantos, L'Italiano ("The Italian", 1983) by Toto Cutugno, Caro Presidente ("Dear President", 1984) by Daniele Shook, Pertini Dance (1984) by the S.C.O.R.T.A., Pertini Is A Genius, Mirinzini Is Not Famous (2007) by the Ex-Otago.

== Electoral history ==
Election	House	Constituency	Party	Votes	Result
1946	Constituent Assembly	Genoa–Imperia–La Spezia–Savona	PSIUP	27,870	Elected
1953	Chamber of Deputies	Genoa–Imperia–La Spezia–Savona	PSI	22,802	Elected
1958	Chamber of Deputies	Genoa–Imperia–La Spezia–Savona	PSI	19,966	Elected
1963	Chamber of Deputies	Genoa–Imperia–La Spezia–Savona	PSI	22,579	Elected
1968	Chamber of Deputies	Genoa–Imperia–La Spezia–Savona	PSI	24,235	Elected
1972	Chamber of Deputies	Genoa–Imperia–La Spezia–Savona	PSI	53,657	Elected
1976	Chamber of Deputies	Genoa–Imperia–La Spezia–Savona	PSI	35,506	Elected

== Notes ==
Party political offices
Preceded by Pietro Nenni	Secretary of the Italian Socialist Party; 1945	Succeeded by Ivan Matteo Lombardo
Political offices
Preceded by Brunetto Bucciarelli-Ducci	President of the Chamber of Deputies; 1968–1976	Succeeded by Pietro Ingrao
Preceded by Giovanni Leone	President of Italy; 1978–1985	Succeeded by Francesco Cossiga
