= Companion of the president of the Italian Republic =

First lady of Italy

- Consorte del Presidente della Repubblica Italiana
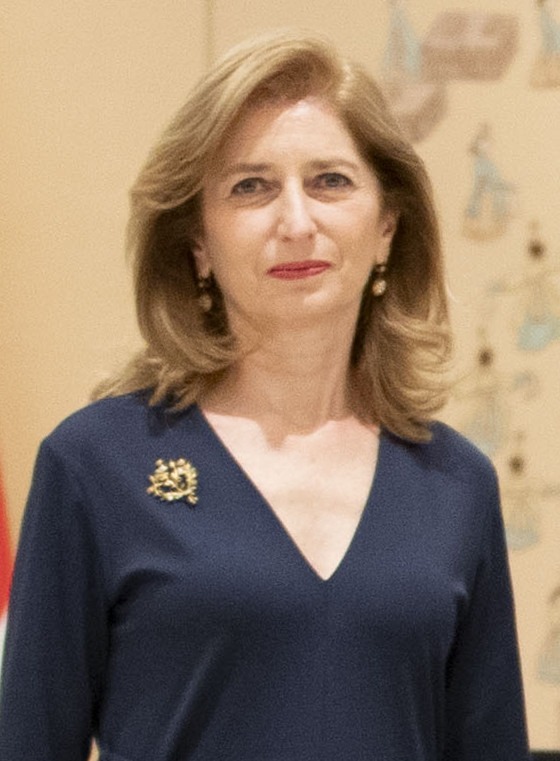
- Incumbent; Laura Mattarella since 3 February 2015
- Style: Mrs. Donna
- Residence: Quirinal Palace
- Inaugural holder: Ida Pellegrini
- Formation: May 12, 1948 (78 years ago)

The companion of the president of the Italian Republic (Italian: consorte del Presidente della Repubblica Italiana; sometimes simply known as Donna) is the first lady of Italy and often plays a protocol role at the Quirinal Palace and during official visits.

If the President of the Republic is single or widowed, the functions of the companion may be performed by another person as substitute companion, as in the case of incumbent President Sergio Mattarella, who was widowered three years before he assumed office in 2015. As a result, the unofficial position of first lady is currently held by his daughter Laura Mattarella.

== List ==
=== Spouses of the presidents ===
#	Name	Portrait	President	Period
1	Ida Pellegrini (1885–1968)		Luigi Einaudi	1948–1955
2	Carla Bissatini (1912–1993)		Giovanni Gronchi	1955–1962
3	Laura Carta Caprino (1896–1977)		Antonio Segni	1962–1964
4	Vittoria Michitto (b. 1928)		Giovanni Leone	1971–1978
5	Carla Voltolina (1921–2005)		Sandro Pertini	1978–1985
6	Giuseppa Sigurani (1936–2018)		Francesco Cossiga	1985–1992
7	Franca Pilla (b. 1920)		Carlo Azeglio Ciampi	1999–2006
8	Clio Maria Bittoni (1934–2024)		Giorgio Napolitano	2006–2015

=== Daughters of the presidents ===
#	Name	Portrait	President	Period
—	Ernestina Saragat (b. 1928)		Giuseppe Saragat	1964–1971
—	Marianna Scalfaro (b. 1944)		Oscar Luigi Scalfaro	1992–1999
—	Laura Mattarella (b. 1967)		Sergio Mattarella	2015–present

== See also ==
- First Lady
- List of presidents of Italy
