= Laura Mattarella =

Italian lawyer and First Lady of Italy

Donna Laura Mattarella
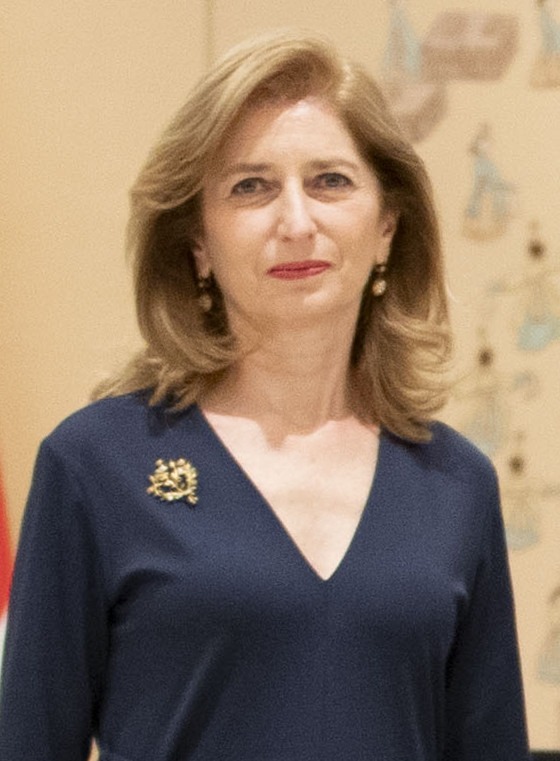
- Mattarella in 2023

Companion of the President of Italy
- Current
- Assumed role 3 February 2015
- President: Sergio Mattarella
- Preceded by: Clio Maria Bittoni

Personal details
- Born: 16 February 1967 (age 59) Palermo, Sicily, Italy
- Spouse: Cosimo Comella
- Children: 3
- Parents: Sergio Mattarella (father); Marisa Chiazzese (mother)
- Relatives: Bernardo Mattarella (grandfather); Piersanti Mattarella (uncle)
- Profession: Lawyer

Laura Mattarella (born 16 February 1967) is an Italian lawyer who is the current First Lady of Italy as the first child and the only daughter of President Sergio Mattarella, who has been in office since 2015.

== Early and personal life ==
Laura Mattarella is the daughter of President Sergio Mattarella and Marisa Chiazzese. A lawyer specialised in Administrative law, she gave up her professional practice during her father’s mandate in order to carry out the ceremonial and protocol duties traditionally associated with the President’s spouse, as President Mattarella has been a widower since the death of his wife Marisa Chiazzese in 2012. She is married and has three children. Her paternal grandfather, Bernardo Mattarella, served several times as a minister, while her uncle Piersanti Mattarella was assassinated by Cosa nostra while serving as President of the Sicilian Region. Her maternal grandfather was the jurist Lauro Chiazzese.

In the history of the Italian Republic, Laura Mattarella is the third woman who was not the President’s spouse to assume the representative role traditionally performed by the President’s consort in ceremonial protocol. Before her, two other Presidents were accompanied by their daughters rather than their wives, as they were widowers: Giuseppe Saragat by Ernestina Saragat and Oscar Luigi Scalfaro by Marianna Scalfaro.

== First Lady ==
President Sergio Mattarella is a widower since 2012, before his election in 2015. When he took office, the First Lady representation functions were then taken on by his daughter, who immediately accompanied her father on state trips and on visits within Italy.

Her first public appearance alongside her father took place during the reception for the 2015 Republic Day celebrations in the Quirinal Gardens. During the 2015 state visit to Vietnam, she also held independent engagements, including a private visit to a school in one of the poorest areas of Ho Chi Minh City.

In 2016, during the visit to Cameroon, she visited a refugee camp and a hospital founded by Italian missionaries. On that occasion, she stated in an interview that the focus should not be limited to assistance to disadvantaged people, but rather on improving living conditions through the reduction of marginalisation and poverty. In May 2017, during the official visit to Argentina, she visited a hospital dedicated to the prevention of infectious diseases and the promotion of oral hygiene among disadvantaged children.

During the July 2018 visit to Azerbaijan, she was awarded the Order of Glory by President Ilham Aliyev for her contribution to strengthening humanitarian relations between the two countries.

During her visit to Armenia, she paid tribute at the Tsitsernakaberd memorial, commemorating the Armenian genocide. On 19 January 2019, she attended the inauguration ceremony of Matera as European Capital of Culture. In February 2019, she visited Angola and its capital Luanda, paying tribute at the memorial of Agostinho Neto; she was the first Italian First Lady to do so. Her visit to Jordan in April 2019 provided an opportunity to strengthen peace ties between Italy and Jordan through interreligious dialogue between Christianity and Islam.

In Amman, she visited the Rafedin Atelier, where she met Catholic refugee women from Iraq engaged in the production of clothing and textiles. The visit concluded with the recitation of the Lord’s Prayer, sung in Aramaic by the Iraqi women. On 16 May 2019, she inaugurated the “Race for the Cure” village at the Circus Maximus in Rome, dedicated to breast cancer prevention, together with Mayor Virginia Raggi.

On 25 May 2019, she served as sponsor at the launching ceremony of the Italian Navy’s flagship Trieste at the shipyard of Castellammare di Stabia. It was the largest flagship launched by Italy since the end of the Second World War.

During the official visit to the United States, she visited Silicon Valley, San Francisco, and Pacific states. During the COVID-19 pandemic, she accompanied her father on a state visit to France in 2021 and attended Paris Fashion Week events by Giorgio Armani. On 7 February 2023, she attended the opening night of the Sanremo Music Festival 2023 together with President Sergio Mattarella to mark the 75th anniversary of the Italian Constitution. This was the first time an Italian President and consort participated in the event. In recognition of her sustained commitment to social and humanitarian causes, she was awarded the Marisa Bellisario Prize.

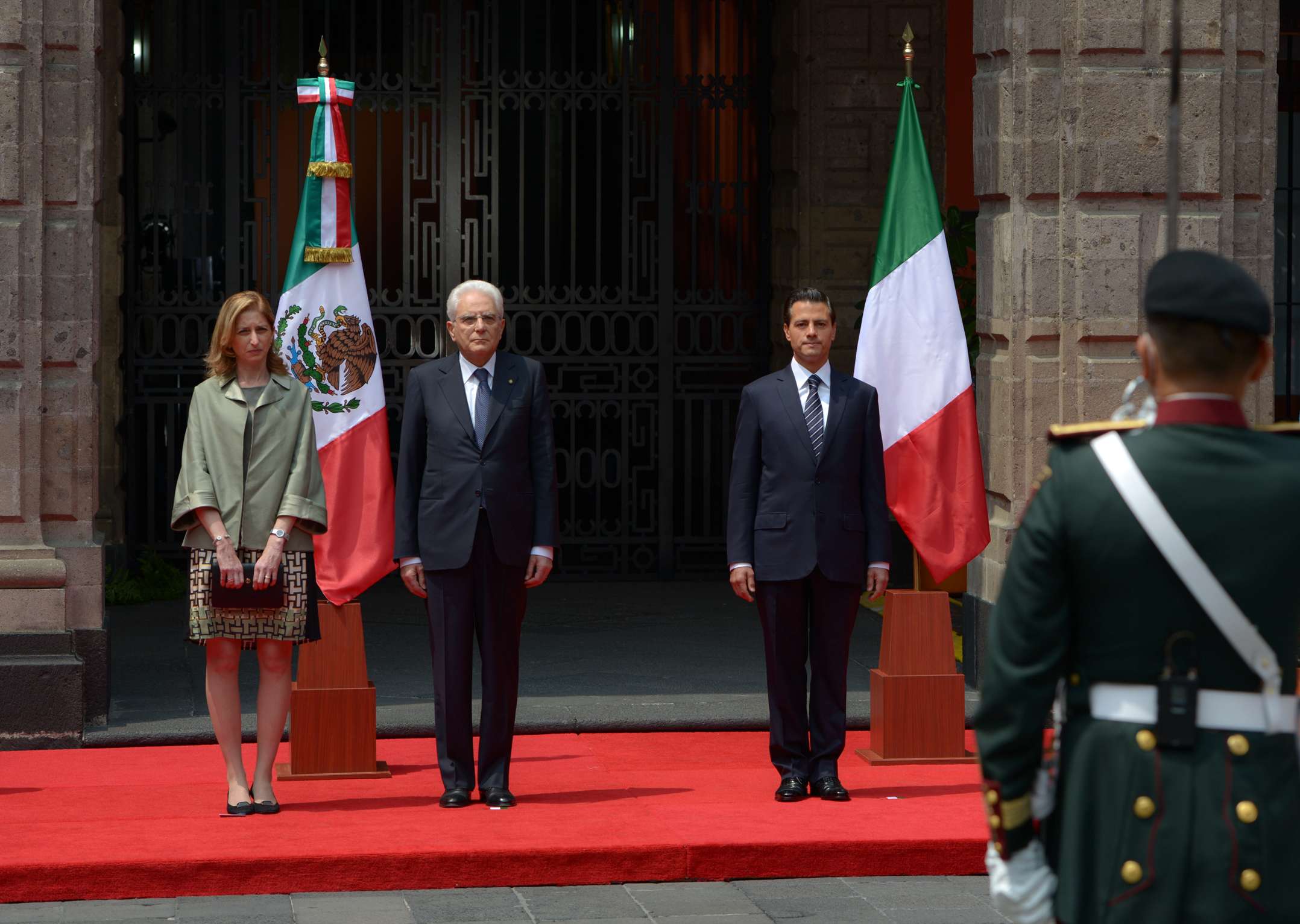
Laura with her father and President Enrique Peña Nieto during the state visit to Mexico in 2016

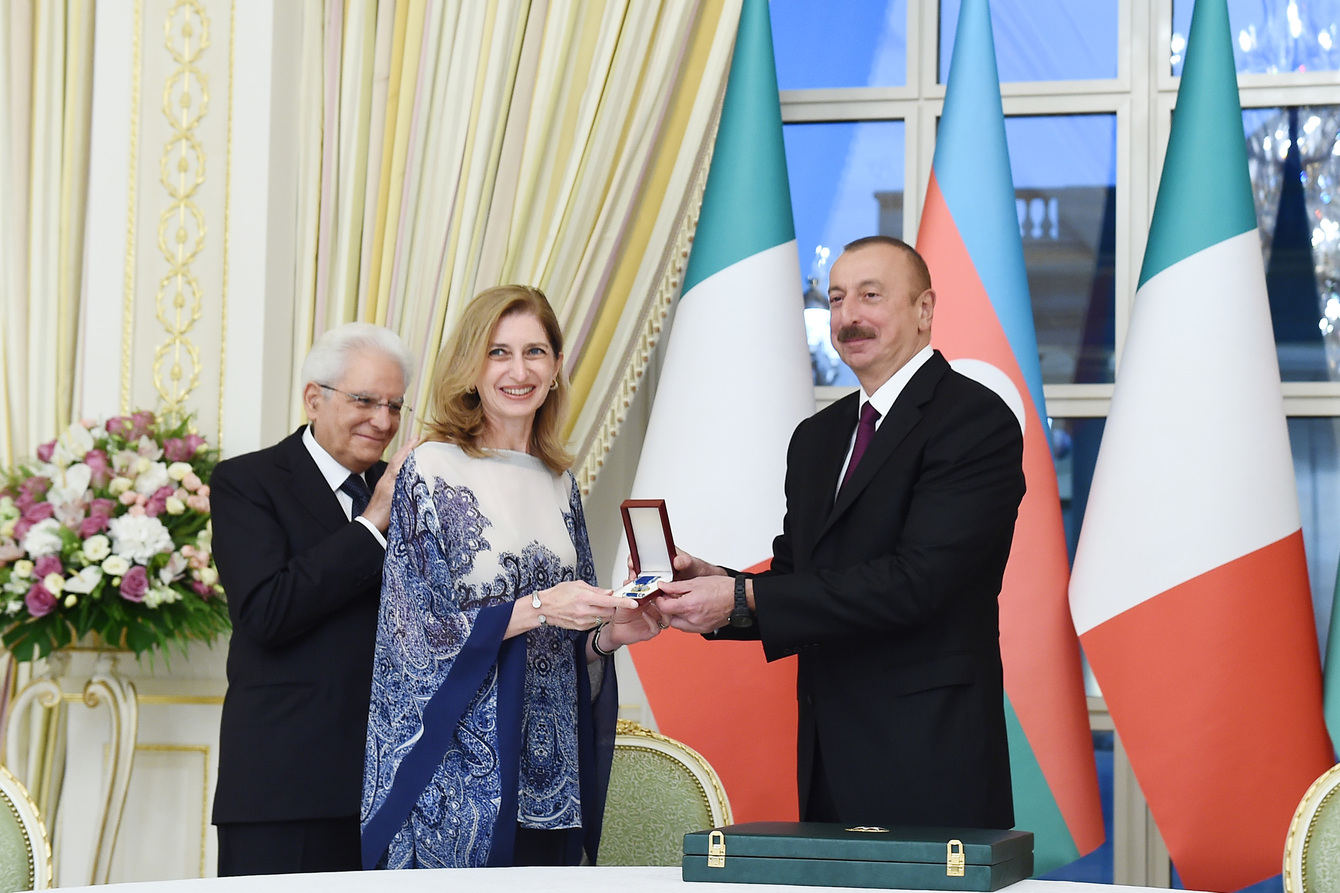
Laura Mattarella during the state visit to Azerbaijan in July 2018

- Vietnam: 6–8 November 2015
- Indonesia: 8–10 November 2015
- Oman: 10–11 November 2015
- Ethiopia: 14–16 March 2016
- Cameroon: 17–20 March 2016
- Mexico: 4–5 July 2016
- Greece: 17–18 January 2017
- China: 20–26 February 2017
- Finland: 26–28 September 2017
- (Republic of Ireland) Ireland: 14–15 February 2018
- Latvia: 2–3 July 2018
- Estonia: 4–5 July 2018
- Lithuania: 5–6 July 2018
- (Georgia (country)) Georgia: 16–17 July 2018
- Azerbaijan: 17–19 July 2018
- Armenia: 30–31 July 2018
- Sweden: 13–15 November 2018
- Angola: 5–7 February 2019
- Jordan: 9–11 April 2019
- Austria: 1–2 July 2019
- Denmark: 7–8 October 2019
- United States: 15–19 October 2019
- France: 4–6 July 2021
- Germany: 11–12 October 2021
- Spain: 16–17 November 2021
- Mozambique: 4–6 July 2022
- Zambia: 6–8 July 2022
- United Kingdom: 18–19 September 2022
- Netherlands: 8–11 November 2022
- Switzerland: 28–30 November 2022
- Kenya: 13–16 March 2023
- Poland: 16–19 April 2023
- Slovakia: 19–20 April 2023
- Norway: 10–12 May 2023
- Chile: 3–6 July 2023
- Paraguay: 6–8 July 2023
- South Korea: 6–9 November 2023
- Uzbekistan: 9–11 November 2023
- San Marino: 6 December 2023
- Cyprus: 26–27 February 2024
- Ivory Coast: 2–4 April 2024
- Ghana: 4–6 April 2024
- Bulgaria: 17–18 April 2024
- Brazil: 14–20 July 2024
- Japan: 2–9 March 2025
- Luxembourg: 10–11 June 2025
- Belgium: 19–22 October 2025

== Honours ==
=== Foreign honours ===
- Angola: Recipient of the Order of Agostinho Neto (25 May 2023)
- Austria: Grand Decoration of Honour in Gold with Sash for Services to the Republic of Austria (1 July 2019)
- Armenia: Recipient of the Order of Friendship (6 October 2021)
- Azerbaijan: Recipient of the Shohrat Order (18 July 2018)
- Belgium: Dame Grand Cross of the Order of the Crown (20 October 2025)
- Brazil: Dame Grand Cross of the Order of the Southern Cross (15 July 2024)
- Bulgaria: Member 1st Class of the Order of the Balkan Mountains (15 April 2024)
- Estonia: Member 1st Class of the Order of the Cross of Terra Mariana (2 July 2018)
- Finland: Commander Grand Cross of the Order of the White Rose of Finland (23 October 2023)
- France: Grand Officer of the Order of the Legion of Honour (5 July 2021)
- Germany: Grand Cross 1st class of the Order of Merit of the Federal Republic of Germany (19 September 2019)
- Greece: Grand Cross of the Order of Beneficence (17 January 2017)
- Latvia: Commander Grand Cross of the Order of the Three Stars (29 June 2018)
- Lithuania: Grand Cross of the Order of Merit (5 July 2018)
- Monaco: Grand Cross of the Order of Grimaldi (2 October 2026)
- The Netherlands: Grand Cross of the Order of the Crown (9 November 2022)
- Norway: Grand Cross of the Order of Merit (6 April 2016)
- Poland: Grand Cross of the Order of Merit of the Republic of Poland (17 April 2023)
- Romania: Grand Cross of the Order of the Star of Romania (15 October 2018)
- Spain: Dame Grand Cross of the Order of Isabella the Catholic (8 November 2021)
- Sweden: Member Grand Cross of the Royal Order of the Polar Star (13 November 2018)

Unofficial roles
Preceded by Clio Maria Bittoni	Companion of the President of Italy; 2015–present	Current holder
