= Franca Pilla =

First Lady of Italy from 1999 to 2006 (born 1920)

Donna Franca Pilla
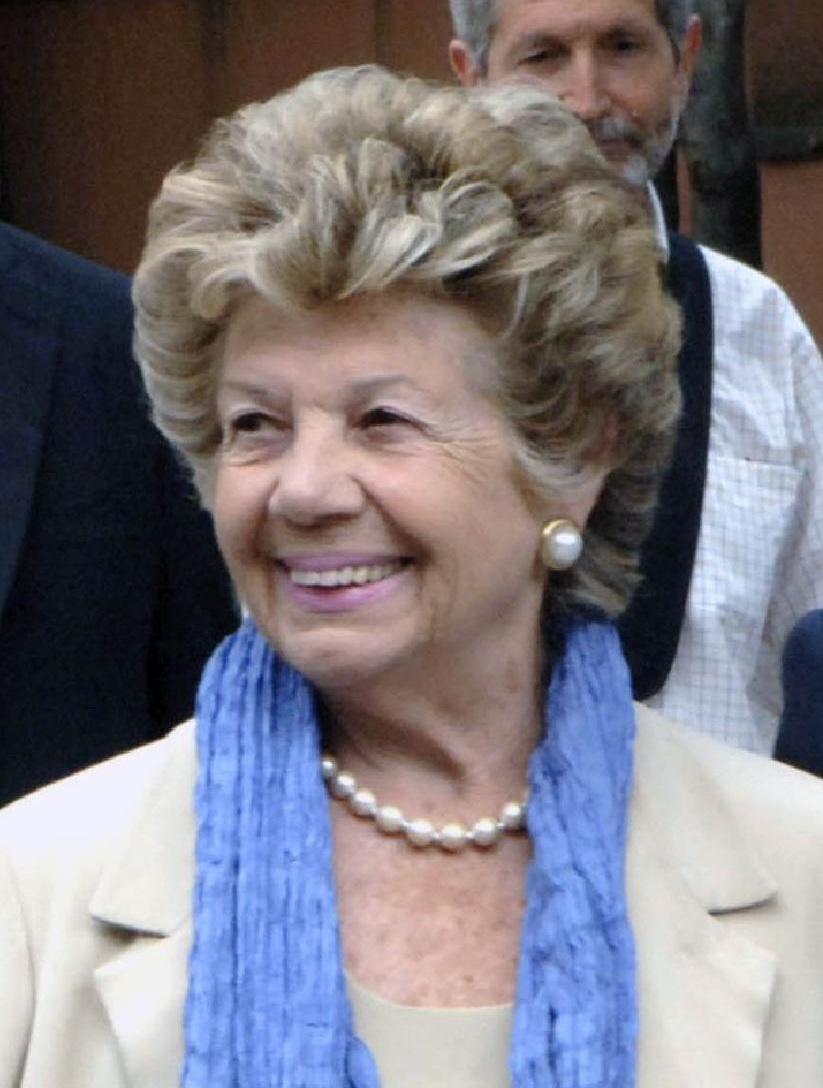
- Pilla in 2005

Companion of the President of Italy
- In role 18 May 1999 – 15 May 2006
- President: Carlo Azeglio Ciampi
- Preceded by: Marianna Scalfaro
- Succeeded by: Clio Maria Bittoni

Personal details
- Born: 18 December 1920 (age 105) Reggio Emilia, Emilia-Romagna, Kingdom of Italy
- Spouse: Carlo Azeglio Ciampi (m. 1946; died 2016)
- Children: 2
- Education: Scuola Normale Superiore
- Profession: Teacher

Franca Pilla (born 18 December 1920), sometimes known as Franca Ciampi, is an Italian teacher who served as the first lady of Italy from 1999 to 2006, as the wife of President Carlo Azeglio Ciampi. At 105 years old, she is currently the oldest living former first lady in the world.

== Biography ==
Franca Pilla was born in Reggio Emilia on 18 December 1920. At the age of 18, she met her future husband, Carlo Azeglio Ciampi, at the Scuola Normale Superiore in Pisa. They met at a "dancing tea" which at the time was a respectable way for youth to meet. The tea was organised by mothers, and boys and girls would be allowed to practise dancing with each other.

Following one year of engagement since the end of World War II, in which Ciampi had been a soldier and then a resistance fighter, Pilla married him in Bologna in 1946. They spent over seventy years together during which time her husband was prime minister, director and governor of Italy's central bank, minister of finance, and other positions, and later president; he died on 16 September 2016.

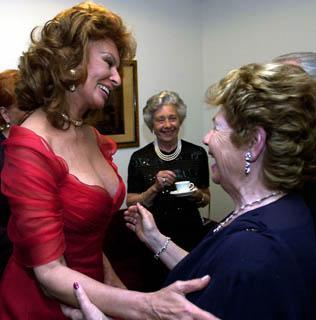
Pilla meeting actress Sophia Loren in 2001

During a tour of Naples, in the south of Italy, she was quoted as saying that the Italians in the South were kinder and more intelligent. She was known for her openness, giving the pope advice when they met and encouraging people to read and to ignore the TV.

Pilla turned 100 on 18 December 2020. As of 2026, at the age of 105, she is the oldest living former first lady in the world, following the death of Catherine M'ba, widow of Léon M'ba of Gabon, in November 2025.

== See also ==
- List of living centenarians
- List of centenarians (politicians and civil servants)
- Companion of the president of the Italian Republic

Unofficial roles
Preceded by Marianna Scalfaro; Acting	Companion of the President of Italy; 1999–2006	Succeeded by Clio Maria Bittoni
