= Death and state funeral of Giorgio Napolitano =

Death and funeral of Giorgio Napolitano
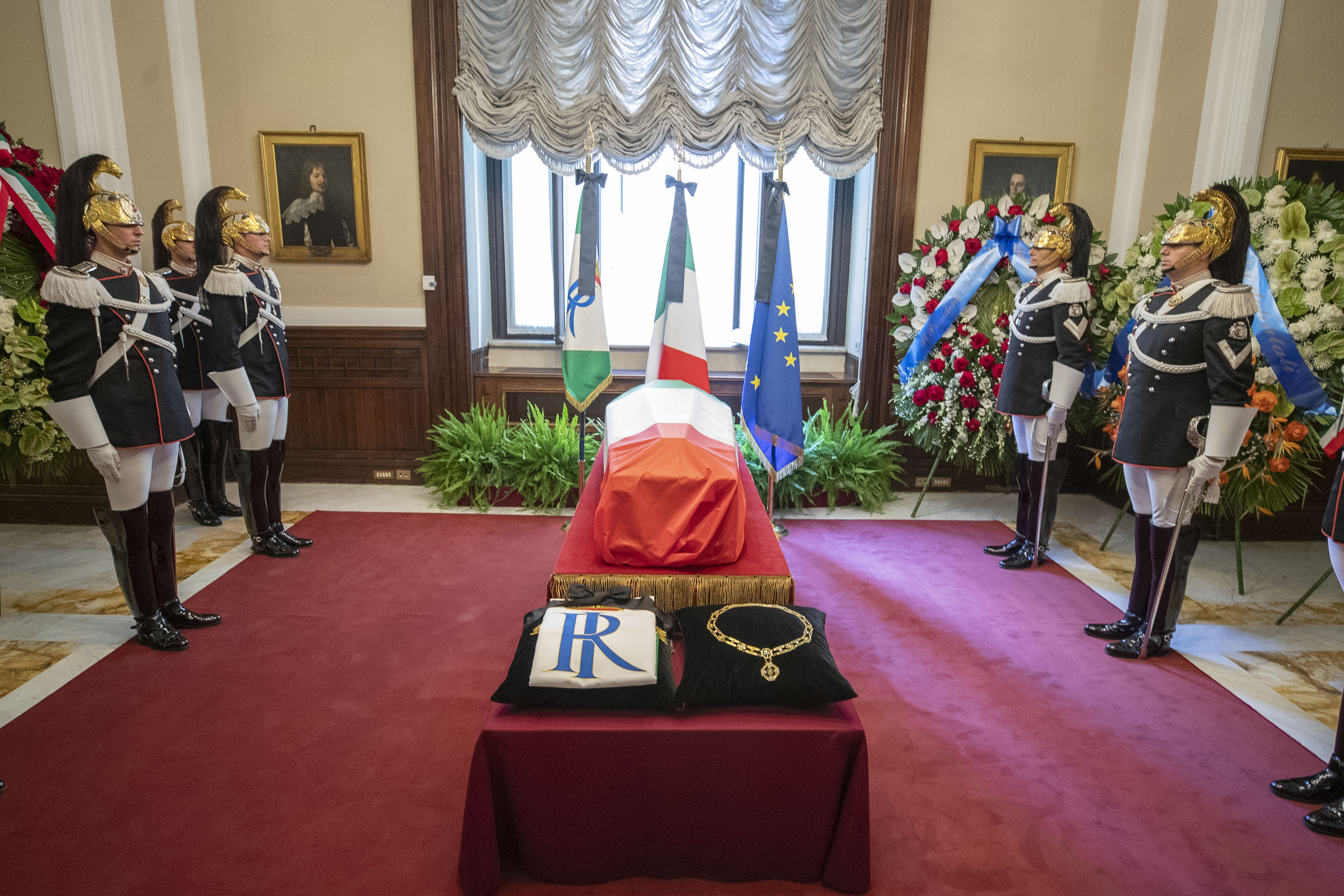
- Napolitano lying in state
- Date: 22 September 2023 (death); 26 September 2023 (funeral service)
- Venue: Palazzo Montecitorio
- Location: Rome, Italy
- Type: State funeral
- Burial: Cimitero Acattolico, Rome

On 22 September 2023, former Italian president Giorgio Napolitano died at the Salvator Mundi International Hospital in Rome, aged 98. On the following day, the Italian government announced a state funeral and proclaimed a national day of mourning for 26 September. It was attended by international figures including four incumbent presidents, one former president, and over one hundred ambassadors, and was Italy's first secular funeral for a former president. It was Italy's third state funeral in 2023 after former Prime Ministers Silvio Berlusconi's in June and Arnaldo Forlani's in July; it was also its third national mourning of the year after the death of victims of the Emilia-Romagna floods in May and the death of Silvio Berlusconi in June.

== Illness and death ==
Napolitano was hospitalized at the Salvator Mundi International Hospital in Rome shortly after his 98th birthday on 29 June 2023. On 19 September, he was reported to be in critical condition with his health deteriorating, and was taken off life support. He died three days later on 22 September.

== Lying in state ==
The day after his death, Napolitano's body was brought to Palazzo Madama, where the Italian Senate has its seat, and was laid in state for three days.

== Reactions ==
Prime Minister Giorgia Meloni offered her "deepest condolences" to Napolitano's family. President Sergio Mattarella said that Napolitano's life "mirrored a large part of (Italy's) history in the second half of the 20th century, with its dramas, its complexity, its goals, its hopes." In a condolence note to Clio Maria Bittoni, Napolitano's widow, Pope Francis said that Napolitano "showed great gifts of intellect and sincere passion for Italian political life as well as strong interest for the fates of nations." Napolitano had been in a friendly relationship with both Francis and his predecessor Pope Benedict XVI.

== Funeral ==
Italy's Council of Ministers ordered flags to be flown half-mast for five days in his honour until the date of the funeral, which was also proclaimed to be a day of national mourning; a state funeral was held on 26 September at Palazzo Montecitorio, where the Italian Chamber of Deputies has its seat. Since Napolitano identified as a non-believer, it was a secular funeral. He was buried in Rome's Non-Catholic Cemetery, near other historical figures like Antonio Gramsci, Andrea Camilleri, Emilio Lussu, Lindsay Kemp, Amelia Rosselli, John Keats, and Percy Bysshe Shelley.

Dignitaries who attended the funeral service included French President Emmanuel Macron, German President Frank-Walter Steinmeier, Cardinal Gianfranco Ravasi and Sophie, Duchess of Edinburgh. Pope Francis attended a wake for Napolitano at the Senate a day earlier on 25 September.
