= Fano-Urbino railway =

Fano–Urbino railway

Overview
- Other name: Metaurense
- Status: Closed
- Owner: Rete Ferroviaria Italiana
- Locale: Marche, Italy
- Termini: Fano; Urbino

Technical
- Track gauge: 1,435 mm (4 ft 8 1/2 in) standard gauge

The Fano–Urbino railway (Italian: Ferrovia Fano-Urbino) (also known as Metaurense) is a railway line in Italy of regional interest in Marche. It connects the Marche hinterland (Urbino) with the coast of the Adriatic Sea (Fano).

Since the early 21st century, the Ferrovia Valle Metauro Association has been fighting for the reopening of the line, working with its members to ensure the ordinary maintenance of the infrastructure.

== History ==
=== The arrival of the railway in Urbino ===
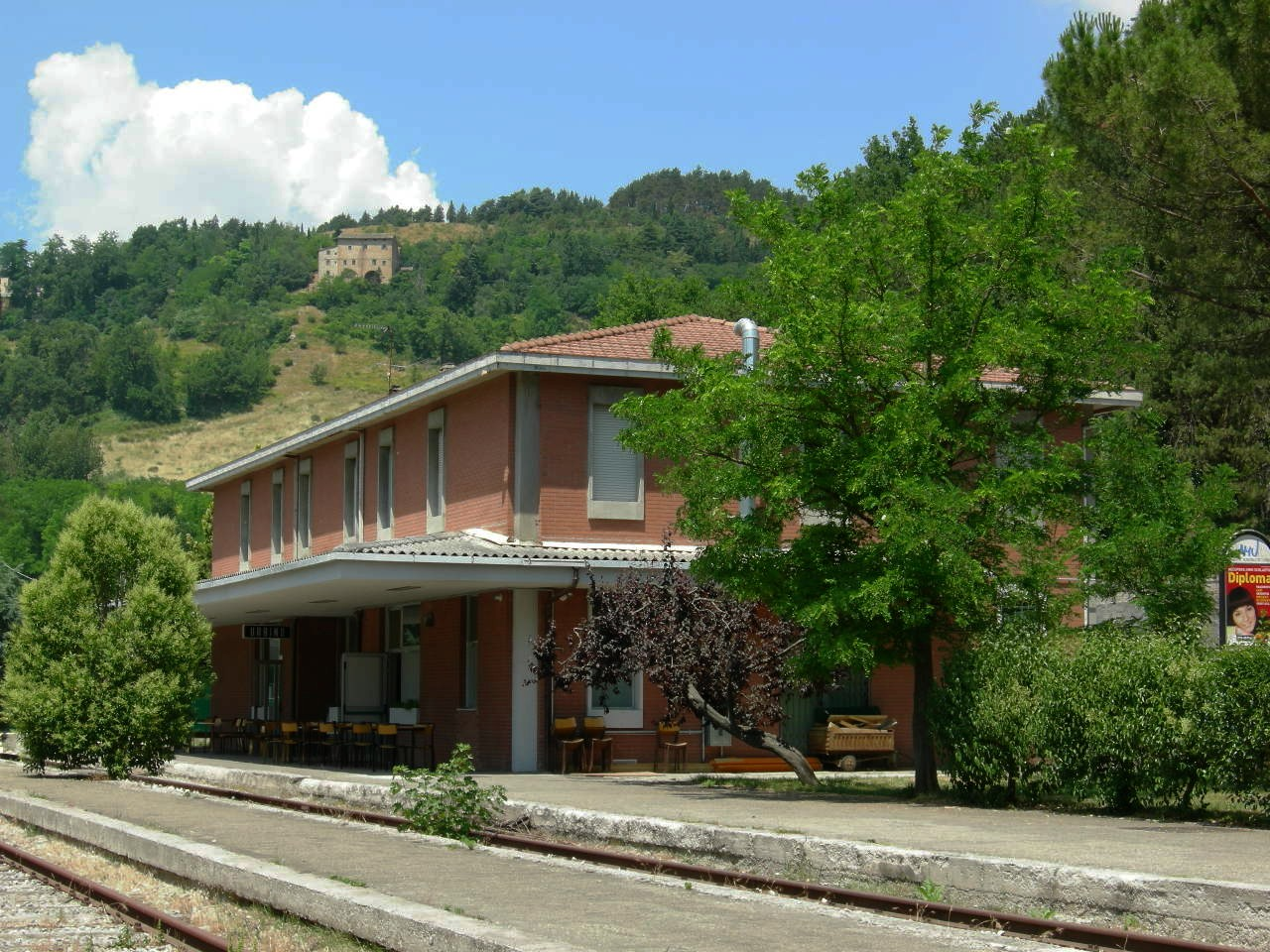
The Urbino station

This line, built by the Società per le Strade Ferrate Meridionali between Fabriano and Urbino, and partially built in the direction of Romagna, was never completed and in 1905 it passed to the Ferrovie dello Stato following the nationalization of the railways.

=== Closure and decommissioning ===
The last train was the regional 5662, operated with ALn 668-1935 of the Fabriano DL, and left Pesaro at 18:55 to arrive in Urbino at 20:00.
