= Ascoli Piceno railway station =

Railway station in Italy

Ascoli Piceno
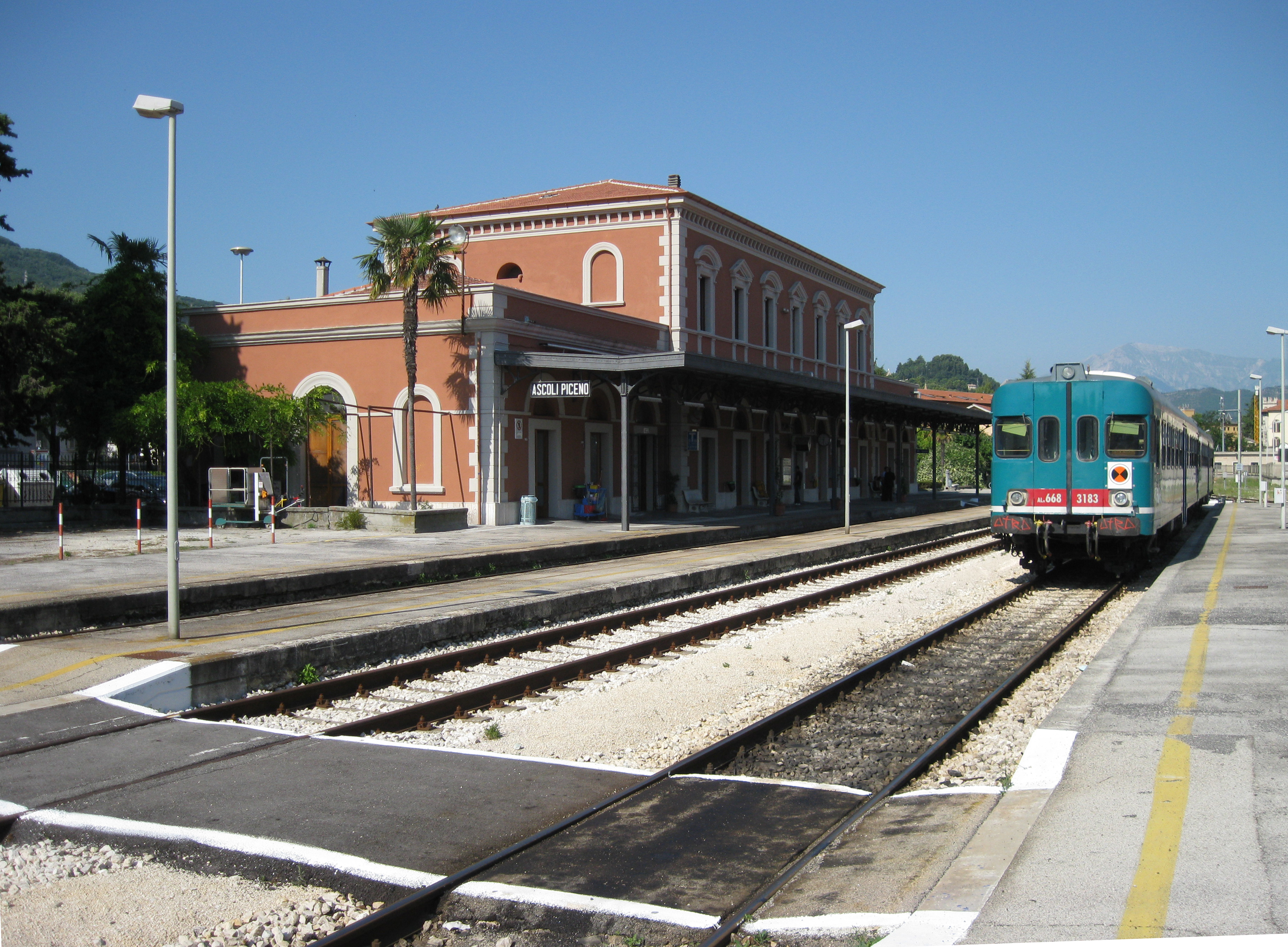

General information
- Location: Piazza della Stazione; 63100 Ascoli Piceno AP; Ascoli Piceno, Ascoli Piceno, Marche; Italy
- Coordinates: 42°51′19″N 13°35′17″E
- Operator: Rete Ferroviaria Italiana; Centostazioni
- Line: San Benedetto del Tronto–Ascoli Piceno
- Distance: 32.582 km (20.246 mi) from Porto d'Ascoli
- Train operators: Trenitalia
- Connections: Urban and suburban buses

Other information
- Classification: Silver

History
- Opened: 1 May 1886; 140 years ago
Location
- Location within Marche Location within Italy

Ascoli Piceno railway station (Italian: Stazione di Ascoli Piceno) serves the town and comune of Ascoli Piceno, in the region of Marche, central Italy. Opened in 1886, it is the southwestern terminus of the San Benedetto del Tronto–Ascoli Piceno railway, a branch of the Adriatic railway.

The station is managed by Rete Ferroviaria Italiana (RFI). The commercial area of the passenger building is managed by Centostazioni. Train services are operated by Trenitalia. Each of these companies is a subsidiary of Ferrovie dello Stato (FS), Italy's state-owned rail company.

== Location ==
Ascoli Piceno railway station is situated at Piazza della Stazione, to the east of the town centre.

== History ==
The station was opened on 1 May 1886, together with the rest of the San Benedetto del Tronto–Ascoli Piceno railway.

The original operator of the station was the Società per le Strade Ferrate Meridionali (SFM) (English: Company for the Southern Railways), which operated the whole of the Ascoli Piceno branch as part of the Rete Adriatica (English: Adriatic Network). The SFM continued to operate the branch until the nationalization of the Italian railways in 1905.

== Features ==
=== Passenger Building ===
Ascoli Piceno's passenger building is a two-storey structure, comprising three sections. It is made of brick and painted brown.

The central section of the building has six mullioned windows topped by arches, and its first floor windows are decorated with cornices. The ground floor of that section houses services for passengers, but the first floor is not accessible to the public.

Extending laterally from the central section are two symmetrical single-storey wings.

=== Station yard ===
The station yard consists of three tracks dedicated to passenger transport. In detail:

- Track 1: is a siding track.
- Track 2: lines up directly with the running track.
- Track 3: is another siding track.

The tracks are all passing tracks, because although the station is the terminal, each track ends about 50 metres (160 ft) outside the station. All tracks have a platform, and are connected by a concrete walkway. Only one track is covered by a canopy, which is made of wrought iron.

The station yard is also equipped with a group of sidings dedicated to the storage of vehicles not in service. These sidings are connected with the platforms by a bridge. There is a locomotive shed, and a goods shed of a design typical to Italian railway stations. The former goods yard has been dismantled, and the goods shed is disused.

From the station yard, a number of spur lines extend to nearby industrial sidings. Some of these spur lines are made partially of tramway tracks, at points where the line previously intersected with asphalt covered roadway.

== Train movements ==
Only regional trains stop at the station. Their main origins and destinations are San Benedetto del Tronto, Civitanova Marche and Ancona.

== Interchange ==
In the square in front of the passenger building is a bus terminal for urban and suburban buses. The operator of the bus service is START.

== See also ==
- History of rail transport in Italy
- List of railway stations in the Marche
- Rail transport in Italy
- Railway stations in Italy
