= Monsano =

- Comune
- Comune di Monsano
- Coat of arms

- Location within Italy Location within Marche
- Coordinates: 43°34′N 13°15′E
- Country: Italy
- Region: Marche
- Province: Ancona (AN)
- Frazioni: Santa Maria

Government
  - Mayor: Gianpaolo Casci

Area
  - Total: 14.3 km^{2} (5.5 sq mi)
- Elevation: 191 m (627 ft)

Population (31 December 2010)
  - Total: 2,881
  - Density: 201/km^{2} (522/sq mi)
- Demonym: Monsanesi
- Time zone: UTC+1 (CET)
  - Summer (DST): UTC+2 (CEST)
- Postal code: 60030
- Dialing code: 0731
- Website: Official website

Monsano is a comune (municipality) in the Province of Ancona in the Italian region Marche, located about 20 kilometres (12 mi) west of Ancona.

Monsano borders the following municipalities: Jesi, Monte San Vito, San Marcello.
