= Monte San Vito =

- Comune
- Comune di Monte San Vito
- Coat of arms

- Location within Italy Location within Marche
- Coordinates: 43°36′N 13°16′E
- Country: Italy
- Region: Marche
- Province: Ancona (AN)
- Frazioni: Borghetto, Le Cozze, Santa Lucia

Government
  - Mayor: Thomas Cillo

Area
  - Total: 21.6 km^{2} (8.3 sq mi)
- Elevation: 137 m (449 ft)

Population (28 February 2009)
  - Total: 6,544
  - Density: 303/km^{2} (785/sq mi)
- Demonym: Monsanvitesi
- Time zone: UTC+1 (CET)
  - Summer (DST): UTC+2 (CEST)
- Postal code: 60037
- Dialing code: 071
- Website: Official website

Monte San Vito is a comune (municipality) in the Province of Ancona in the Italian region Marche, located about 20 kilometres (12 mi) west of Ancona, in the lower Esino valley.

Monte San Vito borders the following municipalities: Chiaravalle, Jesi, Monsano, Montemarciano, Morro d'Alba, San Marcello, Senigallia.
