= Montemarciano =

- Comune
- Comune di Montemarciano
- Coat of arms

- Location within Italy Location within Marche
- Coordinates: 43°38′N 13°19′E
- Country: Italy
- Region: Marche
- Province: Ancona (AN)
- Frazioni: Alberici, Cassiano, Gabella, Gelso, Grugnaletto, Forcella, Marcianella, Marina

Government
  - Mayor: Liana Serrani

Area
  - Total: 22.1 km^{2} (8.5 sq mi)
- Elevation: 92 m (302 ft)

Population (31 August 2008)
  - Total: 10,233
  - Density: 463/km^{2} (1,200/sq mi)
- Demonym: Montemarcianesi
- Time zone: UTC+1 (CET)
  - Summer (DST): UTC+2 (CEST)
- Postal code: 60018
- Dialing code: 071
- Website: Official website

Montemarciano is a comune (municipality) in the Province of Ancona in the Italian region Marche, about 15 kilometres (9 mi) west of Ancona.

Montemarciano borders Chiaravalle, Falconara Marittima, Monte San Vito, and Senigallia.

== Twin towns and sister cities ==
Montemarciano is twinned with:

- Sinj, Croatia
- Quincy-sous-Sénart, France
- Höhenkirchen-Siegertsbrunn, Germany
- Bardejov, Slovakia
- Saue, Estonia
