= Chiaravalle, Marche =

Chiaravalle
- Comune
- Comune di Chiaravalle
- Location within Italy Location within Marche
- Coordinates: 43°36′N 13°20′E
- Country: Italy
- Region: Marche
- Province: Province of Ancona (AN)
- Frazioni: Grancetta

Area
  - Total: 17.4 km^{2} (6.7 sq mi)
- Elevation: 22 m (72 ft)

Population (Dec. 2004)
  - Total: 14,397
  - Density: 827/km^{2} (2,140/sq mi)
- Demonym: Chiaravallesi
- Time zone: UTC+1 (CET)
  - Summer (DST): UTC+2 (CEST)
- Postal code: 60033
- Dialing code: 071
- Website: Official website

Chiaravalle (Italian pronunciation: [kjaraˈvalle]) is a comune (municipality) in the Province of Ancona in the Italian region of Marche, located about 15 kilometres (9 mi) west of Ancona. As of 31 December 2004, it had a population of 14,397 and an area of 17.4 square kilometres (6.7 mi^{2}).

The municipality of Chiaravalle contains the frazione (borough or locality) of Grancetta. It borders the following municipalities: Camerata Picena, Falconara Marittima, Jesi, Monte San Vito, Montemarciano.

== Demographic evolution ==
Historical population

Year	Pop.	±%
1861	4,064	—
1871	4,619	+13.7%
1881	5,321	+15.2%
1901	5,833	+9.6%
1911	6,366	+9.1%

Year	Pop.	±%
1921	6,302	−1.0%
1931	6,764	+7.3%
1936	6,915	+2.2%
1951	7,991	+15.6%
1961	9,619	+20.4%

Year	Pop.	±%
1971	11,863	+23.3%
1981	13,318	+12.3%
1991	13,813	+3.7%
2001	14,040	+1.6%
2011	14,858	+5.8%

Source: Data from ISTAT

== Notable people ==
- Maria Montessori (1870–1952), physician and educator
- Clio Maria Bittoni (1934–2024), jurist and First Lady of Italy 2006–2015
- Sofia Raffaeli (born 2004), rhythmic gymnast
