= Teatro Pergolesi =

Coordinates: 43.5219°N 13.2439°E

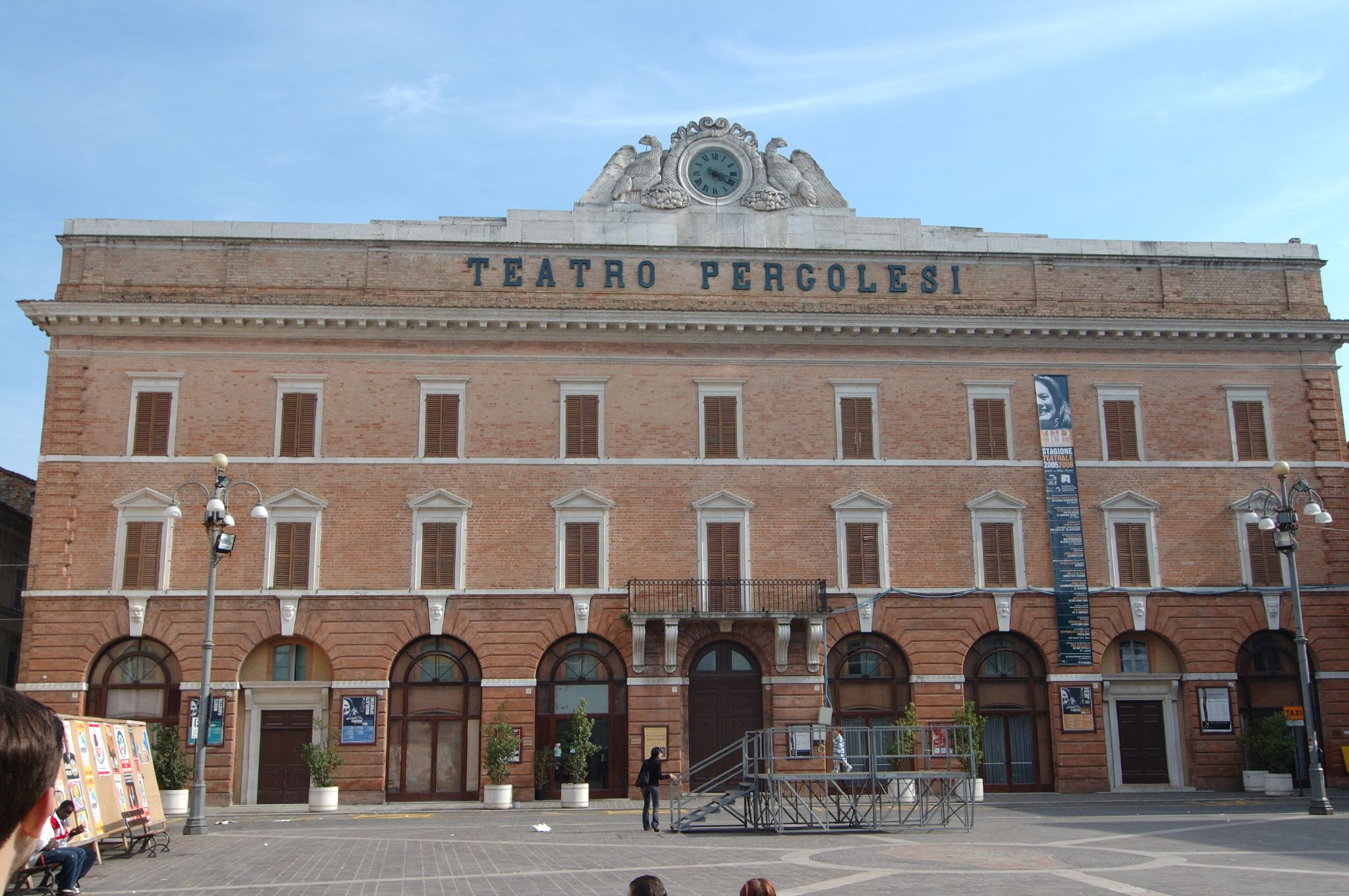
Facade of the Teatro Pergolesi

The Teatro Comunale Pergolesi is an opera house in Jesi, Italy. It was originally named the Teatro della Concordia when it was the rival to the original 1732 opera house in the city, the Teatro del Leone. That theatre was active until 1791, but it was destroyed by fire in 1792.

The concept of the Concordia began in 1790 with a request to the city government to allow construction of a new opera house on the Plaza della Morte (now the Plaza della Republica), an area in need of re-development and revival. The city agreed on the basis of holding two boxes for itself and, with some interruptions for a variety of reasons, completion was achieved in time for the opening during the Carnival of 1798 with Portogallo's Lo spazzacamino principe. The house consisted of four tiers of boxes, 100 in total, all sold to wealthy subscribers.

Modifications took place in 1835 to create a gallery by removing the fourth tier of boxes and creating a better entrance to the orchestra level. The 170th anniversary of the composer local-born composer Giovanni Battista Pergolesi caused the renaming in his honour, although as is noted, it took a further three years for this to come into effect.

By 1925 the need for repairs had grown acute and the surviving heirs of the original construction, the Società Teatrale, were unable to continue to support the theatre, which in March 1929 was acquired by the city.

The theatre is still in use today, "one of the few opera houses in Italy from the late 1700s that has never been destroyed by fire or bombs". It was completely renovated in 1995 and is currently managed by the Pergolesi Spontini Foundation.
