= Amedeo M. Turello =

- Born: Amedeo Maria Turello; 13 January 1964 (age 62); Cuneo, Italy
- Education: Polytechnic University of Turin (Master of Architecture)
- Occupations: Photographer; art director; exhibition curator; art collector
- Years active: 1999–present
- Known for: Fashion and luxury photography; Curatorial work at St. Moritz Art Masters; Pirelli Calendar exhibitions; Official engagement portrait of Albert II, Prince of Monaco
- Awards: Order of Cultural Merit (Principality of Monaco)

Amedeo M. Turello (born Amedeo Maria Turello on 13 January 1964 in Cuneo, Italy) is an Italian photographer, art director, exhibition curator, and art collector working primarily in the fields of luxury, fashion, and culture.

== Biography ==
Turello comes from a family with a long tradition in classical furniture manufacturing, being the third generation involved in the family business. After pursuing studies in the arts, he earned a master's degree in architecture from the Polytechnic University of Turin (Politecnico di Torino). In 1990, he relocated to Monte Carlo, where he founded International Promotion, a company specialising in visual communication and industrial design.

=== Photography career ===
In 1996, Turello became editor and art director of the magazine Society, before going on to launch his own publication, Style Monte-Carlo. The latter was sold in 2009 to a South Korean media group.

He began his photography career in 1999. In 2001, he completed his first significant project in collaboration with renowned stylist Aldo Coppola, producing the artbook The Regal Barock for L'Oréal, a limited edition of 500 copies featuring models Martina Klein, Nadia El Dassouki, Rika Girth, and Rosemarie Wetzel.

Over the course of his career he has photographed numerous public figures, including Mikhail Baryshnikov, Ana Beatriz Barros, Naomi Campbell, Kevin Costner, Carmen Dell'Orefice, Brooklyn Decker, Eva Herzigova, Irina Shayk, Kiera Chaplin, Erin O'Connor, Carré Otis, Tatjana Patitz, Sylvester Stallone, Fernanda Tavares, and Dita Von Teese. His commercial work includes collaborations with fashion houses and brands such as Roberto Cavalli, Alessandro Dell'Acqua, Dolce & Gabbana, Tommy Hilfiger, Antonio Marras, Elie Saab, and Ermanno Scervino. In 2009, Turello photographed the Diva calendar for the Lambertz confectionery brand, featuring models including Natalia Belova, Mariana Braga, Anna Chyzh, Rosanna Davison, Nanda Hampe, Ingrida Kraus, Noémie Lenoir, Pavlina Nemcova, Sara Nuru, Alice Rausch, Ruth Raja, Shermine Shahrivar, and Aymeline Valade.

In 2010, Turello created the official engagement portrait of Prince Albert II of Monaco and Charlene Wittstock.

=== Exhibitions ===
Turello's first solo exhibition, 10 Years Celebrating Women, took place in 2009 at the Palazzo Pichi Sforza in Sansepolcro. Subsequent exhibitions include showings at the Boghossian Foundation, Villa Empain in Brussels (2011), the Nira Alpina gallery in St. Moritz (2012 and 2013), and the 10×10 exhibition organised by Leica Camera in Wetzlar for the brand's centenary in 2014. He also exhibited at the Photo Vogue Festival at the Robilant Voena Gallery in Milan in 2017, and at the 29 Art in Progress Gallery in 2018.

In 2019, Turello held a major retrospective exhibition titled Ritratti e Paesaggi in Monte Carlo, in collaboration with the Dante Alighieri Monaco association. The show featured 300 large-format works — including 100 landscapes and 200 portraits — marking 20 years of his photographic career. That same year he exhibited work in the Rock'n'Roll is a State of the Soul exhibition at the Palazzo del Duca and Palazzo Baviera in Senigallia. In 2023, he presented work at the Villa Ciani in Lugano as part of the first Swiss edition of the Summer Jamboree.

=== Curatorial work ===
From 2008 to 2014, Turello served as curator of the St. Moritz Art Masters in Switzerland. From 2015 onward, he curated exhibitions related to the Pirelli Calendar across Europe, the United States, and South America.

His ongoing curatorial project Mirrors of the Magic Muse, launched in 2010, comprises a series of exhibitions focused on female representation in photography. Within this framework, he participated in the exhibition Nice 2013 – A Summer for Matisse at the Théâtre de la Photographie et de l'Image in Nice, in which his collection of female portraiture was presented alongside the work of Henri Matisse.

== Publications ==
- The Regal Barock (2001), with Aldo Coppola. ArtBook for L'Oréal. Limited edition of 500 copies.
- L'Occhio Italiano di Piero Ceppi (2006). ASIN B06Y5CD8SX.
- 10 Years Celebrating Women (2009), curated by Giuliana Scimé. Contributing authors include Paulo Coelho, Giusi Ferré, Lou Mollgaard, and Cara Weston. ISBN 978-2-9535139-0-5.
- Mirrors of the Magic Muse (2013), text by Maurizio Rebuzzini. Contributing authors include Eliseo Barbara, Irina Chmyreva, and Giuliana Scimé. ISBN 978-2-9535139-1-2.
- The Cal. Collezione Pirelli – Forma e Desiderio (2014), with Walter Guadagnini. ISBN 978-8809808102.
- Eternal Beauty: Over 50 Years of the Pirelli Calendar (2018), with Walter Guadagnini. ISBN 8836639097.
- The Naked Soul (2019). ArtBook and calendar produced for the Albert II Foundation.
- Ritratti & Paesaggi – L'Italia sul palcoscenico (2019), curated by Walter Guadagnini. ISBN 978-8836644971.
- L'Eterna Bellezza – De la Colección del Calendario Pirelli (2023), with Julio Hirsch-Hardy. Fotonostrum Barcelona.

== Honours ==
Order of Cultural Merit — Principality of Monaco
