= Ladyvette =

- Origin: Italy
- Genres: 1950s style Italian music band
- Years active: 2012–present
- Labels: Rai Com; Ladyvette
- Members: Teresa Federico (Sugar); Valentina Ruggeri (Pepper); Francesca Nerozzi (Honey)
- Past members: Vera Dragone (Cherry)
- Website: www.ladyvette.it

Ladyvette is a 1950s style Italian music band. It is formed by three actresses and singers: Sugar (Teresa Federico), Pepper (Valentina Ruggeri) and Honey (Francesca Nerozzi). Teresa Federico is also the author of all the original songs’ lyrics and of some of the scores together with Roberto Gori., who is responsible for arrangements and original compositions. Roberto Gori is a pianist and composer, winner of the “Disco D’oro” award in 1996 and the “Nino Rota” award in 2016. Since the very beginning Ladyvette are accompanied, in addition to Roberto Gori at the piano, by Riccardo Colasante (drums), Alberto Antonucci (doublebass) and Gian Piero Lo Piccolo (sax and clarinet). Ladyvette is a swing band who combines vocal activities with comedy, both in original and in reinterpreted songs, and in their sketches.

== History ==
In 2012 Valentina Ruggeri had the idea of forming the band. Since the very beginning her idea was to put together swing music and women’s world. She immediately include in the group Teresa Federico and Vera Dragone, both of them being actresses and singers. Valentina Ruggeri had the initial idea of rearranging well known italian pop music hits from the 80s and 90s (such as Marco Masini, Max Pezzali, Ambra Angiolini...) with a swing mood. It was Teresa Federico’s idea to involve Roberto Gori in the project. He is both a composer and an arranger, therefore, with his help, Ladyvette started editing their first original songs, facing women’s role in different social contexts. Their first single “Tapa Tapa” plays around obsession of women on body hairs. First step the Ladyvette’s swoop to Festival del Cinema in Venice happened only two months after the group was formed where the three actresses pretended to be three well known divas: invited by Matteo Garrone to the opening gala of the festival. From the very beginning they proposed themselves on the Italian music scene as singers, but also as authors and entertainers. Their first concert was held in December at the Micca Club, in Rome. In 2014 Ladyvette started a partnership with stylist Vivien of Holloway, who was their official stylist until 2016.

From 2014 they performed in many jazz clubs in Rome, such as Cotton Club, Casa del Jazz and Alexander Platz, but also at the Libreria del Cinema, as a partnership with director Giuseppe Piccioni, at the Kino and at the Roma Vintage Festival. In June 2013, they were invited to the Summer Jamboree festival in Senigallia, Italy.

=== Team change ===
In 2016 after four years of collaboration, Vera Dragone (Cherry) was replaced by Francesca Nerozzi (Honey). As a new member of the trio, Francesca has brought new motivations and thanks also to her experience as a former classic dancer, she focused her job on the trio’s choreographies.

=== From television to cinema to theatre ===
After two years of live music, Ladyvette meets Gigi Marzullo and Renzo Arbore introducing to them Ladyvette’s project. Within a few weeks, the trio becomes regular guest of “Settenote”, Gigi Marzullo’s late show on music, aired by RaiUno.

In 2014 that same year, they also shot as main characters a commercial for Algida, directed by D. Gentile and they participated to the shooting of the film “Radio Cortile”, directed by F. Bonelli. In the same year casting director Claudia Marotti shows some of Ladyvette’s videos to television director Monica Vullo. In 2015 director Monica Vullo cast them as actresses and singers in the television series “Il Paradiso delle Signore” (Produced by Aurora Film, Rai Uno). Then, in 2016, their television activity continued, with appearances in the first season of the TV series is “Il Paradiso delle Signore”, where they also work at part of the original soundtrack edited by Rai Com, winner of Colonne Sonore Prize 2016 as best soundtrack of a television show. That same year they also participated to many television shows like Telethon, Affari Tuoi, Uno Mattina, all aired by Rai Uno. They also appeared in Renzo Arbore’s show “Quelli dello Swing”, aired by Rai Due, with Gege’ Telesforo, Piji Siciliani, Max Paiella, Lillo & Greg. In particular they start a collaboration with Lillo Petrolo helping Teresa Federico writing a theatre show named “Le Dive dello Swing”, staged at Brancaccino Theatre, in Rome, directed by Massimiliano Vado with artistic direction of Lillo Petrolo. This artistic and personal friendship also ends up in Lillo Petrolo special appearance in Ladyvette’s single “Tutti quanti voglion fare swing”, featuring Lillo Petrolo showing Lindy Hop dancers'style adopted in Italy.

=== International concerts ===
In October 2014, they performed at the Ronnie Scott’s Bar in London followed by a short tour in the UK. In 2015 they were invited to perform at the Dolce Vita Festival, Rovigno, Croatia alongside Mike Sanchez. In October 2015 Ladyvette flew overseas for a tour of New York USA, where they performed at Joe’s Pub with Chiara Civello, at Casa Italiana Zerilli/Merimo’ and at Birdland. In the winter of 2016 they performed at the Capri Hollywood International Film Festival alongside Helen Mirren.

=== Charity ===
Since 2015 the trio participates to events organized by charitable onlus such as Children for peace alongside Anastasia, ANLAIDS, the charitable campaign “Jumper day” by Save the Children. They also played at the charity event in memoriam of Marta Marzotto at Metropole Hotel in Venice.

== Band members ==
Current

- Teresa Federico (Sugar) – lead vocals (2012–present)
- Valentina Ruggeri (Pepper) – lead vocals (2012–present)

Francesca Nerozzi (Honey) – lead vocals (2016–present)

Former

- Vera Dragone (Cherry) – lead vocals (2012–2016)

=== Performances Chronology ===
Concerts
Where	Place	Year	Notes
Micca Club	Rome, Italy	2014	
Cotton Club	Rome, Italy	2014	
Casa del Jazz	Rome, Italy	2014	
Alexander Platz	Rome, Italy	2014	
Summer Jamboree	Senigallia, Italy	2014	
Libreria del cinema	Rome, Italy	2014	as a partnership with the famous italian director Giuseppe Piccioni
Kino	Rome, Italy	2014	
Roma Vintage Festival	Rome, Italy	2014	
Ronnie Scott’s Bar	London, UK	2014	followed by a short tour in the UK
Vinile	Rome, Italy	2014	
Bravo Caffè	Bologna, Italy	2015	
Salone Margherita	Rome, Italy	2015	
Dolce Vita Festival	Rovigno, Croatia	2015	alongside Mike San chez
	New York, USA	2015	at Joe’s Pub with Chiara Civello, at Casa Italiana Zerilli Merimo’ and at Birdland
Capodanno X-Factor	Cosenza, Italy	2015	alongside Shorty, Gio Sada, Mosick
Bulgari launch	Rome, Italy	2016	
Hotel Metropole	Venice, Italy	2016	Charity event for Marta Marzotto
Children for peace	Rome, Italy	2016	supporting ANLAIDS
Hotel Metropole	Venice, Italy	2016	New Year's Day
Spirit de Milan	Milan, Italy	2017	
Quirinetta	Rome, Italy	2017	
Evento Millemiglia	Rome, Italy	2017	in honor of the Marzotto family

Theatre
Title	Location	Place	Year	Notes
Ladyvette live show	Teatro degli Arrischianti	Sarteano, Italy	2017	
Le Dive dello Swing	Teatro Brancaccino	Rome, Italy	2017	artistic direction by di Lillo Petrolo, directed by Massimiliano Vado, produced by Bis Tremila

Cinema, television and radio
Title	Author	Broadcast	Year	Notes
Spot Algida	Davide Gentile		2014	
Settenote	Gigi Marzullo	Rai Uno	2014	regular guests
Stai Serena	Serena Dandini	Radio Due	2015	guests
Il Paradiso delle Signore	Monica Vullo	Produced by Aurora TV, Rai Uno	2015	TV series: cast as actresses and singers
Radio Cortile	Francesco Bonelli		2016	movie
Splendor		Iris	2016	TV show
Ladies and Capital		Radio Capital	2017	interview
Il Paradiso delle Signore 2		Rai Uno	2017	
9 lune e mezzo	M. Andreozzi	Paco Cinematografica	2017	Movie. Cast as actresses and singers

==== Awards ====
2016. "Il Paradiso delle Signore". Mention of Sound Column Margutta Award.

2017. Margutta Award for the music category.

2017. Best Hair Nomination. Bokeh South Africa International Fashion Film Festival.
