= Mattathiah Nissim Terni =

Mattathiah Nissim ben Jacob Israel Terni (Hebrew: מתתיה נסים בן יעקב ישראל טירני; fl. 18th–19th centuries) was an Italian rabbi and poet. He served as a rabbi in Florence, Urbino, Pesaro, and Sinigaglia.

Among his notable works are Sefat Emet (Leghorn, 1797), a compilation of halakhic decisions; Midbar ba-'Aravah (Florence, 1807?), on marriage laws; and Midbar Mattanah (1810), a collection of responsa in four parts, with an appendix in Italian. He also wrote a volume of poems entitled No'am ve-Ḥovelim ve-Derekh Emunah.
