= Foro Annonario, Senigallia =

Building in Senigallia, Province of Ancona, Italy

Foro Annonario
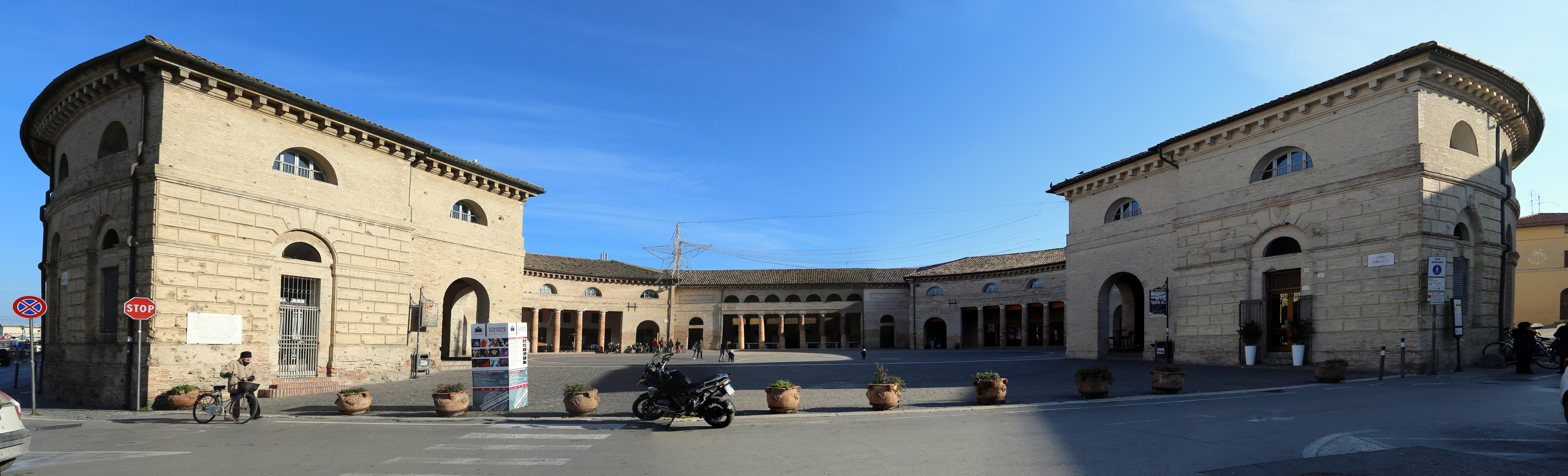
- Interactive map of Foro Annonario
- Addresses: Senigallia
- Postal code: 60019

Other
- Designer: Pietro Ghinelli

The Foro Annonario of Senigallia, Italy, is an important historical building in the city.

== History and description ==
The Foro Annonario of Senigallia it’s near the Misa river and piazza Roma, in the town centre. The structure has been designed by the architect Pietro Ghinelli in 1834; the Foro is built in neoclassical style with 24 columns in Doric style that compose an arcade. The structure is built of bricks. Above the arcade, there are the local library and archive. The Foro was used for the fish sale and the farmers’ market.

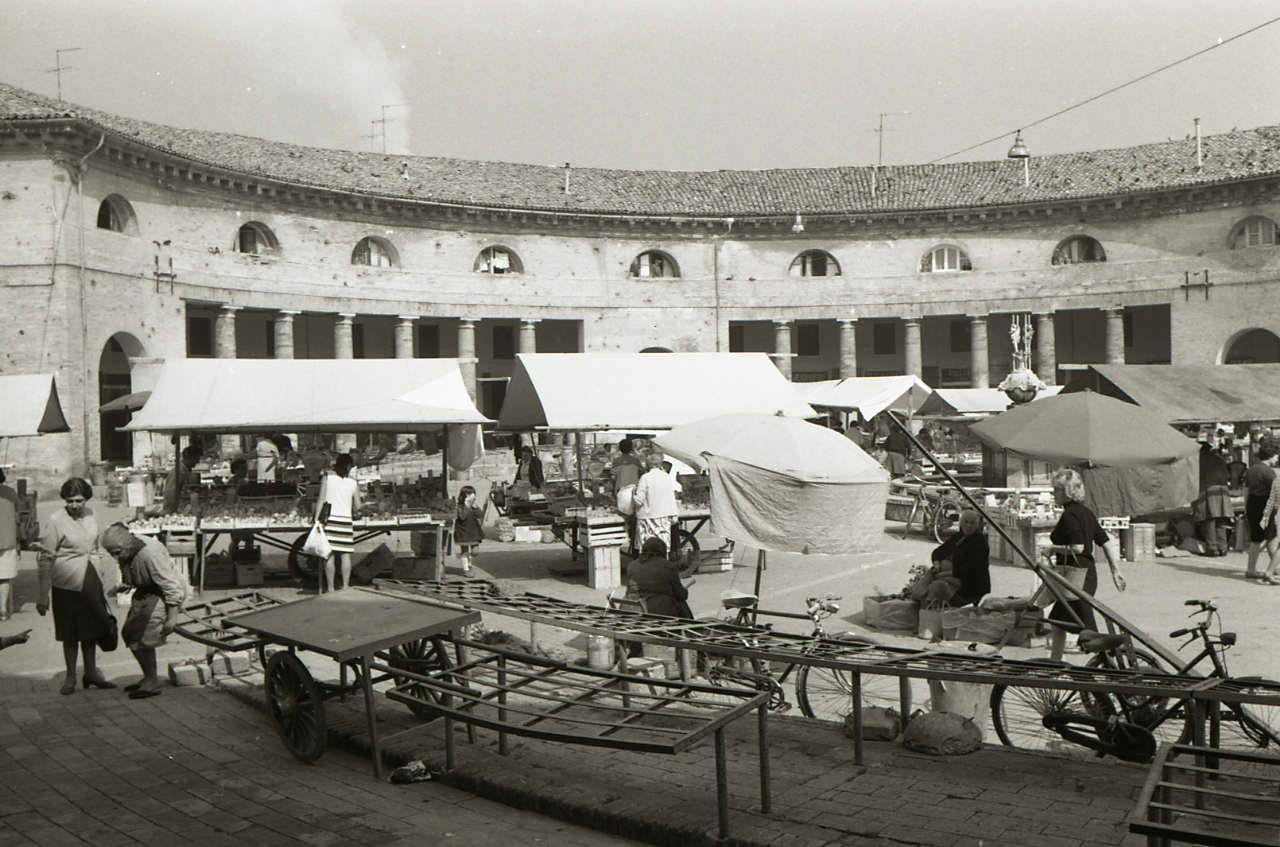
Market in the Foro Annonario in 1969, photo by Paolo Monti

== Bibliography ==
- Various authors, Marche, Abruzzo e Molise, Milano, De Agostini, 2001, ISBN 88-7045-219-0.
