= Spirito Santo Banner =

C. 1494 paintings by Luca Signorelli

The Santo Spirito Banner (Italian - Gonfalone dello Spirito Santo) is a double-sided 1494 tempera on canvas painting by Luca Signorelli, now in the Galleria nazionale delle Marche in Urbino. Separated in 1775, one side shows the Crucifixion of Jesus and the other Pentecost.

It was painted for Urbino's Confraternita dello Spirito Santo to carry in public processions. At this period the painter had taken refuge in Urbino after fleeing Florence following the fall of the Medici. The contract for the work was signed in Cortona by the maiolica painter Filippo Gueroli, who may have been Signorelli's agent in Urbino. The contract set the payment at 20 florins and the deadline four months later.

== Gallery ==
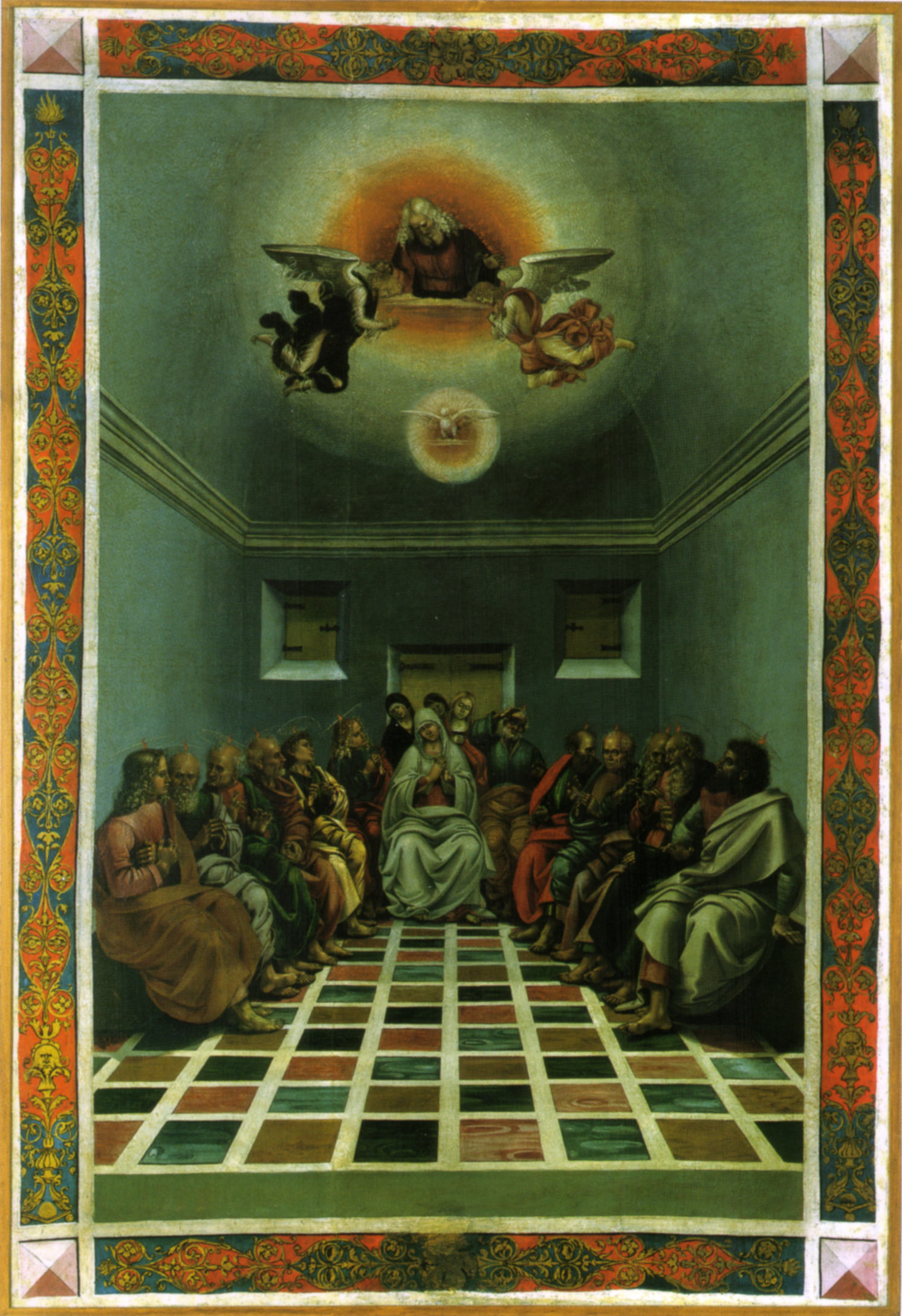
Pentecost

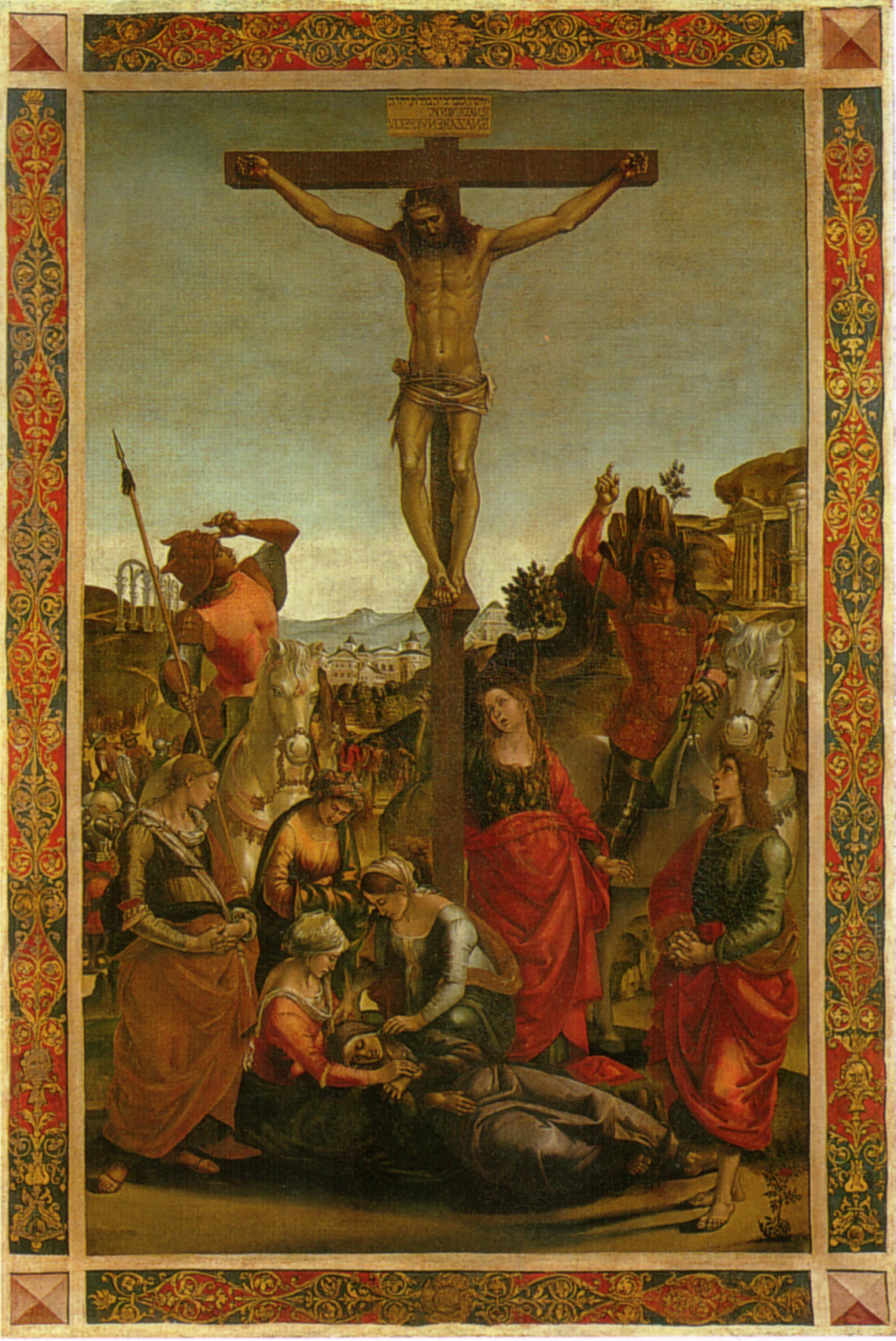
Crucifixion
