= Santa Maria delle Grazie, Senigallia =

Church building in Senigallia, Italy

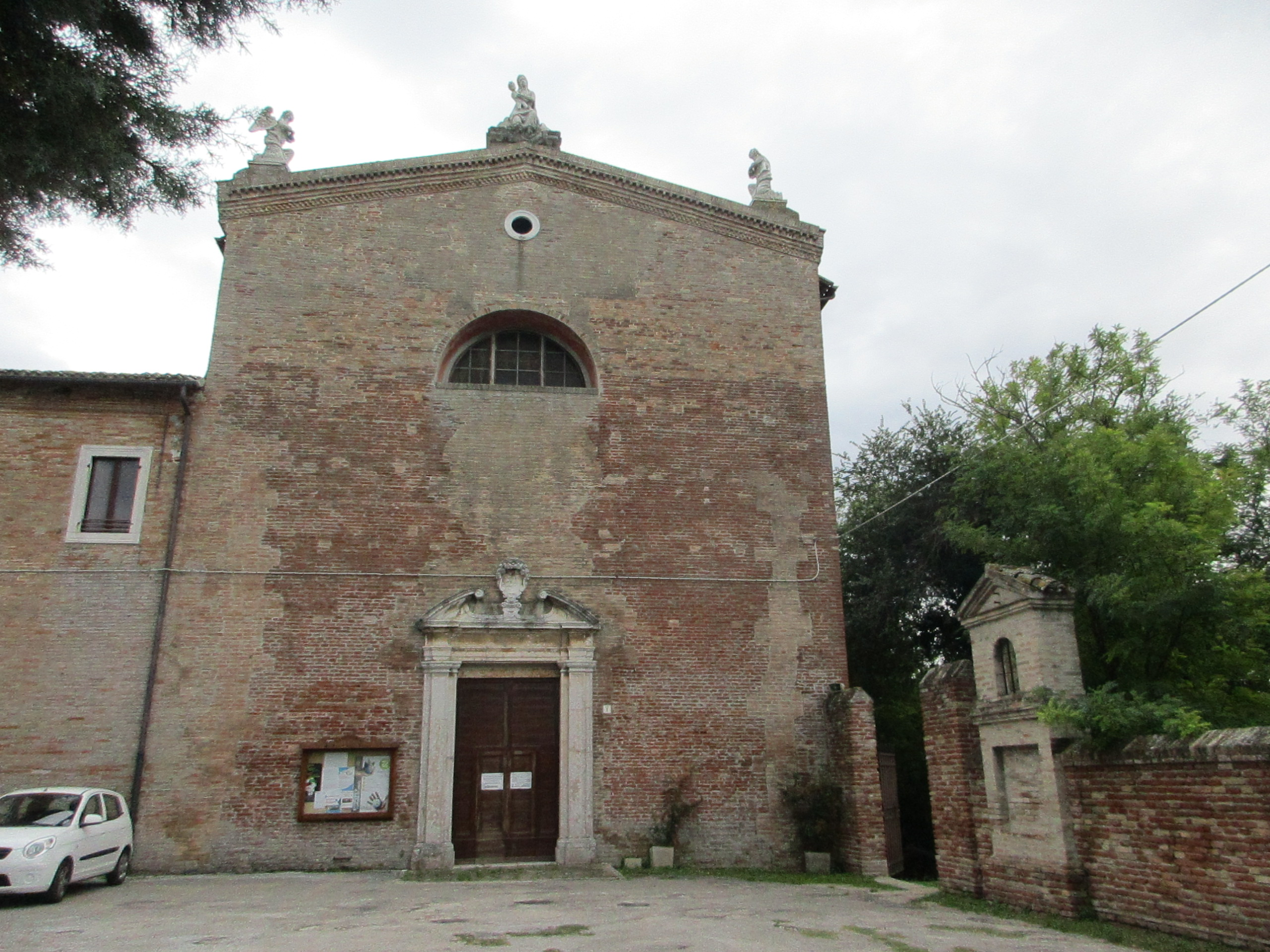
Senigallia Chiesa delle Grazie 1.jpg

Santa Maria delle Grazie is a 17th-century Baroque-style, Roman Catholic church and convent located just outside the city of Senigallia, region of Marche, Italy.

== History ==
The church was commissioned in 1494 by the local lord Giovanni Della Rovere, as a votive offering after the birth of his son on March 25, 1490, and placed in hands of the Franciscan order. The birth of Francesco Maria I della Rovere, future Duke of Urbino, on the day of the Annunciation which is recorded in a small bas-relief in the entrance to the cloister.

The design is attributed to the Florentine architect Baccio Pontelli. Some attribute part of the design to Girolamo Genga. Work continued until the 17th century under the patronage of the last Della Rovere Duke of Urbino.

The cloister has frescoed lunettes depicting scenes from the Life of St Francis (1598) attributed to Petrus Franciscus Renulfus. The apse has an altarpiece depicting an Enthroned Virgin and Saints by Pietro Perugino.

The church once held the Madonna di Senigallia which is now attributed to Piero della Francesca, and is displayed in the Gallerie Nazionale delle Marche in Urbino. The painting, attributed during the early 19th century to Fra Carnevale was still in situ in 1900.

Giovanni Della Rovere was buried in the church in 1501, his tomb can be seen in the right wall of the nave. The convent now houses a museum on the history of local agriculture, including the economic system of metayage.
