= Senigallia Public Library =

- Biblioteca Comunale Antonelliana
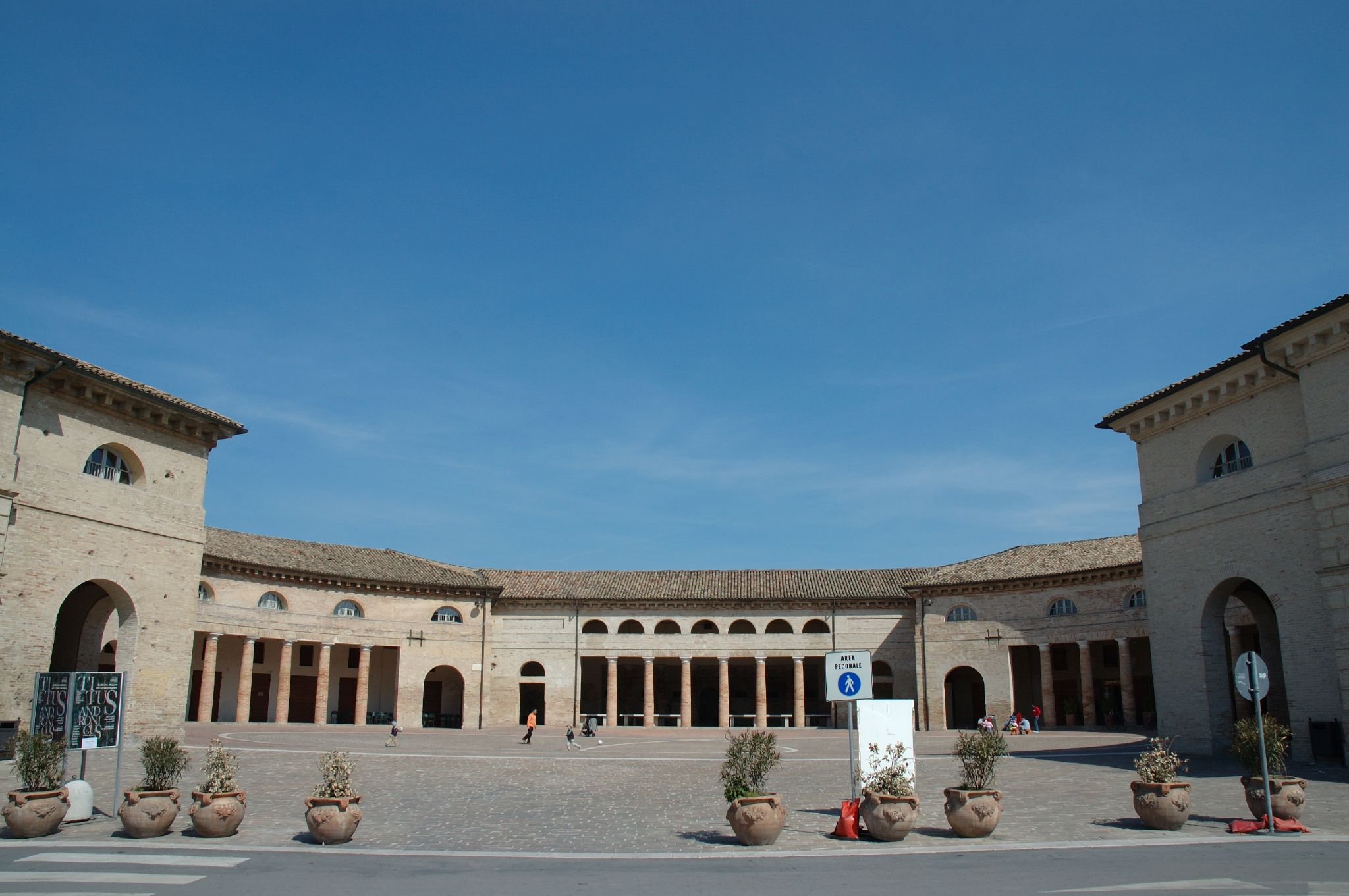
- Outside of Library
- 43.71619869645861°N 13.220472720986898°E
- Location: Senigallia, Italy
- Established: 1825

Collection
- Size: 80.000 books and other items

Access and use
- Population served: 44.464

Other information
- Director: Melissa Riccardi
- Website: www.comune.senigallia.an.it/site/biblioteca/live/taxonomy/index.html

The public library Antonelliana is the main library and historical archive of the city of Senigallia, province of Ancona, in the region of Marche, Italy.

== Description ==
The municipal library Antonelliana or "Biblioteca Antonelliana" is located in the immediate vicinity of the Foro Annonario, Senigallia in Italy. Approximately 23,000 visitors come each year, to patron the library, thanks to the congress hall, participate in summer meetings organized throughout the city and the educational workshops.

In addition to serving as library and archive to Senigallia, the Antonelliana is also a media and newspaper library, youth information center, and hosts a WiFi network.

=== Collection ===
The original core derived from the private collection of Leonardo Antonelli, consisting largely of religious materials, and gifted after Leonardo's death in 1811 to the municipality. Initially preserved by the municipality, thanks in particular to cardinal Domenico Consolini, additional collections have been added over the years. In the 60's, thanks to the communal administration purchasing numerous books and receiving other donations, the collection rose to 35000 books. Today the collection has about 80,000 pieces including historical documents related to the construction of La Fenice.

== Historical archive ==
Among the manuscripts in the collection is a copy of the Ethiopien text the Book of Enoch, one of the first to arrive in Europe. The origin of the manuscript has long been unknown. The orientalist Agostino Antonio Giorgi mentions it for the first time in a letter (not dated), written before 1775. It was only recently established that it came from the explorer James Bruce who had given it to Pope Clement XIV during a visit to Rome in December 1773. The manuscript, never translated or published, remained in the Biblioteca Antonelliana until after his death, Angelo Mai purchased it around 1825 for the Vatican Library making it for the first time available for international research.

== History ==
=== The transfer to Senigallia ===
Despite the testamentary disposition of Nicolò Maria Antonelli, the library was transferred to Senigallia only becoming public in 1825 (following the death of his nephew Leonardo Antonelli in 1811), and only after the decision of a judge was called into question by the municipal administration. The library was housed in the "Palazzo del Governo" in Piazza Navona, Roma, and three years later the first librarian, Canon Antonio Simoncelli, was appointed. Soon the books were transferred to Piazza Garibaldi, where a gymnasium was presented, and trusted with the Jesuit library, but always keeping it open to the public. In 1860, following the suppression of many religious orders, many publications of the library of the Servites and Capuchins were placed on the shelves of the library.

== Closure and rebirth ==
After a period of neglect, which ended in 1930, also because of the earthquake that struck in the same year Senigallia, the library was moved to the Rinaldoni palace, in Via Fratelli Bandiera. However, before the transfer was completed, it was decided the Palazzo Gherardi, along the porticos of the village, would be used as its headquarters.

Since 1994 the library has been part of the National Library Service of Italy, four years later is used the current seat was given the location forum.
