= Lambertz =

Lambertz is a surname. Notable people with the surname include:

- Andreas Lambertz (born 1984), German footballer
- Göran Lambertz (born 1950), Swedish governmental official
- Karl-Heinz Lambertz (born 1952), Belgian politician
- Maximilian Lambertz (1882–1963), Austrian Albanologist
