= Ducal Palace, Urbino =

Renaissance building in Urbino, Italy

Ducal palace of Urbino
- Palazzo Ducale di Urbino
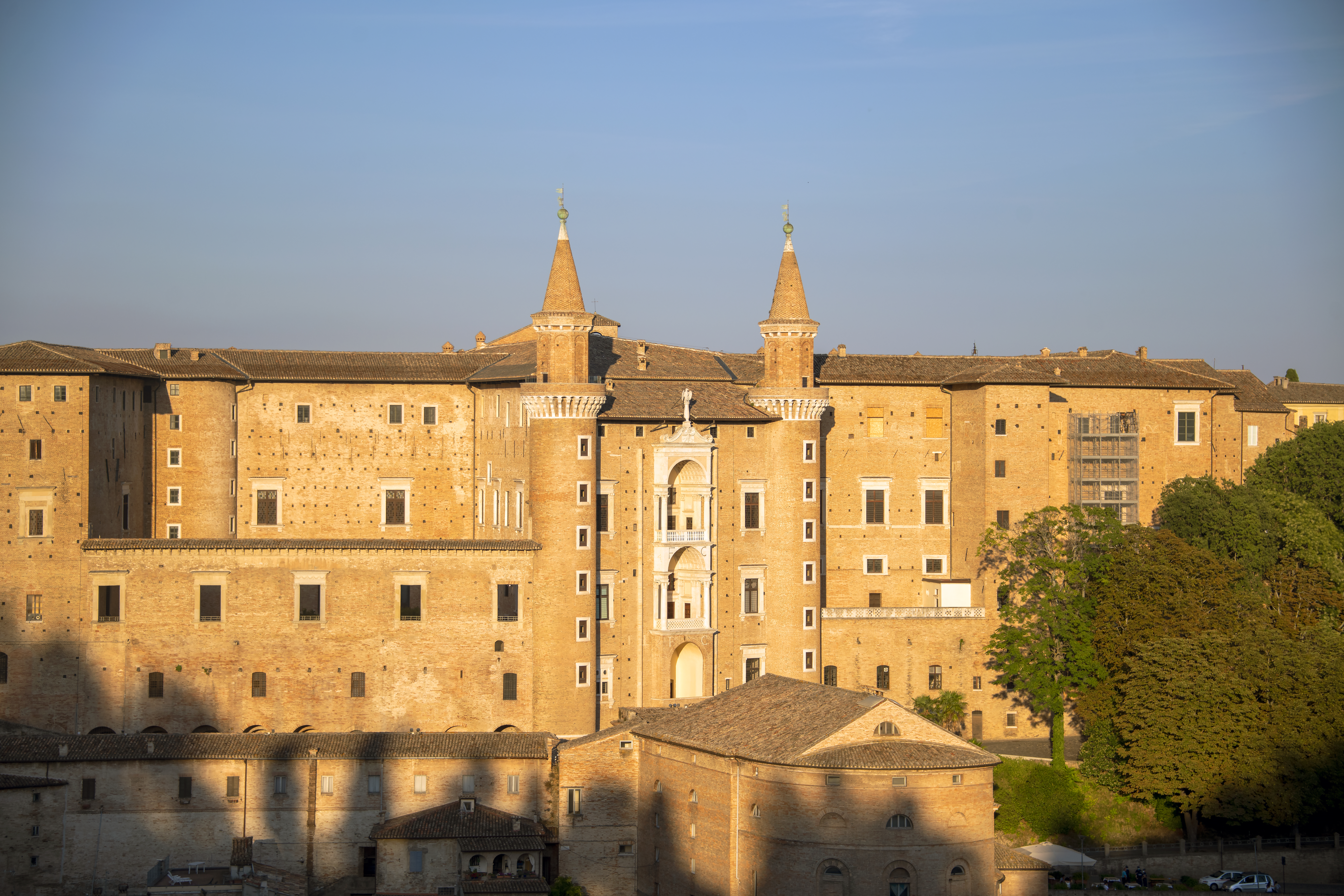
- The palace's façade

General information
- Status: now used as a museum, National Gallery
- Type: Palace
- Location: Urbino, Italy, Piazza Duca Federico
- Coordinates: 43.723333°N 12.637778°E
- Construction started: 1454
- Client: House of Montefeltro, House of Della Rovere

Website
- Official site of the Ducal Palace

UNESCO World Heritage Site
- Official name: Palazzo Ducale: Centro storico di Urbino
- Type: Cultural
- Criteria: ii, iv
- Designated: 1998 (30th session)
- Reference no.: 828
- Region: Europe

The Ducal Palace (Italian: Palazzo Ducale) is a Renaissance building in the Italian city of Urbino in the Marche. One of the most important monuments in Italy, it's been listed as a UNESCO World Heritage Site since 1998.

== History ==
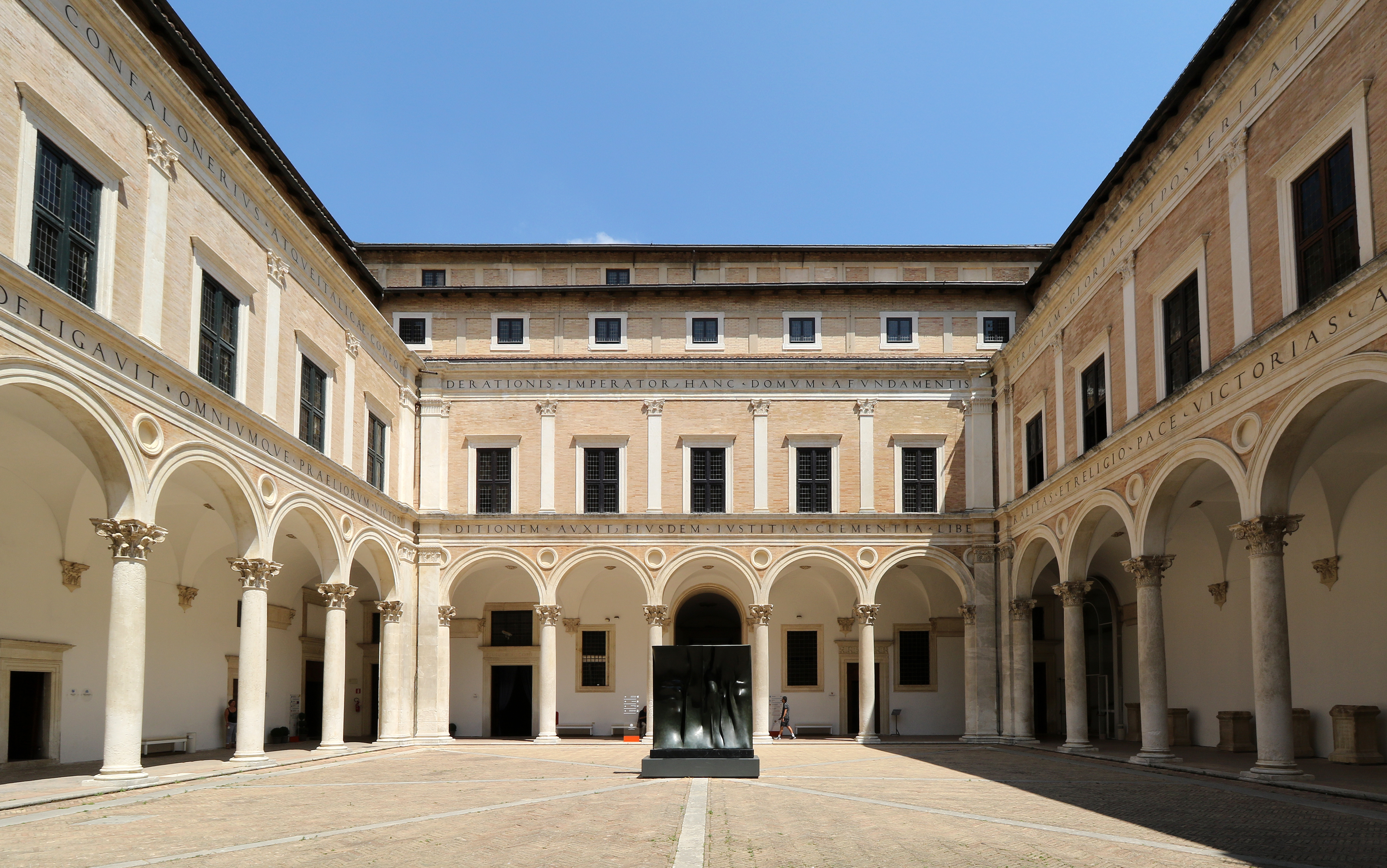
The arcaded courtyard

The construction of the Ducal Palace was begun for Duke Federico III da Montefeltro around the mid-fifteenth century by the Florentine Maso di Bartolomeo. The new construction included the pre-existing Palace of the Jole. The solid rock hillside salient was impregnable to siege but was problematic for carving out the foundation of a palace. Thus, a prominent fortress-builder, Luciano Laurana, from Dalmatia, was hired to build the substructure; but Laurana departed Urbino before the living quarters of the palace were begun. After Laurana, the designer or designers of the Ducal Palace are not known with certainty. Leading High Renaissance architect Donato Bramante was a native of Urbino and may have worked on the completion of the palace.

The Ducal Palace is famous as the setting of the conversations which Baldassare Castiglione represents as having taken place in the Hall of Vigils in 1507 in his Book of the Courtier.

The palace continued in use as a government building into the 20th century, housing municipal archives and offices, and public collections of antique inscriptions and sculpture (the Galleria Nazionale delle Marche, see below). Restorations completed in 1985 have reopened the extensive subterranean network to visitors.

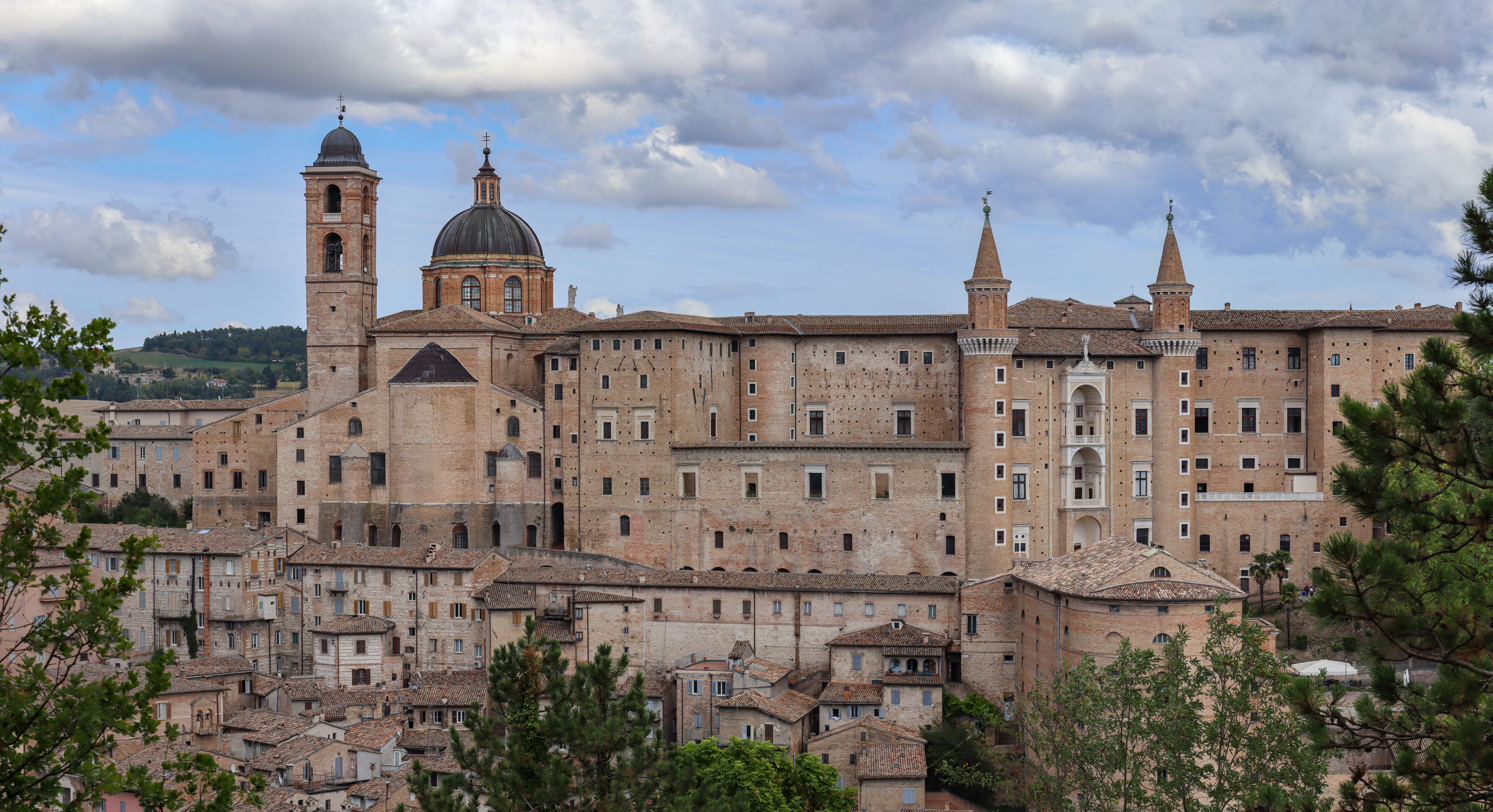
Panoramic view of Ducal Palace, Urbino (2024).

== Studiolo and twin chapels ==
The Ducal Palace featured several rooms that reflect Federico's devotion to Classical and humanistic studies and served his daily routine, which included visiting the palace's lararium and reading Greek literature. These learned and explicitly pagan touches were atypical of a medieval palazzo.

=== Studiolo ===
A central element in this plan is the studiolo (a small study or cabinet for contemplation), a room measuring 3.60 x 3.35m and facing away from the city of Urbino and towards the Duke's rural lands. Its intarsia wood inlaying, surrounding the room's occupant with illusionary trompe-l'œil shelves, benches, and half-open latticework doors displaying symbolic objects representing the Liberal Arts, is a famous example of this Italian craft of inlay. The benches hold replica musical instruments, the shelves contain reproductions of books and musical scores, simulated scientific instruments (including an astrolabe and an armillary sphere), study furnishings (including a two-dimensional writing desk and an hourglass), weapons and armor, and various other objects (e.g. parrots in cages and a mazzocchio).

Intarsia paneling of the studiolo

Astronomical instruments and mazzocchio

A mechanical clock

The studiolo also features iconic representations of several persons, both contemporary and historical. On the intarsia panels are depicted statues of Federico in scholarly attire and of Faith, Hope, and Charity. Above the intarsia panels are portraits of great authors by Joos van Wassenhove (with reworking by Pedro Berruguete):

North wall
Plato	Aristotle	Ptolemy	Boethius
St. Gregory the Great	St. Jerome	St. Ambrose	St. Augustine
West wall		East wall
Pietro d'Abano	Petrarch	Moses	Cicero
Hippocrates	Dante	Solomon	Seneca
window		Aquinas	Homer
window		Duns Scotus	Virgil
South wall
Sixtus IV	Albertus Magnus	Bessarion	Pius II
Bartolus	Solon	Vittorino da Feltre	Euclid

The upper register (shown in the diagram's outside rows and columns) presents Classical and humanistic writers, as opposed to the religious figures (broadly speaking) of the lower register (inside).

=== Chapel of Absolution and Temple of the Muses ===
Downstairs from the studiolo are a twinned pair of chapels, one Christian and one pagan. The vestibule leading to them emphasizes their complementarity with this inscribed elegiac couplet:

Bina vides parvo discrimine iuncta sacella: altera pars musis, altera sacra deo est.	You see a pair of chapels, joined together with a small separation: the one part is sacred to the Muses, the other sacred to God.

The Temple of the Muses, which may have been used as the personal studiolo of Federico's son Guidobaldo, originally featured paintings of the Muses as "sober musicians" that are perhaps the work of Giovanni Santi.

== Galleria Nazionale delle Marche ==
The Galleria Nazionale delle Marche (National Gallery of the Marche), housed in the palace, is one of the most important collections of Renaissance art in the world. It includes important works by artists such as Raphael, Van Wassenhove (a Last Supper with portraits of the Montefeltro family and the court), Melozzo da Forlì, Piero della Francesca (with the famous Flagellation), Paolo Uccello, Timoteo Viti, and other 15th-century artists, as well as a late Resurrection by Titian.

=== Selected highlights ===
Attributed to Piero della Francesca
Ideal City, 60 x 200 cm

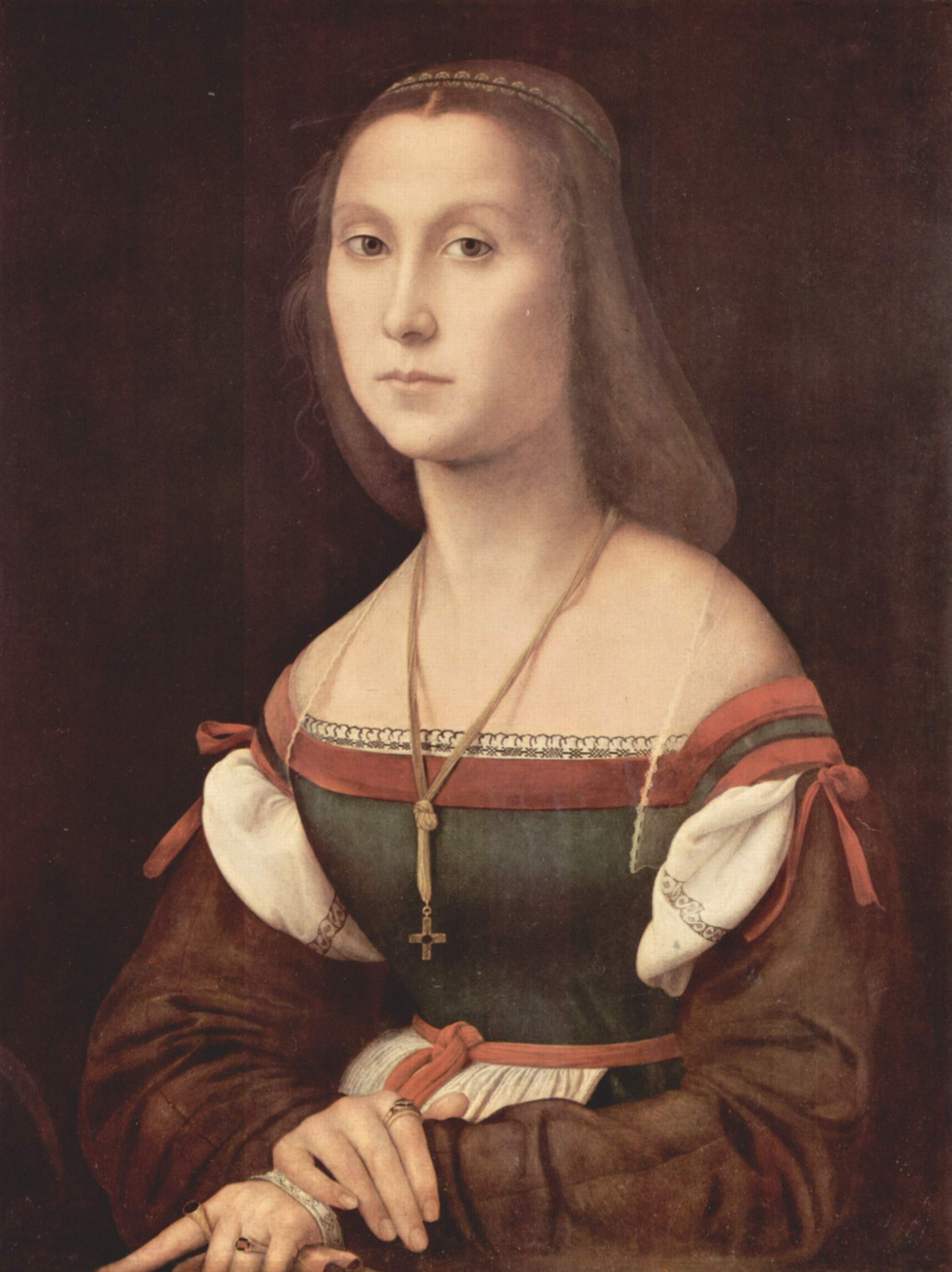
Raphael
La Muta, 64 x 48 cm

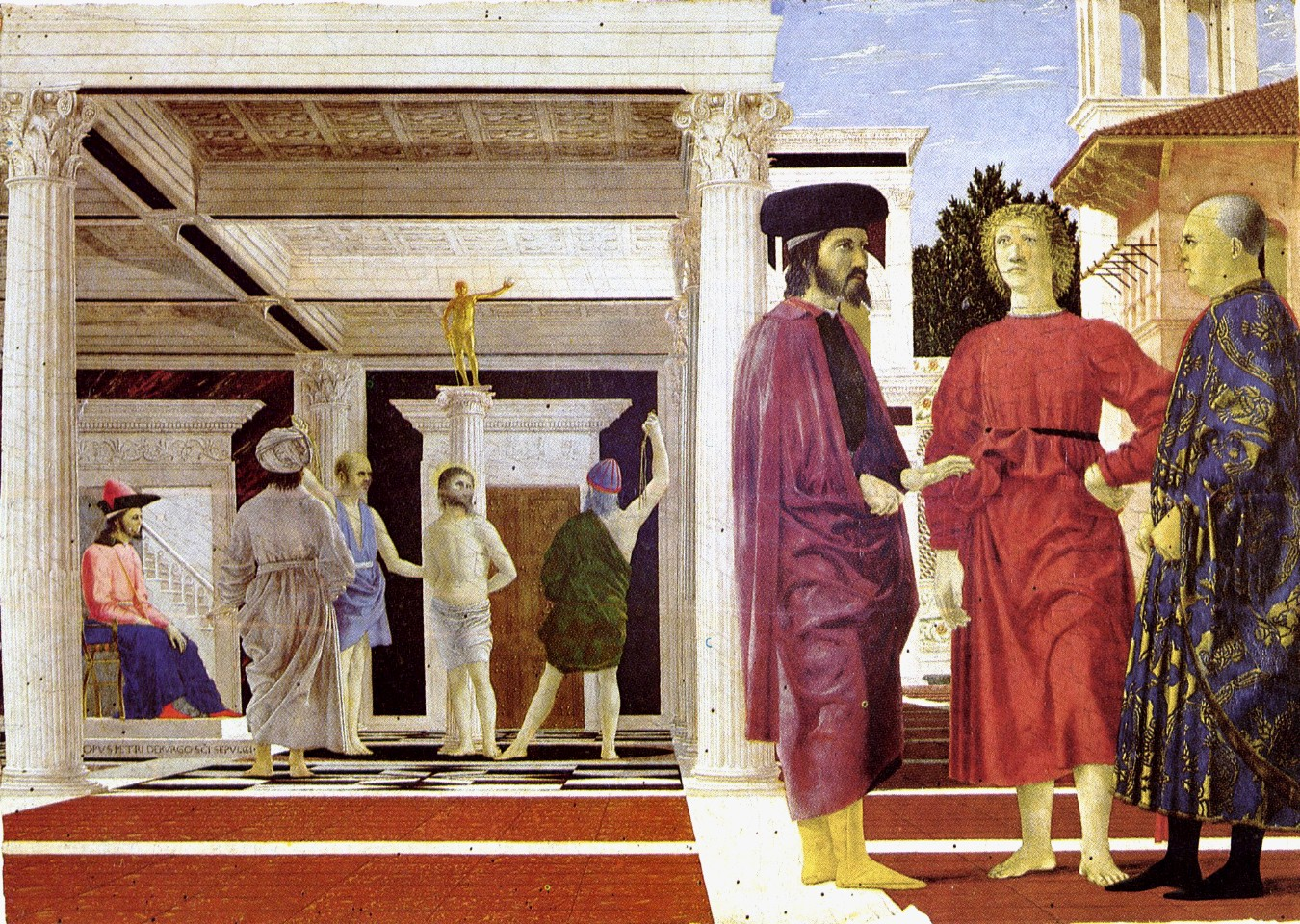
Piero della Francesca
Flagellation, 59 x 82 cm.

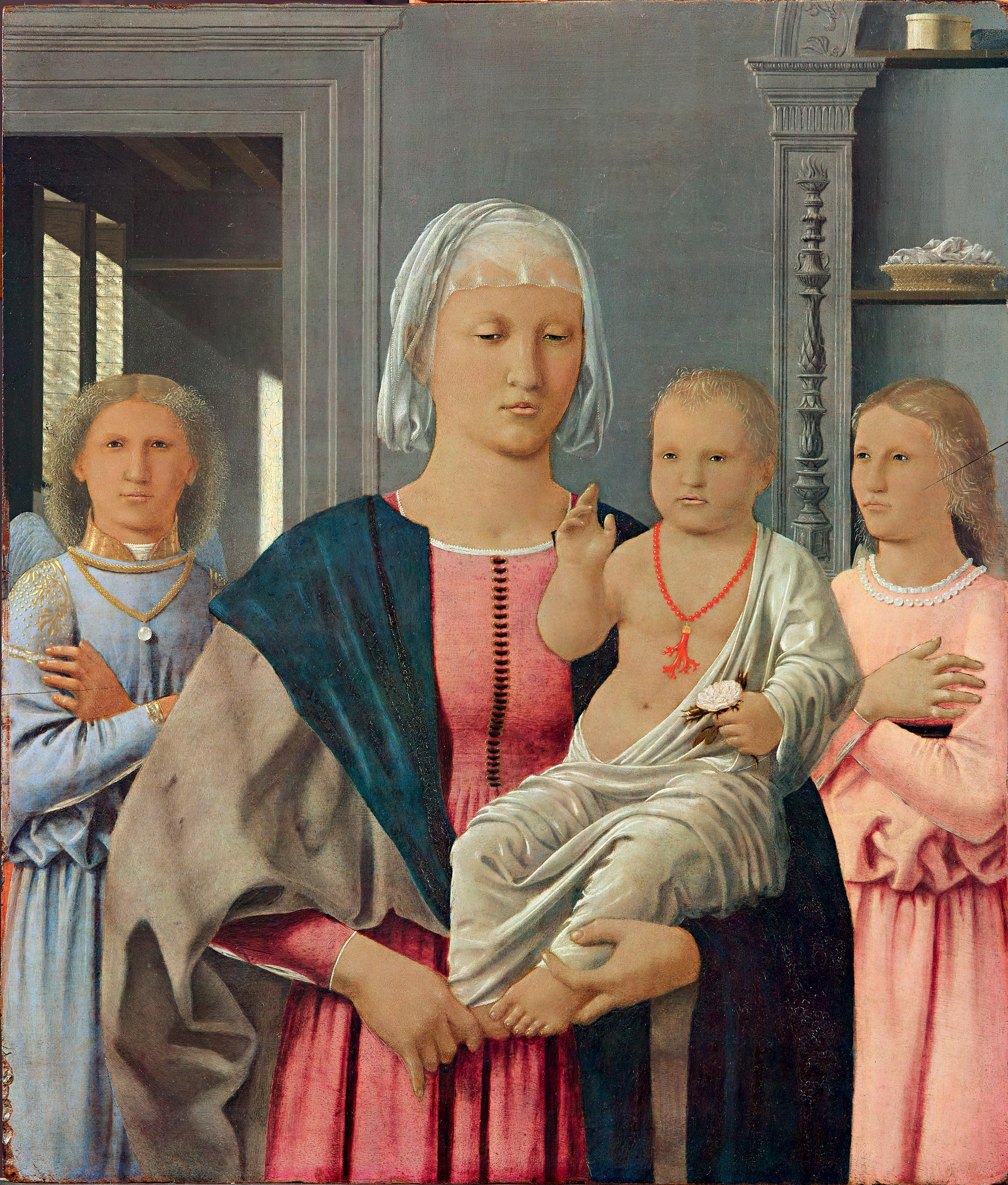
Piero della Francesca
Madonna di Senigallia, 61 x 53 cm.

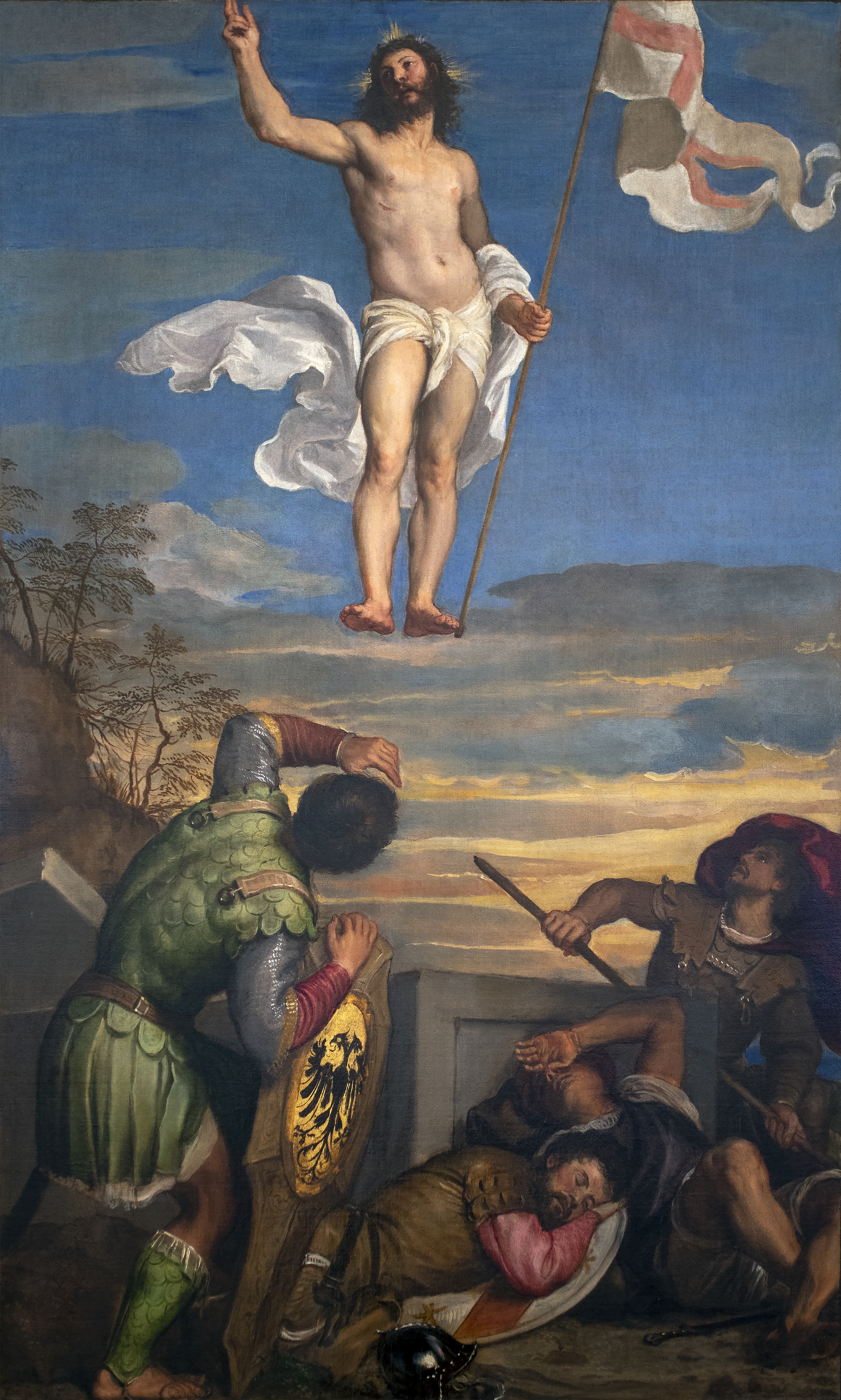
Titian
Resurrection, 163 x 104 cm

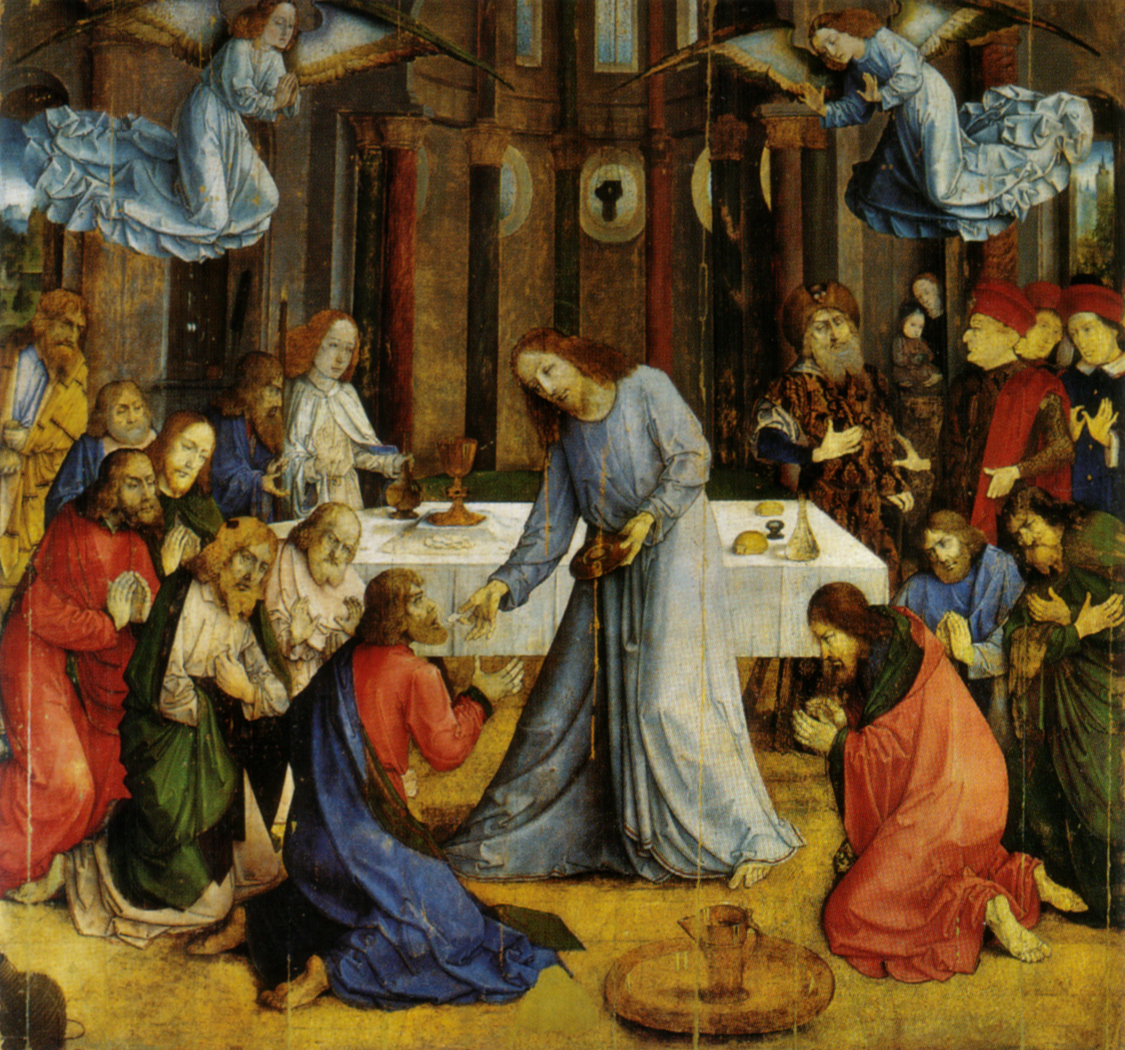
Joos van Wassenhove
Institution of Eucharist, 331 x 335 cm.

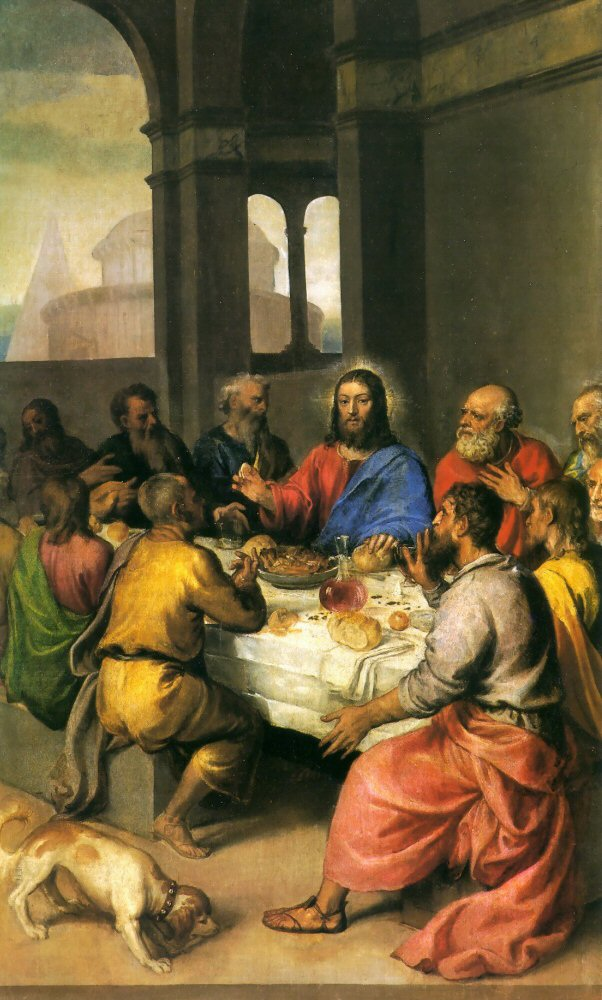
Titian
Last Supper, 163 x 104 cm.

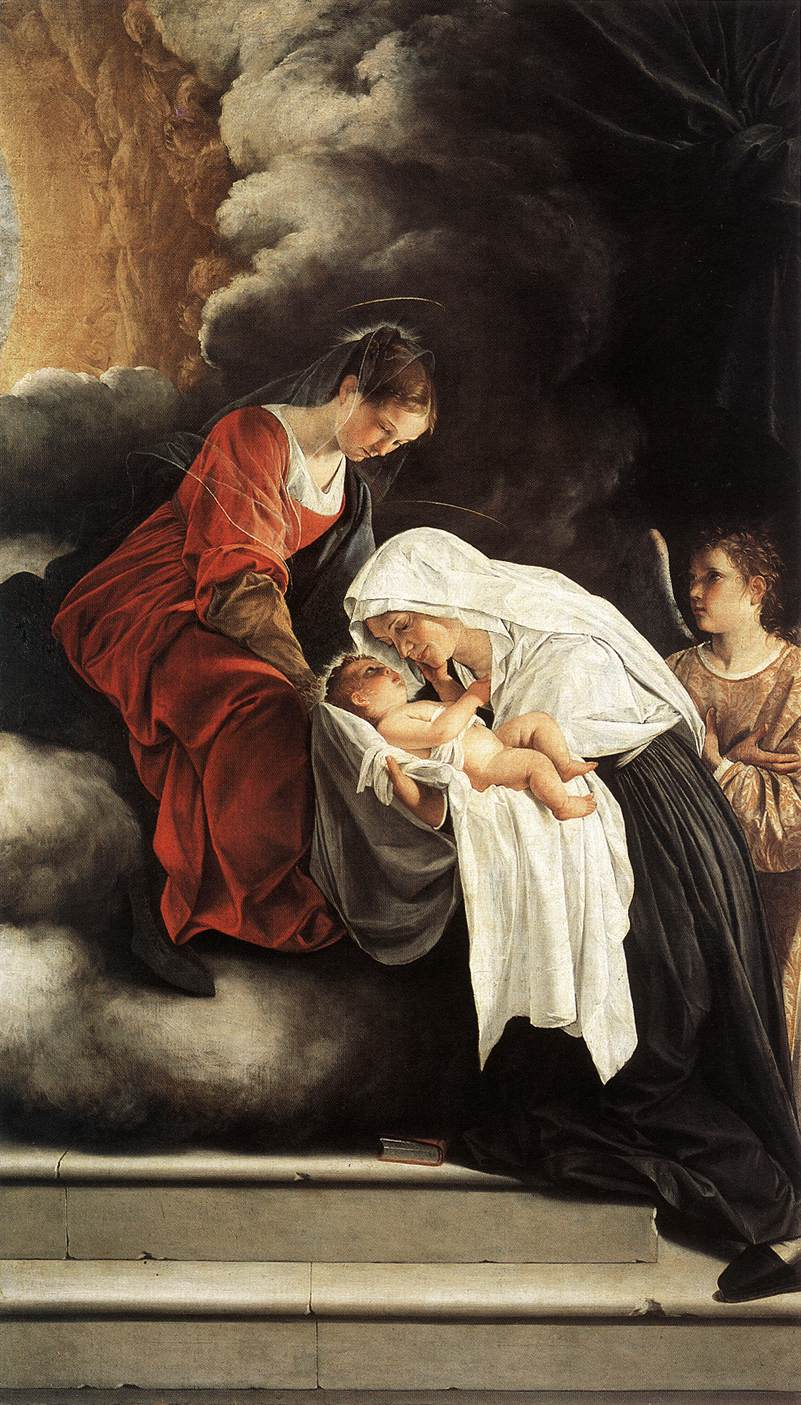
Orazio Gentileschi
Vision of St. Francesca Romana

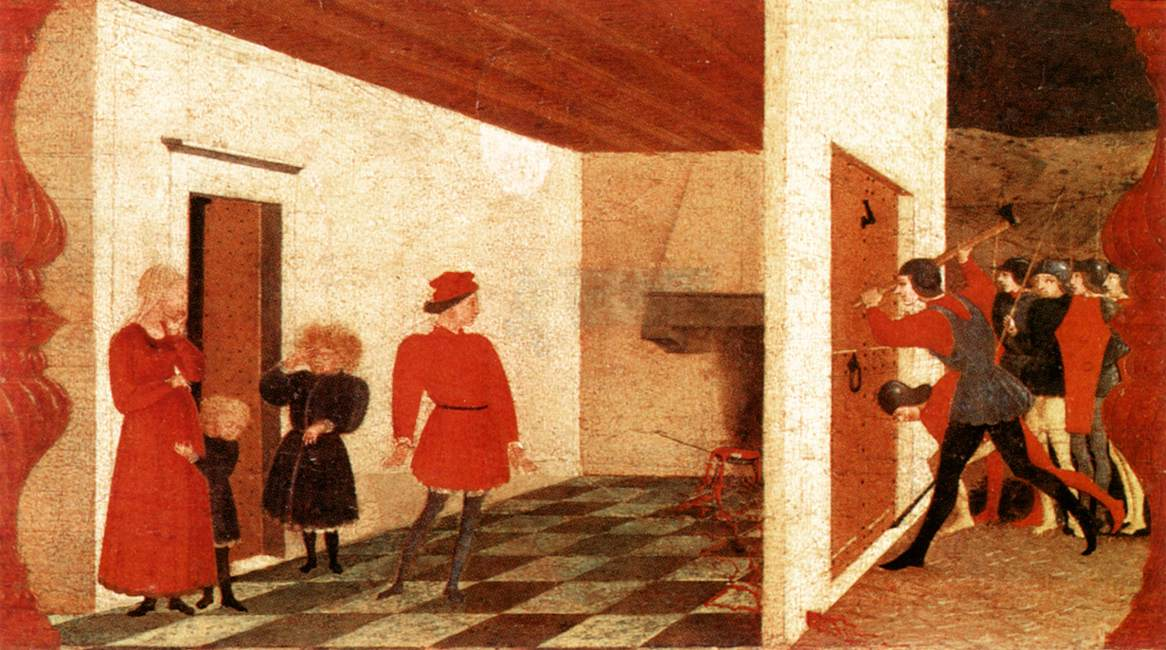
Paolo Uccello
Miracle of the Desecrated Host (Scene 2), 43 x 58 cm

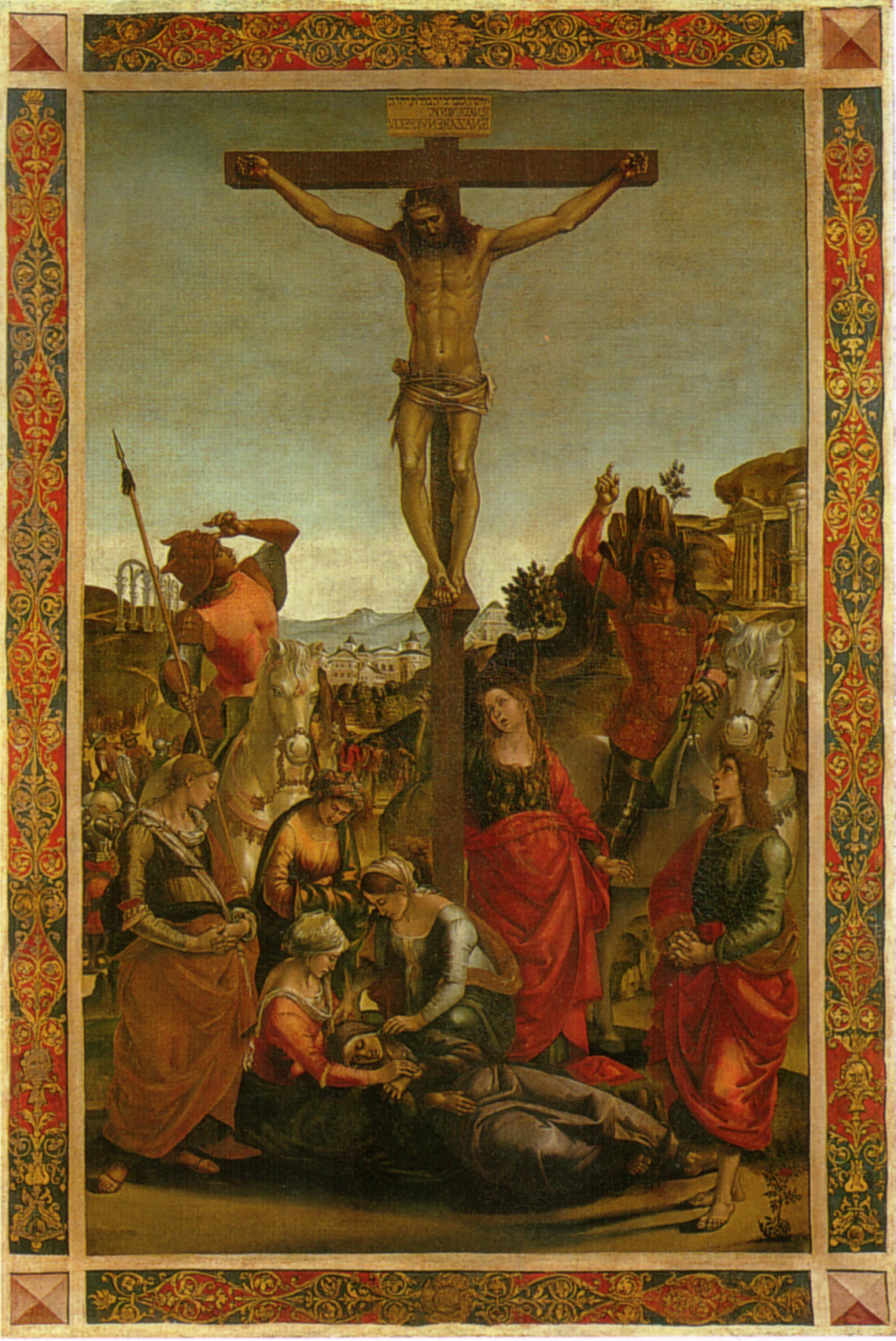
Luca Signorelli
Crucifixion, 144 x 89 cm.

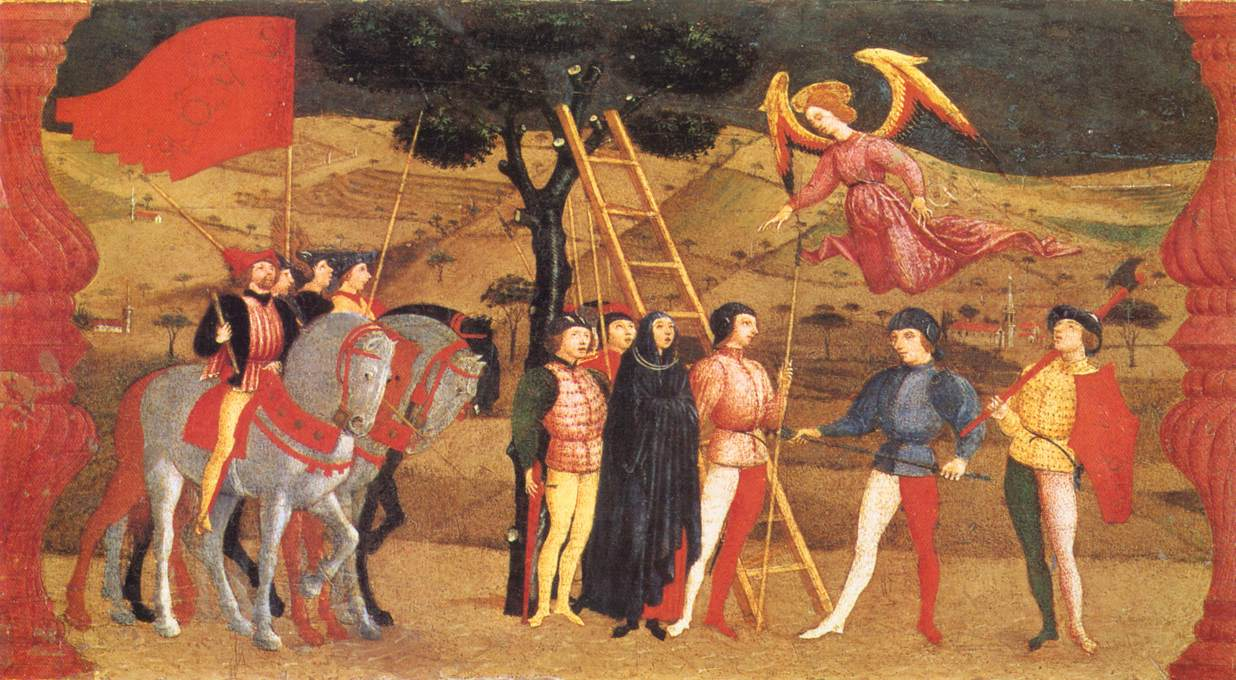
Paolo Uccello
Miracle of the Desecrated Host (Scene 4), 43 x 58 cm

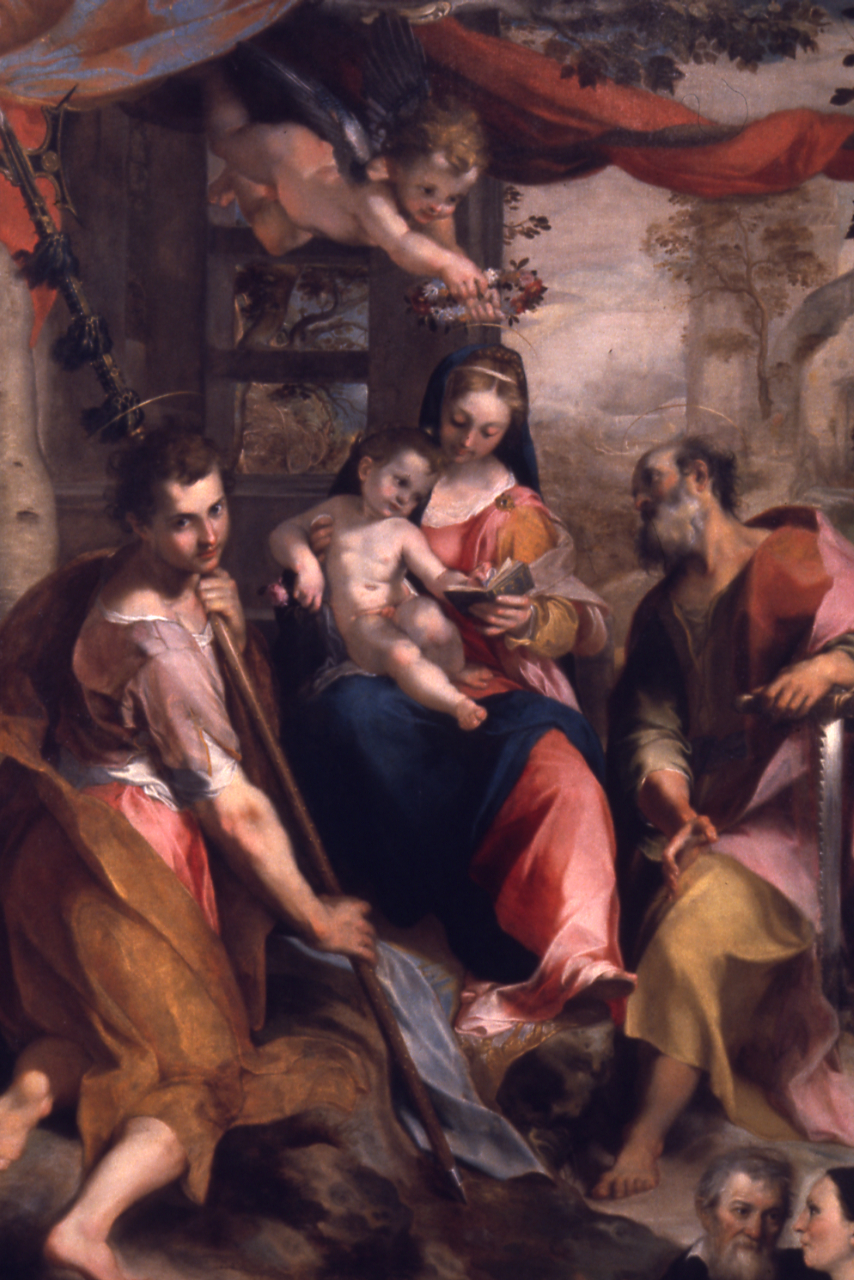
Federico Barocci
Virgin and Child with Saints, 283 x 190 cm.

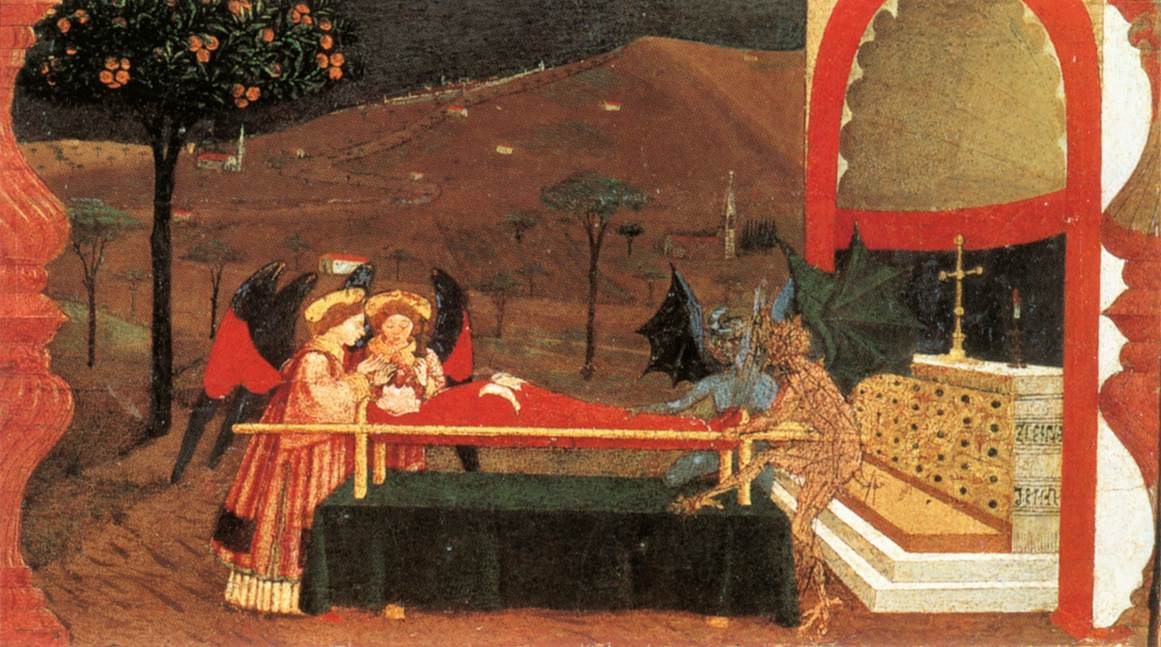
Paolo Uccello
Miracle of the Desecrated Host (Scene 6), 43 x 58 cm

== See also ==
- List of national galleries
- Renaissance in Urbino

== Sources ==
- Luciano Cheles, The Studiolo of Urbino: An Iconographic Investigation (Penn State Press, 1986)
- Robert Kirkbride, Architecture and Memory. The Renaissance Studioli of Federico da Montefeltro (Columbia University Press, 2008)
