= Summer Jamboree =

Music festival in Senigallia, Italy

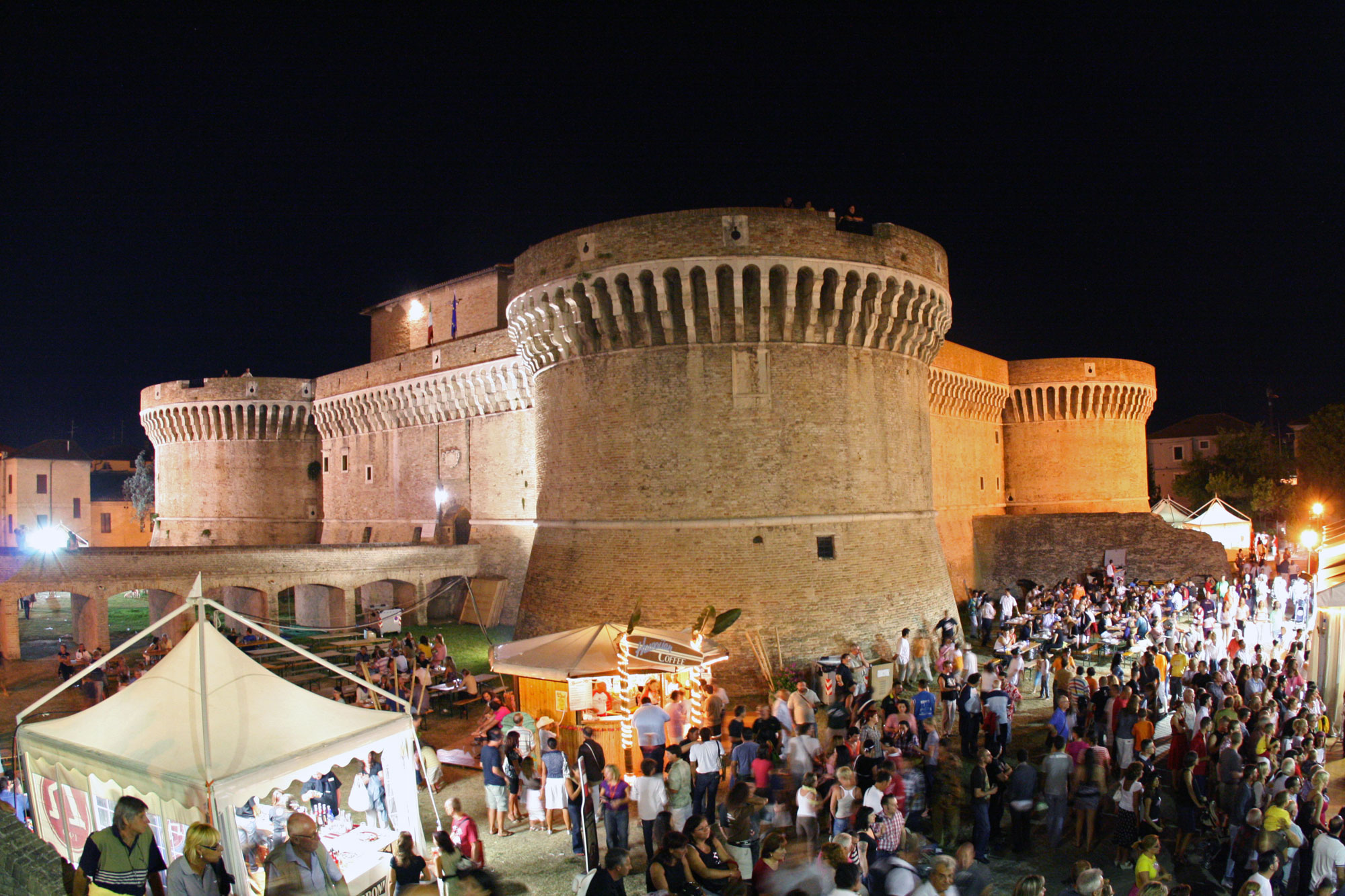
- Rocca Roveresca, Senigallia, 2008
- Frequency: Annual
- Locations: Senigallia, Italy
- Years active: 2000–present
- Website: summerjamboree.com

Summer Jamboree is an annual international music festival that takes place in Senigallia, Italy. The event was launched in 2000 and spanned the course of one day. The 2015 edition lasted ten days and counted about 400,000 admissions, while the 2017 edition spanned twelve days and recorded an attendance of 420,000. In 2018, approximately 400,000 people attended the event.
