= Senigallia =

- Comune
- Città di Senigallia
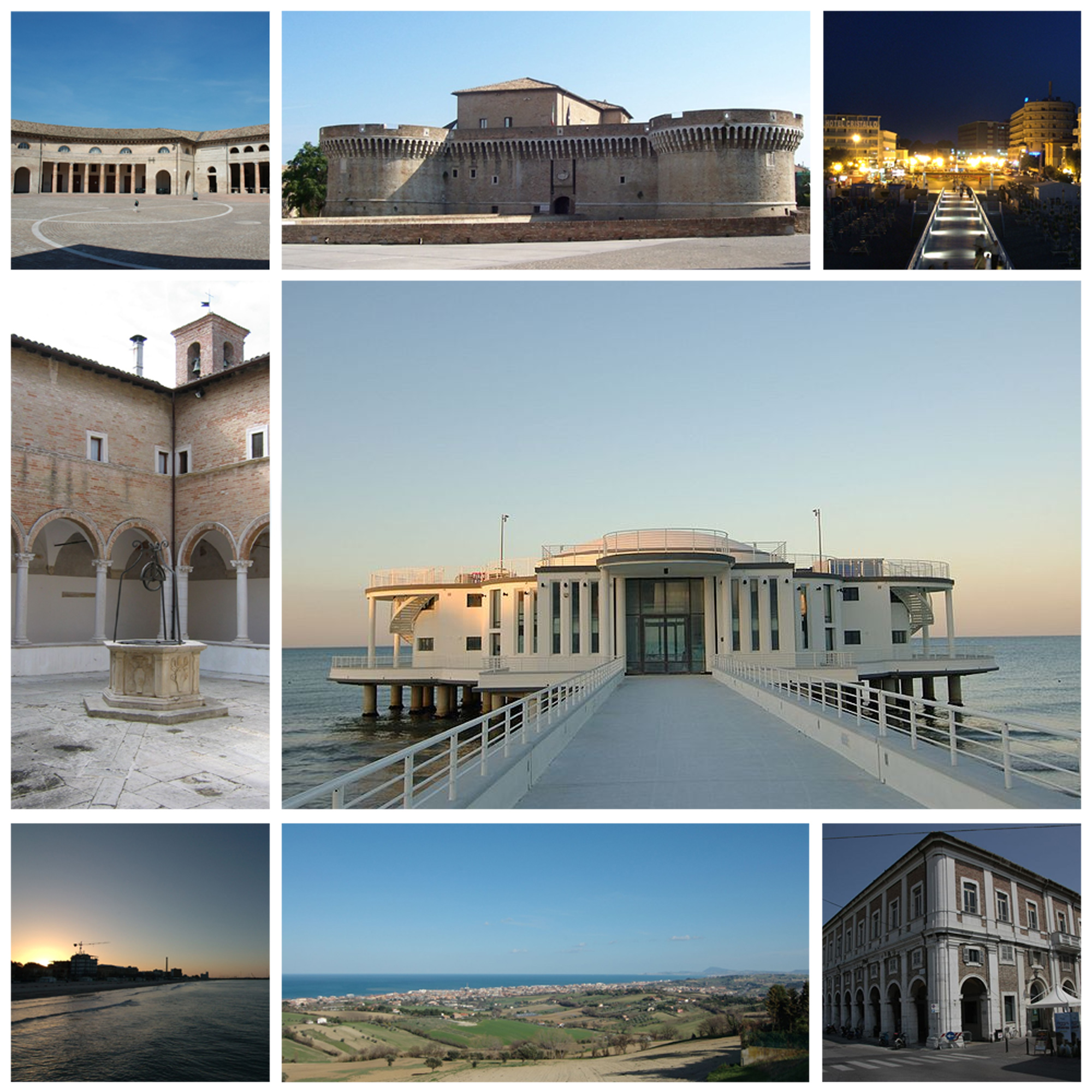
- Top left: Annonario Square; top centre: Rocca Roveresca Fortress; top right: night view of Piazzale della Libertà waterfront area; middle left: Chiostro delle Grazie; middle right: Rotonda a Mare; bottom left: view of the sunset in Spiaggia Velluto Beach; bottom centre: view of the town from Scapezzano Hill; bottom right: Portici Ercolani

- Coat of arms

- Senigallia within the Province of Ancona

- Location within Italy Location within Marche
- Coordinates: 43°43′N 13°13′E
- Country: Italy
- Region: Marche
- Province: Ancona (AN)
- Frazioni: see list

Government
  - Mayor: Massimo Olivetti (Centre-right coalition)

Area
  - Total: 115 km^{2} (44 sq mi)
- Elevation: 5 m (16 ft)

Population (30 November 2017)
  - Total: 44,632
  - Density: 388/km^{2} (1,010/sq mi)
- Demonym: Senigalliesi
- Time zone: UTC+1 (CET)
  - Summer (DST): UTC+2 (CEST)
- Postal code: 60019
- Dialing code: 071
- Patron saint: St. Paulinus
- Saint day: May 4
- Website: Official website

Senigallia (or Sinigaglia in Old Italian; Romagnol: S'nigaja) is a comune (municipality) and resort town on Italy's Adriatic coast. It is situated in the province of Ancona, in the Italian region of Marche, and lies approximately 30 kilometres north-west of the provincial capital city Ancona. Senigallia's small port is located at the mouth of the River Misa. It is one of the endpoints of the Massa–Senigallia Line, one of the most important dividing lines (isoglosses) in the classification of the Romance languages.

== History ==
Senigallia was first settled in the 4th century BC by the Gallic Senone tribe, who had settled the coastal area. In 284 BC, the area and the settlement were taken over by Romans, who established the colony Sena Gallica there to control the region they called the Ager Gallicus. "Sena" is probably a corrupted form of "Senones" and "Gallica" (meaning "Gaulish") distinguished it from Sena (Siena) in Etruria.

In the prelude to the Battle of the Metaurus between Romans and Carthaginians in 207 BC, Sena Gallica was the southernmost point of Carthaginian General Hasdrubal Barca's invasion of Italy. Senigallia was ravaged by Alaric during the decline of the Roman Empire and fortified when it became part of the Byzantine Empire. It was again laid waste by the Lombards in the 8th century and by the Saracens in the 9th. It was one of the five cities of the medieval Adriatic duchy of Pentapolis.

The diocese and the bishopric had long been established, and the city saw economic development, including the establishment of the so-called Magdalena Fair around the 13th century. The fair's popularity grew when Sergius, count of Senigallia, became engaged to the daughter of the count of Marseilles. On his engagement, the count of Marseilles presented Sergius with relics, said to be of Mary Magdalene. The fair was visited by merchants from both Europe and the Levant.

In the 15th century, Senigallia was captured and recaptured many times by opposing sides during the Guelph and Ghibelline war. Sigismondo Pandolfo Malatesta of Rimini fortified the town in the years 1450–1455. Pope Pius II made his nephew Antonio Piccolomini Lord of Senigallia in [?], but in 1464 the residents pledged loyalty to Pope Paul II. In 1472, Giacomo Piccolomini tried, but failed, to seize the town. Pope Sixtus IV then assigned the lordship to his kinsmen on the Della Rovere family. In 1503 Cesare Borgia, the brother of the famous Lucrezia Borgia and illegitimate son of the Pope Alexander VI, ordered a series of executions as revenge for the Magione conspiracy, where powerful princes, most of whom were Borgia's former military allies and commanders, plotted to remove him from power to prevent him from gaining too much influence over Italy. In 1516, Pope Leo X transferred the Lordship to his nephew Lorenzo II de' Medici, then again the Della Rovere family took over from 1624 when Senigallia eventually was annexed to the Papal States' legation (province) of Urbino.

Senigallia is the birthplace of Giovanni Maria Mastai Ferretti, Pope Pius IX. He was born here in 1792, became pope in 1846, and was the last pope to rule the Papal States before Italian unification.

During the First World War, the town and its port were devastated by intensive shelling by units of the Austro-Hungarian Navy led by the battleship SMS Zrínyi. The town was also badly damaged by a strong earthquake in 1930 and during the Second World War.

== Geography ==
The municipality borders Belvedere Ostrense, Mondolfo (PU), Monte San Vito, Montemarciano, Morro d'Alba, Ostra and Trecastelli.

The municipality includes the hamlets (frazioni) of Bettolelle, Borgo Bicchia, Borgo Catena, Borgo Passera, Brugnetto, Cannella, Castellaro, Cesanella, Cesano, Ciarnin, Filetto, Gabriella, Grottino, Mandriola, Marzocca, Montignano, Roncitelli, Sant'Angelo, San Silvestro, Scapezzano and Vallone.

== Main sights ==
Though traces of the city's history are still visible, much of today's city is modern. Visitor attractions include:

- Palazzo Comunale, from the 17th century
- Rocca Roveresca – castle of Gothic origins, restored by Baccio Pontelli in 1492. It has a square plan with four large round towers.
- The Cathedral, erected after 1787
- Santa Maria delle Grazie – one of the only two churches attributed to Baccio Pontelli (the other is at Orciano, near Mondavio, about 20 kilometres (12 miles) to the west by road). It contains a museum of the mezzadria agrarian life typical of the area, with farm tools, dresses, photos, etc. It once housed the painting of Madonna di Senigallia by Piero della Francesca.
- Chiesa della Croce
- Rotonda a mare, an art nouveau pier

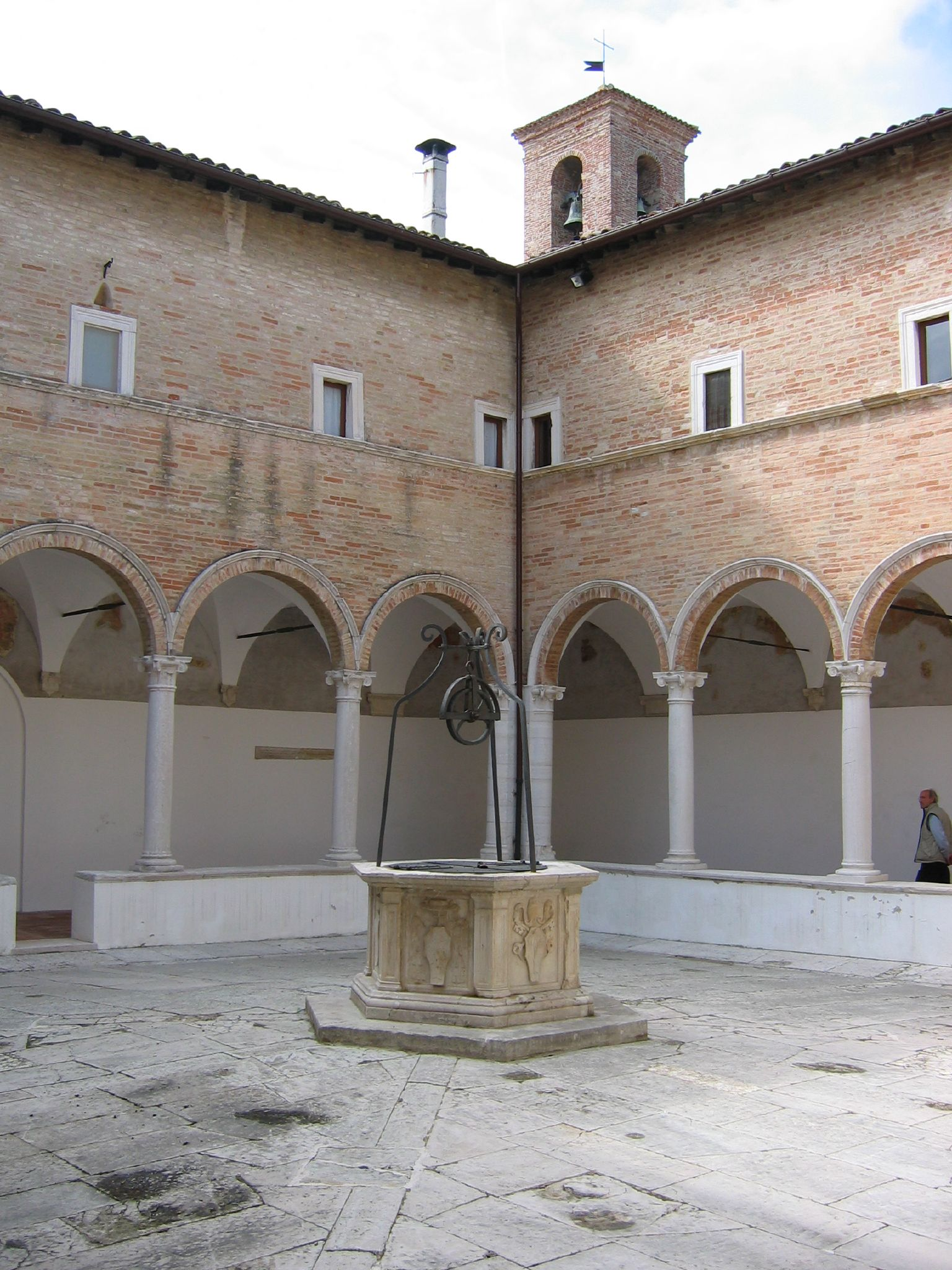
The Chiostro delle Grazie ("Cloister of the Graces")

== Twin towns – sister cities ==
Senigallia is twinned with:

- Chester, United Kingdom
- Lörrach, Germany
- Sens, France

== See also ==
- Diocese of Senigallia
- Senigallia Public Library
- Summer Jamboree
- US Vigor Senigallia

== Sources ==
- GIORGI E., LEPORE G., 2010 (a cura di), Archeologia nella valle del Cesano tra Suasa e Santa Maria in Portuno (1996-2001), Atti delle giornate di studio in occasione dei Venti anni di ricerche archeologiche dell’Università di Bologna nella Valle del Cesano (Castelleone di Suasa, Corinaldo 18 dicembre 2008, San Lorenzo in Campo, 19 dicembre 2008), Bologna.
