= Campania =

- Region
- Flag Coat of arms

- Coordinates: 40°45′N 14°57′E
- Country: Italy
- Capital: Naples

Government
  - Type: Presidential system
  - President: Roberto Fico (M5S)
  - Legislature: Regional Council

Area
  - Total: 13,670.95 km^{2} (5,278.38 sq mi)

Population (2026)
  - Total: 5,568,703
  - Rank: 3rd in Italy
  - Density: 407.3384/km^{2} (1,055.002/sq mi)
- Demonyms: English: Campanian; Italian: Campano (man); Italian: Campana (woman)

GDP
  - Total: €137.511 billion (2024)
  - Per capita: €24,635 (2024)
- Time zone: UTC+1 (CET)
  - Summer (DST): UTC+2 (CEST)
- ISO 3166 code: IT-72
- HDI (2021): 0.856 very high · 19th of 21
- NUTS Region: ITF
- Website: www.regione.campania.it

Campania (Note: /kæmˈpeɪniə/ kam-PAY-nee-ə, UK also /kæmˈpæniə/ kam-PAN-ee-ə, US also /kɑːmˈpɑːniə/ kahm-PAH-nee-ə; Italian: [kamˈpaːnja], Neapolitan: [kamˈbɑːnjə].) is an administrative region of Italy, located in the south of the country; most of it is in the southwestern portion of the Italian Peninsula (with the Tyrrhenian Sea to its west), but it also includes the small Phlegraean Islands – Ischia, Procida, Vivara, and Nisida – and the island of Capri. The capital is Naples. Campania has a population of 5,568,703 as of 2026, making it Italy's 3rd-most populous region, and, with an area of 13,670.95 km^{2} (5,278 sq mi), its 2nd most densely populated. Based on its GDP, Campania is also the most economically productive region in Southern Italy and the 7th most productive in the whole country. Naples's urban area, which is in Campania, is the seventh most populous in the European Union.

The region is home to 10 of the 58 UNESCO sites in Italy, including Pompeii and Herculaneum, the Royal Palace of Caserta, the Amalfi Coast, the Longobardian Church of Santa Sofia in Benevento, and the Historic Centre of Naples. In addition, Campania's Mount Vesuvius is part of the UNESCO World Network of Biosphere Reserves. The region plays a key international role in international diplomacy, since it is home to NATO's Allied Joint Force Command Naples and the Parliamentary Assembly of the Mediterranean. The Campania's hinterland was inhabited from the beginning of the 1st millennium BC by the Osci, Samnites, and Etruscans, while between the 8th and 7th centuries BC its coastal areas were colonised by the ancient Greeks (Magna Graecia). At that time, Capua was Campania's leading city, while Naples was an anomaly, being predominantly Greek-speaking.

Campania is rich in culture, especially food, music, architecture, and archaeological and ancient sites such as Pompeii, Herculaneum, Oplontis, Paestum, Aeclanum, Stabiae, and Velia. The name Campania derives from Latin; the Romans knew the region as Campania felix ('fertile countryside' or 'happy countryside'). Campania's rich natural beauty makes it important to the tourism industry: Naples, the Amalfi Coast, Mount Vesuvius, and the islands of Capri and Ischia have long been major attractions.

== History ==
=== Pre-Roman period ===
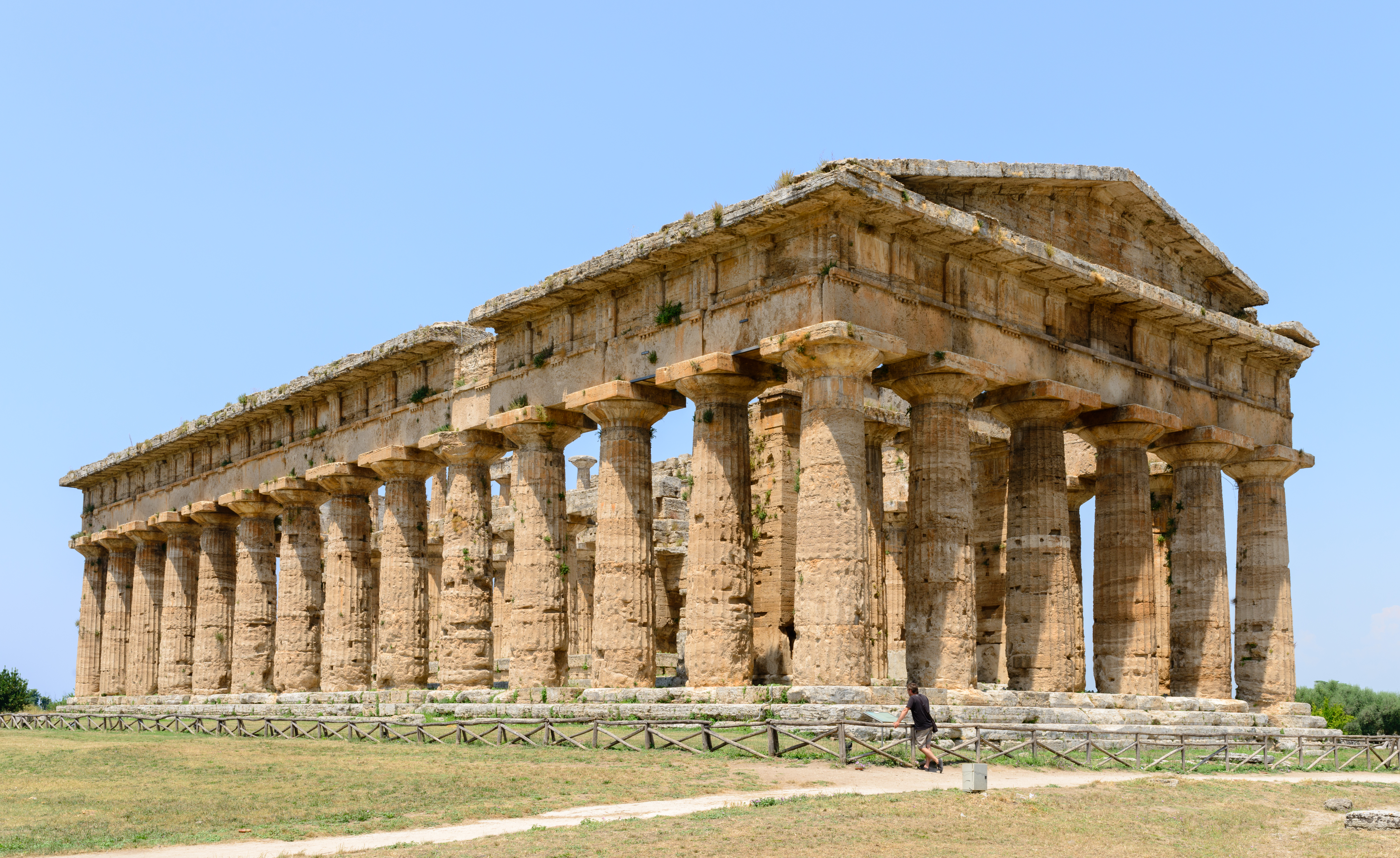
Ancient Greek Temple of Hera, Paestum, built in the Doric order around 460–450 BC

The region known today as Campania was inhabited from at least the beginning of the 1st millennium BC by several Oscan-speaking Italic tribes: the Osci, the Opici, the Aurunci, the Ausones, the Sidicini, the Hirpini, the Caudini, the Oenotrians, the Campanians (after whom the region is named) and the Lucanians (who inhabited the southernmost part of Campania, known in ancient times as Lucania, roughly where modern-day Salerno is). Many of these tribes lived in simple agro-towns. Not much is known about the pre-Indo-European tribes that had lived in the region earlier; they were probably not as technologically or culturally advanced as the Oscans, and any who still flourished had become fully Oscanised by the middle of the first millennium BC.

Between the 9th and 6th centuries BC, the Etruscans from Central Italy established colonies in the Campanian Plains (the inland territories that today are the provinces of Caserta and Naples), as well as in the regions of Agro Nocerino Sarnese and Agro Picentino (which today are in the province of Salerno). There, they essentially replicated their Dodecapolis (twelve cities) political model, founding the cities of Hyria (modern-day Nola), Irnthi or Marcina (modern-day Salerno), Amina (modern-day Pontecagnano), Velcha, Velsu and Uri. In addition to assimilating into their urban-political domains, the Etruscans also incorporated the pre-existing tribal Oscan agro-towns of Capua (modern-day Santa Maria Capua Vetere), Nuceria (modern-day comuni of Nocera Superiore and Nocera Inferiore), Suessula, Acerra, Ercolano, Pompeii, Stabiae and Sorrento.

Meanwhile, during the 8th century BC, Hellenes from Euboea (in Central Greece), known as Cumaeans, began to establish colonies themselves roughly around the coastal areas of the modern-day province of Naples and in the nearby islands founding, among others, the cities of Cumae, Pithekoūsai (modern-day Ischia), Paestum, Herculaneum and Dicaearchia, later 'Puteoli', in Latin (modern-day Pozzuoli). The city of Naples began as a small commercial port called Parthenope (Παρθενόπη, meaning "Pure Eyes", a Siren in Greek mythology), which was established by Greek colonial sailors from Rhodes. The region thus became one of the centers of Magna Graecia.

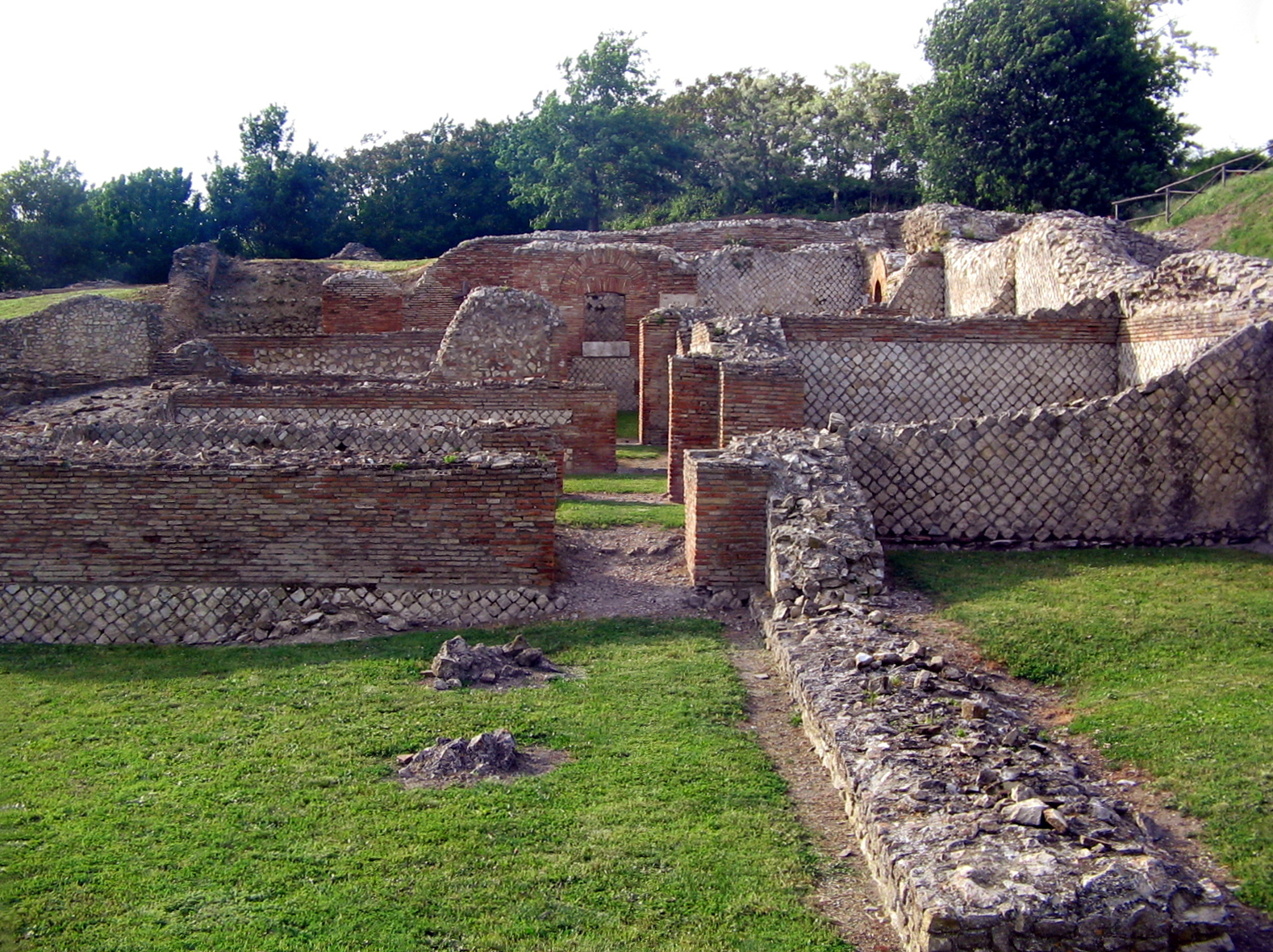
Ruins of Aeclanum, a Roman town in Irpinia district

At one point in history, a distinct group of Oscan-speaking tribes from Samnium (in south-central Italy), the Samnites, moved down into Campania. Since the Samnites were more warlike than the other Oscan populations, they easily took over the cities of Capua and Cumae, in an area which was one of the most prosperous and fertile in the Italian Peninsula at the time. During the 340s BC, the Samnites were engaged in a war with the Roman Republic in a dispute known as the Samnite Wars, with Rome claiming the rich pastures of northern Campania during the First Samnite War. The First Samnite War was initiated when the Etruscan-influenced Oscan city of Capua (in Etruscan Capeva) was being attacked by the Samnites, and thus appealed to Rome for defensive help.

As the majority of Southern Italy was under Roman control at the time, the sole major remaining independent settlement in the region was the Greek colony of Neapolis, and when the city was eventually captured by the Samnites, the Neapolitan Greeks were left with no option but to call on the Romans, with whom they established an alliance, setting off the Second Samnite War. The Roman consul Quintus Publilius Filo recaptured Neapolis by 326 BC and allowed it to remain a Greek city with some autonomy as a civitas foederata while strongly aligned with Rome. The Second Samnite War ended with the Romans controlling all of southern Campania and additional regions further to the south, such as parts of Lucania.

=== Roman period ===
Campania was a full-fledged part of the Roman Republic by the end of the 4th century BC, valued for its pastures and rich countryside. Naples, with its Greek language and customs, made it a centre of Hellenistic culture for the Romans, creating the first traces of Greco-Roman culture. During the Pyrrhic War in 275 BC, the Battle of Beneventum took place in Campania in the Samnite city of Maleventum, in which the Romans, led by the consul Curius Dentatus, were victorious. They renamed it Beneventum (modern day Benevento), which grew in stature until it was second only to Capua in southern Italy. During the Second Punic War in 216 BC, Capua, in a bid for equality with Rome, allied with Carthage. The rebellious Capuans were isolated from the rest of Campania, which remained allies of Rome. Naples resisted Hannibal due to the imposing walls. Capua was eventually starved into submission in the Roman retaking of 211 BC, and the Romans were victorious.

The Last Day of Pompeii – Karl Briullov

With the initial exception of Naples, the region adopted Latin as official language, in that sense gradually replacing the native Oscan and the Greek and the Etruscan still spoken respectively in their colonies of the region, subsequently becoming fully Romanised. As part of the Roman Empire, Campania, with Latium, formed the most important region of the Augustan divisions of Italia, the Regio I Latium et Campania; Campania was one of the main areas for granary. In ancient times Misenum (modern Miseno), at the extreme northern end of the bay of Naples, was the largest base of the Roman navy, since its port (Portus Julius) was the base of the Classis Misenensis, the most important Roman fleet. It was first established as a naval base in 27 BC by Marcus Agrippa, the right-hand man of the emperor Augustus. Roman Emperors chose Campania as a holiday destination, among them Claudius and Tiberius, the latter of whom is infamously linked to the island of Capri. It was also during this period that Christianity came to Campania. Two of the apostles, St. Peter and St. Paul, are said to have preached in the city of Naples, and there were also several martyrs during this time. The period of relative calm was violently interrupted by the epic eruption of Mount Vesuvius in 79, which buried the cities of Pompeii and Herculaneum.

With the decline of the Roman Empire, its last emperor, Romulus Augustus, was put in a manor house prison near Castel dell'Ovo, Naples, in 476, ushering in a period of uncertainty in regard to the future of the area.

=== Feudalism in the Middle Ages ===
The area had many duchies and principalities during the Middle Ages, in the hands of the Byzantine Empire (also referred to as the Eastern Roman Empire) and the Lombards. Under the Normans, the smaller independent states were brought together as part of the Kingdom of Sicily, before the mainland broke away to form the Kingdom of Naples. It was during this period that elements of Spanish, French and Aragonese culture were introduced to Campania. Allegiances with the Muslim Saracens were made in 836, and the Arabs were requested to repel the siege of Lombard troops coming from the neighbouring Duchy of Benevento.

=== The Kingdom ===
==== Norman to Angevin ====
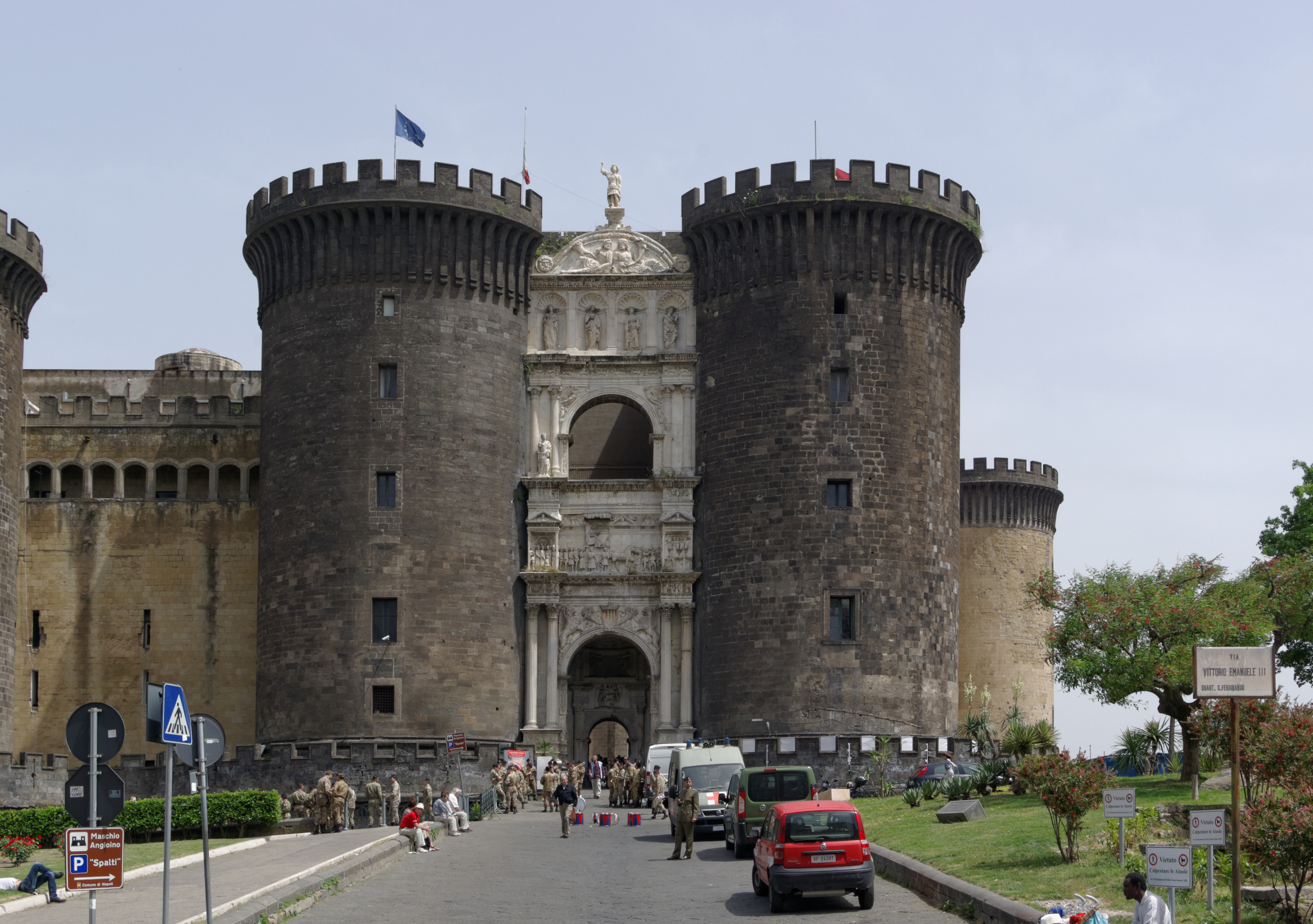
Early kings ruled from Castel Nuovo.

After a period as a Norman kingdom, the Kingdom of Sicily passed to the Hohenstaufens, who were a powerful Germanic royal house of Swabian origins. The University of Naples Federico II was founded by Frederick II in the city, the oldest state university in the world, making Naples the intellectual centre of the kingdom. Conflict between the Hohenstaufen house and the Papacy, led in 1266 to Pope Innocent IV crowning Angevin Dynasty duke Charles I as the king. Charles officially moved the capital from Palermo to Naples where he resided at the Castel Nuovo. During this period, much Gothic architecture sprang up around Naples, including the Naples Cathedral, the main church of the city.

In 1281, with the advent of the Sicilian Vespers, the kingdom split in half. The Angevin Kingdom of Naples included the southern part of the Italian peninsula, while the island of Sicily became the Aragonese Kingdom of Sicily. The wars continued until the peace of Caltabellotta in 1302, which saw Frederick III recognised as king of the Isle of Sicily, while Charles II was recognised as the king of Naples by Pope Boniface VIII. Despite the split, Naples grew in importance, attracting Pisan and Genoese merchants, Tuscan bankers, and with them some of the most championed Renaissance artists of the time, such as Boccaccio, Petrarch and Giotto. Alfonso I conquered Naples after his victory against the last Angevin king, René, and Naples was unified for a brief period with Sicily again.

==== Aragonese to Bourbon ====
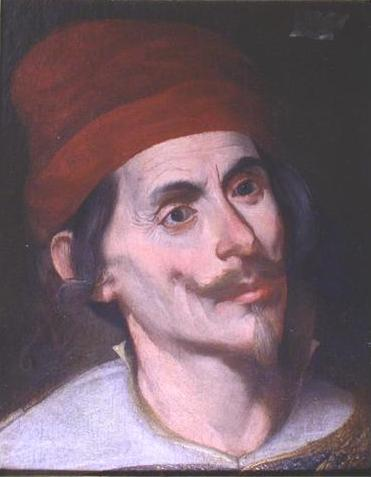
Revolutionary Masaniello

Sicily and Naples were separated in 1458 but remained as dependencies of Aragon under Ferrante. The new dynasty enhanced Naples' commerce by establishing relations with the Iberian Peninsula. Naples also became a centre of the Renaissance, with artists such as Laurana, da Messina, Sannazzaro and Poliziano arriving in the city. During 1501 Naples came under direct rule from France at the time of Louis XII, as Neapolitan king Frederick was taken as a prisoner to France; this lasted four years. Spain won Naples at the Battle of Garigliano and, as a result, Naples then became part of the Spanish Empire throughout the entire Habsburg Spain period. The Spanish sent viceroys to Naples to directly deal with local issues: the most important of which was Pedro Álvarez de Toledo, who was responsible for considerable social, economic and urban progress in the city; he also supported the Inquisition.

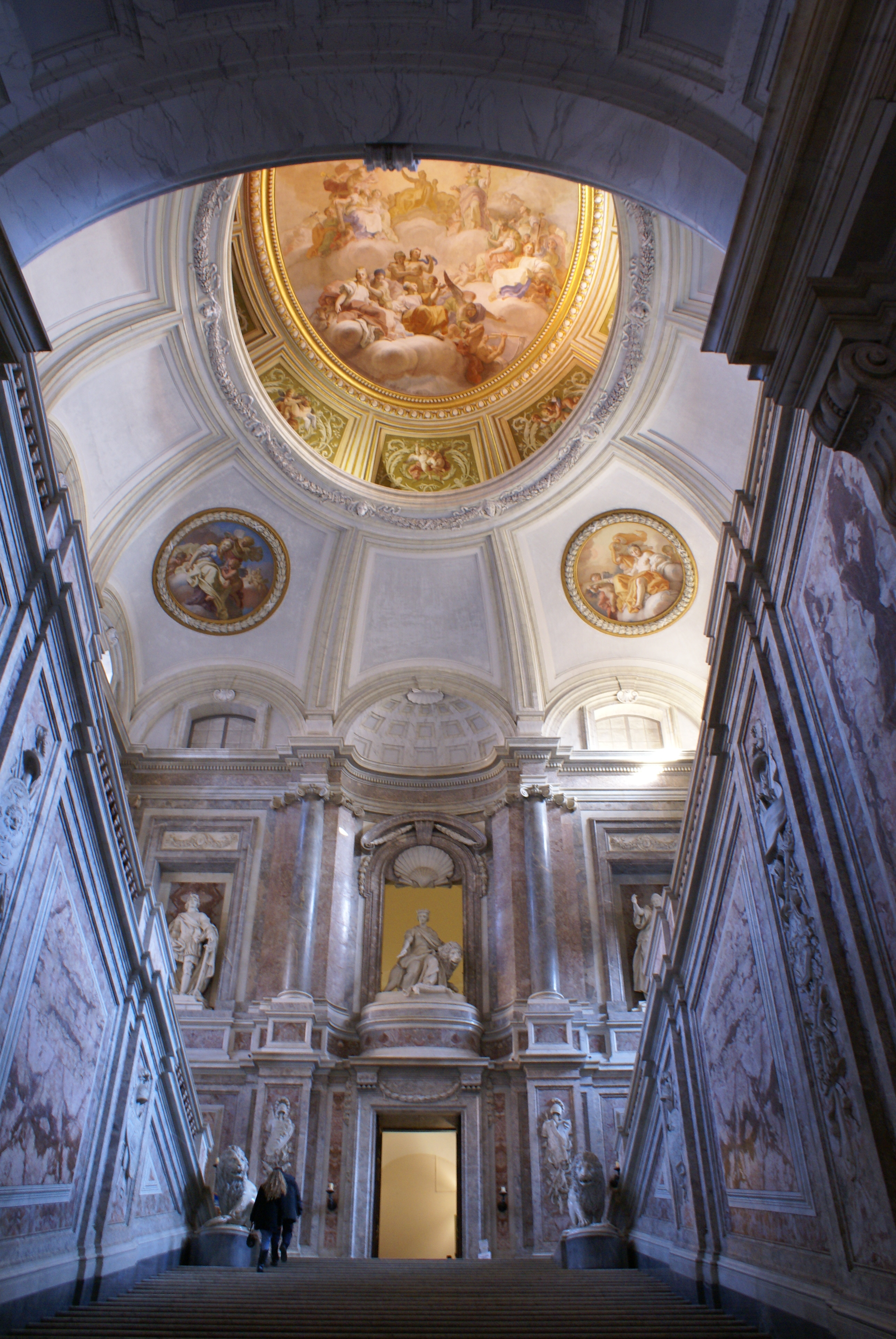
Caserta Palace, inside

During this period Naples became Europe's second largest city after Paris. During the Baroque era it was home to artists including Caravaggio, Rosa and Bernini; philosophers such as Telesio, Bruno, Campanella and Vico; and writers such as Battista Marino. A revolution led by local fisherman Masaniello saw the creation of a brief independent Neapolitan Republic, though this lasted only a few months before Spanish rule was regained. Finally, by 1714, the Spanish ceased to rule Naples as a result of the War of the Spanish Succession; it was the Austrian Charles VI who ruled from Vienna, similarly, with viceroys. However, the War of the Polish Succession saw the Spanish regain Sicily and Naples as part of a personal union, which in the Treaty of Vienna were recognised as independent under a cadet branch of the Spanish Bourbons in 1738 under Charles VII.

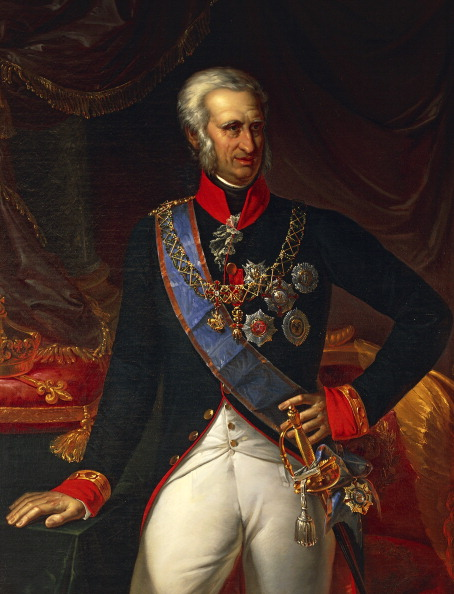
Ferdinand, Bourbon king

During the time of Ferdinand IV, the French Revolution made its way to Naples: Horatio Nelson, an ally of the Bourbons, even arrived in the city in 1798 to warn against it. However, Ferdinand was forced to retreat and fled to Palermo, where he was protected by a British fleet. Naples' lower classes (the lazzaroni) were pious and Royalist, favouring the Bourbons; in the mêlée that followed, they fought the Neapolitan pro-Republican aristocracy, causing a civil war. The Republicans conquered Castel Sant'Elmo and proclaimed a Parthenopaean Republic, secured by the French Army. A counter-revolutionary religious army of lazzaroni under Fabrizio Ruffo was raised; they had great success and the French surrendered the Neapolitan castles and were allowed to sail back to Toulon.

Ferdinand IV was restored as king; however, after only seven years Napoleon conquered the kingdom and instated Bonapartist kings including his brother Joseph Bonaparte. With the help of the Austrian Empire and allies, the Bonapartists were defeated in the Neapolitan War and Bourbon Ferdinand IV once again regained the throne and the kingdom. The Congress of Vienna in 1815 saw the kingdoms of Naples and Sicily combined to form the Two Sicilies, with Naples as the capital city. Naples became the first city on the Italian peninsula to have a railway in 1839, there were many factories throughout the kingdom making it a highly important trade centre.

=== World War II ===
In September 1943, Salerno was the scene of Operation Avalanche and suffered a great deal of damage. From 12 February to 17 July 1944, it hosted the Government of Marshal Pietro Badoglio. In those months Salerno was the temporary "Capital of the Kingdom of Italy", and the King Victor Emmanuel III lived in a mansion in its outskirts. Salerno received the first "Tricolore" in an official ceremony on 7 January 2012 from the premier Mario Monti, to celebrate the glorious story of Italy and its old capitals.

== Geography ==
Campania has an area of 13,670.95 km^{2} (5,278 sq mi) and a coastline of 500 km (311 mi) on the Tyrrhenian Sea. Campania is famous for its gulfs (Naples, Salerno and Policastro) as well as for three islands (Capri, Ischia and Procida).

Four other regions border Campania; Lazio to the northwest, Molise to the north, Apulia (Puglia) to the northeast and Basilicata to the east.

The mountainous interior is fragmented into several massifs, rarely reaching 2,000 m (6,562 ft) (Miletto of 2,050 m (6,726 ft)), whereas close to the coast there are volcanic massifs: Vesuvio (1,281 m (4,203 ft)) and Campi Flegrei.

The climate is typically Mediterranean along the coast with warm, sunny and sultry summers and mild, rainy winters, whereas in the inner zones it is more continental, with lower temperatures in winter and warm summers. Snow is possible at higher elevations but rare at sea level. 51% of the total area is hilly, 34% mountainous and the remaining 15% is made up of plains. There is a high seismic risk across the region.

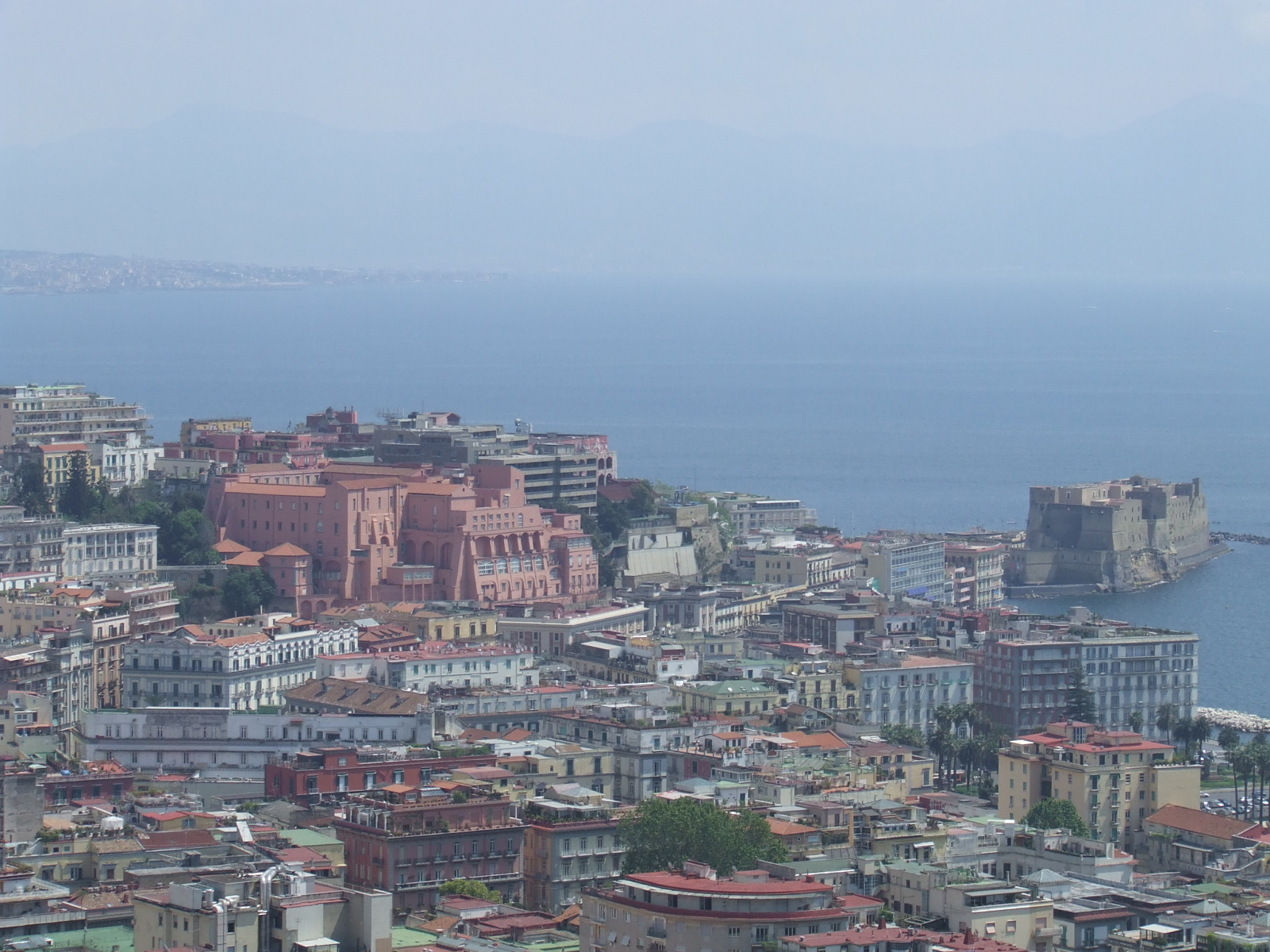
Naples (Nunziatella Military School)

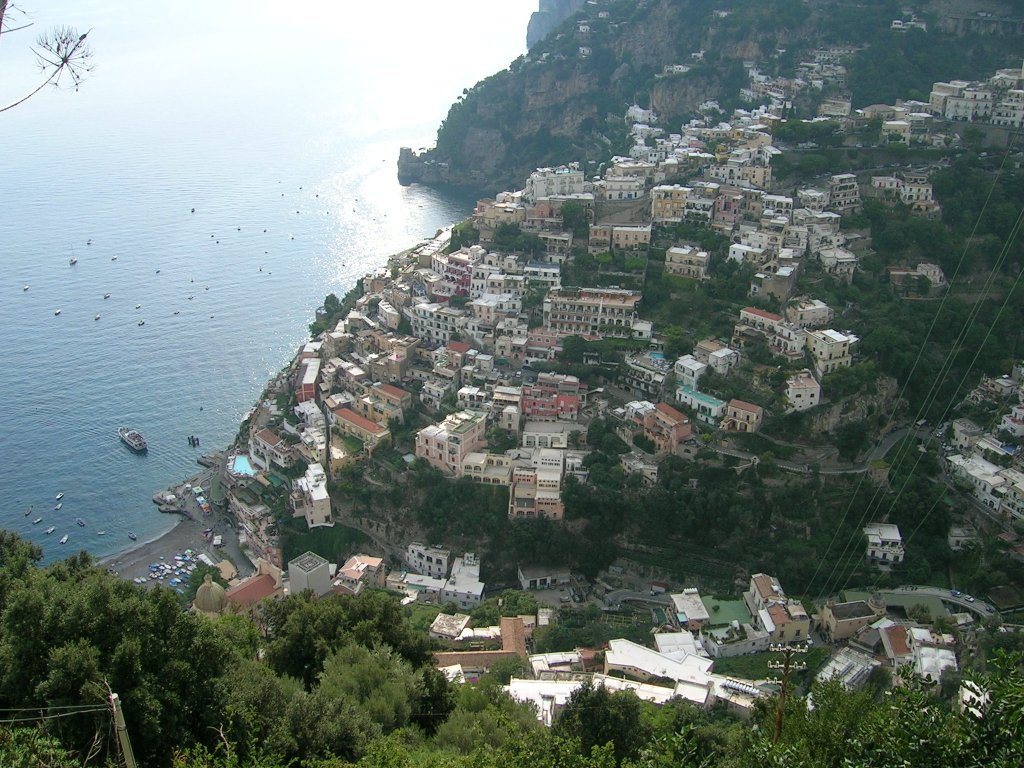
Amalfi Coast (Positano)

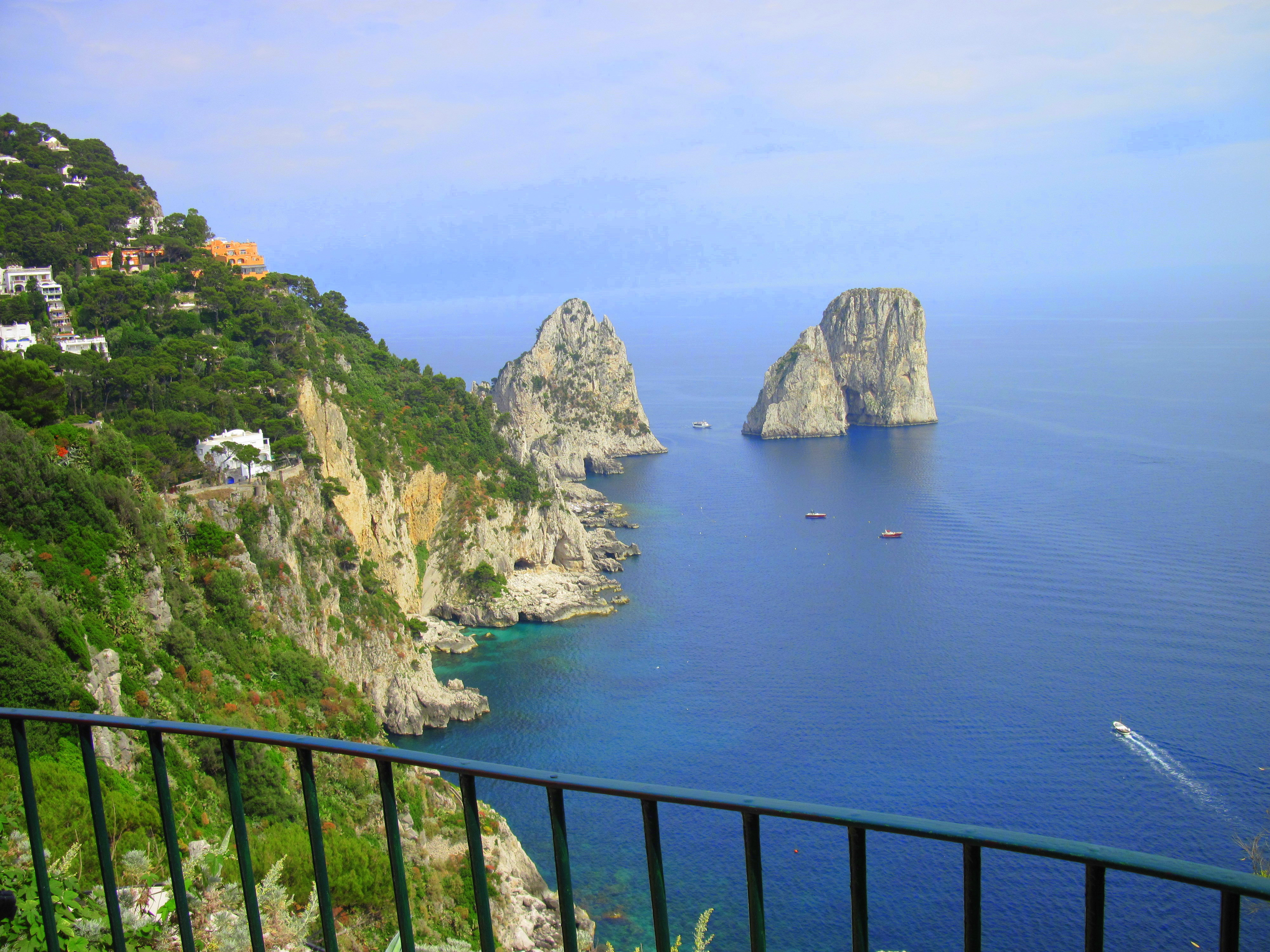
Island Capri

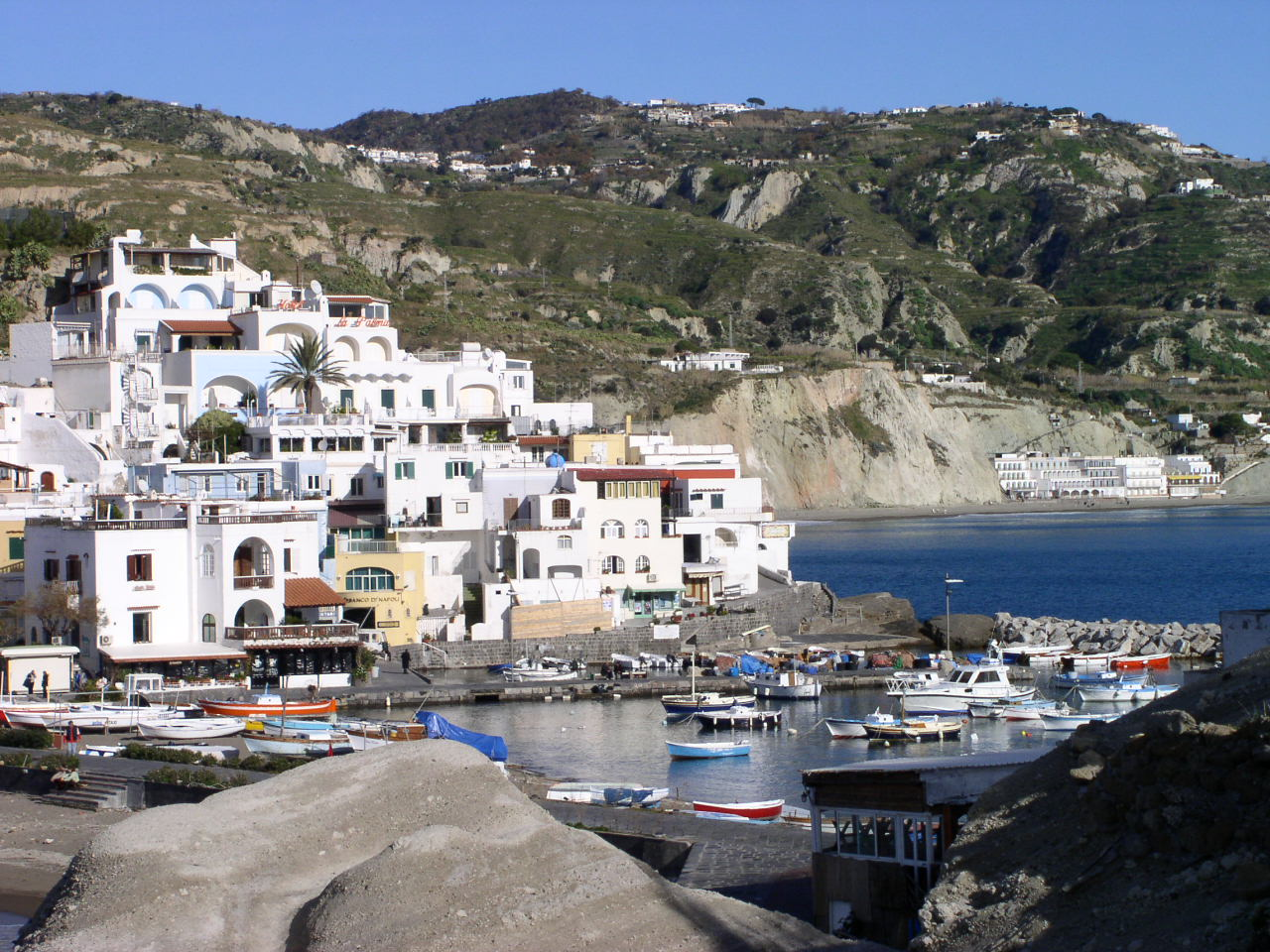
Island Ischia

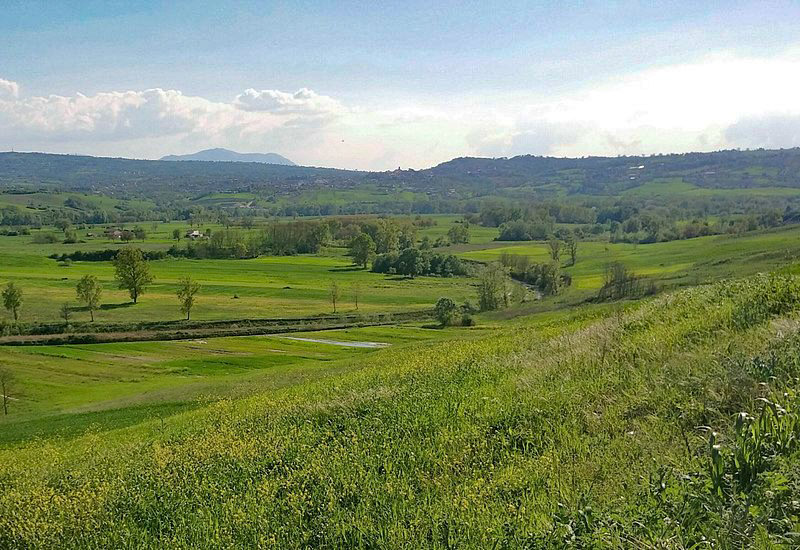
Typical landscape in Province of Avellino, also known as Irpinia

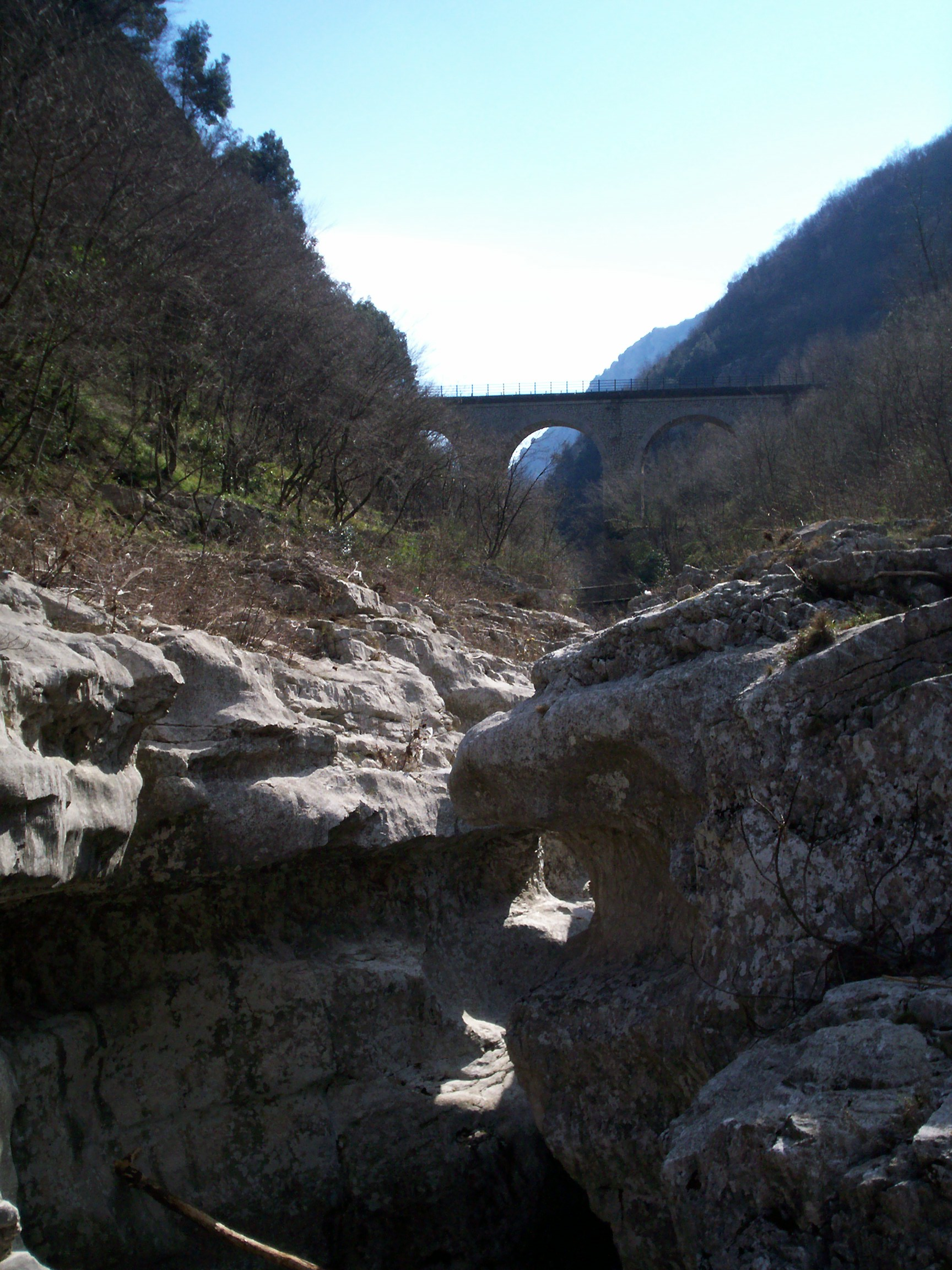
Canyons of Forre del Titerno, Province of Benevento

== Demographics ==
Historical population
Year	Pop.	±%
1861	2,402,355	—
1871	2,520,095	+4.9%
1881	2,659,688	+5.5%
1901	2,914,073	+9.6%
1911	3,101,593	+6.4%
1921	3,343,293	+7.8%
1931	3,508,774	+4.9%
1936	3,696,632	+5.4%
1951	4,346,264	+17.6%
1961	4,760,759	+9.5%
1971	5,059,348	+6.3%
1981	5,463,134	+8.0%
1991	5,630,280	+3.1%
2001	5,701,931	+1.3%
2011	5,766,810	+1.1%
2021	5,624,420	−2.5%
Source: ISTAT

As of 2026, the population is 5,568,703, of which 48.9% are male, and 51.1% are female. Minors make up 16.2% of the population, and seniors make up 21.9%.

Over half of the population is resident in the province of Naples, where there is a population density of 2,506.4 inhabitants per km². Within the province, the highest density can be found along the coast, where it reaches up to 11,900 inhabitants per km² in the municipality of Casavatore.

Inhabitants rarely identify themselves as Campanians. Rather, provinces are what people use to identify themselves with.

=== Immigration ===
As of 2025, immigrants make up 6.1% of the population. The 5 largest foreign countries of birth are Ukraine, Romania, Morocco, Germany, and Switzerland.

Foreign population by country of birth (2025)
Country of birth	Population
Ukraine	44,546
Romania	28,611
Morocco	24,645
Germany	17,645
Switzerland	17,513
Bangladesh	17,137
Sri Lanka	14,343
Albania	9,641
Pakistan	9,479
India	9,200
China	8,916
Venezuela	8,493
Poland	7,929
Nigeria	7,774
Brazil	7,081

Unlike central and northern Italy, in the first decade of the 2000s the region of Campania has not attracted large numbers of immigrants. Part of the reason for this is in recent times, there have been more employment opportunities in northern regions than in the Southern Italian regions.

== Government and politics ==
The Politics of Campania, takes place in a framework of a presidential representative democracy, whereby the President of Regional Government is the head of government, and of a pluriform multi-party system. Executive power is exercised by the Regional Government. Legislative power is vested in both the government and the Regional Council.

The Regional Council of Campania (Consiglio Regionale della Campania) is composed of 60 members, of which 47 are elected in provincial constituencies with proportional representation, 12 from the so-called "regional list" of the elected president and the last one is for the candidate for president who comes second, who usually becomes the leader of the opposition in the council. If a coalition wins more than 55% of the vote, only 6 candidates from the "regional list" will be elected and the number of those elected in provincial constituencies will be 53.

Provinces in Campania.

=== Administrative divisions ===
Campania is divided into four provinces and one metropolitan city:

Province	Population (2026)	Area (km^{2})	Density (inh./km^{2})	Municipalities
Province of Avellino	393,093	2,806.07	140.1	118
Province of Benevento	257,968	2,080.44	124.0	78
Province of Caserta	909,493	2,651.35	343.0	104
Metropolitan City of Naples	2,956,436	1,178.93	2,507.7	92
Province of Salerno	1,053,786	4,954.16	212.7	158

== Economy ==
The GDP per capita in Campania is rank 18 from 20 Italian regions, surpassing only Sicily and Calabria. It is only 66.7% of the Italian average. It has been speculated that a factor could be the failure to connect the region's economy with the rest of Italy, while another factor could be its peripheral position with respect to the developed central areas of Europe.

Overall, Campania appears to be a region with great economic potential, which is partly held back by organized crime (Camorra) and the resulting corruption. The economy of Campania is one of the most affected nationwide by the economic and financial crisis that began in 2008, but between 2015 and 2016 it came out of the recession and began to recover due to, above all, industry, but also tourism and tertiary.

The region, which was characterised until recently by an acute economic contrast between internal and coastal areas, has shown an improvement in the last decade thanks to the development of the provinces of Benevento and Avellino. At the same time, the provinces of Naples, Caserta and in part Salerno, have developed a variety of activities connected to advanced types of services.

=== Tourism ===
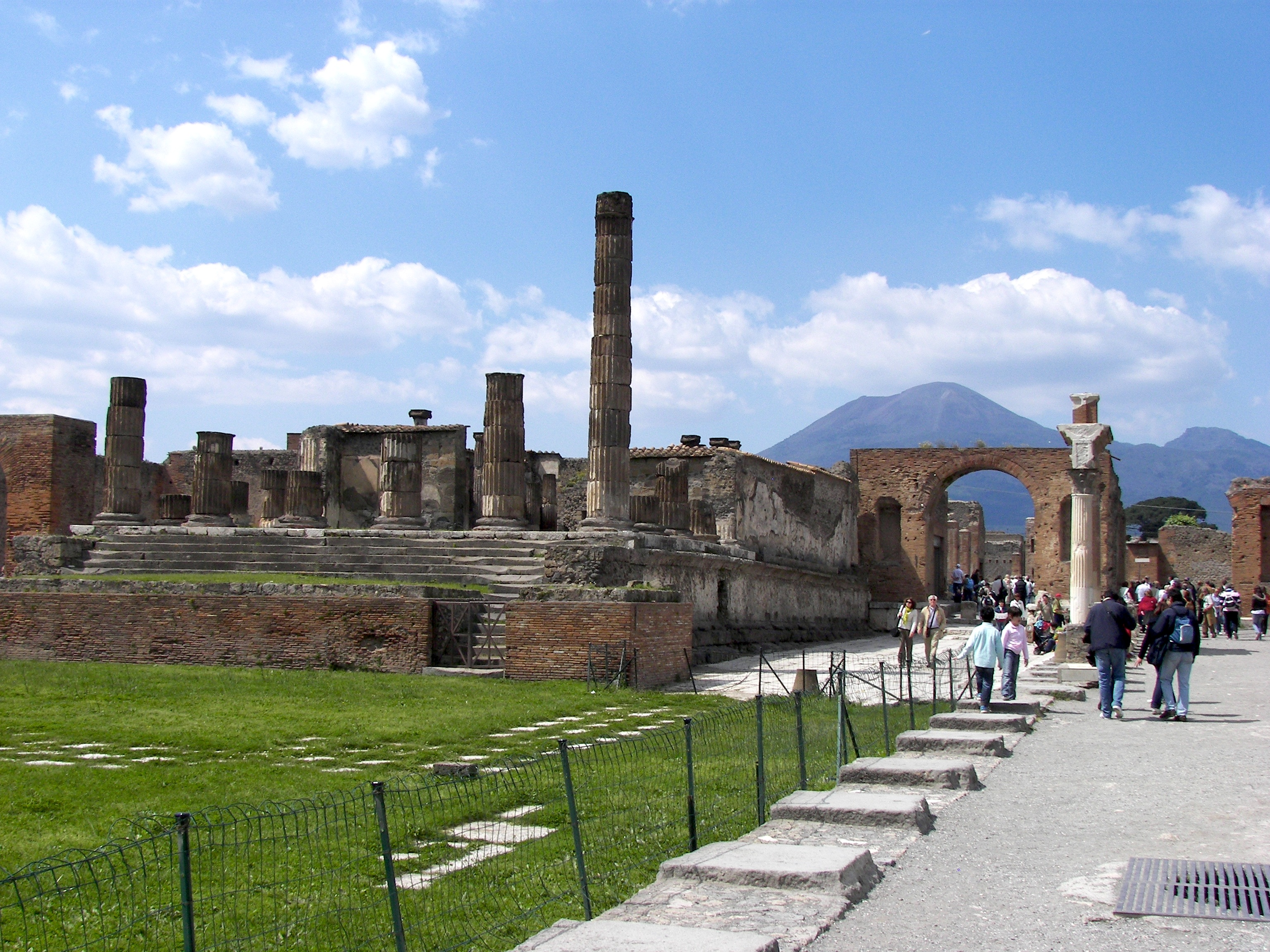
The Forum of Pompeii with Vesuvius in the distance

Tourism is supported by artistic and naturalistic sites that attract visitors annually. In this sector the region finds key economic activity, which allowed it to respond to the recession in 2015. According to 2018 studies by Eurostat, Campania is among the 20 most visited regions in Europe and fifth in Italy after Lombardy, Lazio, Veneto, and Tuscany, as well as first among the southern regions.

The tourist flow sees more than half of the Italian and foreign tourists of the entire region gather in the Metropolitan City of Naples. Of all the locations, Pompeii and Herculaneum stand out, two of the most visited archaeological sites in Italy and among the most visited in the world where there is an average of four million tourists a year. Then there are the Campanian Archipelago (Capri, Ischia and Procida, the latter named Italian capital of culture in 2022), Vesuvius and the Sorrento coast; a notable growth in the cruise sector was observed in the Port of Naples.

Tourist data on other sites in Campania show important records that the region holds nationally and worldwide. Among these above all the data relating to Capri (which is the most visited minor island in Italy and among the most sought after in the world), the Amalfi Coast (which is among the most visited sites in Italy) and finally Vesuvius (the most visited and well-known volcano in the world). There is also a growing influx of tourists to Cilento (Paestum and Certosa di Padula.

Campania has many small and picturesque villages, 11 of them have been selected by I Borghi più belli d'Italia (English: The most beautiful Villages of Italy), a non-profit private association of small Italian towns of strong historical and artistic interest, that was founded on the initiative of the Tourism Council of the National Association of Italian Municipalities.

=== Decline of heavy industry ===
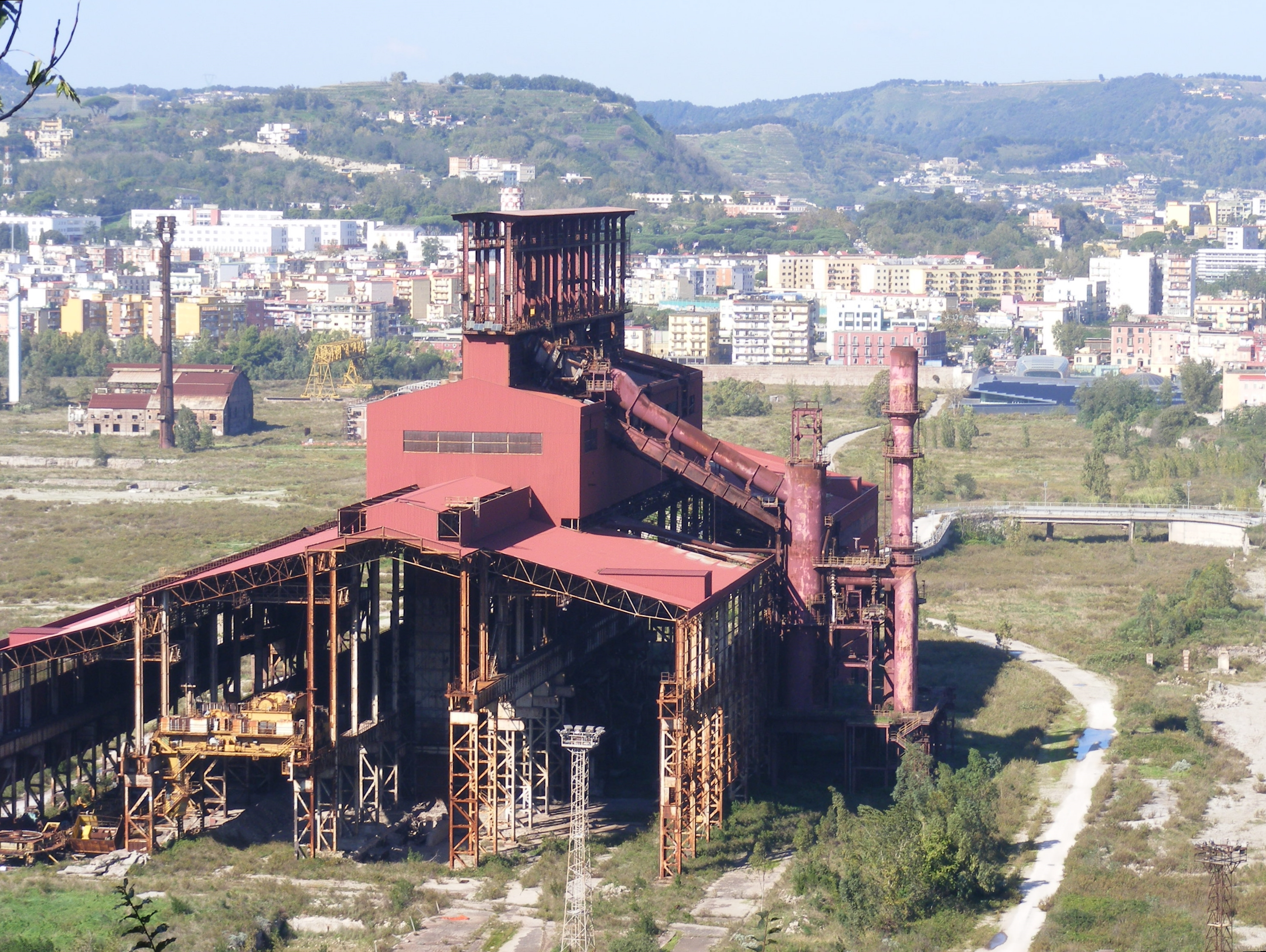
Bagnoli derelict steelworks (2016)

Campania is traditionally the most industrialized region of southern Italy, particularly the Neapolitan territory was one of the most industrialized areas of Italy until the beginning of the 20th century, preceded only by the provinces of the so-called "industrial triangle" (Milan, Turin and Genoa).

In recent decades, the gap with respect to other regions is no longer as significant as it used to be, given that southern regions such as Apulia and Abruzzo have grown considerably economically, while Campania has paradoxically undergone a constant process of de-industrialisation. The symbol of this phenomenon is the reclamation process of the area in Bagnoli where the former Italsider and Eternit operated promoted by the region.

=== Food and agriculture ===
Campania mainly produces fruit and vegetables, but has also expanded its production of flowers grown in greenhouses, becoming one of the leading regions of the sector in Italy. In 2021 the value added of this sector represents around 2.34% of the total value added of the region, equalling €2.2 billion. Campania produces over 50% of Italy's nuts and is also the leader in the production of tomatoes.

Typical products are:

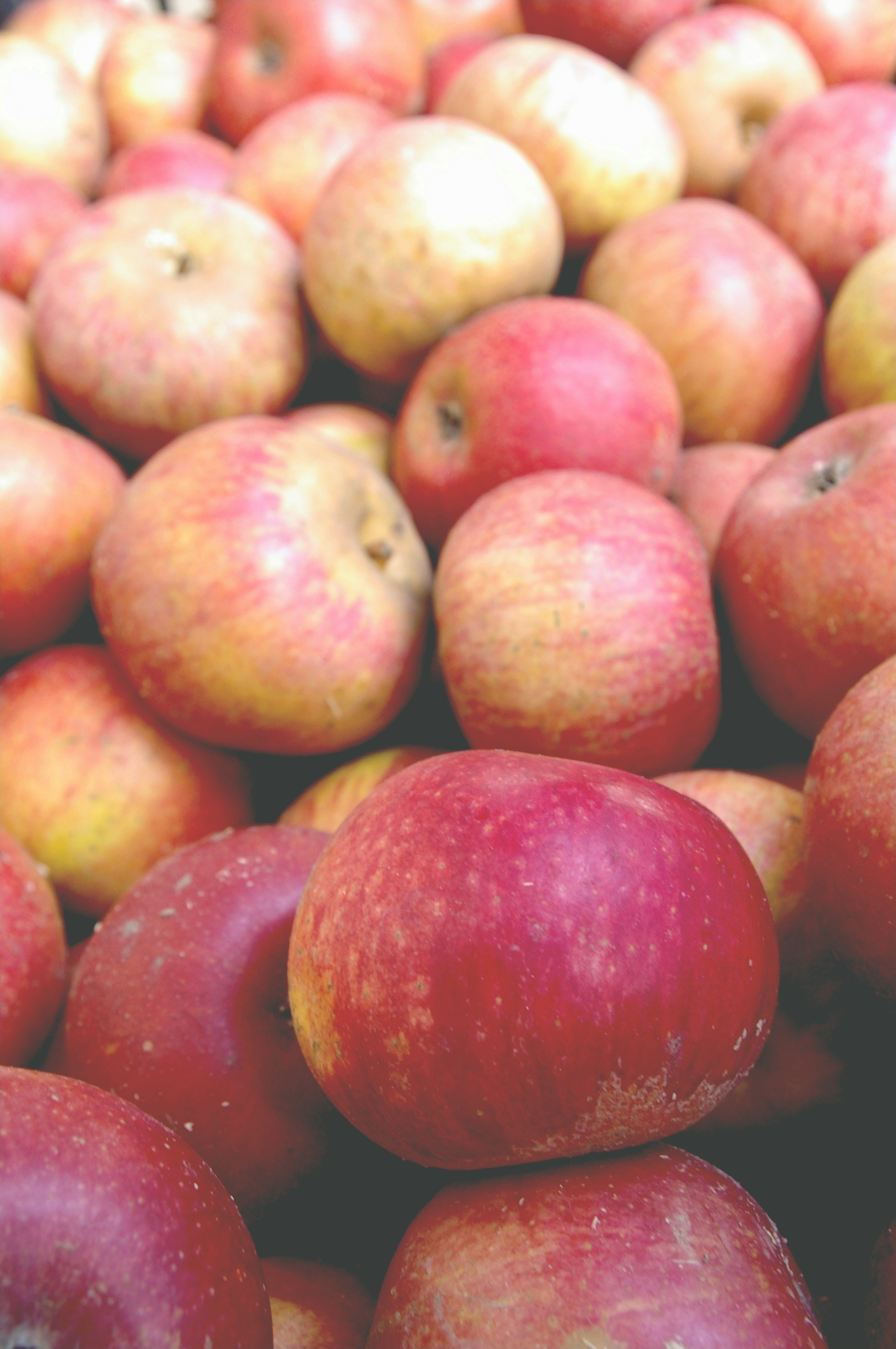
Apple "Annurca" with distinctive ripening process

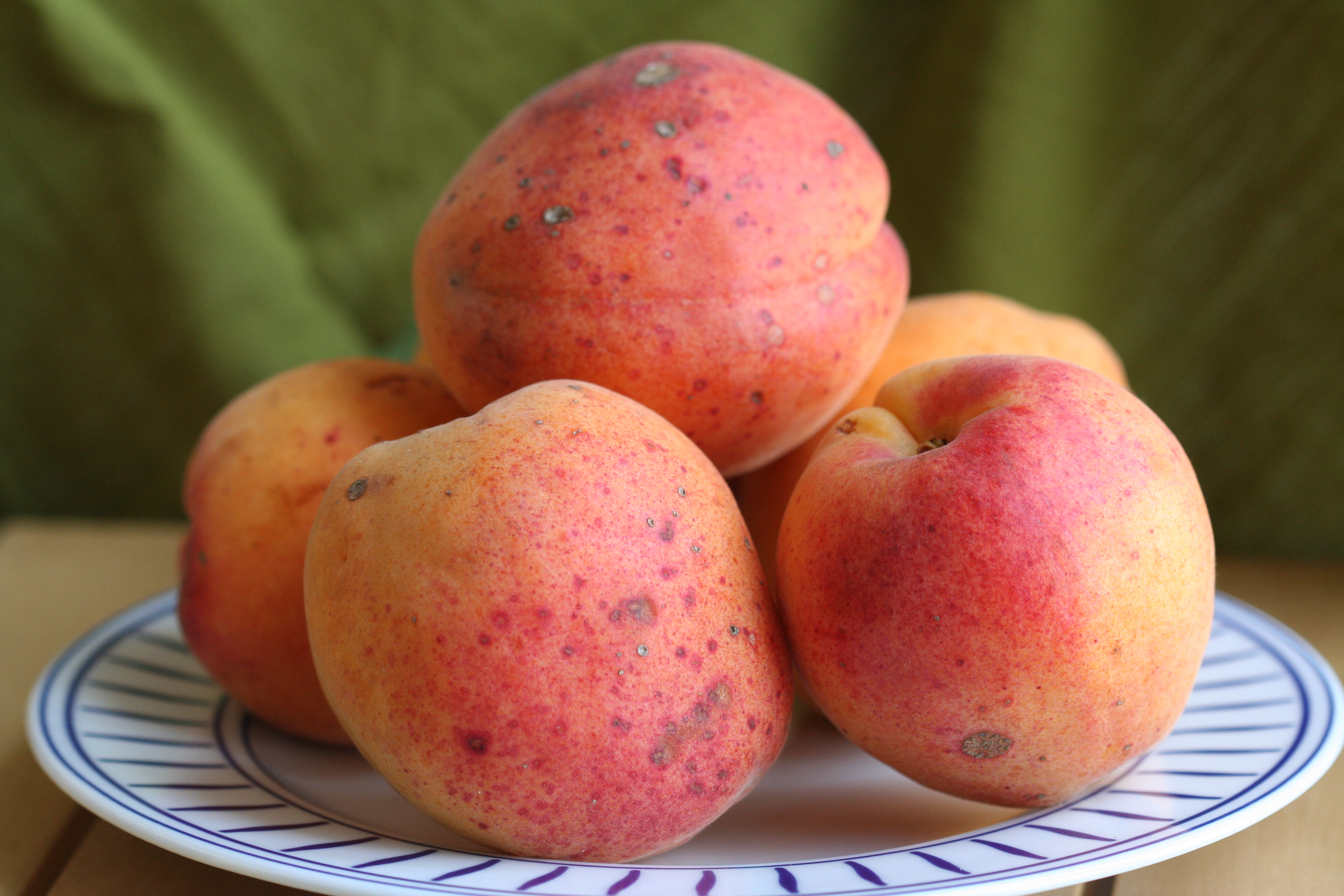
Vesuvian apricot

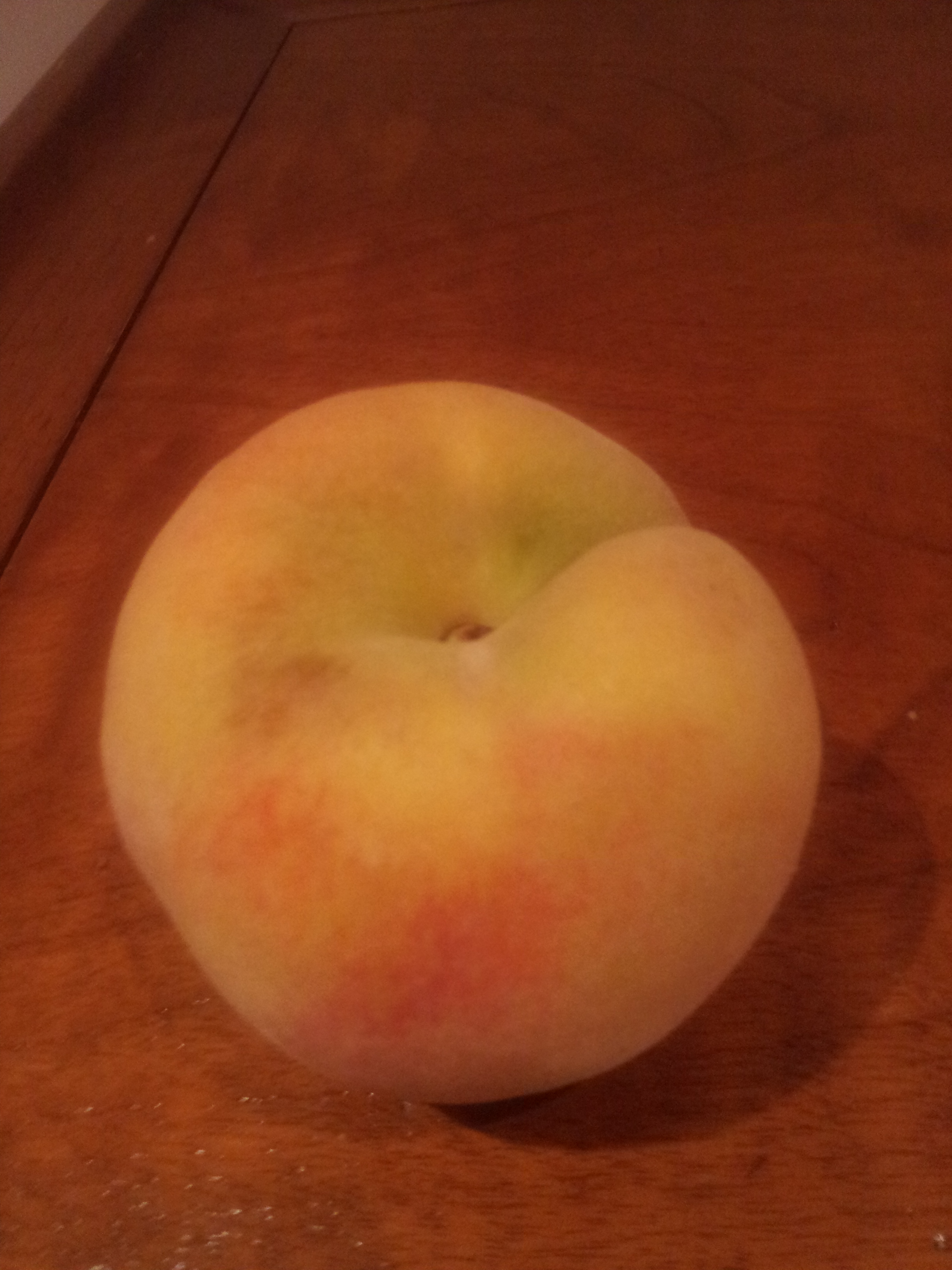
Neapolitan peach

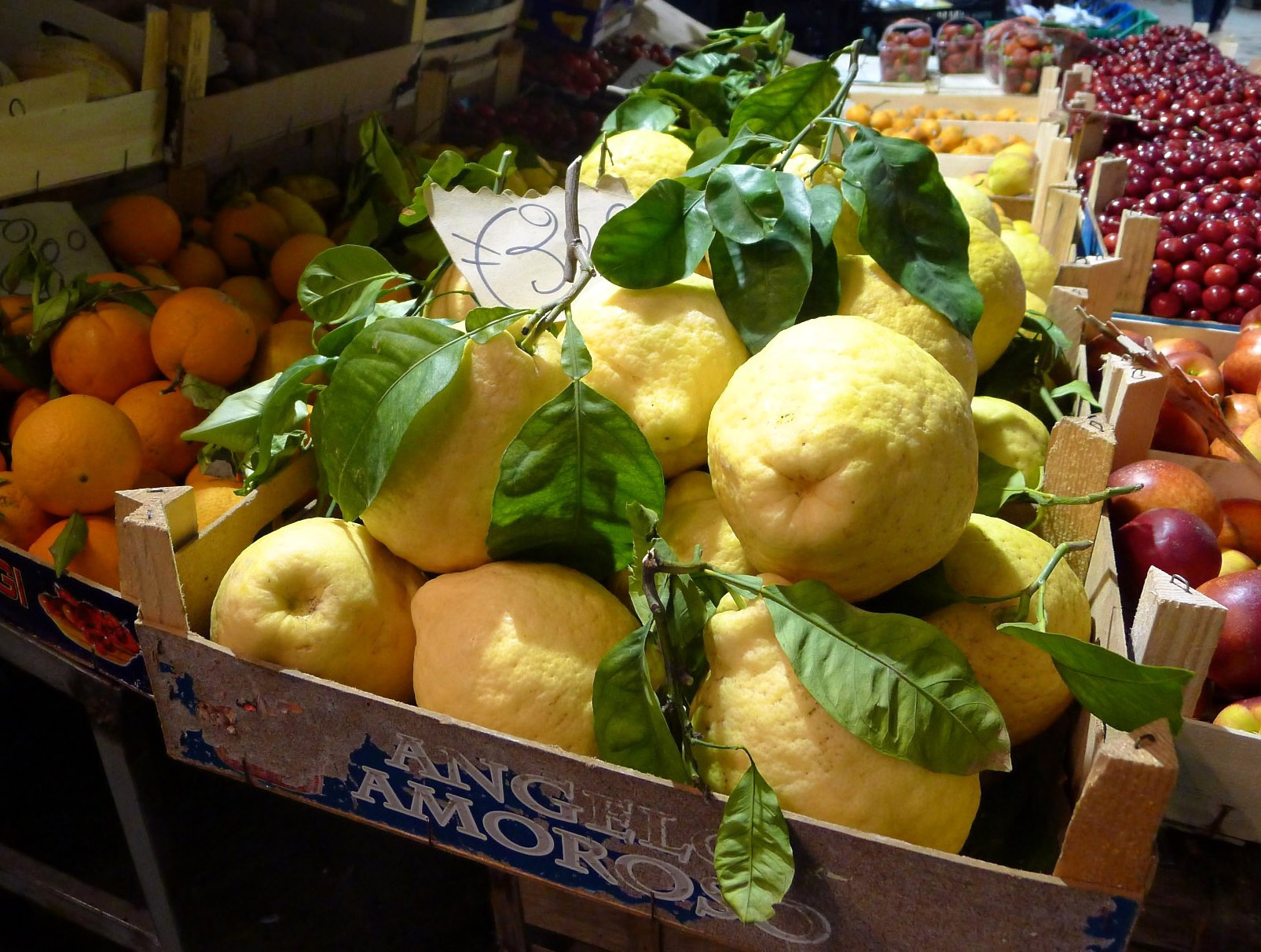
Huge lemon of Sorrento and Amalfi Coast

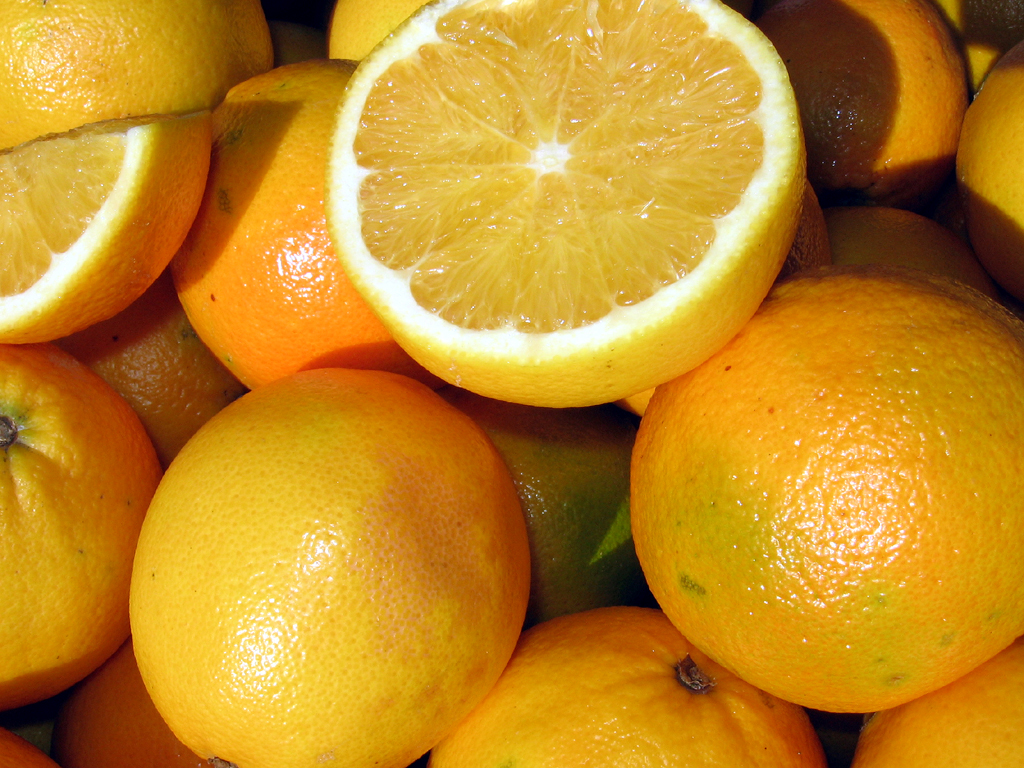
Sorrento orange

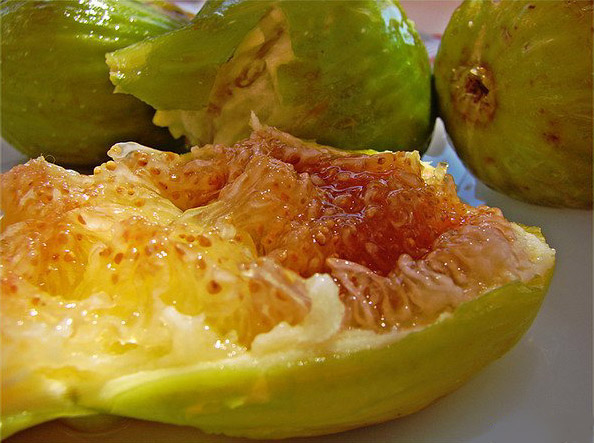
White fig of Cilento

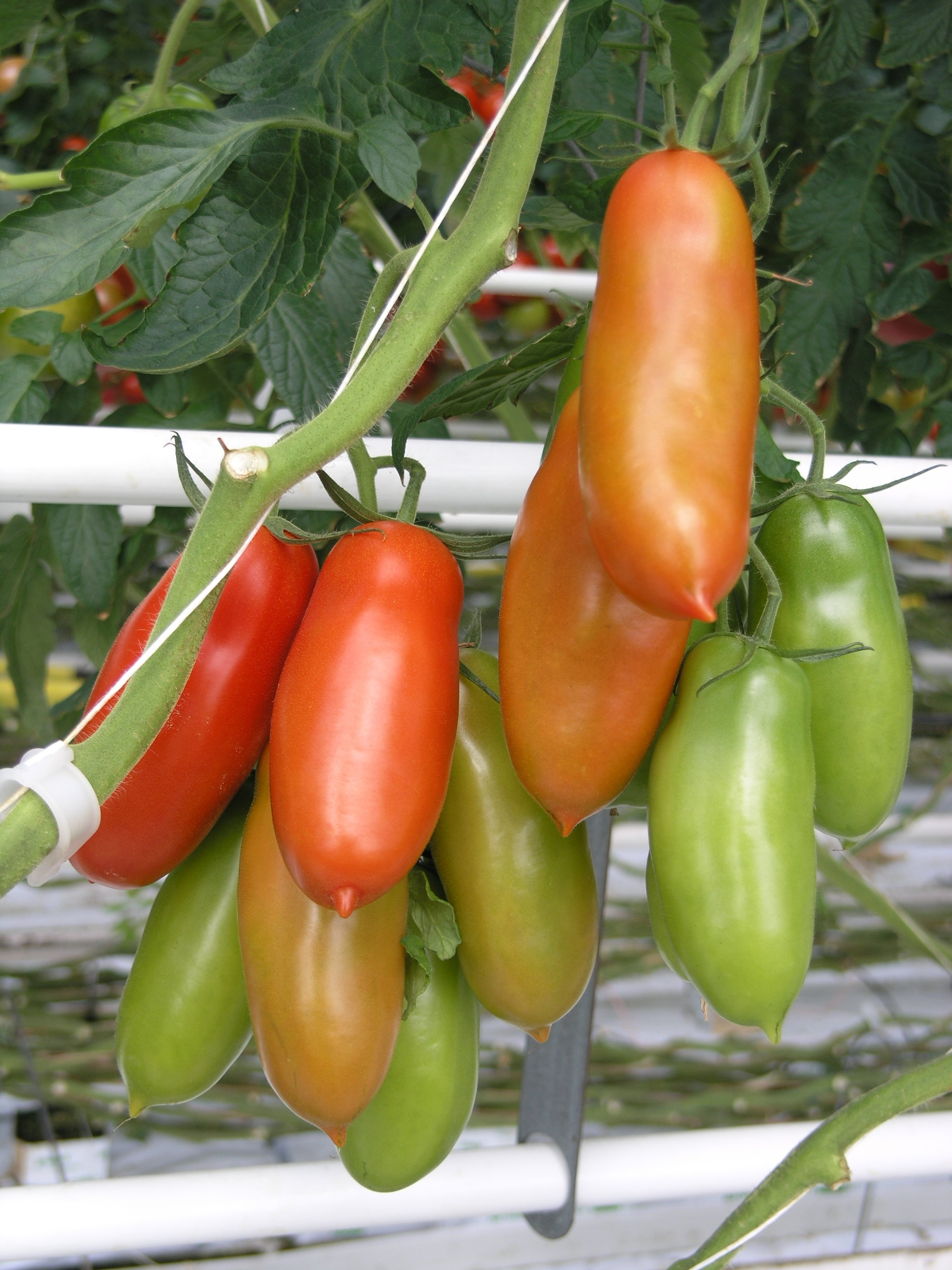
San Marzano tomato

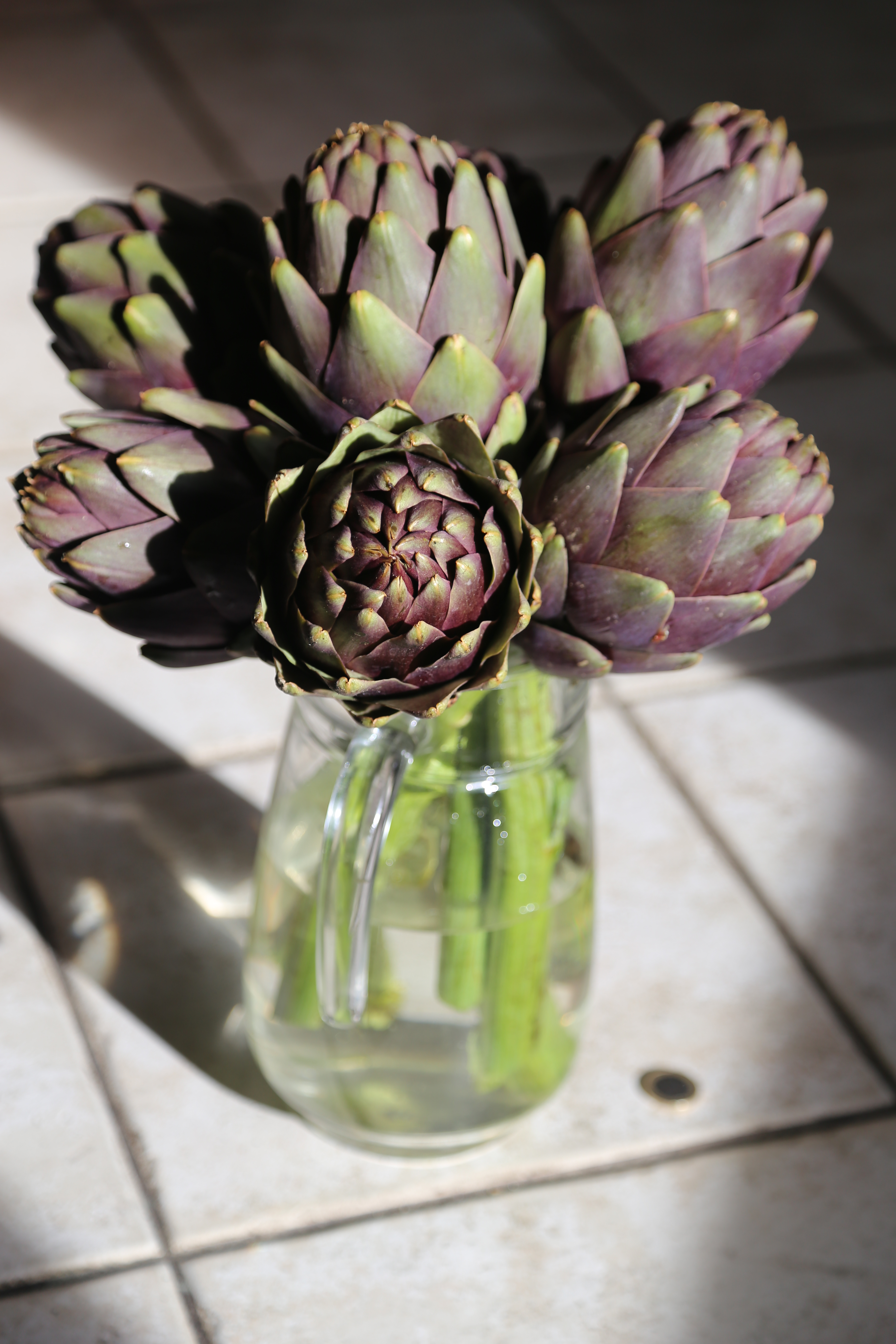
Artichoke of Paestum

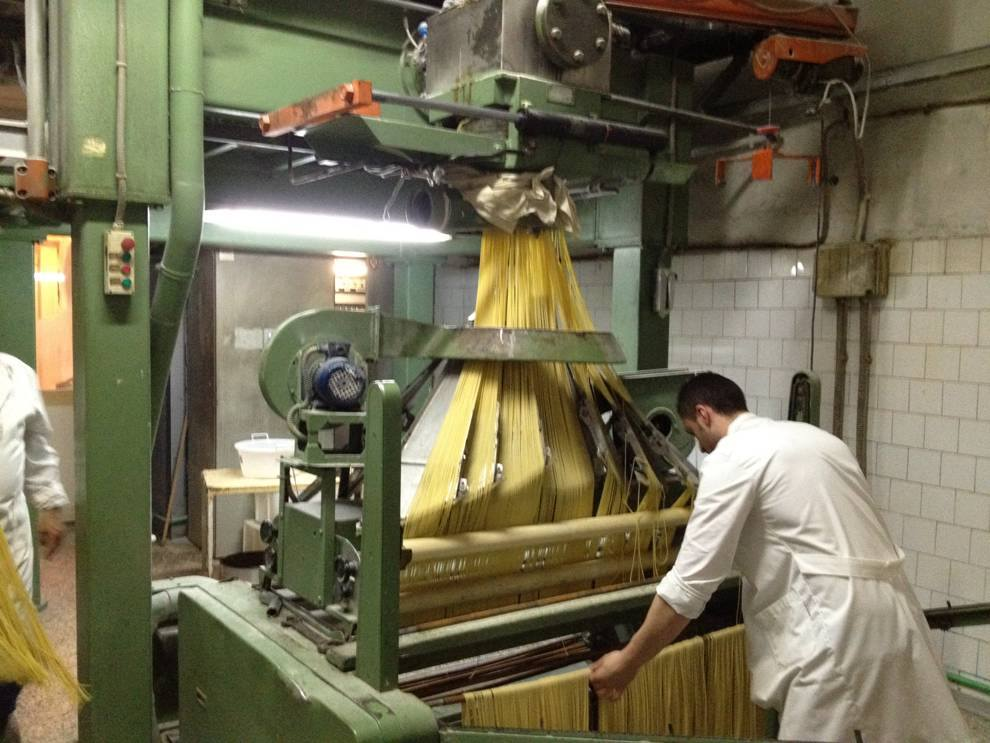
Pasta of Gragnano

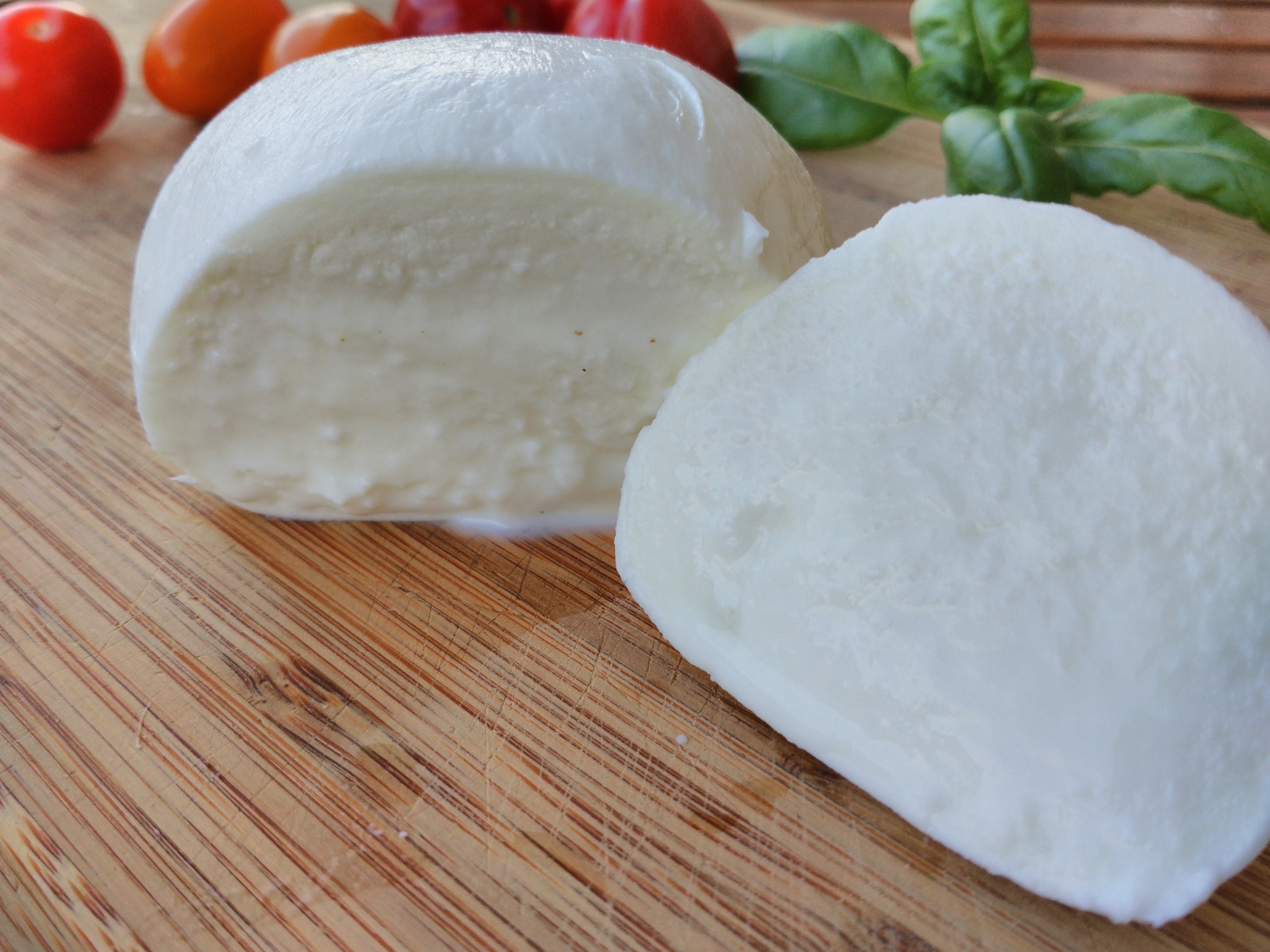
Mozzarella di bufala

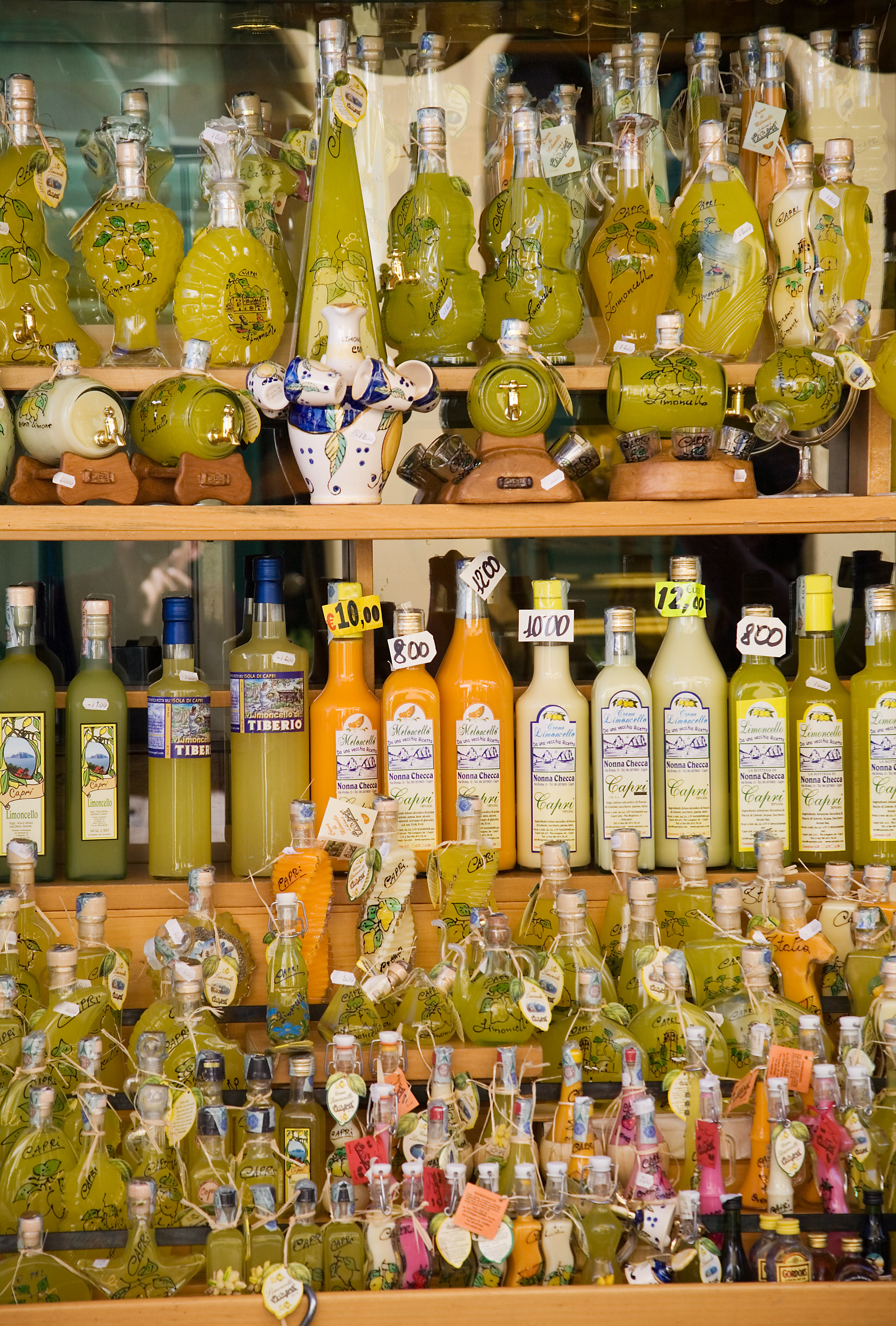
Liqueur "Limoncello"

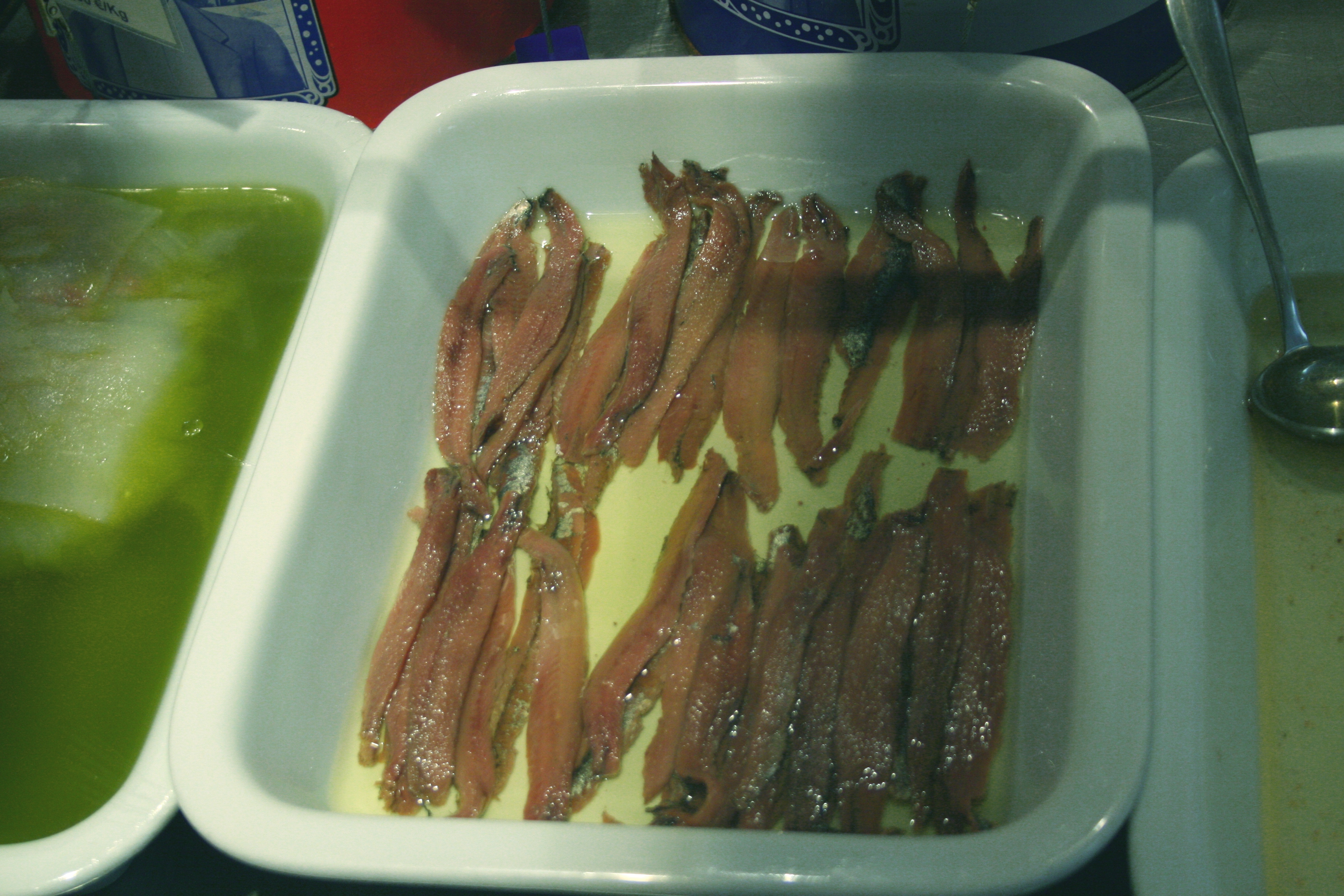
Anchovy

A distinctive point of regional agriculture in the breeding of buffalos. The milk is used to produce mozzarella di bufala.

Olive trees, mainly of the varieties Carpellese (PDO designated), Cornia (Val di Cornia DOC), Frantoio, Leccino, Ogliarola Barese, Olivella, Ortice, Pisciottana (Also Ogliastrina or Olivo dell'Ascea), Ravece (also known as Rotondello), and Salella, cover over 74,604 hectares (184,350 acres).

Vineyards cover 41,129 ha, but only ca. 5,100 ha using to produce quality wine of DOC and DOCG types. There are 4 DOCG wines: Aglianico del Taburno (red and rose), Fiano di Avellino (white), Greco di Tufo (white and sparkling) and Taurasi (red). Wine production has increased as well as the quality of the wine.

There is a problem with illegal toxic waste dump in the Triangle of death north of Naples between Acerra, Nola and Marigliano. In the region, over 12,000 cattle, river buffaloes and sheep had been culled before 2006. High levels of mortality and abnormal foetuses were also recorded in farms in Acerra linked to elevated levels of dioxin. Local studies have shown higher than permissible levels of lead in vegetables grown in the area. The government blames the Mafia's illegal garbage disposal racket. In samples of milk, which is using to produce mozzarella di bufala, found cancerogenic dioxins. In Naples-Bagnoli is an asbestos contamination from former Eternit cement plant. Millions of tons of toxic industrial waste has been dumped in Campania, not only in the Triangle of death, a region once celebrated for the fertility of its soil, but now the local population have been exposed to land contaminated with waste. This includes highly dangerous materials such as asbestos, zinc, lead, germanium, arsenic, mercury, cadmium, chromium, dioxins, and uranium. Blood tests of people living in Campania show alarming levels of dioxins.

=== Automotive ===
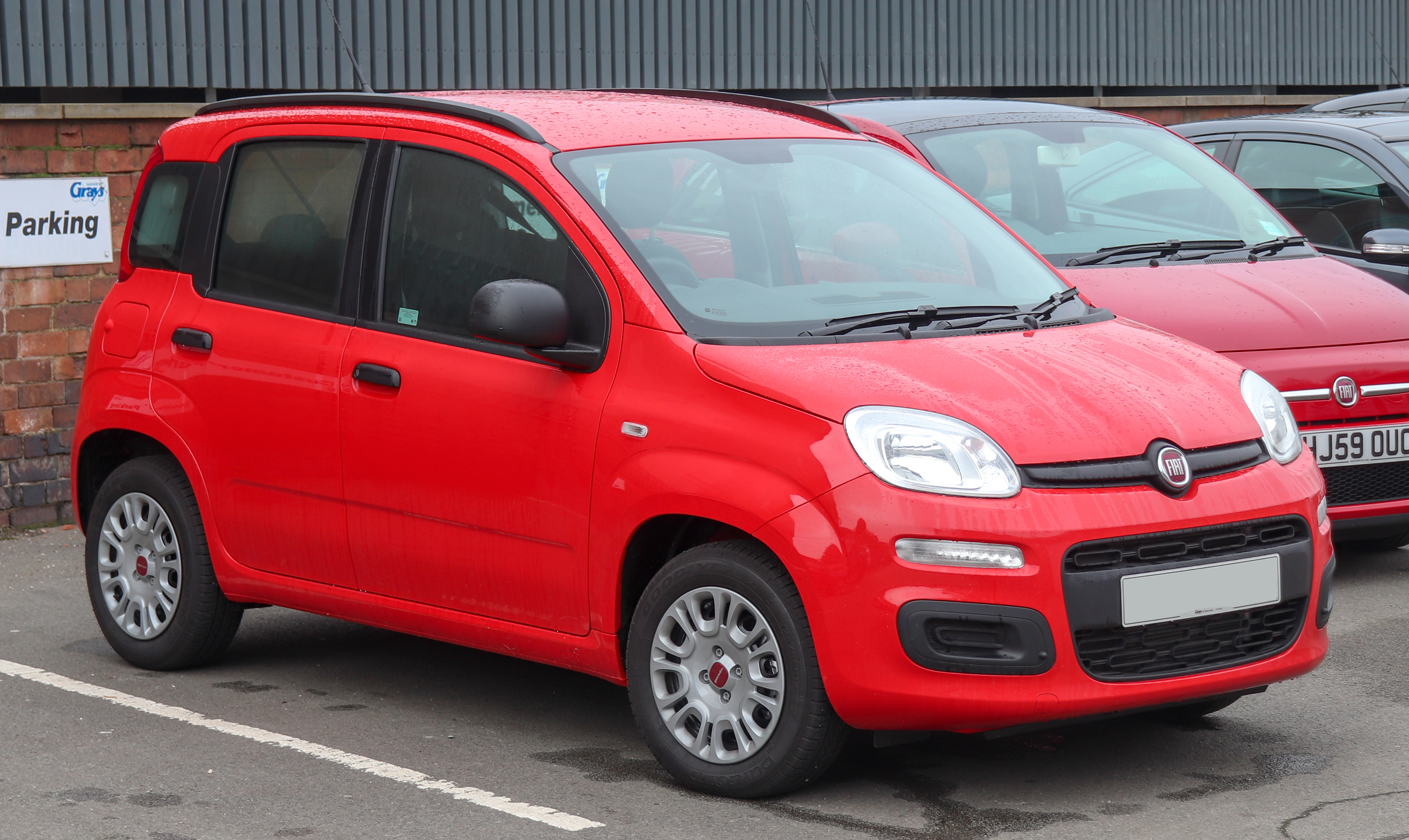
Fiat Panda III

Campania had a massive automotive industrial production till 2011, focused on Alfa Romeo. Production of Alfa Romeo was reduced and relocated to a plant in Cassino near Rome. Currently only one low-level Fiat Panda model is produced in facilities located in Pomigliano d'Arco in the Naples metropolitan area (140,478 units in 2020). A FIAT plant manufacturing engines is in Pratola Serra, Avellino. There are also plants for automotive parts suppliers like Magneti Marelli (exhaust systems) and Denso (engine cooling and air-conditioners). Buses are produced by Industria Italiana Autobus in Flumeri (ex-Irisbus).

=== Aerospace and rail ===
There is also a significant aerospace industry:

- A failed Mars mission named ExoMars in 2016 had a major part of its technology designed in Naples No signal indicating a successful landing was received.
- Also in Pomigliano d'Arco there are a Leonardo plant, which produces the fuselage and tail of ATR planes and an Avio Aero plant, which manufactures parts of gas turbines. Benevento has a Leonardo Helicopters plant (aluminum and magnesium castings)
- Radars for military and air traffic control applications and components are produced by two other Leonardo establishments in Giugliano in Campania and Bacoli
- Vulcanair in Casoria manufactures light aircraft
- Seekers for missiles are made in Bacoli-Fusaro by MBDA
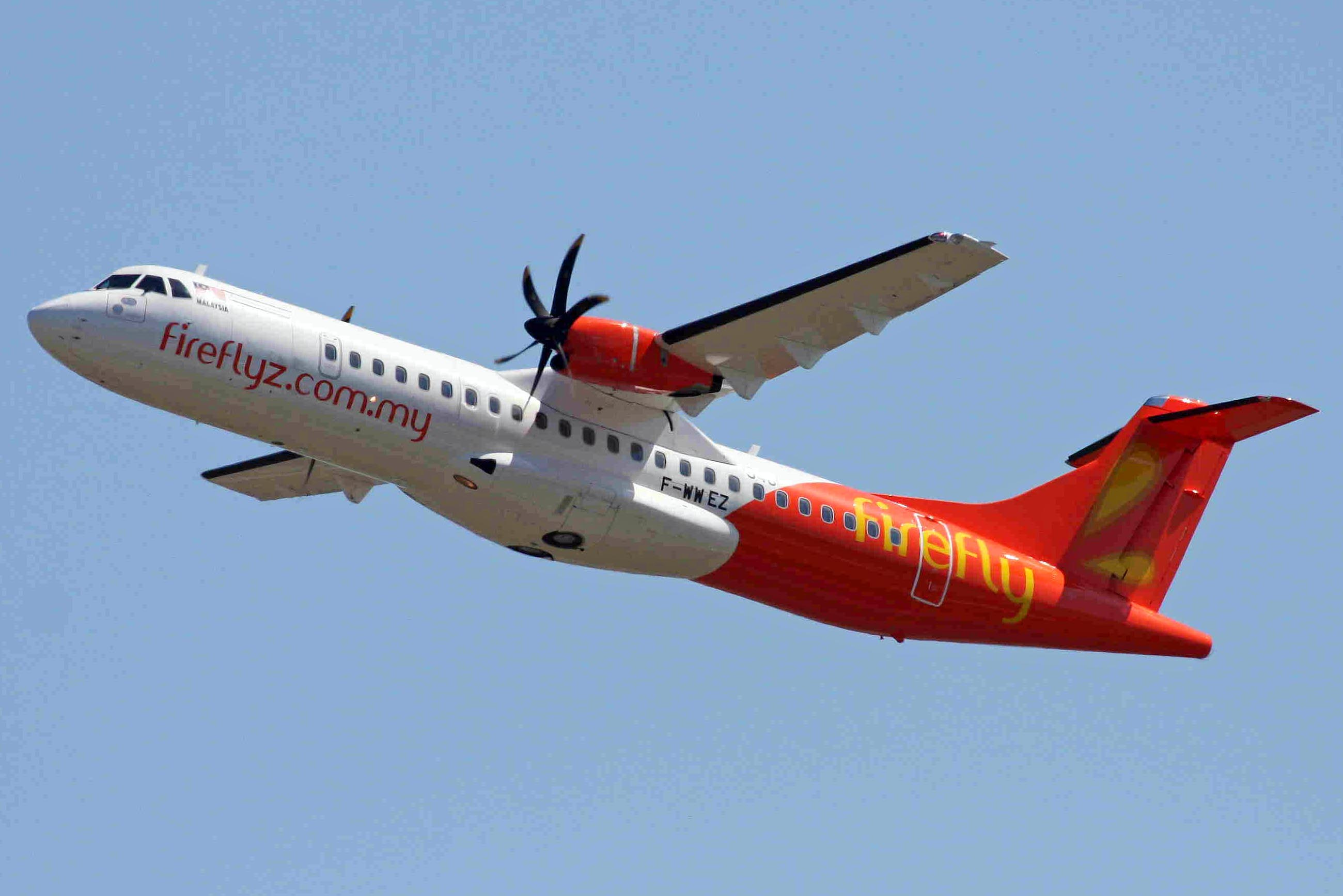
ATR 72

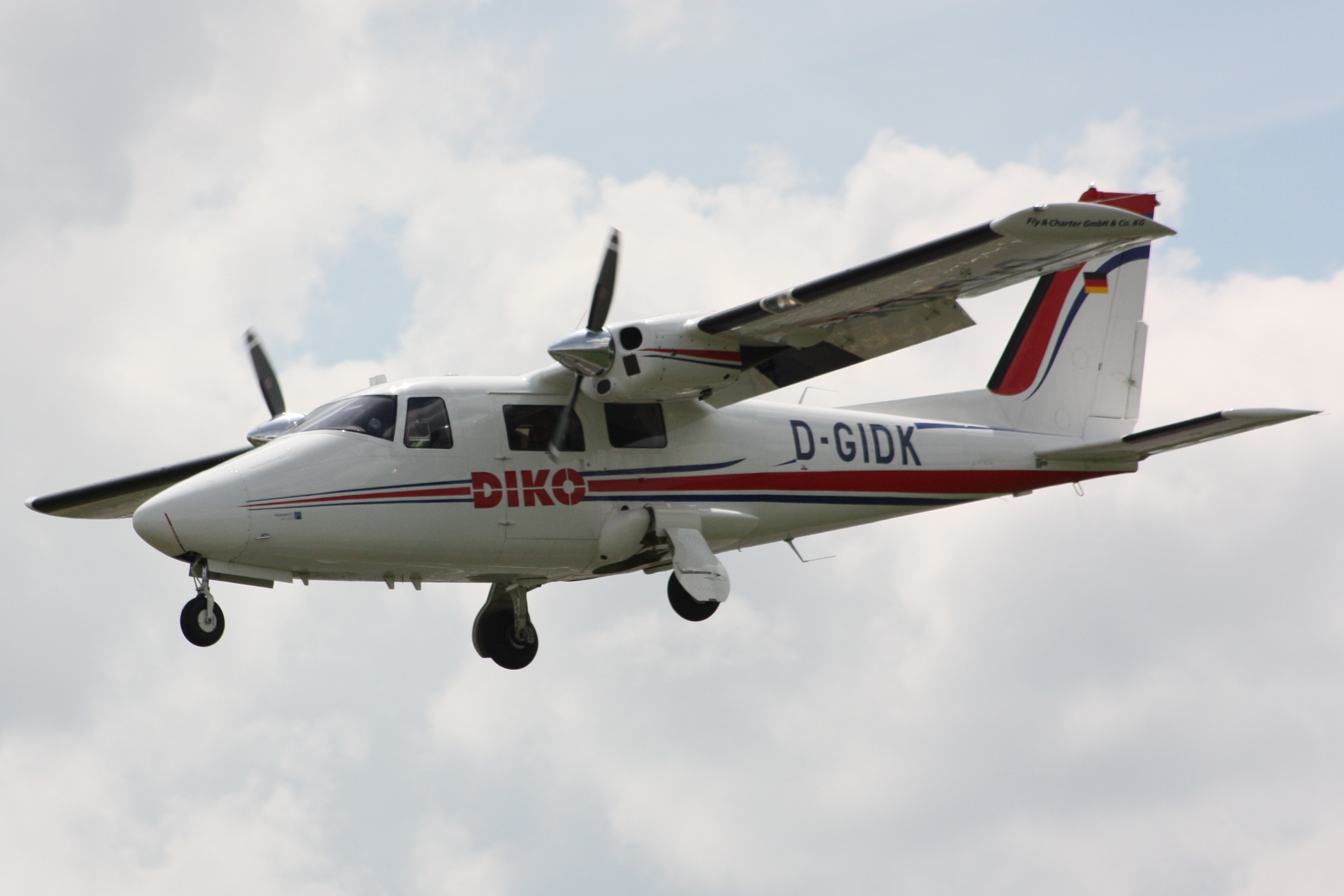
Vulcanair P.68

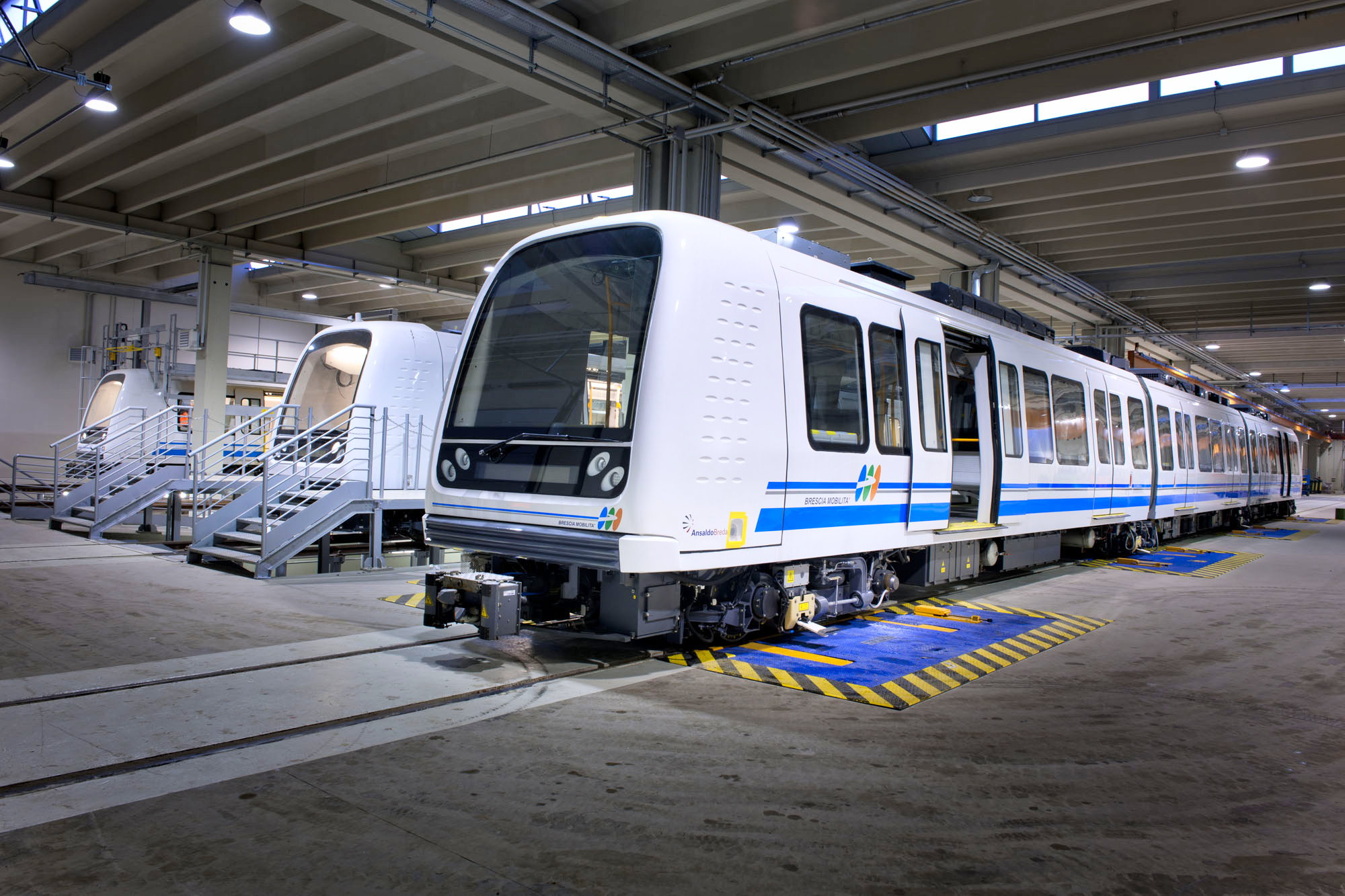
Driverless Metro Brescia

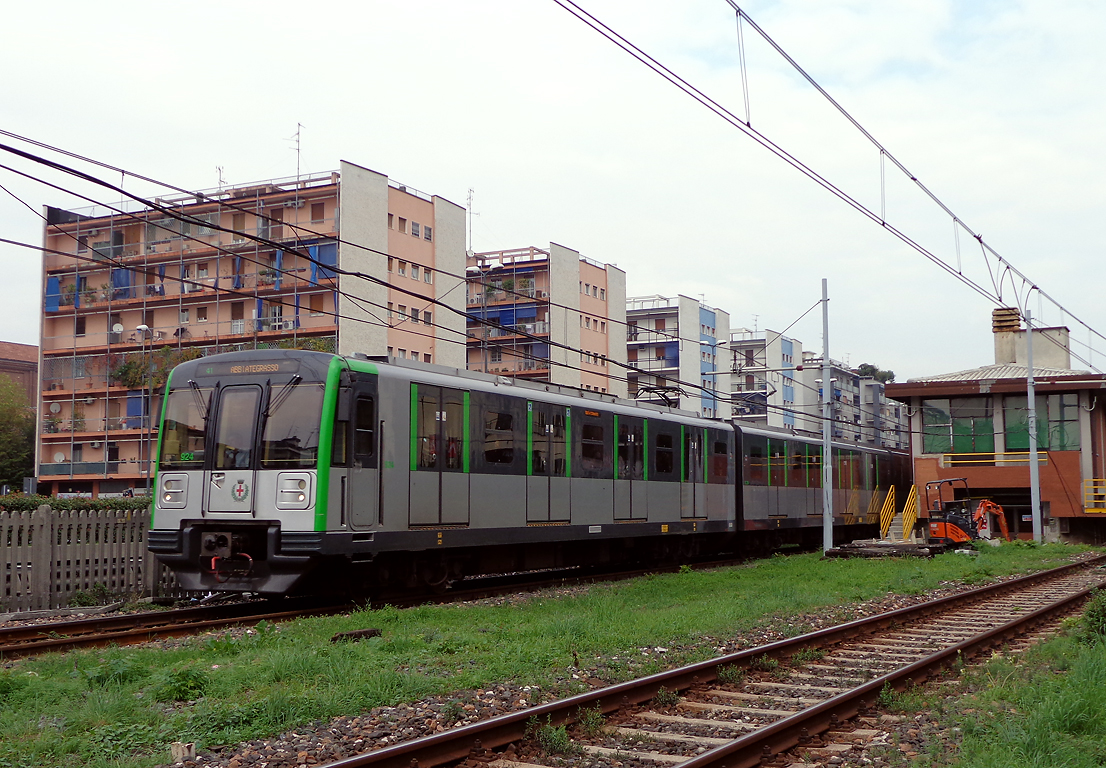
Meneghino Metro Milano

Hitachi Rail Italy has headquarters, manufacturing plant and service facilities in Naples. Here it produces the metro trains Meneghino and Driverless Metro.

=== Fashion ===
Luxury brands like Kiton, Cesare Attolini, Isaia, Rubinacci, Harmont & Blaine, E. Marinella are also located in Campania. All of them are relative small-sized with annual sales of less than 100 million euros each.

=== Other industrial districts ===
There are other industrial districts in Campania:

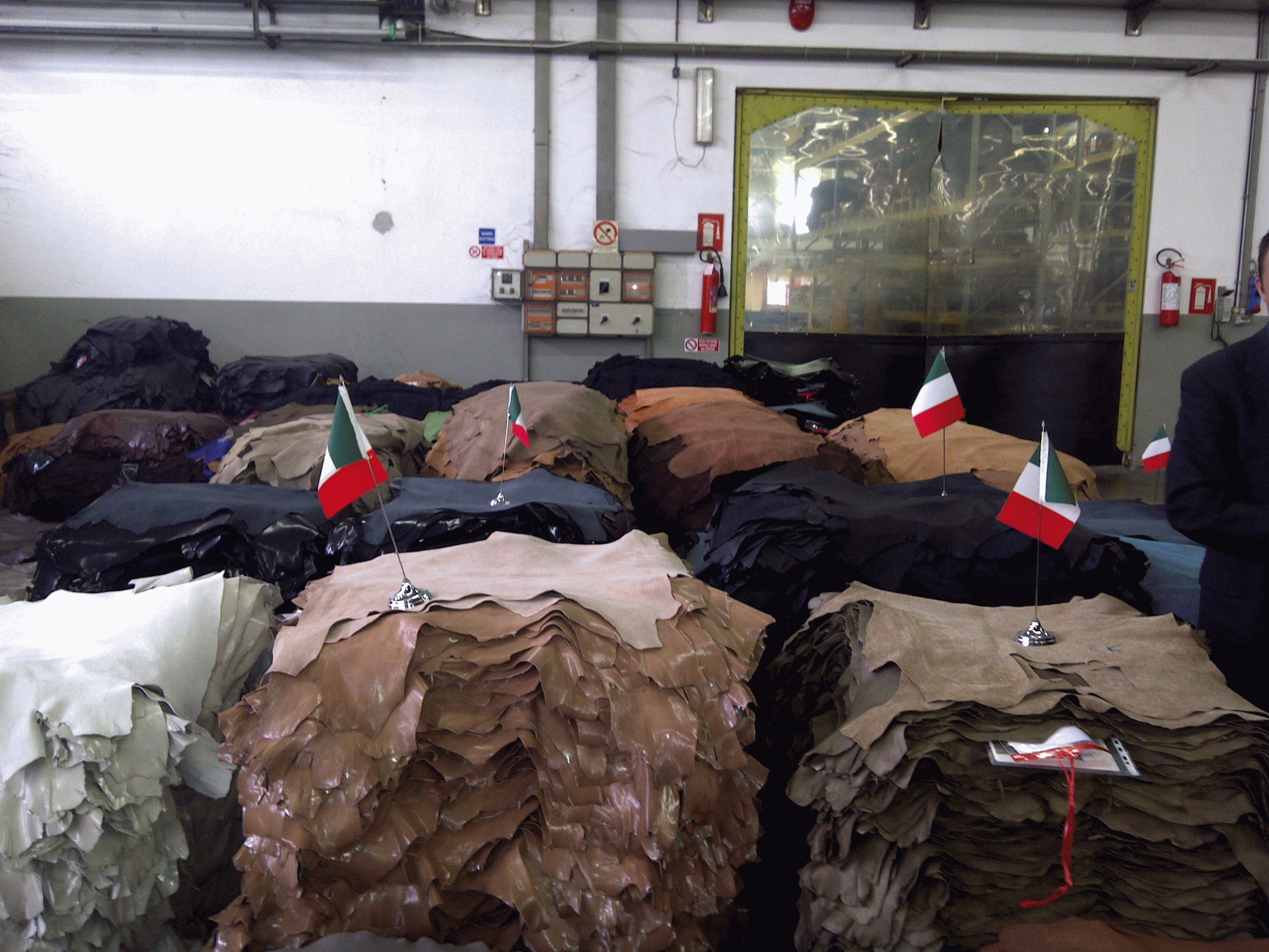
Leather Shop

- Jewelry in Marcianise, one of the four located in Italy. It has 350 companies with ca. 2500 employees, and the annual turnover is 750 million euros. Every two years there is a special fair.
- Coral products, cameos and nacre in Torre del Greco. Since 1989 in Torre del Greco coral fishing is not practised, but the town still remains the most important centre in the world for coral processing, with over 2,000 employees in the sector.
- Leather tanning in Solofra extends over an area of about 60 km^{2} in the south-western area of the province of Avellino, including also Montoro and Serino. This area is specialized in the tanning of sheep and goatskins, for a total of about 400 companies operating in the sector including tanneries, subcontractors and garment manufacturers, 4,000–4,500 employees and an average annual turnover of 1,500 million euros. It specializes in the processing of leathers for clothing, shoes and leather goods.
- Shoe making in Grumo Nevano, Aversa, Trentola Ducenta

=== Transport ===
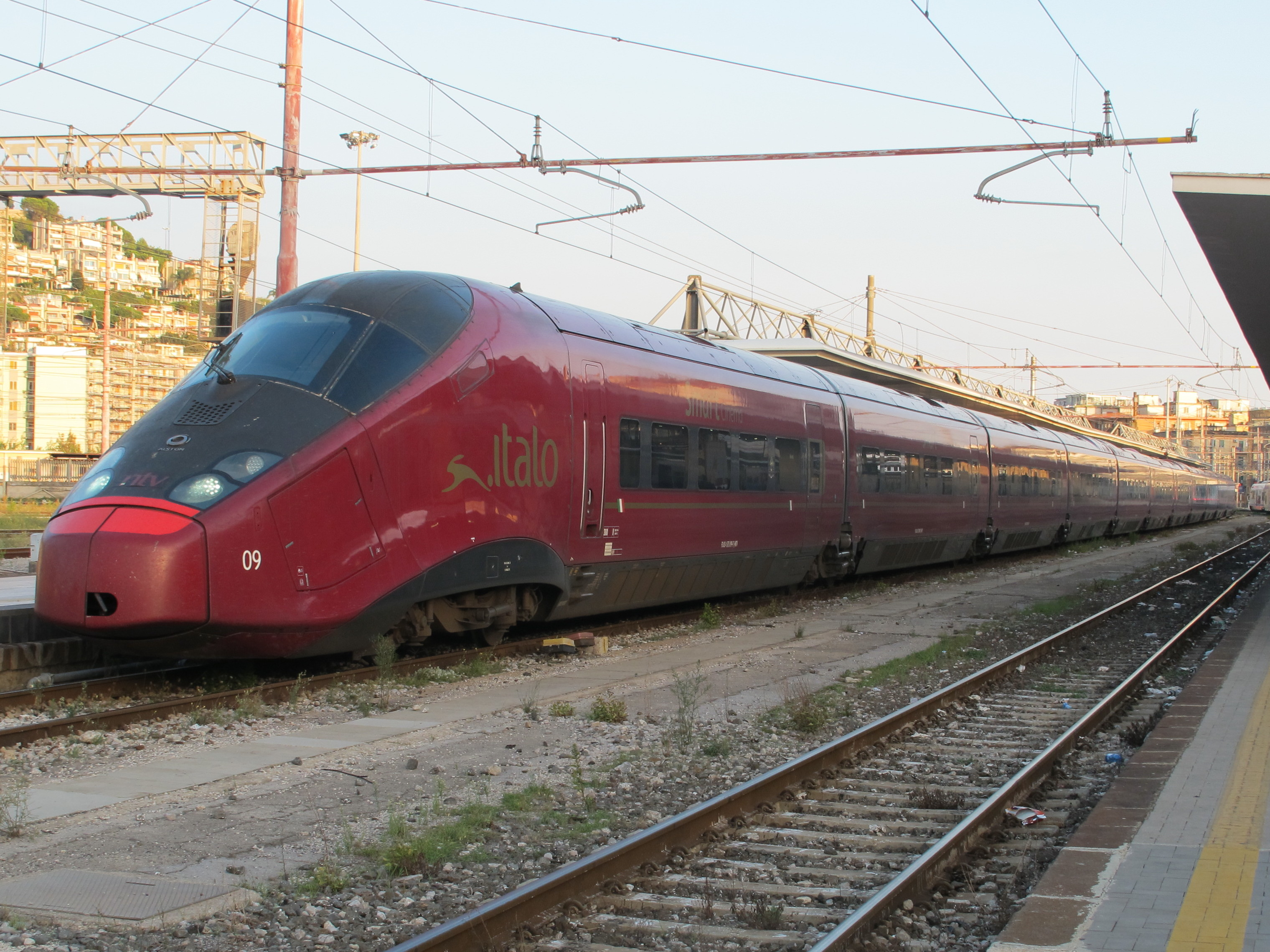
Alstom AGV

The region has a dense network of roads and motorways, a system of maritime connections and an international airport (Naples Airport). The port of Naples connects the region with the Mediterranean basin, and brings tourists to the archaeological sites, the cities of art (Naples and Caserta), to the coastal areas and to the islands.

==== Rail ====
There are high-speed rail lines:

- Rome–Naples
- Naples–Salerno

There is a maintenance and service centre for high-speed trains Alstom AGV in Nola.

Naples also has an urban metro system (Naples Metro), integrated with a metropolitan railway service that includes the Circumvesuviana, Cumana, Circumflegrea and suburban lines, providing connections between the city, the metropolitan area, and surrounding provinces.

Salerno is likewise served by a metropolitan railway service.

==== Maritime ====
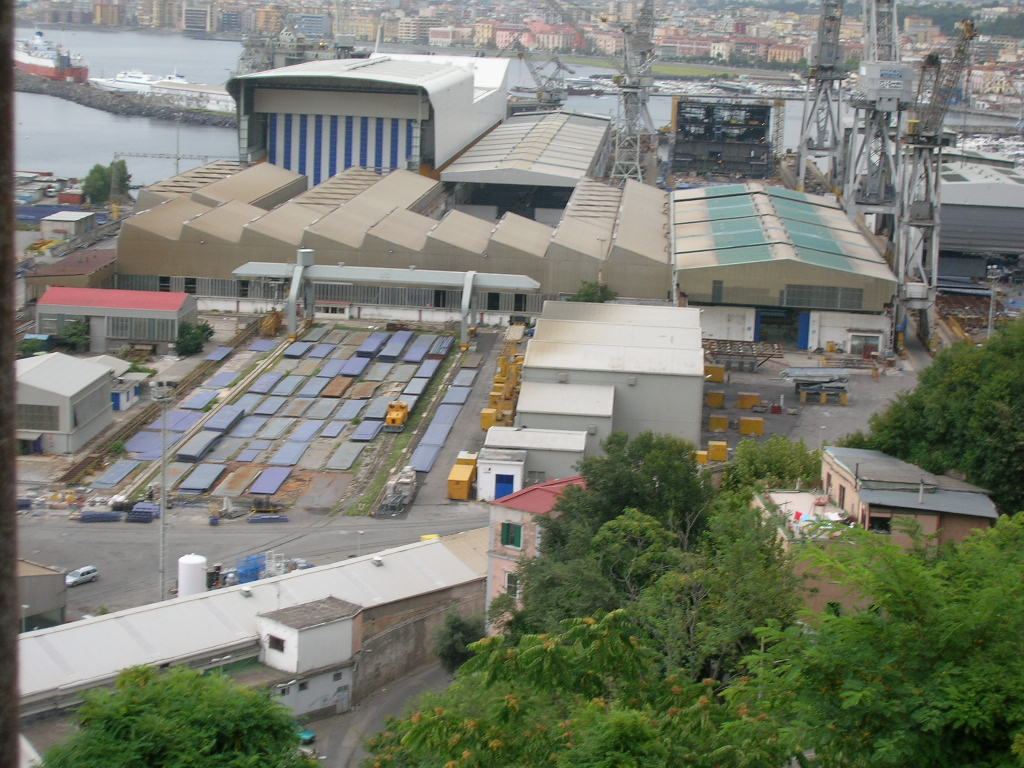
Fincantieri shipyard Castellammare di Stabia

Sea-based activity accounts for about 3.9% of the economy, which includes port movements of goods and passengers and sea transportation, as well as a sizable seaside tourism economy. In Castellammare di Stabia there is a big Fincantieri shipyard. Shipping companies Grimaldi and Tirrenia both headquarter in Naples.

=== Service ===
The services sector makes up for 78% of the region's gross domestic product.

=== Unemployment ===
The unemployment rate stood at 17.4% in 2022 and was one of the highest in Italy.

Year	2006	2007	2008	2009	2010	2011	2012	2013	2014	2015	2016	2017	2018	2019	2020	2021	2022
unemployment rate (in %)	12.8%	11.2%	12.5%	12.9%	13.9%	15.4%	19.2%	21.5%	21.7%	19.8%	20.4%	20.9%	20.4%	20.0%	17.9%	19.3%	17.4%

== Culture ==
=== Cuisine ===
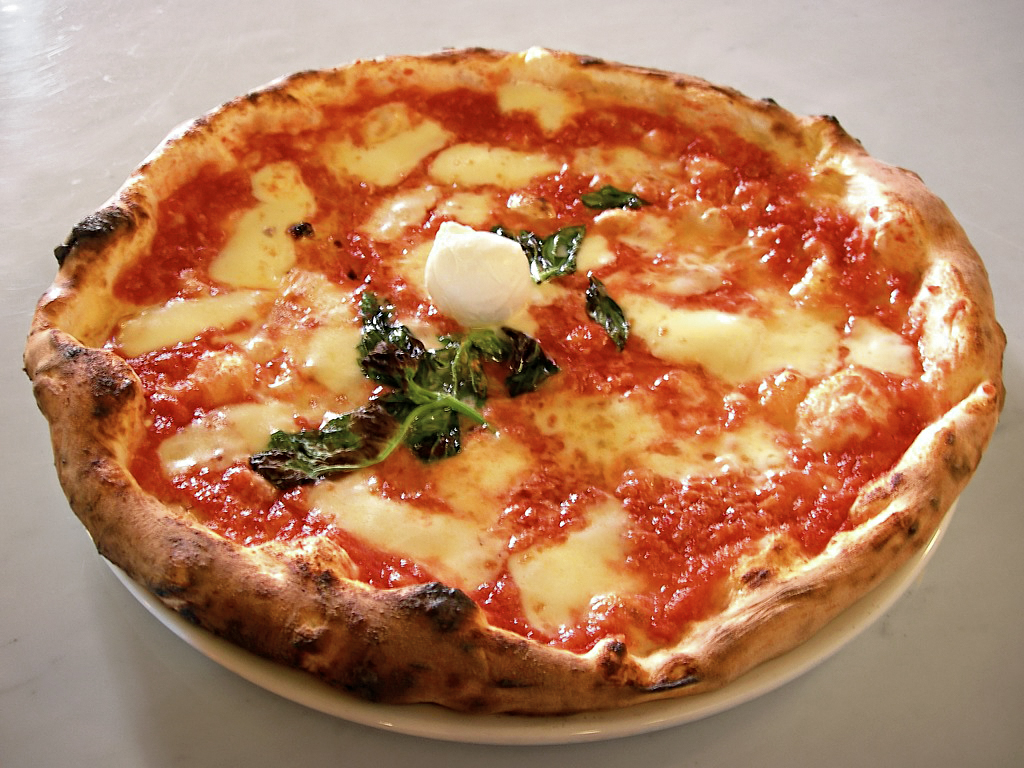
An authentic Neapolitan pizza

Campanian cuisine varies within the region. While Neapolitan dishes centre on seafood, Casertan and Aversan ones rely more on fresh vegetables and cheeses. The cuisine from Sorrento combines the culinary traditions from both Naples and Salerno. Pizza was conceived in Naples. Spaghetti is also a well-known dish from southern Italy and Campania.

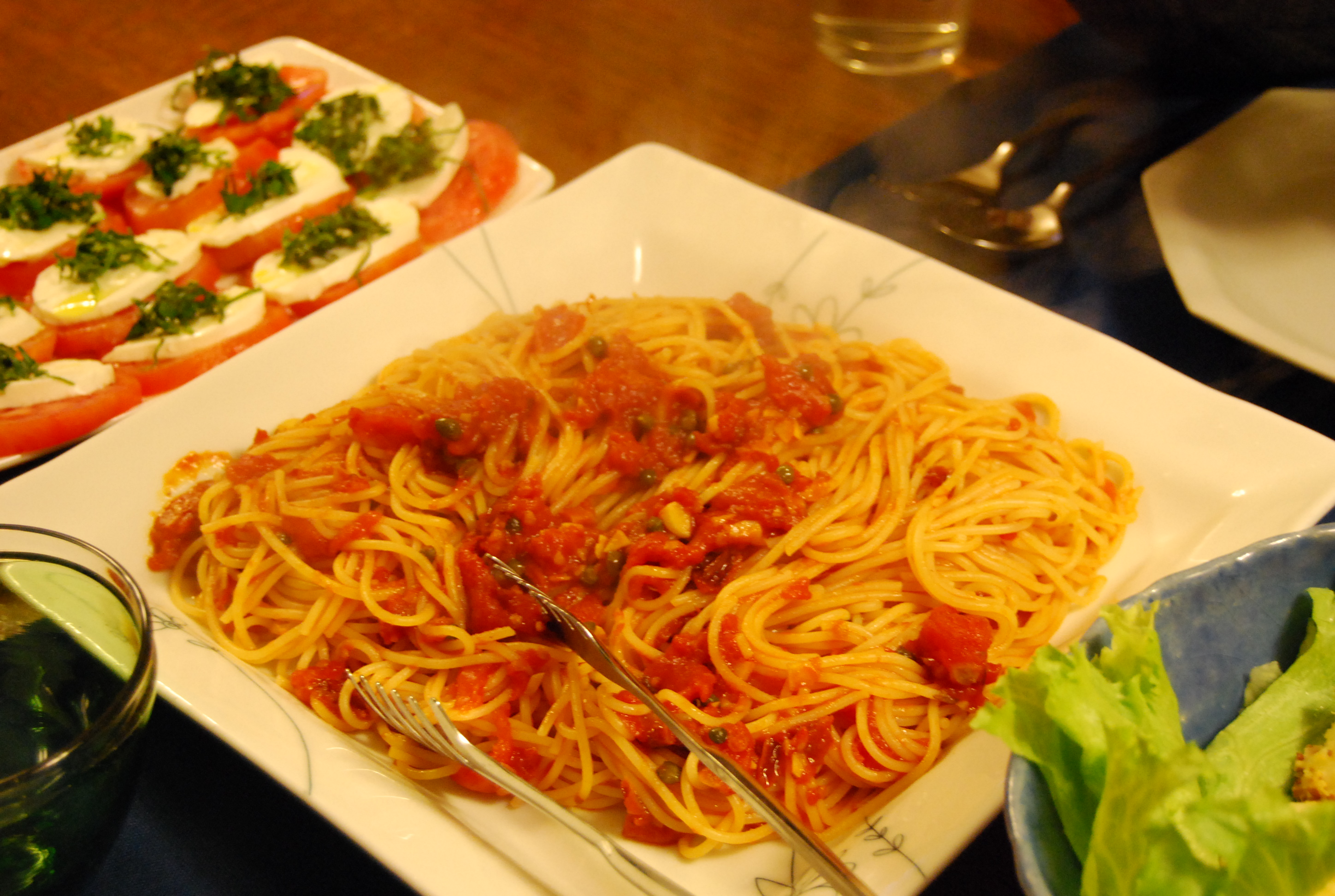
Spaghetti alla puttanesca, a spicy pasta dish topped with a sauce made of tomatoes, olives, anchovies and capers

Campania produces wines including Lacryma Christi, Fiano, Aglianico, Greco di Tufo, Falerno del Massico, Taburno, Solopaca, and Taurasi. The cheeses of Campania consist of Mozzarella di Bufala (buffalo mozzarella) (mozzarella made from buffalo milk), fiordilatte ("flower of milk") a mozzarella made from cow's milk, ricotta from sheep or buffalo milk, provolone from cow milk, and caciotta made from goat milk. Buffalo are bred in the provinces of Salerno and Caserta.

Several different cakes and pies are made in Campania. Pastiera pie is made during Easter. Casatiello and tortano are Easter breads made by adding lard or oil and various types of cheese to bread dough and garnishing it with slices of salami. Babà cake is a well known Neapolitan delicacy, best served with rum or limoncello (a liqueur invented in the Sorrento peninsula). It is an old Austrian cake, which arrived in Campania during the Austrian domination of the Kingdom of Two Sicilies and was modified there to become a "walking cake" for citizens always in a hurry for work and other pursuits. Sfogliatella is another pastry from the Amalfi Coast, as is Zeppole, traditionally eaten on Saint Joseph's day. Struffoli, little balls fried dough dipped in honey, are enjoyed during the Christmas holidays.

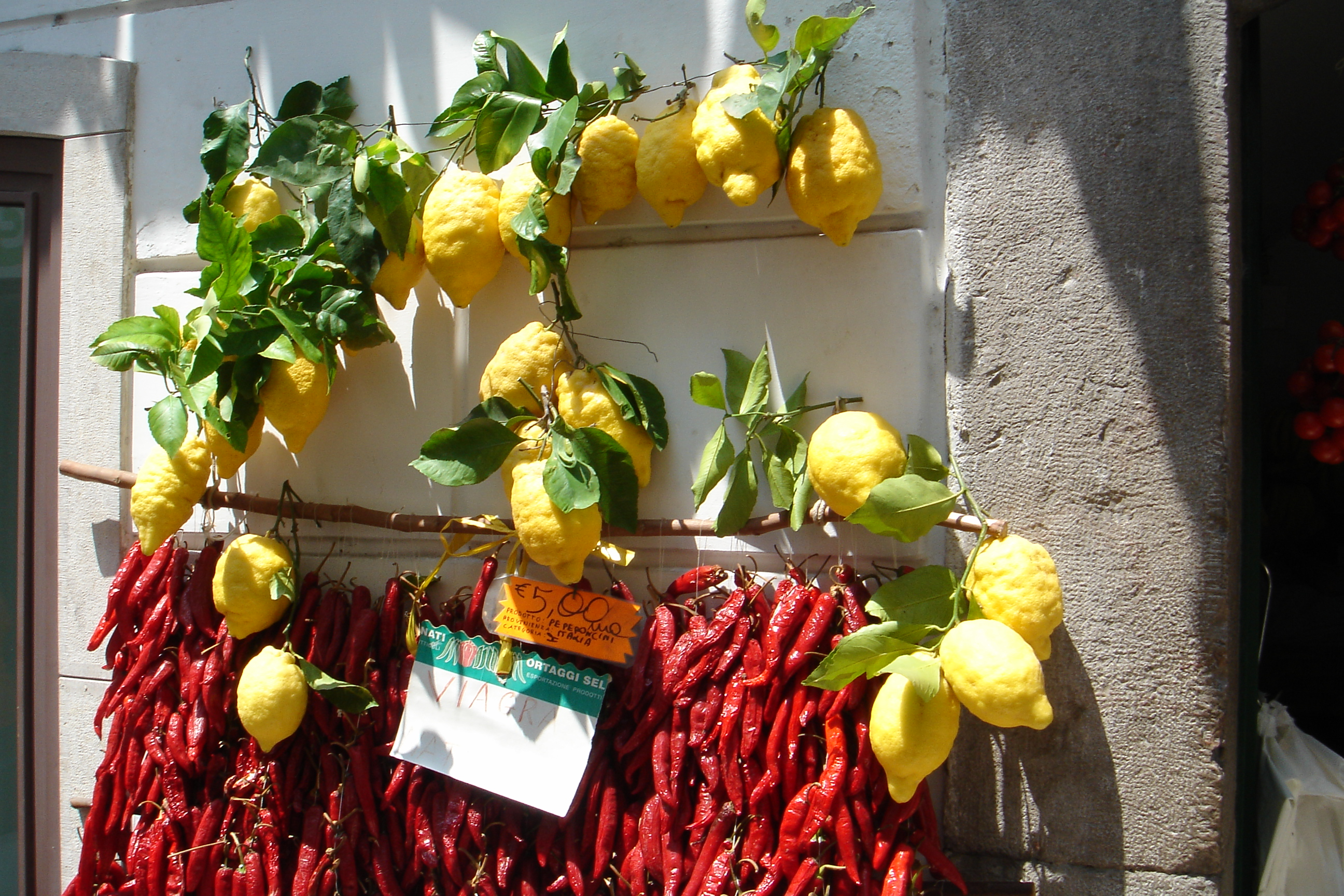
Dried red peppers and lemons hanging from a shop in Amalfi

Another Campanian dish is the Russian salad, also known as Olivier salad, which is based on similar dishes from France. It is made of potatoes in mayonnaise garnished with shrimp and vegetables in vinegar. Another French-derived dish is "gattò" or "gâteau di patate" (an oven-baked pie made of boiled potatoes). As with the Russian salad, Campania is home to popular seafood-based dishes, such as "insalata di mare" (seafood salad), "zuppa di polpo" (octopus soup), and "zuppa di cozze" (mussel soup). Other regional seafood dishes include "frittelle di mare" (fritters with seaweed), made with edible poseidonia algae, "triglie al cartoccio" (red mullet in the bag), and "alici marinate" (fresh anchovies in olive oil). The island of Ischia is known for its fish dishes, as well as for cooked rabbit. Campania is also home to the lemons of Sorrento. Rapini (or Broccoli rabe), known locally as friarielli, are often used in regional cooking. Campania also produces many nuts, especially in the area of Avellino, Salerno and Benevento. Hazelnut production is especially relevant in the province of Avellino – in Spanish, in Portuguese and in Occitan the hazelnut is respectively called avellana, avelã and avelano, after the city of Avella. That is also the case of ancient Italian avellana, which is however not in use anymore.

=== Ancient, medieval, and early arts ===
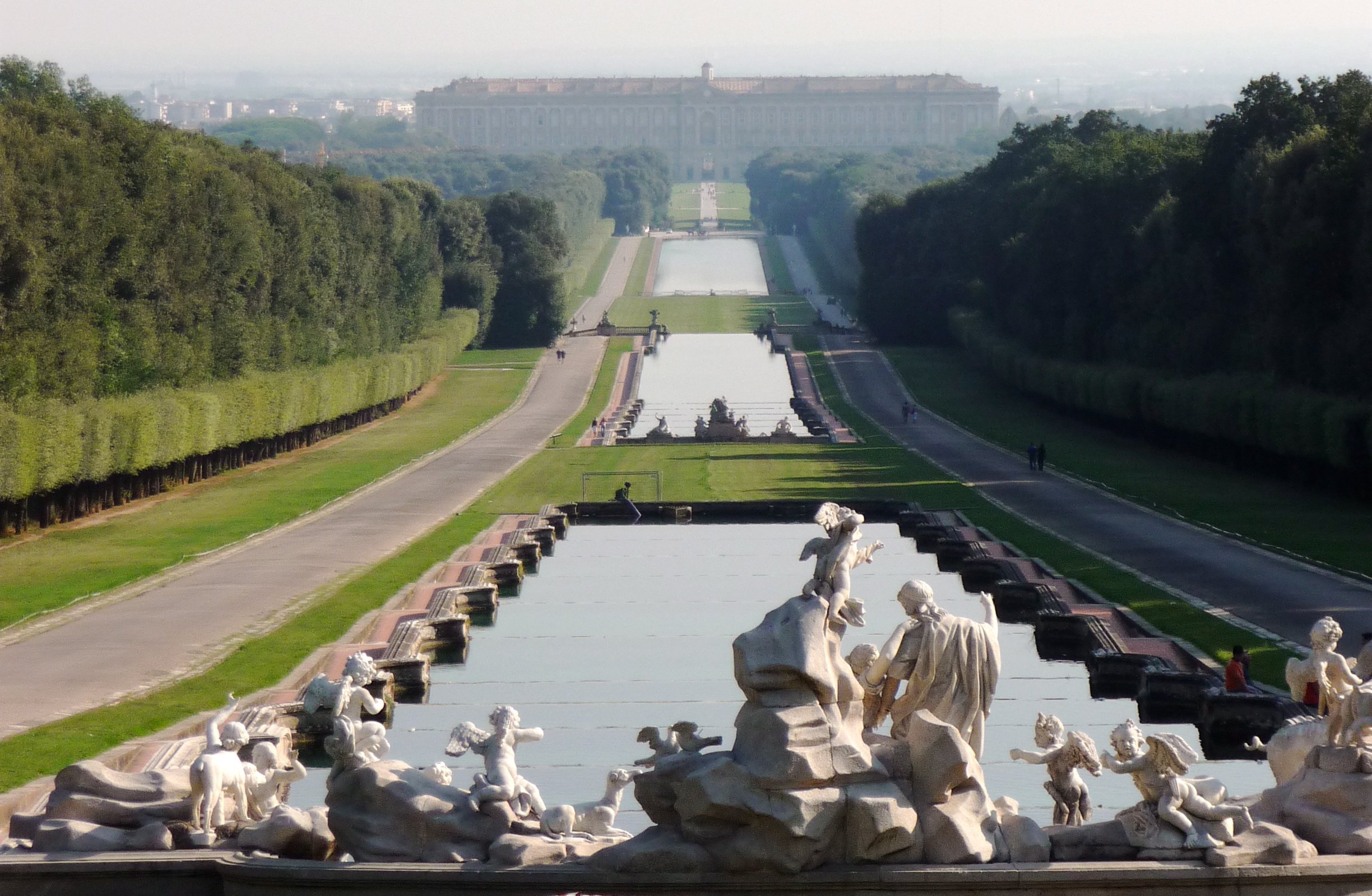
The grand gardens of the baroque Royal Palace of Caserta

Since the Greek colony of Elea, now Velia, Campania was home to philosophers of the Pre-Socratic philosophy school, such as Parmenides and Zeno of Elea, who came to prominence around 490–480 BC. The Latin poet Vergil (70–19 BC) settled in Naples in his late-life: parts of his epic poem Aeneid are located in Campania. The ancient scientist Pliny the Elder studied Mount Vesuvius and died after being poisoned and killed by gas emitted from the volcano during the 79 AD eruption.

Romulus Augustus, the last emperor of the Western Roman Empire, died as a prisoner of the German general Odoacer at Naples around 500. In the Middle Ages, the artist Giotto made some frescoes in Castel Nuovo. These works of art were subsequently destroyed by an earthquake.

By the end of the Middle Ages, the medical school of Salerno, which combined ancient Roman and Greek medicine with Arab medicine, was known throughout Europe and its methods were adopted across the continent. Some have suggested that this may have been one of the first universities in Europe. Boccaccio, the Tuscan poet, visited Naples on various occasions, and in the Decameron described it as a dissolute city. He also wrote a love story involving a noblewoman close to the King of Naples.

In 1570, the Spanish writer Miguel de Cervantes, who wrote the romance novel Don Quixote, served as a Spanish soldier for a period in Naples. Poet Torquato Tasso was born in Sorrento in 1544. Years earlier in 1558, the first modern description and studies of the "camera obscura" ("dark chamber"), were established in Italy by Giovanni Battista della Porta in his Magiae Naturalis.

Philosopher Giordano Bruno was born in Nola. He was the first to theorize infinite suns and infinite worlds in the universe. He was burnt in Rome by the Spanish Inquisition in 1600. Later, in c. 1606, the Baroque painter Caravaggio established his studio in Naples. Italian Baroque architect Cosimo Fanzago from Bergamo also decided to move to Naples.

In the 18th century, Naples was the last city to be visited by philosophers who created the "Grand Tour" which was the big touring voyage to visit all the important cultural sites of the European continent. Italian architect Luigi Vanvitelli son of Dutch architect Caspar van Wittel built the Royal Palace in Caserta in c. 1750. He contributed to the construction of many neoclassic-style palaces in which the nobles of Naples spent their holidays. These palaces are now known worldwide as "Ville Vesuviane".

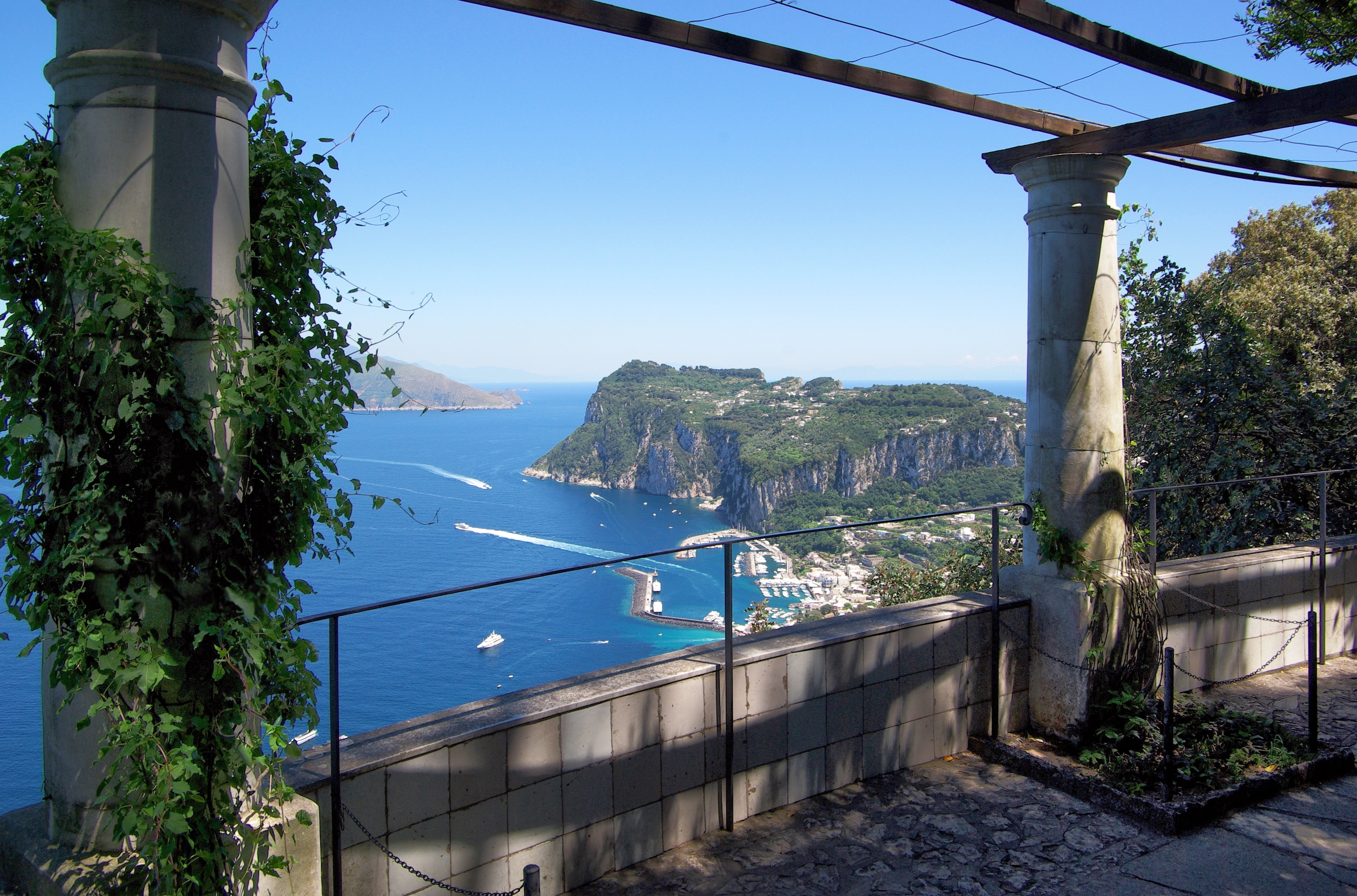
The island of Capri, often seen as a cultural symbol of Campania

Raimondo di Sangro, prince of Sansevero, was a scientist and one of the last alchemists. Around this time, in 1786, German writer Goethe visited Campania and Naples. German archaeologist Johann Joachim Winckelmann also visited Naples, Paestum, Herculaneum and Pompeii in 1748 and later, studying how archaeological surveys were conducted in the kingdom of Naples. He was one of the first to study drawings, statues, stones, and ancient burned scrolls made of papyrus found in the excavations of the city of Herculaneum. Archaeological excavations in Pompeii were initiated by King Charles III of Naples in 1748. He issued the first modern laws in Europe to protect, defend and preserve archaeological sites. Neapolitan musicians of that period include Niccolò Antonio Zingarelli and Giovanni Paisiello.

Musician Gioachino Rossini lived for several years in Naples, where he wrote numerous compositions. Italian poet and writer Giacomo Leopardi established his home in Naples and Torre del Greco, remaining there at the end of his brief young life. He died at Naples in 1837. The first volcano observatory, the Vesuvius Observatory, was founded in Naples in 1841. Geologist Giuseppe Mercalli, born in Milan in 1850, was a director of the Vesuvius Observatory.

In February 1851, British statesman William Ewart Gladstone was allowed to visit the prison where Giacomo Lacaita, legal adviser to the British embassy, was imprisoned by the Neapolitan government, along with other political dissidents. He deplored their condition, and in April and July, he published two Letters to the Earl of Aberdeen against the Neapolitan government, followed by An Examination of the Official Reply of the Neapolitan Government in 1852. His pamphlets may have contributed to the cause of the unification of Italy in 1861.

French writer Alexandre Dumas, père was directly involved in the process of the Unification of Italy and sojourned two or three years in Naples, where he wrote several historical novels regarding that city. He was also a known newspaper correspondent. Francesco de Sanctis, writer, politician and twice Minister of Instruction after the reunification of Italy in 1861, was born in Morra De Sanctis near Avellino.

German scientist Anton Dohrn founded in Naples the first public aquarium in the world and laboratory for the study of the sea, known as Maritime Zoological Station. The Astronomic Observatory of Capodimonte was founded by King Joachim Murat, in 1816. The observatory now hosts the Italian Laboratory of Astrophysics. Doctors and surgeons Antonio Cardarelli and Giuseppe Moscati were representatives of medical studies in Naples.

=== Contemporary and modern arts ===
The so-called "School of Posillipo" and "School of Resina", dating from the late 19th to early 20th centuries, included painters, such as Giacinto Gigante, Federico Cortese, Domenico Morelli, Saverio Altamura, Giuseppe De Nittis, Vincenzo Gemito, Antonio Mancini, and Raffaello Pagliaccetti.

Amongst the painters who inspired directly these schools, are Salvator Rosa, Pierre-Jacques Volaire, and Anton Sminck van Pitloo, who spent his last years in Naples. Opera singer Enrico Caruso was also a native of Naples. Russian revolutionary leader Vladimir Lenin lived for a period in Capri. In the 20th century, the music genre called Neapolitan song became popular worldwide, with songs such as "'O sole mio", "Funiculì, Funiculà", "'O surdato 'nnammurato", "Torna a Surriento", "Santa Lucia", "Malafemmena", "'A vucchella", and "Passione".

Mathematician Renato Caccioppoli, nephew of the Russian anarchic revolutionary Mikhail Bakunin, was born in Naples. The first President of the Italian Republic in 1946 (with a pro-tempore mandate of six months) was Enrico De Nicola from Torre del Greco. Campania is also home to the former Prime Minister and 6th President of the Republic Giovanni Leone, as well as the 11th President, Giorgio Napolitano.

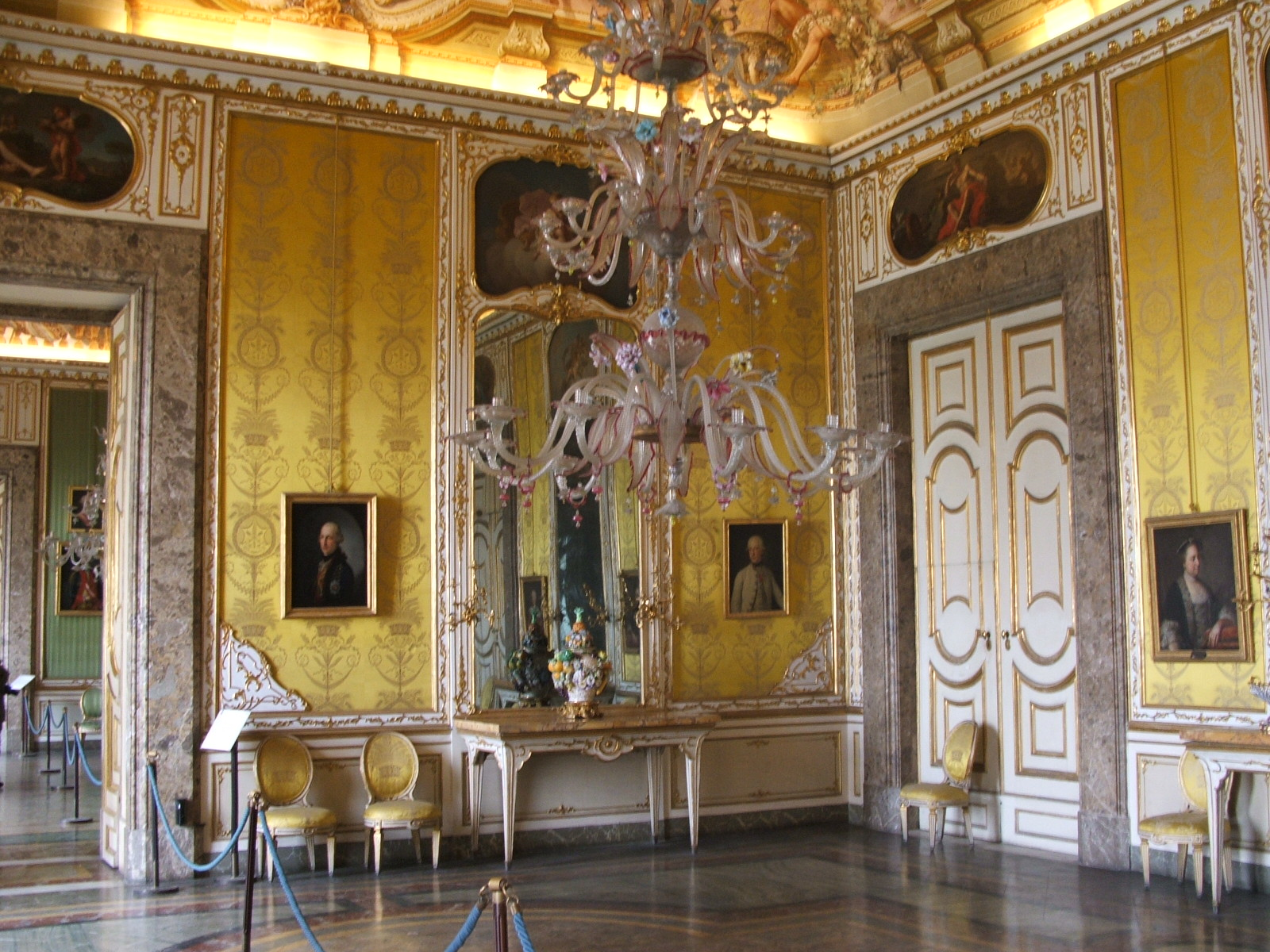
Late Baroque art inside the Palace of Caserta

The 20th century's best known philosopher and literate in Naples was Benedetto Croce, known for his studies in aesthetics, ethics, logic, economy, history, politics.

Neapolitan artists, actors, playwrights, and showmen included Eduardo De Filippo and Peppino De Filippo, and their sister Titina De Filippo. Totò (byname of Antonio de Curtis) was one of the most important comedians in Naples in the 20th century. He is also known for the song "Malafemmena".

Pop artist Andy Warhol created two famous paintings of the 1980 Irpinia earthquake: Fate presto and Vesuvius 365. Both originals are hosted in the exhibit Terrae Motus in the Palace of Caserta.

Oscar–winning actress Sophia Loren grew up in Pozzuoli.

Oscar and David-winning film producer Dino De Laurentiis was born in Torre Annunziata. One of his grandchildren is Food Network personality Giada De Laurentiis.

Contemporary Campanian writers include Curzio Malaparte and Roberto Saviano.

20th- and 21st-century Campanian actors and directors include Francesco Rosi, Iaia Forte, Pappi Corsicato, Teresa De Sio, Lello Arena, Massimo Troisi and director Gabriele Salvatores.

Modern Italian singers and musicians from Campania include Peppino di Capri, Renato Carosone, Edoardo Bennato, Eugenio Bennato, Mario Merola, Sergio Bruni, Aurelio Fierro, Roberto Murolo, Tony Tammaro, Teresa De Sio, Eduardo De Crescenzo, Alan Sorrenti, Tullio De Piscopo, Massimo Ranieri, Pino Daniele, James Senese and his group Napoli Centrale, Enzo Avitabile, Enzo Gragnaniello, Nino D'Angelo, Gigi D'Alessio, 99 Posse, and Almamegretta.

Artists who directed movies about Naples or actors who played in movies in Campania, or interpreted Neapolitans on-screen, include Vittorio De Sica, Domenico Modugno, Renzo Arbore, Lina Wertmüller, Mario Lanza as Caruso, Clark Gable in "It Started in Naples", and Jack Lemmon in the movies "Maccheroni" (which co-starred Marcello Mastroianni) and "Avanti!".

The international Giffoni Film Festival, established in 1971, is the first and most important festival for a young public.

=== Sports ===
The Stadio Diego Armando Maradona is the home ground of SSC Napoli of Serie A.

Campania is home to several national football, futsal, water polo, volleyball, basketball and tennis clubs.

The fencing school in Naples is the oldest in the country and the only school in Italy in which a swordsman can acquire the title "master of swords", which allows him or her to teach the art of fencing.

The Circolo Savoia and Circolo Canottieri Napoli sailing clubs are among the oldest in Italy and are known for their regattas. These are also home of the main water polo teams in the city. Many sailors from Naples and Campania participate as crew in the America's Cup sailing competition.

Rowers Giuseppe Abbagnale and Carmine Abbagnale were born in Castellammare di Stabia: they were four times rowing world champions and Olympic gold medalists.

Across the top 3 levels of Italian football, the clubs in Campania include:

- SSC Napoli playing in Serie A, and the only team in the south of Italy to have won the Serie A title
- US Salernitana 1919 playing in Serie C
- Benevento Calcio playing in Serie C
- US Avellino 1912 playing in Serie C
- SS Juve Stabia playing in Serie C
- SS Turris Calcio playing in Serie C

== See also ==
- HMS Campania – two ships of the British Royal Navy have been named HMS Campania after the region of Campania.

== Bibliography ==
- Magnusson, Magnus; Goring, Rosemary, eds. (1990). Cambridge Biographical Dictionary. Cambridge, UK: Cambridge University Press. ISBN 0-521-39518-6.
