= Basilica of Sant'Ubaldo, Gubbio =

Church in Umbria, Italy

Coordinates: 43.3564°N 12.5850°E

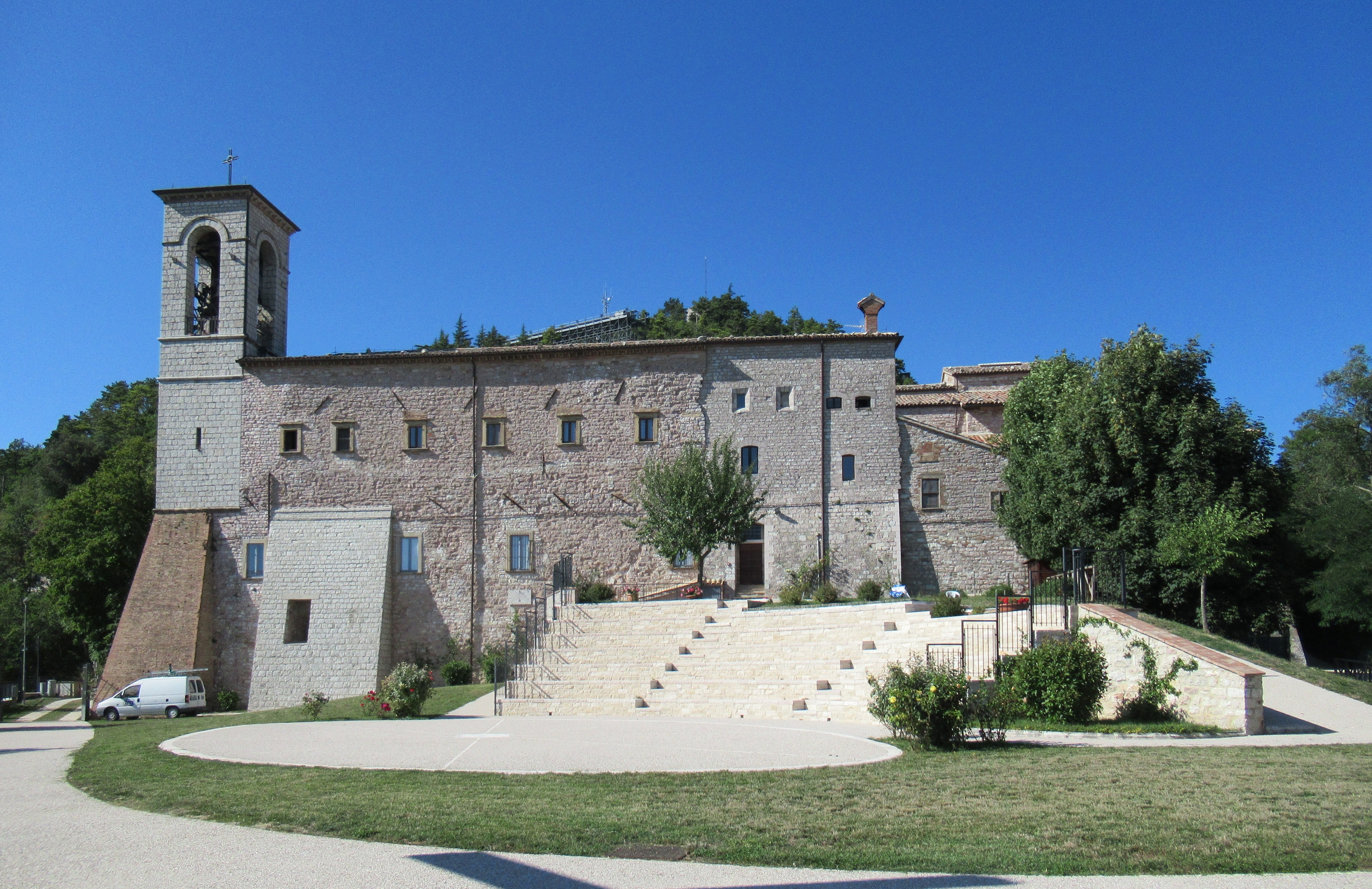
Sant'Ubaldo

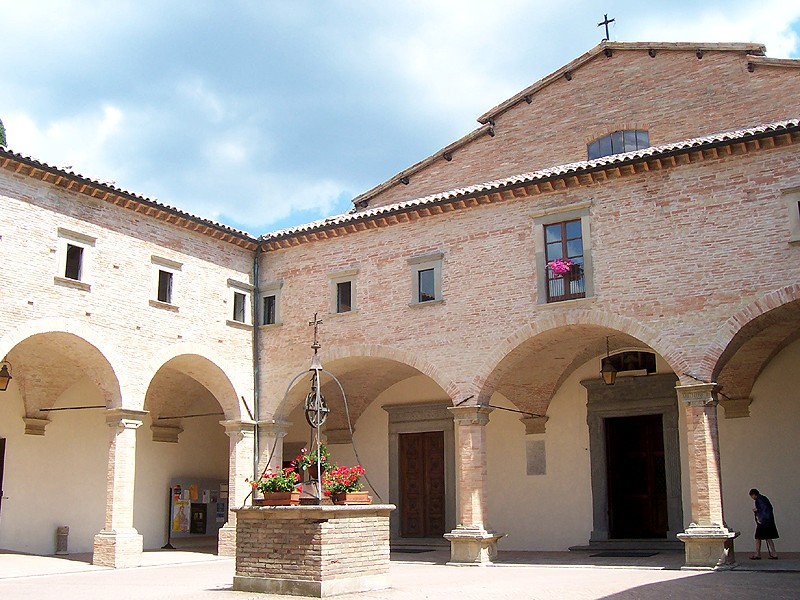
The courtyard of the Basilica

The Basilica of Sant'Ubaldo is a Roman Catholic church atop Mount Ingino, outside central Gubbio in Umbria, Italy. The church houses the body of the patron saint of Gubbio, Saint Ubaldo (the 12th-century Bishop Ubaldo Baldassini), kept atop the main altar on a marble plinth, surmounted by a glass case.

== History ==
The church and adjacent convent were originally built in the first decade of the 1500s by Canons Regular of the Lateran. Once rich in stucco decoration from the Baroque era, much of this decoration was destroyed during bombing during the Second World War, and the interior was reconstructed. The church is accessible through a long, winding trail from the city or a more adventurous chair-lift ride.

== Saint Ubaldo Day ==
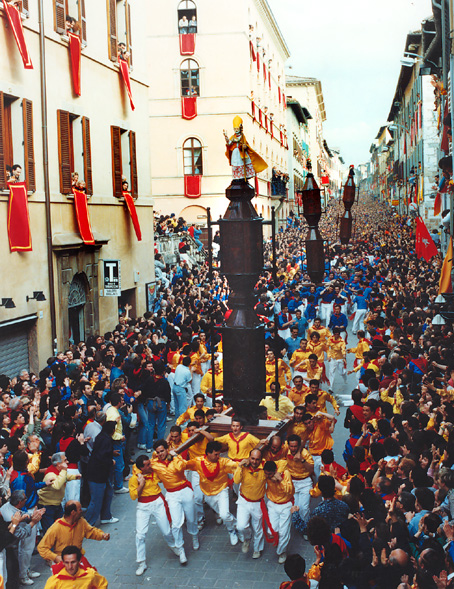
La Corsa dei Ceri

The church is the finishing point for the annual Saint Ubaldo Day procession on 15 May of each year (in Italian, La Corsa dei Ceri). The procession includes a race between three teams of men each representing one of the town's three guilds:

- The masons (in gold) with a statue of Saint Ubald
- The merchants (in blue) with a statue of Saint George
- The peasants (in black) with a statue of Saint Anthony

The participants dress in colourful ceraioli and carry three nearly-900-pound wooden stands and statues (Ceri) of their saints through the city to the city gates. Thereafter, the teams sprint up Mount Ingino to the basilica where the statues remain until the following May. A similar festival is celebrated in Jessup, Pennsylvania. The event is considered an important contribution to the town's tourism industry.

== Artworks ==
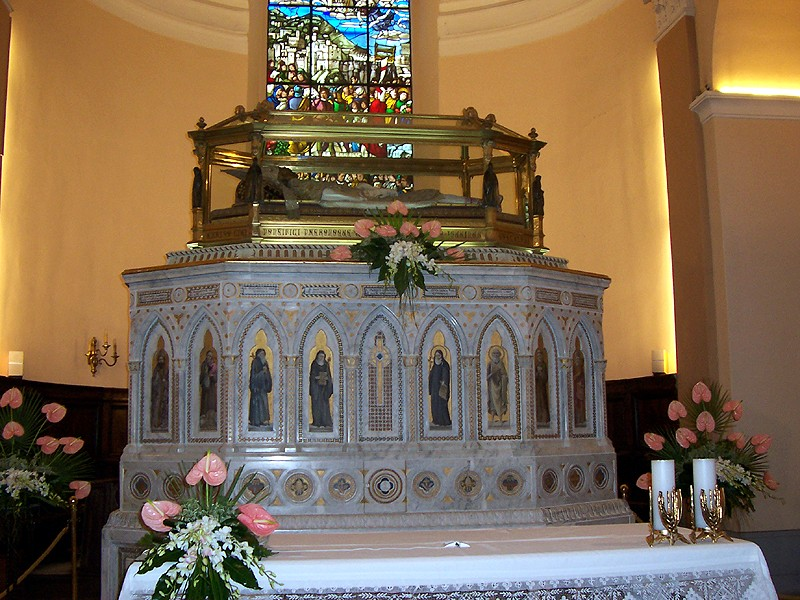
The glass sarcophagus of Saint Ubaldo.

Among the works inside the church are:

- Stained Glass windows by Mossmeyer
- Madonna and child by Salvio Salvini
- St Augustine consigns the rules of his order (1604) by Avanzino Nucci
- Visitation (1620) by Pietro Paolo Tamburini
- Transfiguration (1585) by Giovanni Maria Baldassini
- Baptism of Christ (1599) by Felice Damiani
- St Francis receives stigmata (1816) by Camilla Filicchi
- Martyrdom of St Ursula and the Virgins (1657) by Francesco Allegrini
- Vergine Addolorata (1789) by Tommaso Maria Conca

== See also ==
- Mount Ingino Christmas Tree
