= Flag of Umbria =

- Use: Civil and state flag
- Proportion: 2:3
- Adopted: 18 March 2004

The flag of Umbria is one of the official symbols of the region of Umbria, Italy. The current flag was officially adopted on 18 March 2004, although the emblem and gonfalon had been in use since the 1970s. The Regional Law of 18 May 2004 officially confirmed the flag and added the words Regione Umbria ("Umbria Region") in red, centered in the bottom fifth of the flag, but in common usage, the words are omitted.

== History and Symbolism ==
The flag of Umbria is inspired by a banner designed by architects Gino and Alberto Anselmi, winners of a 1971 competition, who described the symbolism:

Ci premeva [...] che stemma e gonfalone divenissero segnali di quel territorio [l'Umbria, ndr], e che quindi rispecchiassero lo spirito, le tensioni, l'atmosfera, i colori di quei luoghi che ancora vivono di profonde valenze medievali.

We proposed [...] that the emblem and gonfalon would become signs of that territory [Umbria, ed], and thus would reflect the spirit, the tensions, the atmosphere, the colors of those places that still live on in deep medieval values.

The symbol in the flag's center represents the three candles of the Festa dei Ceri, which occurs annually on 15 May in Gubbio, Perugia, in honour of Saint Ubaldo Baldassini.

The coat of arms and flag of the region are officially defined as such:

Lo Stemma della Regione è costituito da elementi geometrici raffiguranti in sintesi grafica i tre ceri di Gubbio, di colore rosso, delimitati da strisce bianche, in campo argento di forma rettangolare, come rappresentato nel bozzetto allegato, che forma parte integrante della presente legge…La Bandiera della Regione è formata da un drappo di forma rettangolare, del colore del Gonfalone, con al centro lo Stemma di cui all' articolo 2, di dimensioni pari a tre quinti dell'altezza della Bandiera stessa, con la scritta "Regione Umbria" in rosso nel quinto inferiore.
(L.R. 18 May 2004, N.5, Art.2–4)

The Coat of Arms of the Region consists of geometric elements depicting in graphic synthesis the three candles of Gubbio, red, bordered by white stripes, on a silver field rectangular in shape, as shown in the sketch attached, which forms an integral part of this Law ... the Flag of the Region consists of a cloth of rectangular shape, the same color as the gonfalon, with the coat of arms as referred to in Article 2 in the center, of dimensions equal to three-fifths of the height of the Flag itself, with the inscription "Umbria Region" in red in the bottom fifth.
(Regional Law of 18 May 2004, Number 5, Articles 2–4)

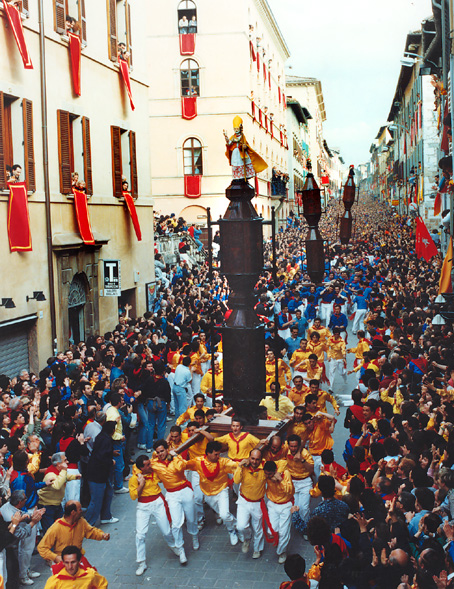
The Festa dei Ceri in Gubbio, on 15 May

== Gallery ==
Proposed flag of Umbria by Lega Nord

Flag of Cospaia Republic
