= San Giovanni Battista, Gubbio =

Roman Catholic church in Piazza San Giovanni in Italy

Coordinates: 43.352533°N 12.57814°E

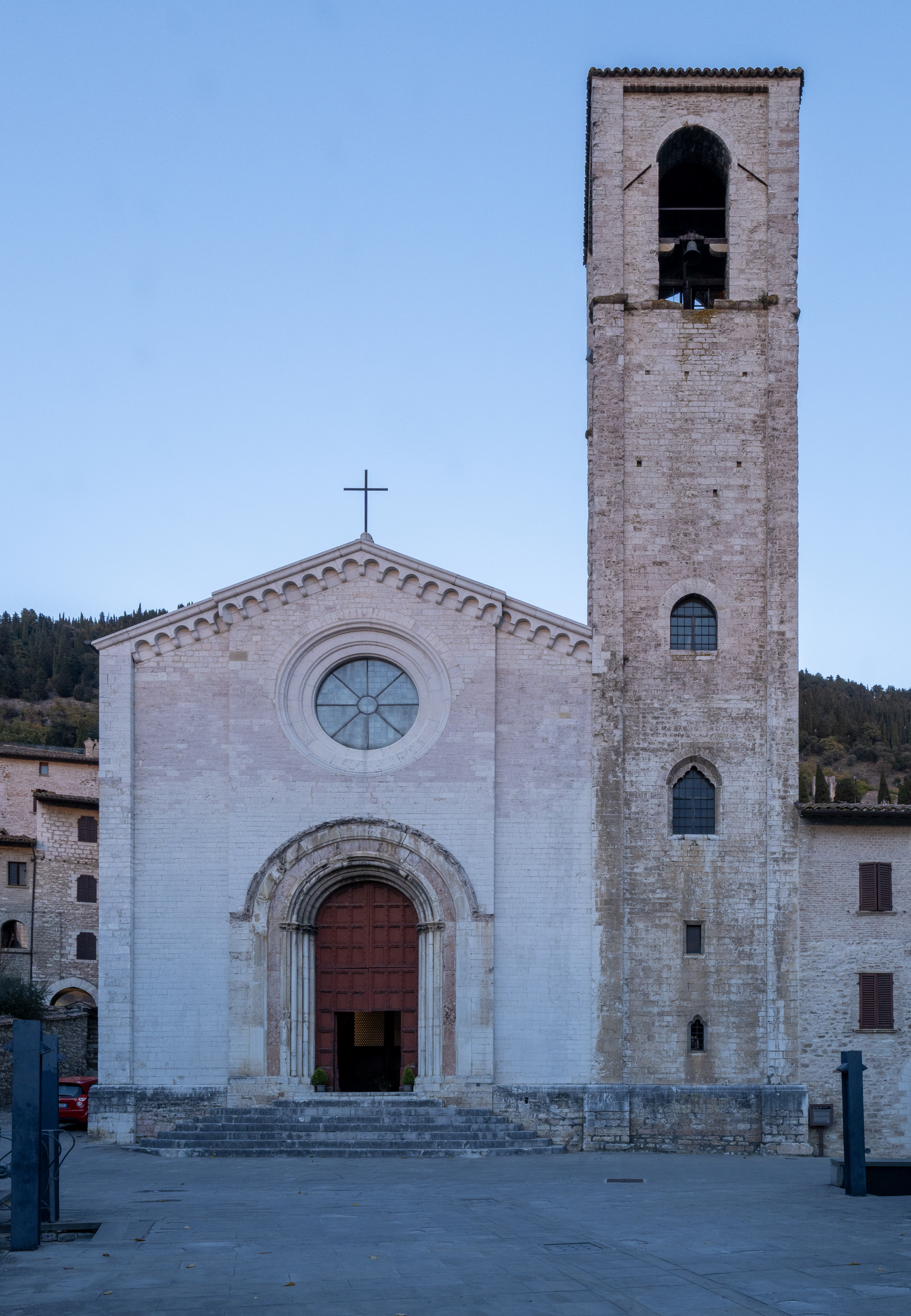
Facade and Campanile, with Palazzo dei Consoli in background.

San Giovanni Battista is a Gothic and Romanesque style, Roman Catholic church in Piazza San Giovanni in the historic centre of Gubbio, Umbria, in Italy.

== History ==
The church was built over the 13th and 14th centuries at the site of a former paleo-Christian (4th–5th century) Duomo of San Mariano. It appears that the arrival of further relics and other events led to the construction of the present cathedral north of this location higher on the hill. Associated with John the Baptist, this church putatively once held a relic of this saint, and still houses a large 16th-century font used for baptisms. Documents from c. 1040 stated that Bishop Theobald I of Gubbio established a community of canons around this church, and documents from the 12th century note a parish of this name associated with the canons of San Mariano.

Since 2000, the church has been used as the putative locale or background of the long-running television series titled Don Matteo, which features the collaborations of a detective-priest and a bumbling carabinieri to solve moral and criminal problems afoot. It has caused some unwanted tourist attraction to the church.

== Interior decoration ==
The architecture of the church has endured many refurbishments over the centuries. Artwork has been lost, moved around, or imported. Stripped of much of its decoration, the present facade has a simple rounded portal, accessed by widening stairs, and flanked asymmetrically by small narrow pilasters, and with a narrow frieze along the roofline. The present round window was added in the 19th century. The campanile was restored in the recent past in a Romanesque fashion, removing the later mullioned windows it had placed before the 14th century.

The interior has a single nave. It has traces of anonymous 16th-century frescoes dedicated to St Catherine of Alexandria.

The first altarpiece on the left depicts the Baptism of Christ (16th century) attributed to Felice Damiani; this canvas was originally present in the town Duomo. Flanking this altar are two panels depicting Saints Lucy and Barbara (1578) by Benedetto Nucci. The second altarpiece on the left depicts an Annunciation (19th century) attributed to Camilla Filicchi, originally painted for another site, and installed here.

The first altarpiece on the right depicts San Carlo Borromeo at prayer, previously attributed to Claudio Ridolfi but now attributed to Andrea Commodi. The second altarpiece depicts the Calling of St Peter (1574) painted by Giovanni Maria Baldassini. This canvas was moved here from the deconsecrated church of San Paolo alla Piaggiola.

In the hexagonal chapel of the baptistry (assigned this purpose in 1829), damaged frescoes depict standing Saints Anthony of Padua and Bernardino of Siena and were attributed to Giacomo di Benedetto Bedi. The font originally stood outside of the church. Sculptural reliefs around the base depict events in the life of St John the Baptist. The odd collage of frescoed images on this chapel roof was painted in 1828–1829 by Annibale Beni when this hexagonal chapel was converted into a baptistry. The depictions collect images of the allegories of the Evangelists and the Cardinal virtues, and two scenes from the life of John the Baptist.

The altarpiece of the Madonna della Misericordia (18th century) is attributed to Giovanni Loreti of Fabriano. It replaces a painting of St Mary Magdalene by Felice Damiani that has been lost. Other panels in the baptistry were painted in 1830 by C Filicchi, depicting St Elizabeth and the young St John the Baptist, God the father, and St Ubaldus with the 14th-century reliquary of the finger of St John the Baptist. This original reliquary was still present in the Duomo in 1885 but has also disappeared. A new reliquary was commissioned in 1913. These panels were stolen in 1971 but soon recovered.
