= Mount Ingino Christmas Tree =

Annual lighting illumination in Gubbio, Umbria, Italy

Coordinates: 43.356°N 12.579°E

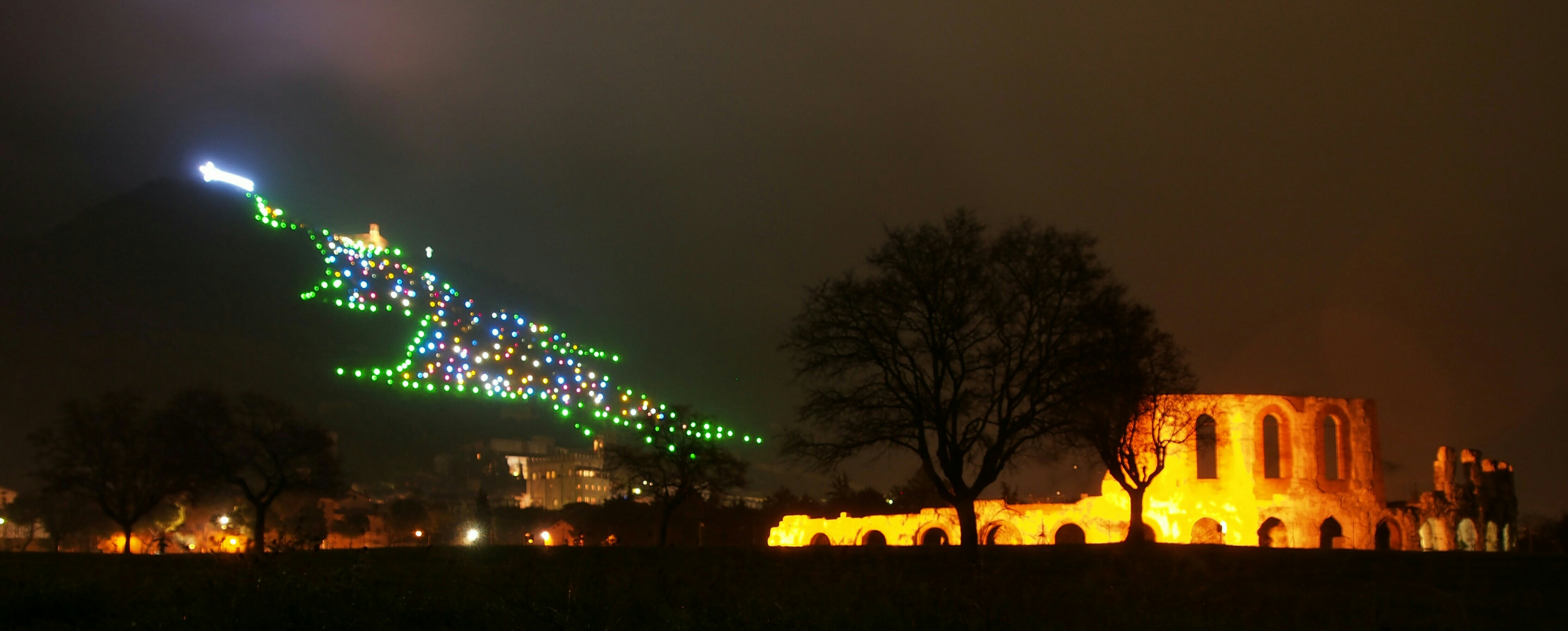
Mount Ingino Christmas Tree in Gubbio

The Mount Ingino Christmas Tree is a lighting illumination in the shape of a Christmas tree that is installed annually on the slopes of Mount Ingino (Monte Ingino in Italian) outside the city of Gubbio, in the Umbria region in Italy. The tree is also called the Gubbio Christmas Tree or the biggest Christmas tree in the world. In 1991 the Guinness Book of Records named it "The World's Largest Christmas Tree".

== History ==
The tree is 650 metres (2,130 ft) high and 350 m wide at its base and consists of 3000 multi-coloured lights and 8.5 kilometres of electrical cable, placed all the way up the slopes of Monte Ingino, which towers above the city. The illumination can be seen up to 50 kilometres (30 miles) away.

This tradition started when the people of Gubbio decided to celebrate Christmas in a different way and in 1981 the first tree was illuminated. Each year, on the eve of the feast of the Immaculate Conception (December 7), the Christmas tree is lit up. Since then the tradition is repeated annually thanks to a special committee consisting of volunteers giving up their free time for about three months every year.

Since 2010 electricity for the Christmas tree lights has been generated by the photovoltaic system.

In 2011 the lights were switched on remotely by Pope Benedict XVI using a tablet computer. The Pope spoke via video link to the people of Gubbio from his papal apartment in Vatican.

In 2013, the holiday display used 1,000 lights and stretched more than 1,000 square meters or 10,760 square feet.

In 2013, Don Francesco Soddu, Director of Italian CARITAS led the lighting ceremony. This was a tribute to the contribution of volunteers in times of emergency in Italian communities.

In 2014 the lights were switched on remotely by Pope Francis using a tablet computer.

In 2017 the lights were switched on remotely by Italian astronaut Paolo Nespoli while he was in the International Space Station.

== See also ==
- Basilica of Sant'Ubaldo, Gubbio
