= Camilla Filicchi =

Italian painter

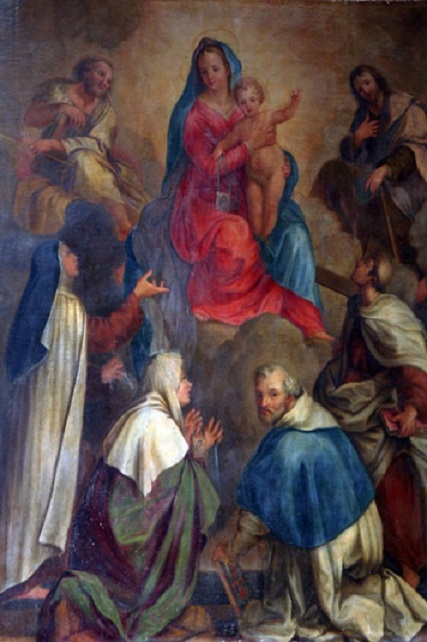
Madonna and Child, Prophets Elia and Eliseo, Santa Teresa of Avila, John of the Cross, and two Carmelites painted for Santa Croce della Foce, Gubbio

Camilla Filicchi (1771-1848) was an Italian woman painter, active in her native Gubbio.

== Biography ==
She had initial training in Gubbio with Giuseppe Reposati, but later with Annibale Beni. She painted a number of oil canvases for churches in the city, including an Ecstasy of St Francis for the Basilica di Sant'Ubaldo; and Annunciation for the church of San Giovanni Battista.

The late 19th-century biographer, historian of Gubio, Oderigi Lucarelli, dismisses her work with perhaps excessive misogyny, stating:

having applied herself to art only as a digression; her paintings, very warm in colour, are defective in perspective and in drawing. Elsewhere we will mention her best works, none of which, however, even rises to be mediocre.

It is not clear if she is related to Amabilia Filicchi, who lived in Livorno, and painted Elizabeth Ann Seton.
