= Ubald =

Italian bishop-saint

Saint Ubaldo of Gubbio
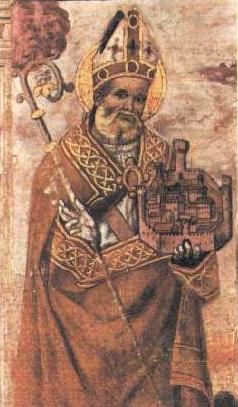

Bishop of Gubbio
- Born: ca. 1084; Gubbio, Italy
- Died: May 16, 1160 (aged 76); Gubbio, Italy
- Venerated in: Catholic Church
- Canonized: 4 March 1192 by Pope Celestine III
- Major shrine: Duomo, Gubbio, Italy
- Feast: May 16
- Attributes: Bishop giving a blessing as angels carry his crozier; bishop delivering a blessing while a devil flees from it; holding a scale model of Gubbio
- Patronage: Gubbio, Italy

Ubald of Gubbio (Italian: Ubaldo; Latin: Ubaldus; French: Ubalde; ca. 1084–1160) was a medieval bishop of Gubbio, in Umbria, today venerated as a saint by the Catholic Church. Saint Ubaldo Day is still celebrated at the Basilica of Sant'Ubaldo in Gubbio in his honor, as well as at Jessup, Pennsylvania.

== Life ==
Born Ubaldo Baldassini, the only son of noble parents Rovaldo and Guiliana Baldassini. He was a relative of Sperandia, abbess of a Camaldolese monastery at Cingoli.

Ubald was baptized in the church of San Giovanni and named after his uncle. Ubald's parents died while he was still very young, and he was raised by his uncle, the bishop of Gubbio. He was educated by the prior of the cathedral church of his native city, where he also became a canon regular.

Ubald entered the Monastery of St. Secondo in the same city, where he remained for some years. He was ordained about 1114. Recalled by his bishop, he returned to the cathedral monastery. The bishop made him prior of his cathedral that he might reform several abuses in the behaviour of the canons. He learned that Peter de Honestis some years before had established a community of canons regular at the monastery of Santa Maria in Portofuori at Ravenna. He also heard that Peter had given special statutes to the canons, which had been approved by Pope Paschal II. Ubald went there, where he remained for three months, to learn the details and the practice of their rules, wishing to introduce them among his own canons of Gubbio. He did so upon his return.

After some years, the chapter house and cloister burned down. Ubaldus looked upon this as a favourable opportunity of leaving his post, and become a hermit. With this in mind he made his way to that of Font-Avellano, where he found Peter of Rimini to whom he communicated his design of quitting the world. Peter opposed the notion as a dangerous temptation and exhorted him to return to his former vocation, in which God had fixed him for the good of others. Ubald therefore returned to Gubbio, rebuilt the cloisters, and rendered his chapter more flourishing than it had ever been.

Ubald had donated his patrimony to the poor and to the restoration of monasteries. Several bishoprics were offered to him, but he refused them all. However, in 1128, the episcopal See of Gubbio becoming vacant, he was sent, with some clerics, by the population to ask for a new bishop from Pope Honorius II who consecrated Ubald and sent him back to Gubbio. To his people he became a perfect pattern of all Christian virtues, and a powerful protector in all their spiritual and temporal needs.

Ubald was known for his patience and heroic gentleness and was considered to have the gift of healing. Once, it happened that in repairing the wall of the city, the workmen encroached upon his vineyard. The bishop mildly put them in mind of it and desired them to forbear. The overseer of the work moved with fury, scornfully pushed him into a great heap of mortar. The good bishop got up all covered with lime and dirt, without making the least expostulation. The people demanded that the overseer, in punishment for the offence, should be banished, and his goods confiscated. The saint endeavoured to make it pass for an accident; but when that could not satisfy the people, who knew how it happened, he being desirous to deliver the man out of the hands of the magistrates, maintained that the cognizance of the misdemeanour belonging to his own court, he would take care to do himself justice. Ubald then pardoned him.

In 1151, Perugia and a number of other towns allied against Gubbio. Ubaldo became commander of the Gubbio forces, which saw an overwhelming victory, which the populace attributed to the miraculous intervention of its bishop. In 1155, after the sack of nearby Spoleto, he later met with Emperor Frederick Barbarossa, who subsequently spared the city from attack. The people came to regard their bishop as the city's protector.

He died in 1160 after a long and painful illness of two years.

== Veneration ==
Ubaldo is the patron saint of Gubbio. Numerous miracles were attributed to him during his life and after his death. A number of miraculous cures were attributed to his intercession. The life of Ubaldo was written by Theobald, his immediate successor in the episcopal see, commissioned by Barbarossa.

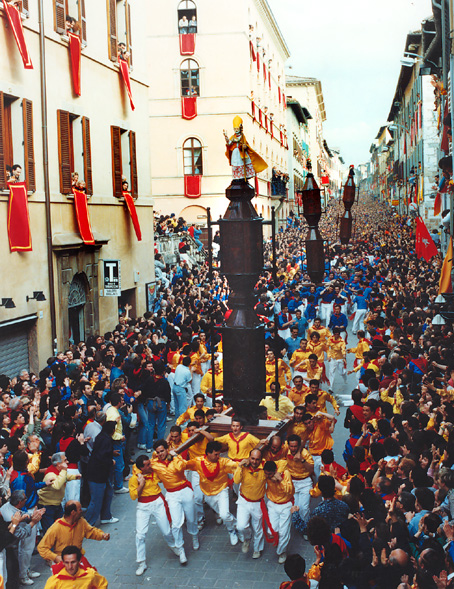
The festival of La Corsa dei Ceri at Gubbio. The statue of Saint Ubaldo leads the procession, followed by ceri topped with the statues of Saint George and Saint Anthony the Great.

At the solicitation of Bishop Bentivoglio Pope Celestine III canonized Ubald in 1192. The body of Ubaldo, had at first been buried in the cathedral church by the Bishops of Perugia and Cagli. In 1194 it was moved to the small oratory on the top of Mount Ingino overlooking the city, where in 1508, at the wish of the Duke of Urbino, the Canons Regular of the Lateran had built a church. Now known as the Basilica of Sant'Ubaldo, it is frequented by numerous pilgrims. Dante mentions Ubald in the Divine Comedy (Heaven Canto XI): “Between Tupino and the stream that falls down from the blest Ubaldo's chosen hill the slope is green a lofty mount below". Outside of Italy, a finger relic of Ubald is venerated in the Saint-Theobald collegiate church of Thann, Haut-Rhin (France).

The devotion to the saint is very popular throughout Umbria, but especially at Gubbio. The feast of their patron saint, called the Festival of Ceri, is celebrated by the inhabitants of the country round with great solemnity, there being religious and civil processions which call to mind the famous festivities of the Middle Ages in Italy. A celebration like the Corsa dei Ceri is held also in Jessup, Pennsylvania, where people carry out the same festivities as the residents of Gubbio do by "racing" the three statues through the streets during the Memorial Day weekend. The event in Gubbio may be a survival of a similar rite described in the pre-Christian Iguvine Tablets

== See also ==
- Saint Ubaldo Day
- Saint-Ubalde
