= Giovanni Maria Baldassini =

Italian painter

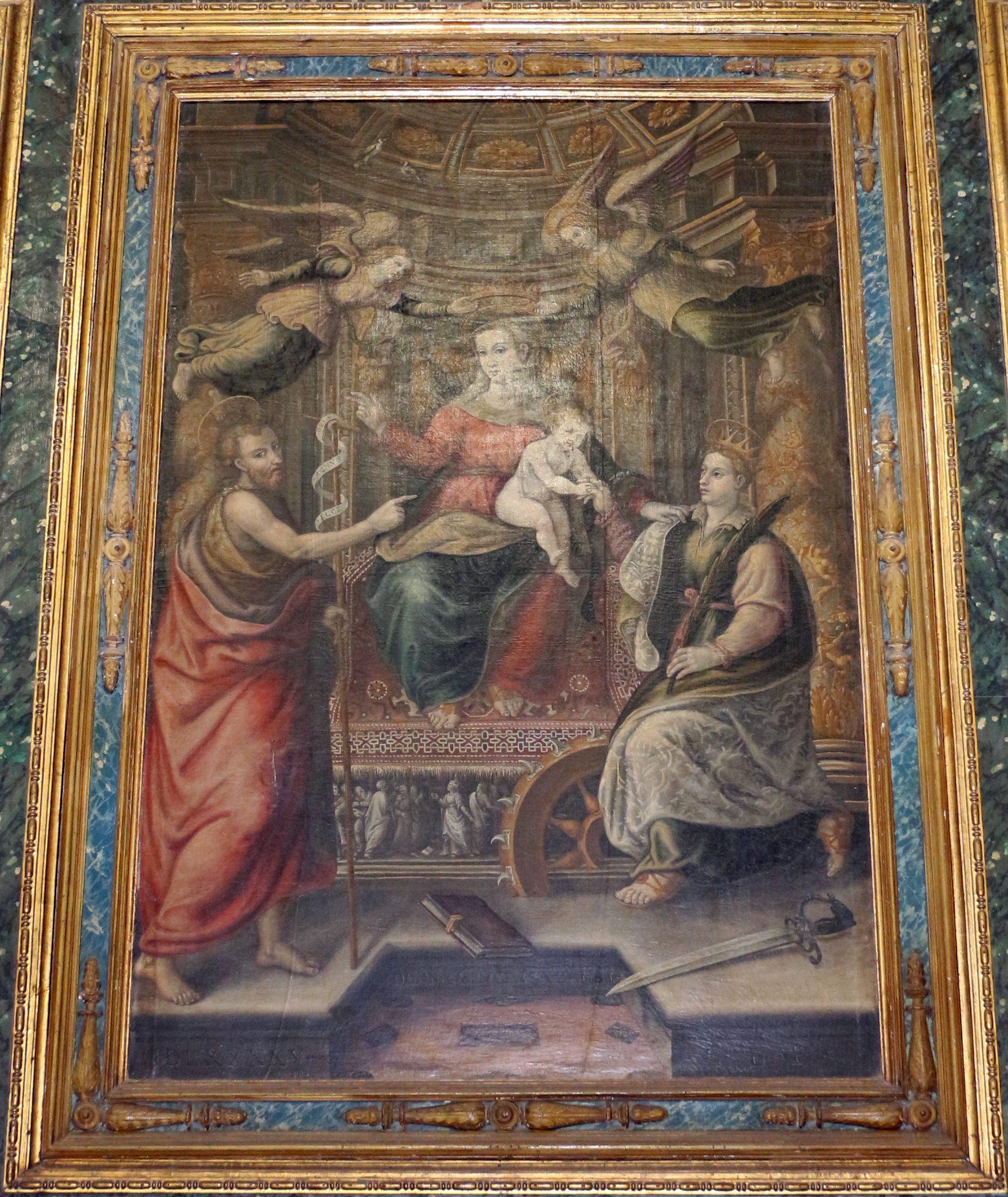
Enthroned Madonna and Saint, Church of Sant'Agostino in Gubbio

Giovanni Maria Baldassini (active 16th century) was an Italian painter of the late Renaissance period.

He was a pupil of Benedetto Nucci. He was active in Gubbio where he painted the "Trasfigurazione del Signore sul Monte Tabor e Santi (Basilica of Saint Ubaldo in Gubbio). In the latter, his native town, he painted a Madonna del Rosario (1620) for the church of San Nicolò in Cantiano.
