= Saint Ubaldo Day =

Italian festival

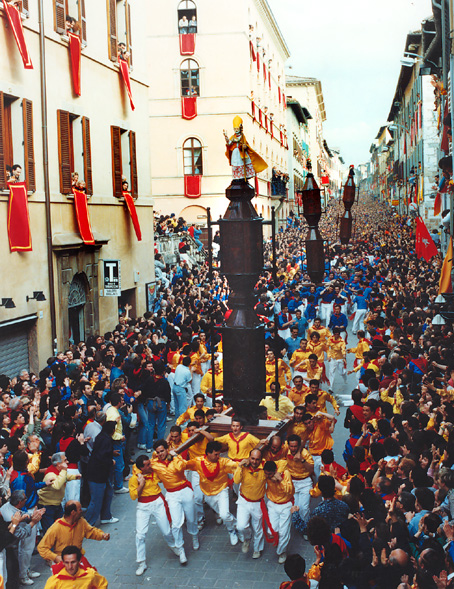
La Festa dei Ceri at Gubbio. The statue of Saint Ubaldo leads the procession.

Saint Ubaldo Day or Festa dei Ceri is an event celebrated on 15 May in the Italian town of Gubbio. It honors the life of Bishop Ubaldo Baldassini who was canonized as protector of Gubbio. It is also celebrated in the American town of Jessup, Pennsylvania.

The eve of his death anniversary, May 15, is marked in Gubbio by a procession known as Corsa dei Ceri. Jessup conducts a nearly identical "Race of the Saints" on the Saturday of Memorial Day weekend.

The procession through the streets features small statues of Saint Ubaldo, Saint George, and Saint Anthony, in order. They are mounted upon immense wooden pedestals each hoisted by a team of "Ceraioli" (runners) clad respectively in yellow, blue, or black.

== In Gubbio, Italy ==
In Gubbio, the procession ends by carrying the ceri to the Basilica di Sant' Ubaldo, which stands on top of Gubbio's Mount Ingino. In this case, an obvious competition occurs as Saint Ubaldo's ceraioli try to close the basilica doors before George and Anthony can join Ubaldo inside.

The event in Gubbio is bigger in many ways: a longer course, more participants and thousands more spectators, and a higher level of excitement and intensity.

The event in Gubbio may be a survival of a similar rite described in the pre-Christian Iguvine Tablets.

== In Jessup, Pennsylvania ==
=== Origin ===
The borough of Jessup, a suburb of Scranton, organized and presented to the Luzerne County court for incorporation in December, 1876, grew in subsequent decades along with the anthracite coal industry. The demand for miners brought many European immigrants to the Lackawanna Valley. Italians came to Jessup mostly from Gubbio and other communities of the Umbria region's Province of Perugia.

Jessup's new sizable Perugian enclave transplanted the tradition of La Festa dei Ceri in 1909. It continued only until 1952 but was revived for the borough's centennial celebration 24 years later. Certain years since then had up to 30,000 spectators joining Jessup's population of under 5,000 for the event, attracting national news media. Today, it is administered by the community's Saint Ubaldo Society and coupled with Jessup Hose Company No. 2's weekend-long carnival and picnic.

Gubbio, incidentally, is "Sister City" to Jessup resulting from a process that began in May, 1978 and was formally completed in May, 2004. As customary in Italy, Gubbio refers to Jessup as its "Città Gemellata" or "Twinned City". 2009 will be celebrated as the 100th anniversary of Saint Ubaldo Day in Jessup and numerous commemorative celebrations were planned by the Saint Ubaldo Society to mark the occasion.

=== Events ===
Saint Ubaldo Day begins early in the morning with roving musicians from Valley View High School about town and an intimate ceremony at Saint John's Catholic Italian cemetery. Members of all three families, Sant' Ubaldo, San Giorgio, and Sant' Antonio, then gather together for a frittata breakfast. Participants then process to Saint Mary's Assumption Church for a special Mass followed by "L'Alzata".

During the Alzata, three "stanga" (the H-shaped platforms to be placed upon teams' shoulders) are stood vertically as the large "ceri" (the pedestals) are fastened into them perpendicularly with wooden pegs. This hardware weighs approximately 400-450 pounds (900 in Gubbio) each and is reminiscent of the bier that carried Saint Ubaldo himself through Gubbio in proclamation of his heroism. The saints' statues are affixed after "capodieci" (team captains) climb atop the cross-members, where they bless the structures with holy water from "brocca", ceramic vases sent directly from Gubbio.

The afternoon is spent socializing among neighbors. Many households assemble in their yards and on their sidewalks to offer homemade food and wine to passersby. During these hours, the saints are carried leisurely throughout Jessup on display and for practice.

The procession is the main event and is termed a "race" more for its quick pace and level of excitement than for any competitive aspect. It begins in the uptown section of Jessup and winds its way through residential blocks before reaching the Church Street business district. This downhill stretch ends at Station Park in the opposite end of town. The course is reversed and climbs Church Street again before turning toward the Jessup Veterans' Memorial Stadium. Teams circle the fields three times in a spectacle called "I tre giri". Saint Ubaldo always "wins", though George and Anthony can gain favor by having their ceri removed more swiftly as teams lay the stanga at rest and hammer the wooden pegs out.
