= Umbria =

Region of Italy

- Region
- Flag Coat of arms

- Location of Umbria in Italy
- Coordinates: 43°06′43.56″N 12°23′19.68″E
- Country: Italy
- Capital: Perugia

Government
  - Type: Presidential system
  - President: Stefania Proietti (Ind)

Area
  - Total: 8,464.33 km^{2} (3,268.10 sq mi)

Population (2026)
  - Total: 850,627
  - Density: 100.495/km^{2} (260.282/sq mi)
- Demonyms: English: Umbrian; Italian: Umbro (man); Italian: Umbra (woman)

GDP
  - Total: €27.674 billion (2024)
  - Per capita: €32,519 (2024)
- Time zone: UTC+1 (CET)
  - Summer (DST): UTC+2 (CEST)
- ISO 3166 code: IT-55
- HDI (2021): 0.900 very high · 12th of 21
- NUTS Region: ITE
- Website: www.regione.umbria.it

Umbria (/ˈʌmbriə/ UM-bree-ə; Italian: [ˈumbrja]) is a region of central Italy. It includes Lake Trasimeno and Marmore Falls, and is crossed by the Tiber. It is the only landlocked region on the Apennine Peninsula. The capital is Perugia. With a population of 850,627, Umbria is the 4th least populous region of Italy.

The region is characterized by hills, mountains, thick forests, valleys, and historical towns such as the university centre of Perugia, Assisi (a World Heritage Site associated with St. Francis of Assisi), Terni, Foligno, Norcia, Città di Castello, Gubbio, Spoleto, Orvieto, Todi, Castiglione del Lago, Narni, Amelia, Spello and other small cities.

== History ==
=== Antiquity ===
The region is named for the Umbri people, an Italic people which was absorbed by the expansion of the Romans. The Umbri, unlike the Etruscans, with few exceptions did not live in an urban society, but occupied small dwellings located in the Apennines. Pliny the Elder recounted a fanciful derivation for the tribal name from the Greek ὄμβρος (ombros, "a shower"), which led to the idea that they had survived the Deluge familiar from Greek mythology, allowing them to claim to be the most ancient race in Italy. In fact, they belonged to a broader family of neighbouring peoples with similar roots. Their language was Umbrian, one of the Italic languages, related to Latin and Oscan. The town of Gubbio houses today the longest and most important document of any of the Osco-Umbrian group of languages, the Iguvine Tablets, written in Umbrian at the turn of the 2nd and 1st centuries BC. The northern part of the region was occupied by Gallic tribes.

The Umbri probably sprang, like neighbouring peoples, from the creators of the Terramara, and Proto-Villanovan culture in northern and central Italy, who entered north-eastern Italy at the beginning of the Bronze Age.

The Etruscans were the chief enemies of the Umbri. The Etruscan invasion extended from the western seaboard towards the north and east from about 700 to 500 BC. They eventually drove the Umbrians towards the Apennine uplands and captured 300 Umbrian towns. Nevertheless, the Umbrian population does not seem to have been eradicated in the conquered districts. The border between Etruria and Umbria was the Tiber river, as testified by the ancient name of Todi, Tular ("border").

After the downfall of the Etruscans, Umbrians aided the Samnites in their struggle against Rome (308 BC). Later communications with Samnium were impeded by the Roman fortress of Narnia (founded 229 BC on the place of the umbrian Nequinum, conquered in 299 BC). Romans defeated the Samnites and their Gallic allies in the battle of Sentinum (295 BC). Allied Umbrians and Etruscans had to return home and defend each of their territories against simultaneous Roman attacks, leaving the Samnites without their help at Sentinum.

The Roman victory at Sentinum initiated a period of integration under the Roman rulers, who established some colonies, such as Spoletium, and built the via Flaminia (219 BC). The via Flaminia became a principal vector for Roman development in Umbria. During Hannibal's invasion during the Second Punic War, the battle of Lake Trasimene was fought inside the borders of today's Umbria, but the local people did not aid the invader.

During the Roman Civil War between Mark Antony and Octavian (40 BC), the city of Perugia supported Antony and was almost completely destroyed by Octavian. In Pliny the Elder's time, 49 independent communities still existed in Umbria, and the abundance of inscriptions and the high proportion of recruits in the imperial army attest to its population. Under Augustus, Umbria became the Regio VI of Roman Italy.

Modern Umbria is different from Roman Umbria. Roman Umbria extended through most of what is now the northern Marche to Ravenna, but excluded the west bank of the Tiber, which belonged to Etruria. Thus Perugia was an Etruscan city and the area around Norcia was in the Sabine territory.

After the collapse of the Roman Empire, Ostrogoths and Byzantines struggled for supremacy in the region, and the decisive battle of the war between these two peoples took place near modern Gualdo Tadino.

=== Middle Ages ===
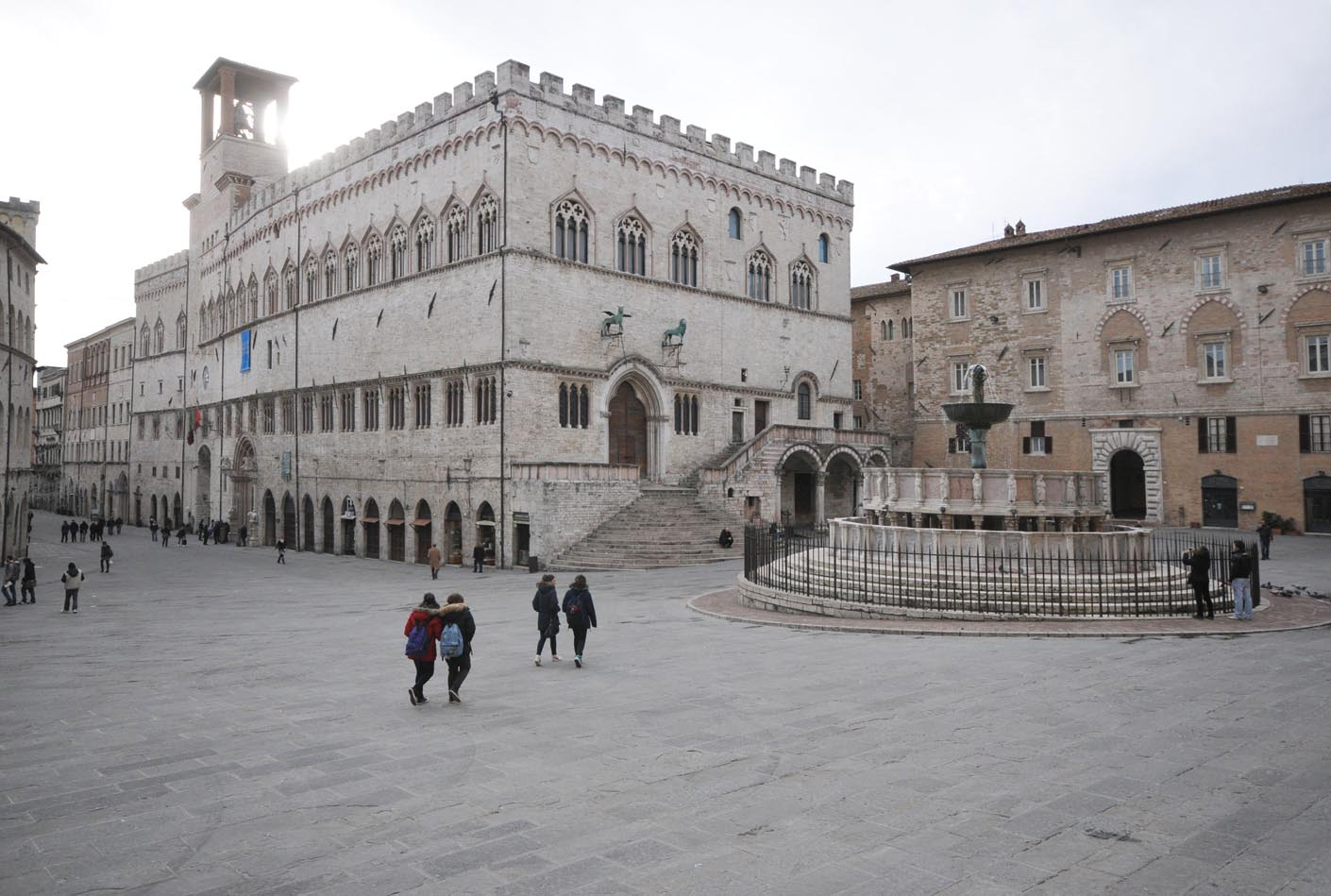
Medieval city centre of Perugia.

Soon after the end of the Gothic war, the Lombards invaded Italy and founded the duchy of Spoleto, covering much of today's southern Umbria, but the Byzantine were able to keep in the region a corridor along the Via Flaminia linking Rome with the Exarchate of Ravenna and the Pentapolis. The Lombard king controlled also the northern part of the region ruled directly by Pavia. When Charlemagne conquered most of the Lombard kingdoms, some Umbrian territories were given to the Pope, who established temporal power over them. Some cities acquired a form of autonomy named comune. These cities were frequently at war with each other, often in a context of more general conflicts, either between the Papacy and the Holy Roman Empire or between the Guelphs and the Ghibellines.

In the early 14th century, the signorie arose and the most important of them were those of the Vitelli in Città di Castello, of the Baglioni in Perugia and of the Trinci in Foligno, but the region was subsumed by the middle of the same century into the Papal States by Cardinal Albornoz, who in this way prepared the return of the pope from Avignon to Rome. Città di Castello was subsumed later into the Papal States by Cesare Borgia. During the 15th century Renaissance spread in the northern part of the region. It was in this period that humanists started to use again the ancient denomination of "Umbria" to name the area, which until then had been named "Ducato", after the Duchy of Spoleto in the southern part of it. The supremacy of the pope on Umbria was reinforced in 16th century through the erection of a fortress in Perugia by Pope Paul III, named after him Rocca Paolina. The papacy ruled the region uncontested until the end of the 18th century.

=== Modern history ===
After the French Revolution and the French conquest of Italy, Umbria became part of the ephemeral Roman Republic (1798–1799) and later, part of the Napoleonic Empire (1809–1814) under the name of department of Trasimène.

After Napoleon's defeat, the Pope regained Umbria and ruled it until 1860. In that year, during Italian Risorgimento, Umbria with Marche and part of Emilia Romagna were annexed by Piedmontese King Victor Emmanuel II, and the people of Perugia destroyed in the same year the Rocca Paolina, symbol of the papal oppression. The region of Umbria, with capital Perugia, became part of the Kingdom of Italy in the following year. The region, whose economy was mainly based on agriculture, experienced a dramatic economic shift at the end of the 19th century with the founding of the Acciaierie di Terni, a major steelwork placed in Terni because of its abundance of electric power due to the Marmore waterfall and its secluded position.

The region of Umbria at the time was somewhat larger than today, comprising Rieti to the south, now part of Lazio. Rieti was detached and added to the province of Rome (Lazio) in 1923. In 1927, the region of Umbria was divided into the provinces of Perugia and Terni.

During WWII, the industrial centers of the region like Terni and Foligno were heavily bombed and in 1944 became a battlefield between the allied forces and the Germans retreating towards the Gothic Line. In 1946, Umbria was incorporated into the Italian Republic as a region, comprising the two provinces of Perugia and Terni.

== Geography ==
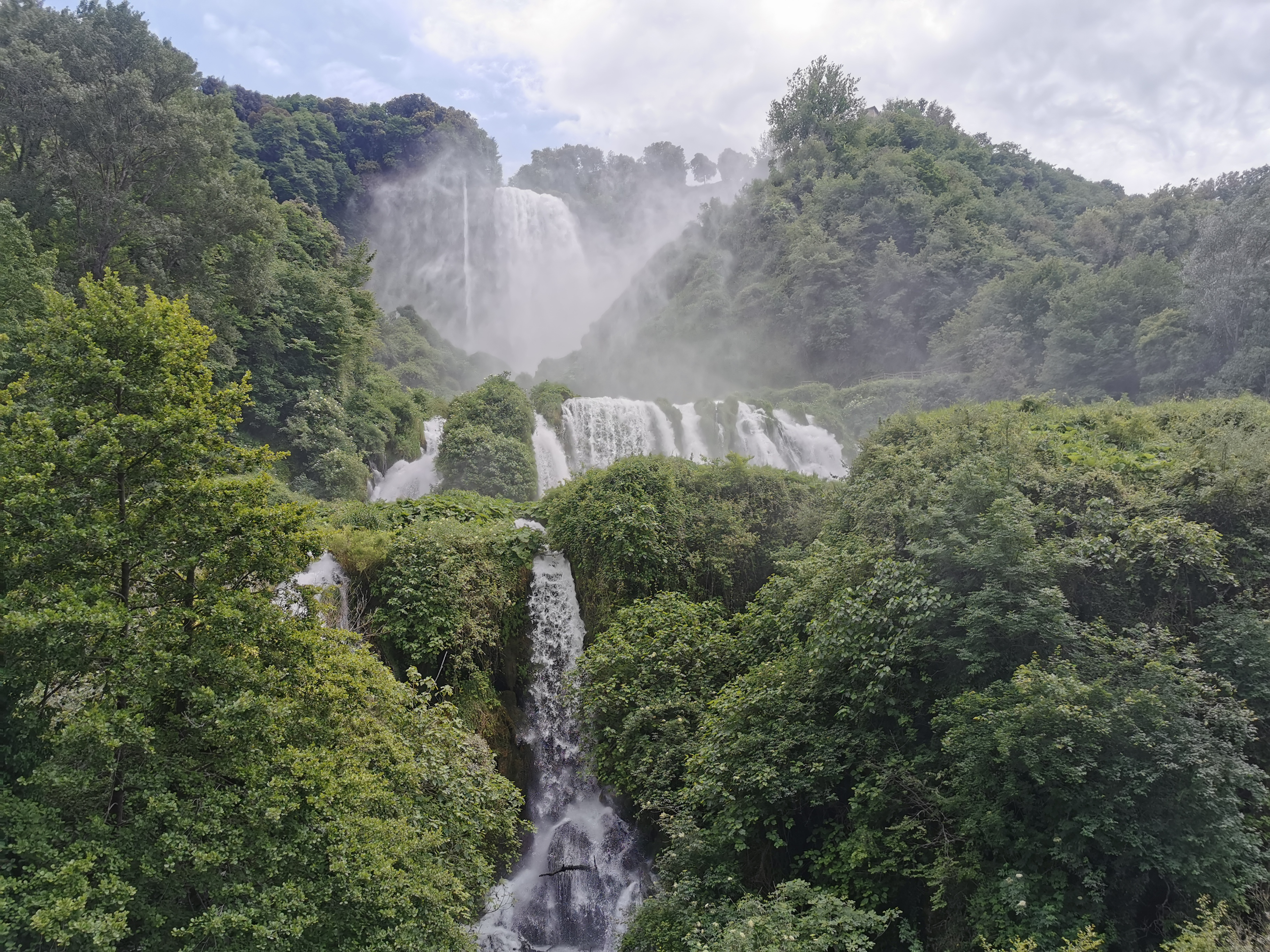
Marmore Falls.

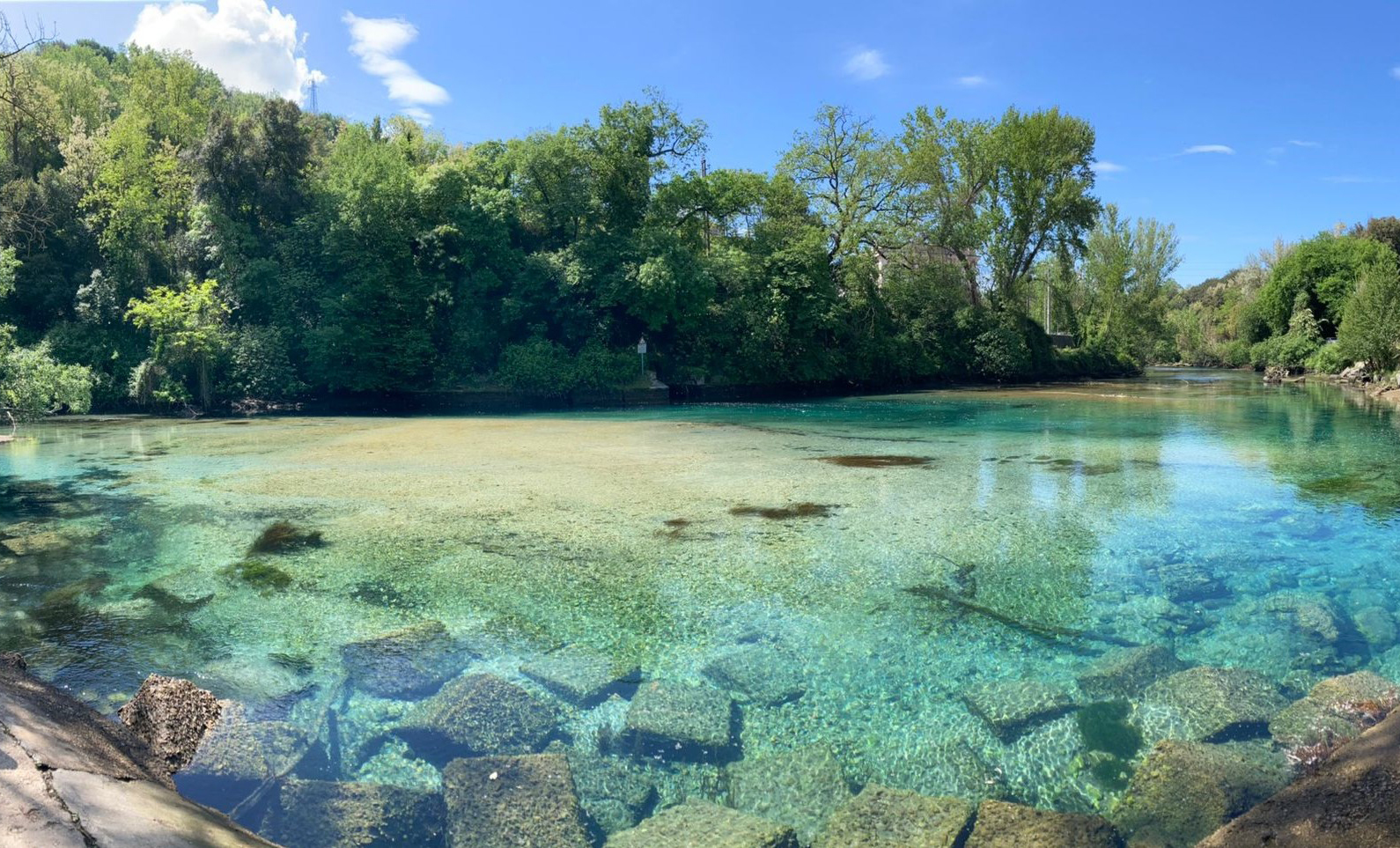
Gole del Nera in Narni.

Umbria is bordered by Tuscany to the west and the north, Marche to the east and Lazio to the south. Partly hilly and mountainous, and partly flat and fertile owing to the valley of the Tiber, its topography includes part of the central Apennines, with the highest point in the region at Monte Vettore on the border of Marche, at 2,476 metres (8,123 feet); the lowest point is Attigliano, 96 metres (315 feet). It is the only Italian region having neither a coastline nor a common border with other countries. The comune of Città di Castello has an exclave named Monte Ruperto within Marche. Contained within Umbria is the hamlet of Cospaia, which was a tiny republic from 1440 to 1826, created by accident.

Umbria is crossed by two valleys: the Umbrian valley ("Valle Umbra"), stretching from Perugia to Spoleto, and the Tiber Valley ("Val Tiberina"), north and west of the first one, from Città di Castello to the border with Lazio. The Tiber River forms the approximate border with Lazio, although its source is just over the Tuscan border. The Tiber's three principal tributaries flow southward through Umbria. The Chiascio basin is relatively uninhabited as far as Bastia Umbra. About 10 kilometres (6 miles) farther on, it joins the Tiber at Torgiano. The Topino, cleaving the Apennines with passes that the Via Flaminia and successor roads follow, makes a sharp turn at Foligno to flow NW for a few kilometres before joining the Chiascio below Bettona. The third river is the Nera, flowing into the Tiber further south, at Terni; its valley is called the Valnerina. The upper Nera cuts ravines in the mountains; the lower, in the Tiber basin, has created a wide floodplain.

In antiquity, the plain was covered by a pair of shallow, interlocking lakes, the Lacus Clitorius and the Lacus Umber. They were drained by the Romans over several hundred years. An earthquake in the 4th century and the political collapse of the Roman Empire resulted in the refilling of the basin. It was drained a second time, almost a thousand years later, during a 500-year period: Benedictine monks started the process in the 13th century, and the draining was completed in the 18th century.

The eastern part of the region, being crossed by many faults, has been often hit by earthquakes: the last ones have been that of 1997 (which hit Nocera Umbra, Gualdo Tadino, Assisi and Foligno) and those of August and October 2016 (which struck Norcia and the Valnerina).

In literature, Umbria is referred to as Il cuore verde d'Italia or The green heart of Italy. The phrase is taken from a poem by Giosuè Carducci, the subject of which is the source of the Clitunno River in Umbria.

== Government ==
Umbria was a former stronghold of the Italian Communist Party, forming with Tuscany, Emilia-Romagna and Marche what was then known as Italy's "Red Regions". Umbria was considered a stronghold of the Democratic Party and left-leaning parties for over 50 years; however, in 2019 the candidate of the centre-right coalition Donatella Tesei won the region's presidential election against her centre-left rival Vincenzo Bianconi, garnering 57.5% of the vote.

=== Administrative divisions ===
Umbria is divided into 2 provinces:

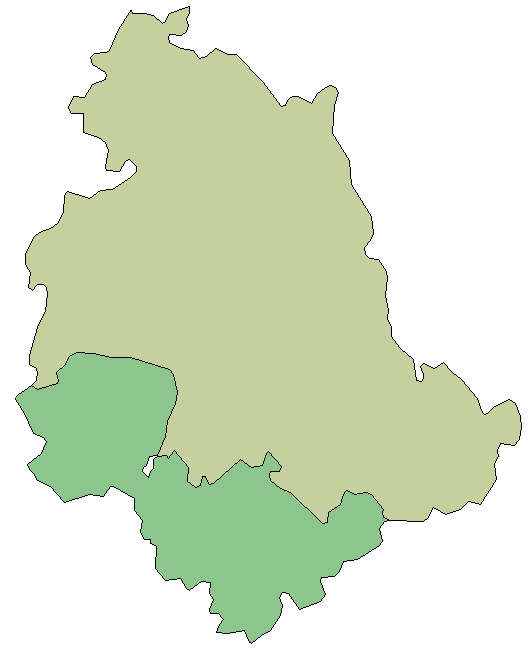

Province	Population (2026)	Area (km^{2})	Density	Municipalities
Province of Perugia	635,988	6,337.15	100.4	59
Province of Terni	214,639	2,127.18	100.9	33

== Demographics ==
Historical population
Year	Pop.	±%
1861	442,417	—
1871	479,149	+8.3%
1881	496,769	+3.7%
1901	578,769	+16.5%
1911	613,695	+6.0%
1921	657,952	+7.2%
1931	695,663	+5.7%
1936	722,544	+3.9%
1951	803,918	+11.3%
1961	794,745	−1.1%
1971	775,783	−2.4%
1981	807,552	+4.1%
1991	811,831	+0.5%
2001	825,826	+1.7%
2011	884,268	+7.1%
2021	858,812	−2.9%
Source: ISTAT

As of 2026, the population is 850,627, of which 48.6% are male, and 51.4% are female. Minors make up 13.6% of the population, and seniors make up 27.8%.

=== Immigration ===
As of 2025, immigrants make up 13.9% of the population. The 5 largest foreign countries of birth are Romania, Albania, Morocco, Ukraine, and Moldova.

== Economy ==
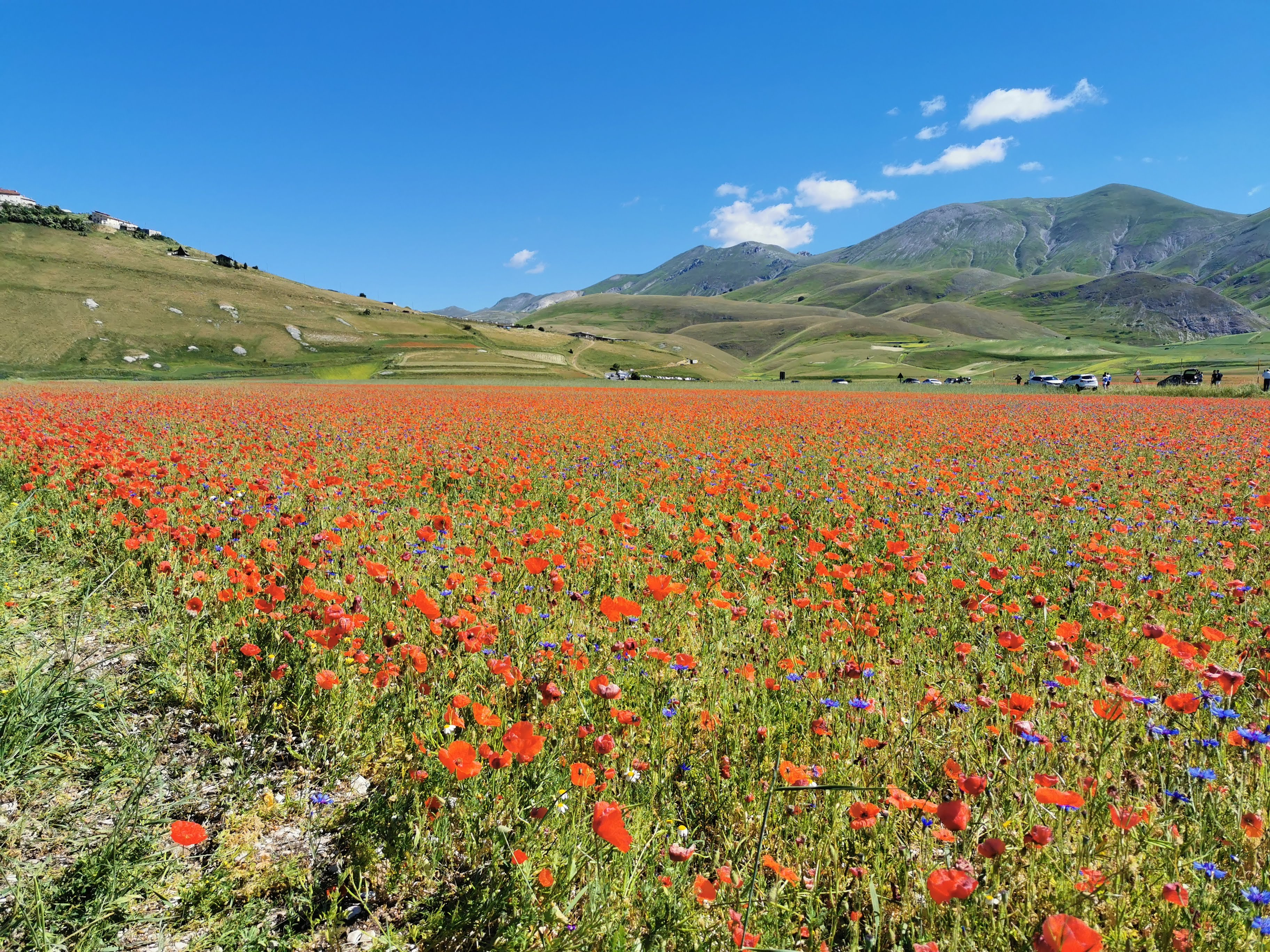
Piano Grande in Castelluccio with lentil fields in flower.

The present economic structure emerged from a series of transformations which took place mainly in the 1970s and 1980s. During this period, there was rapid expansion among small and medium-sized firms and a gradual retrenchment among the large firms which had hitherto characterised the region's industrial base. This process of structural adjustment is still going on.

Economically the most important region is the upper Tiber valley with Città di Castello. Terni steelworks (stainless steel, titanium, alloy steel) and processing companies (automotive, stainless steel tubes, industrial food facility) account for 20 to 25% of Umbria's GDP. In Terni there are also many multinational companies in the fields of chemistry, hydroelectric power, renewable sources of energy, and textiles (Alcantara, Cashmere). In the rest of the region the ornamental ceramics industry is much esteemed.

Umbrian agriculture is noted for its tobacco, olive oil and vineyards, which produce wines. Regional varietals include the white Orvieto, which draws agri-tourists to the vineyards in the area surrounding the medieval town of the same name. A notable wine is the Grechetto of Todi. Other noted wines produced in Umbria are Torgiano and Rosso di Montefalco. The Umbrian wineries are at the center of the "Cantine Aperte" or "Open Cellars" event, when local wine makers open their wineries to the public. Another typical Umbrian product is the black truffle found in Valnerina, an area that produces 45% of this product in Italy.

The food industry in Umbria produces processed pork-meats, confectionery, pasta and the traditional products of Valnerina in preserved form (truffles, lentils, cheese).

The unemployment rate stood at 8.2% in 2020.

=== Tourism ===
Umbria has many small and picturesque villages, 31 of them have been selected by I Borghi più belli d'Italia (English: The most beautiful Villages of Italy), a non-profit private association of small Italian towns of strong historical and artistic interest, that was founded on the initiative of the Tourism Council of the National Association of Italian Municipalities.

=== Umber ===
Umber

Color coordinates
- Hex triplet: #635147
- sRGB^{B} (r, g, b): (99, 81, 71)
- HSV (h, s, v): (21°, 28%, 39%)
- CIELCh_{uv} (L, C, h): (36, 15, 39°)
- Source: ISCC-NBS
- ISCC–NBS descriptor: Dark grayish yellowish brown
- B: Normalized to [0–255] (byte)

Umbria is the region where the umber pigment was originally extracted. The name comes from terra d'ombra, or earth of Umbria, the Italian name of the pigment. The word also may be related to the Latin word umbra, meaning "shadow". Umber is a natural brown or reddish-brown earth pigment that contains iron oxide and manganese oxide.

In the 20th century, natural umber pigments began to be replaced by pigments made with synthetic iron oxide and manganese oxide. Natural umber pigments are still being made, with Cyprus as a prominent source.

== Transport ==
=== Air ===
The region is served by Perugia San Francesco d'Assisi – Umbria International Airport which provides direct routes to other parts of Italy, UK and Europe. However, Rome Fiumicino Airport is often used by air travellers from the region as the airport provides more domestic and international destinations.

== Culture ==
=== Main artistic centres ===
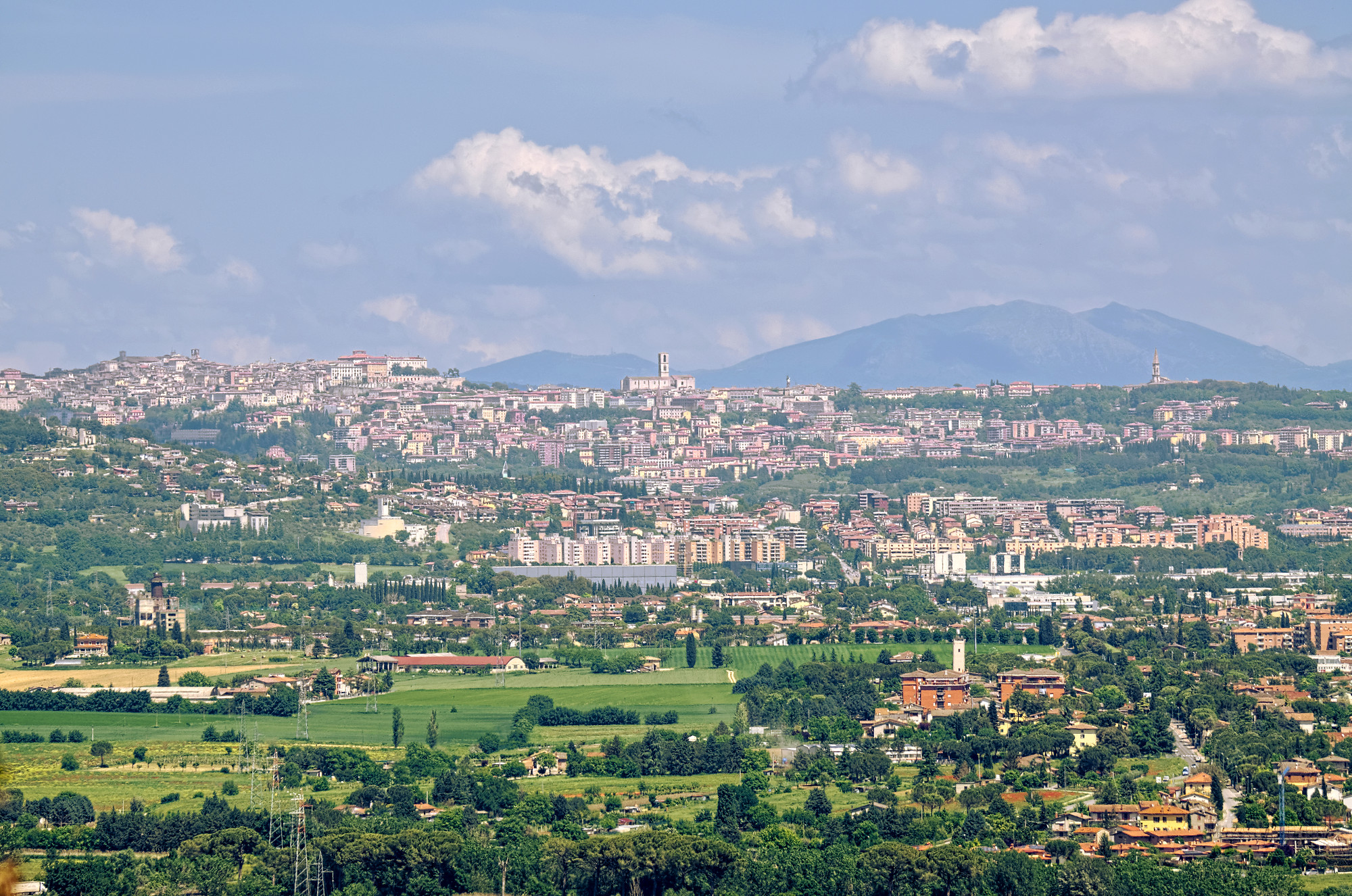
Perugia.

In the province of Perugia:

- Perugia
- Città di Castello
- Spoleto
- Assisi
- Gubbio
- Todi
- Foligno
- Castiglione del Lago
- Città della Pieve
- Spello

In the province of Terni:

- Orvieto
- Narni
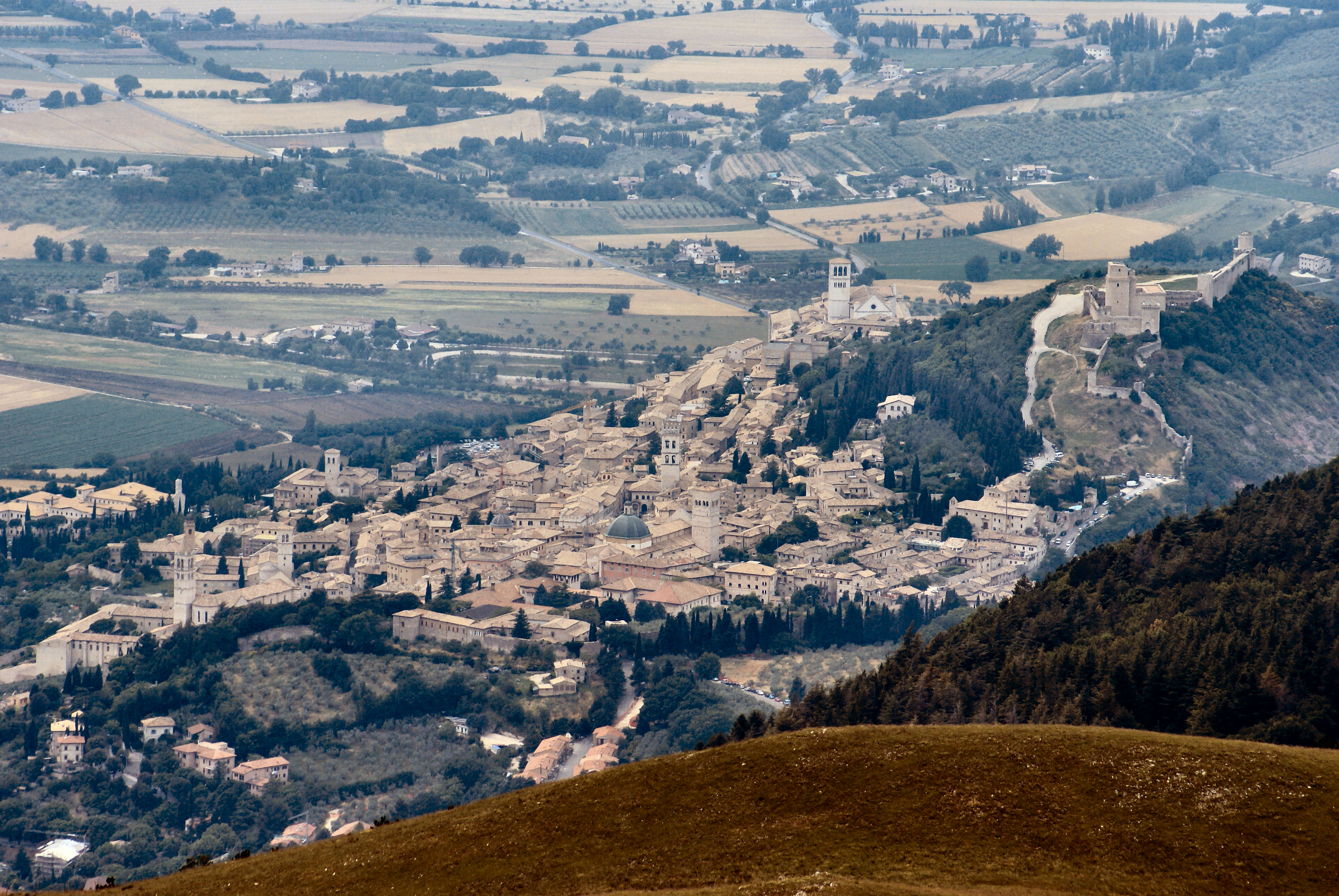
Assisi

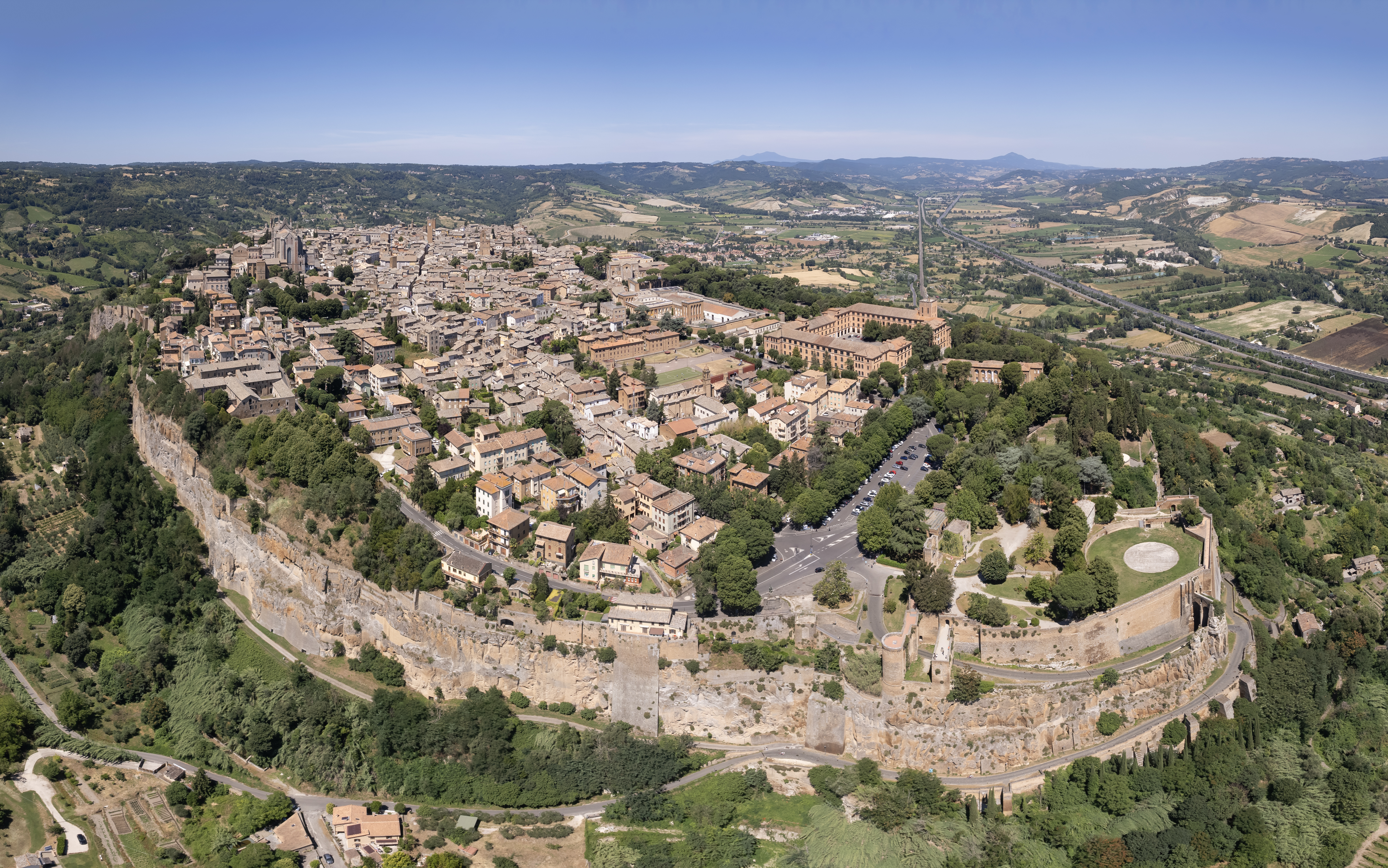
Orvieto

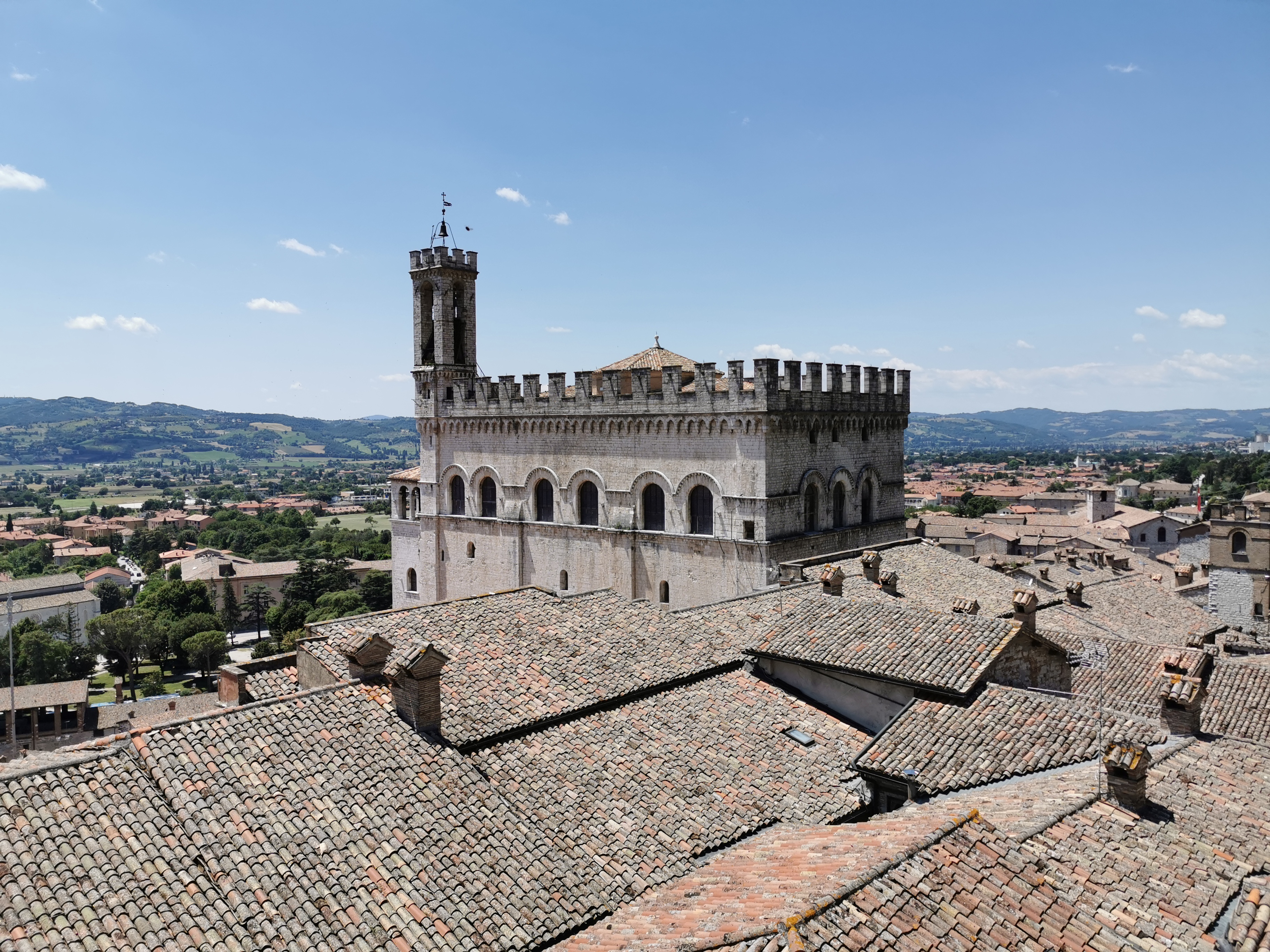
Gubbio

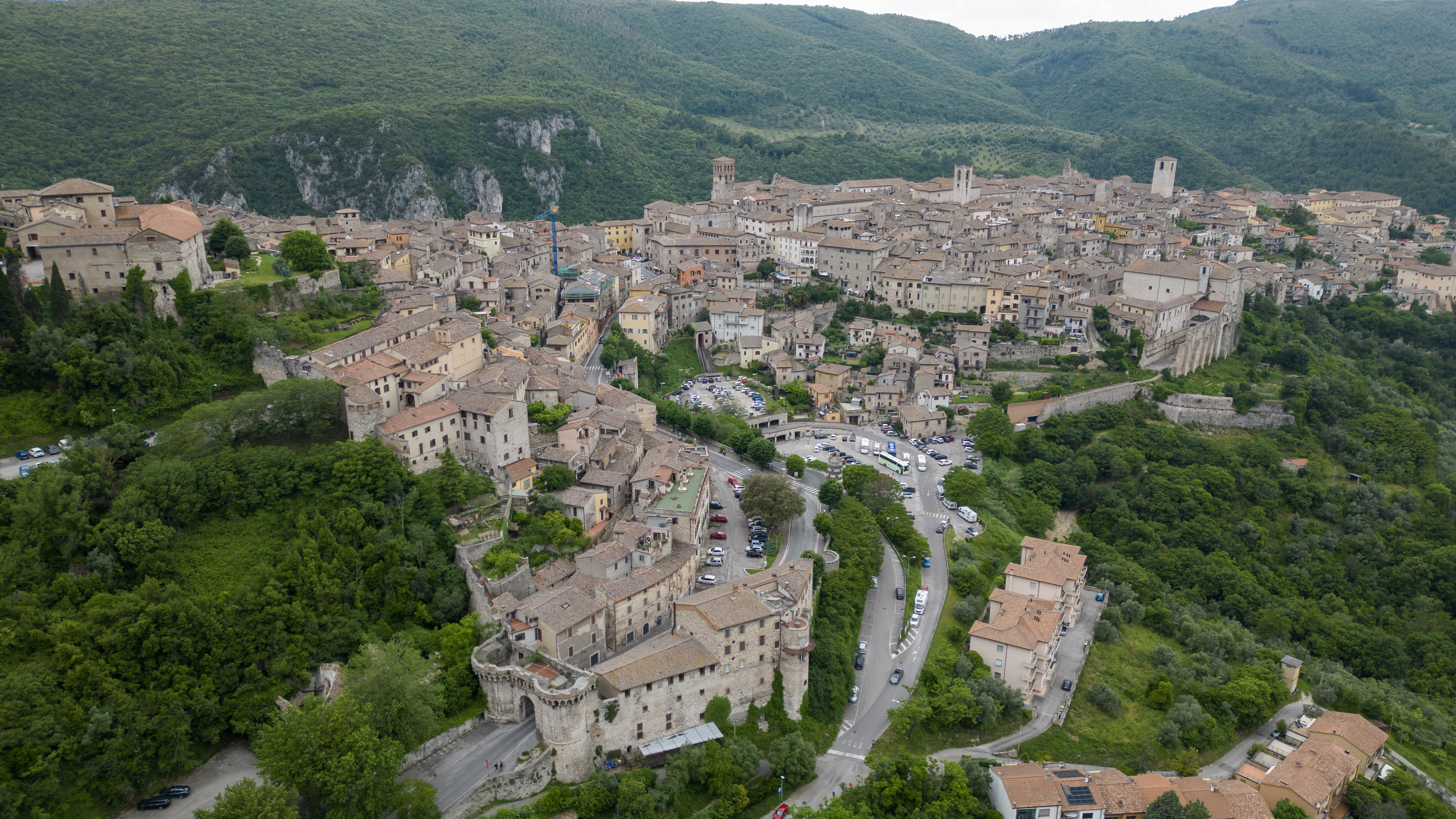
Narni

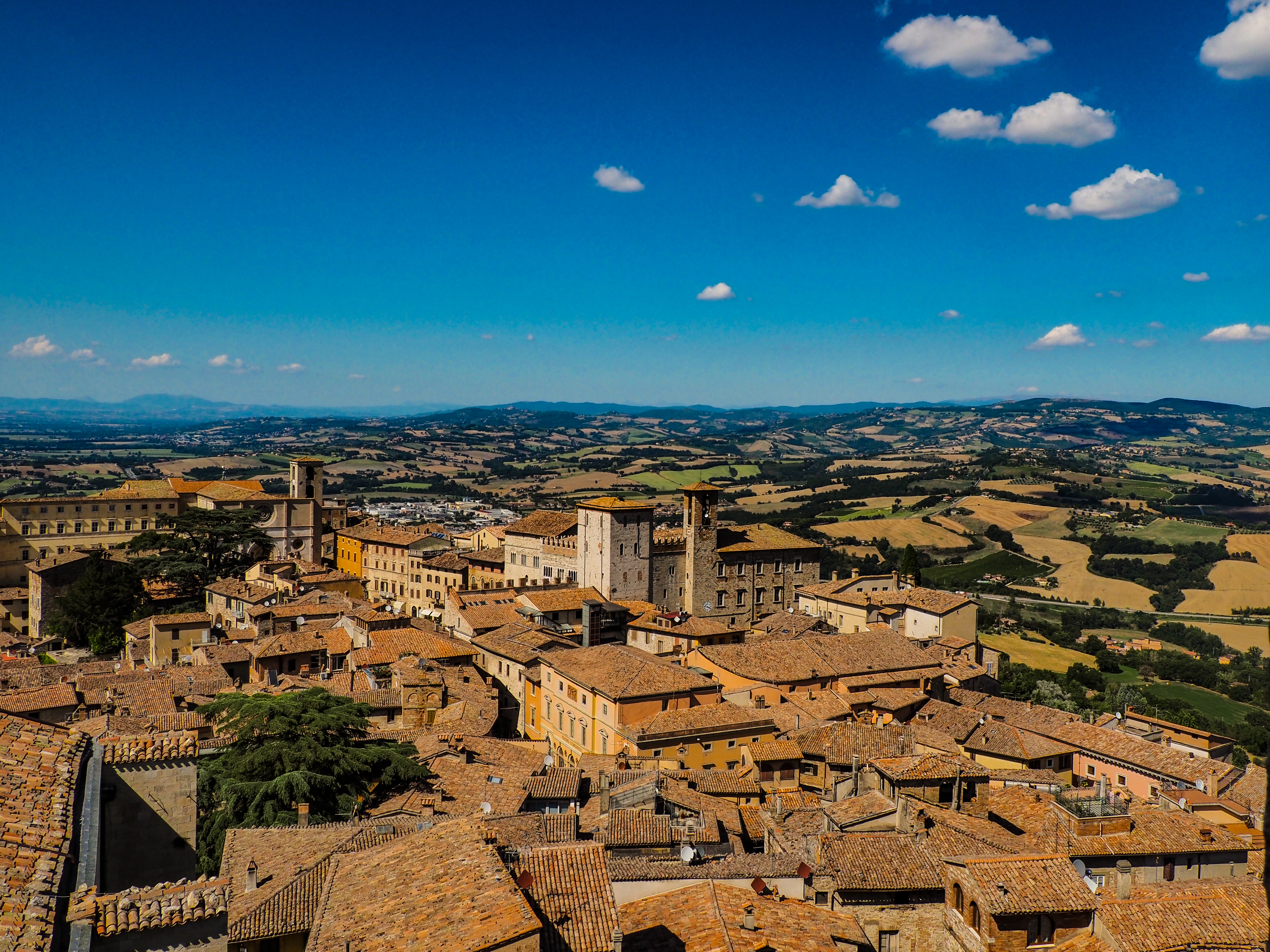
Todi

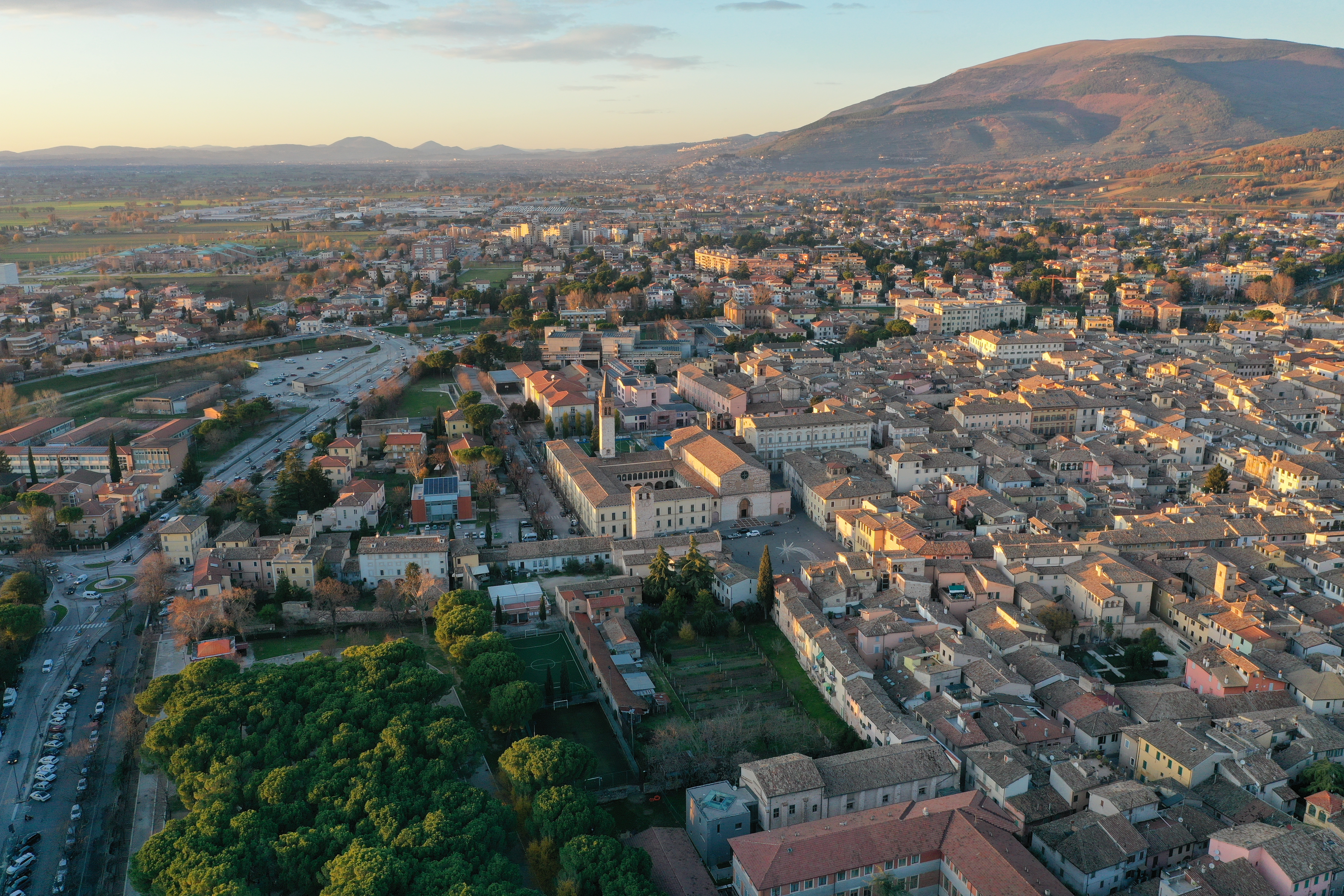
Foligno

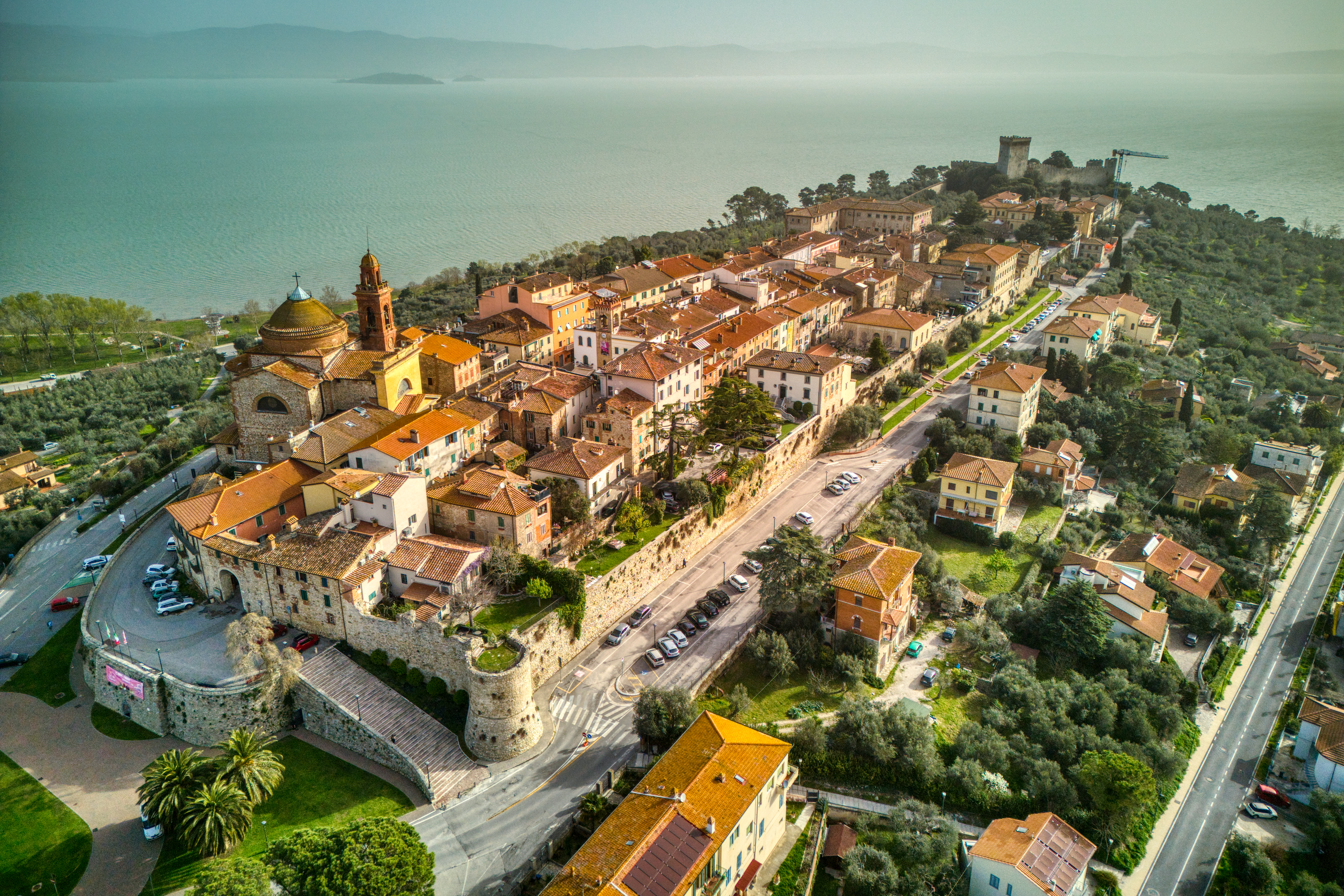
Castiglione del Lago

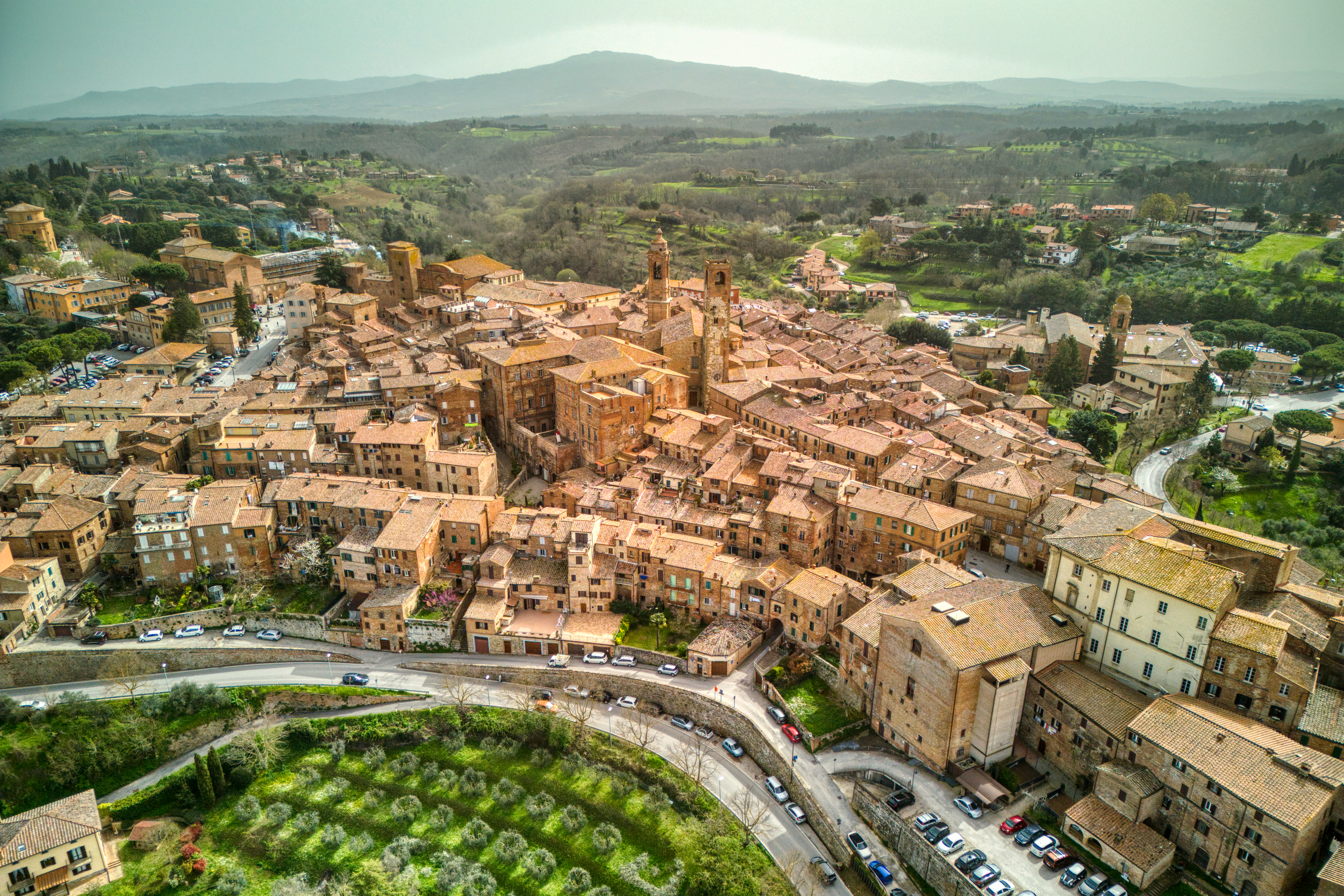
Città della Pieve

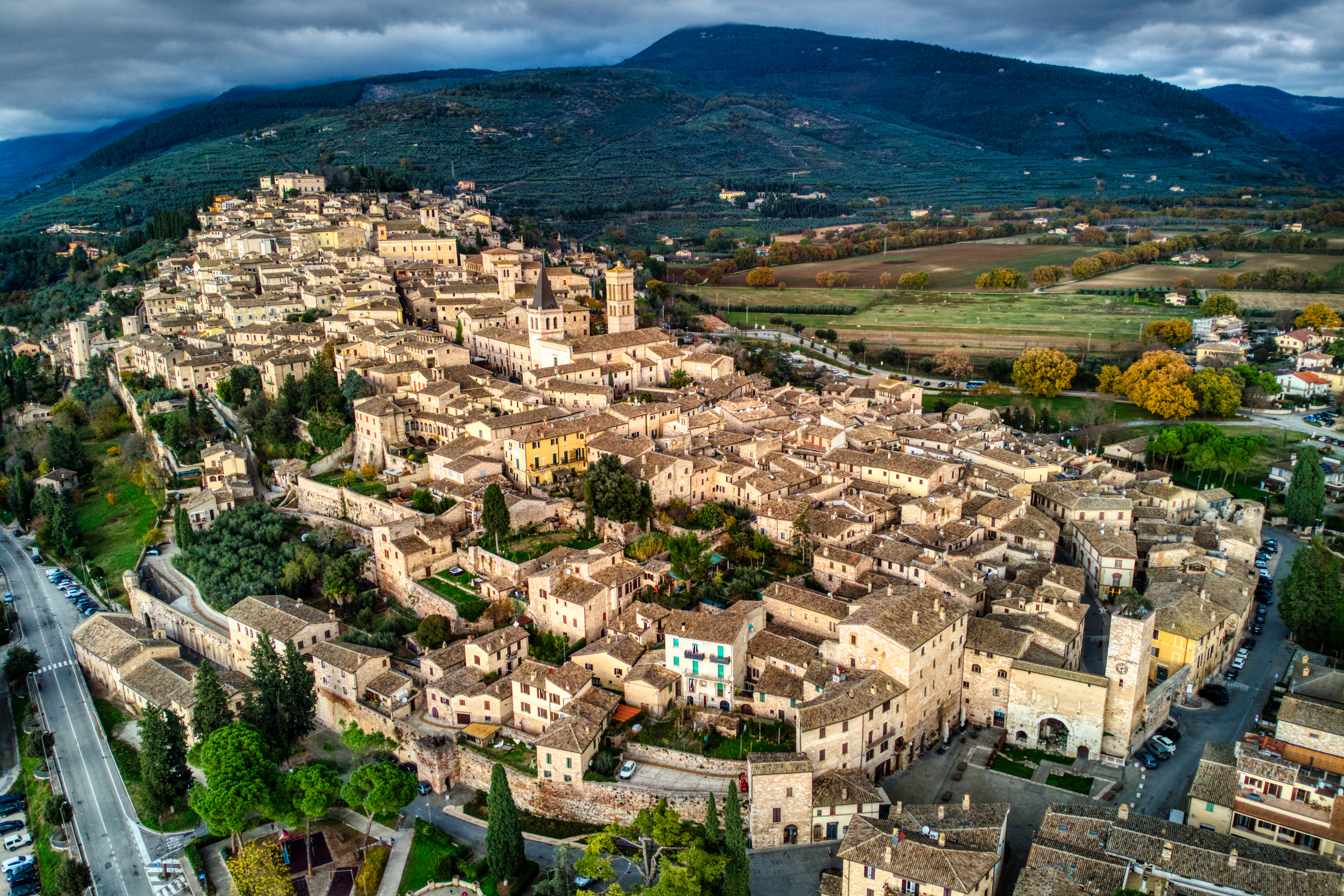
Spello
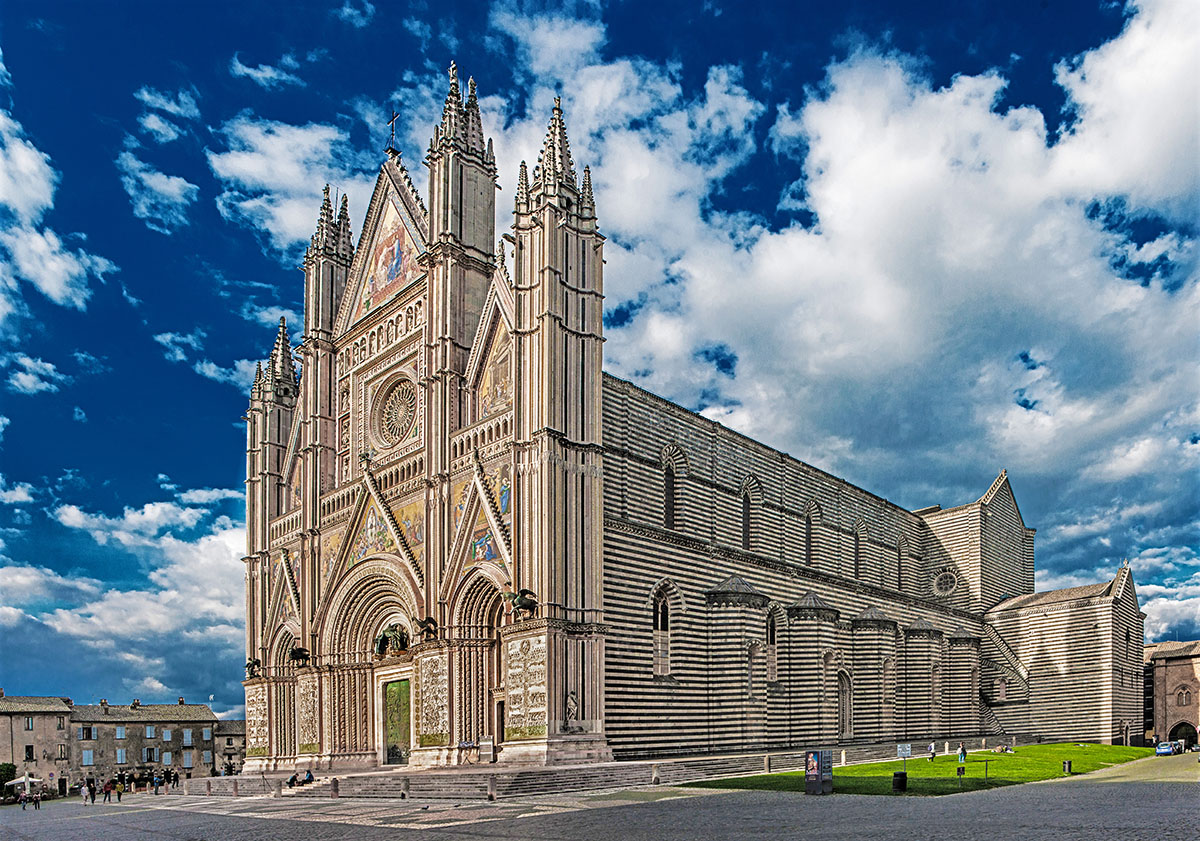
Orvieto Cathedral

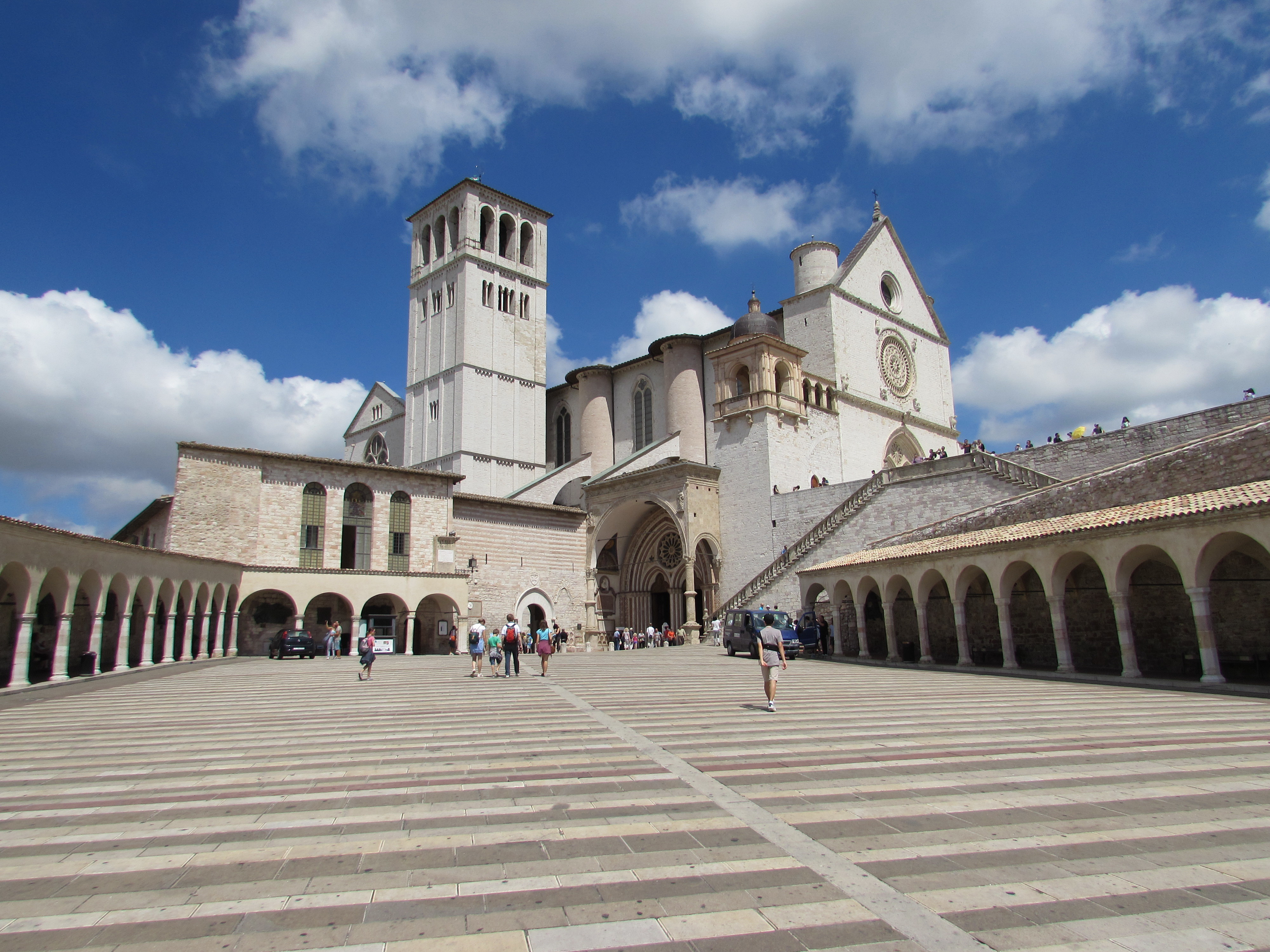
Basilica of Saint Francis of Assisi

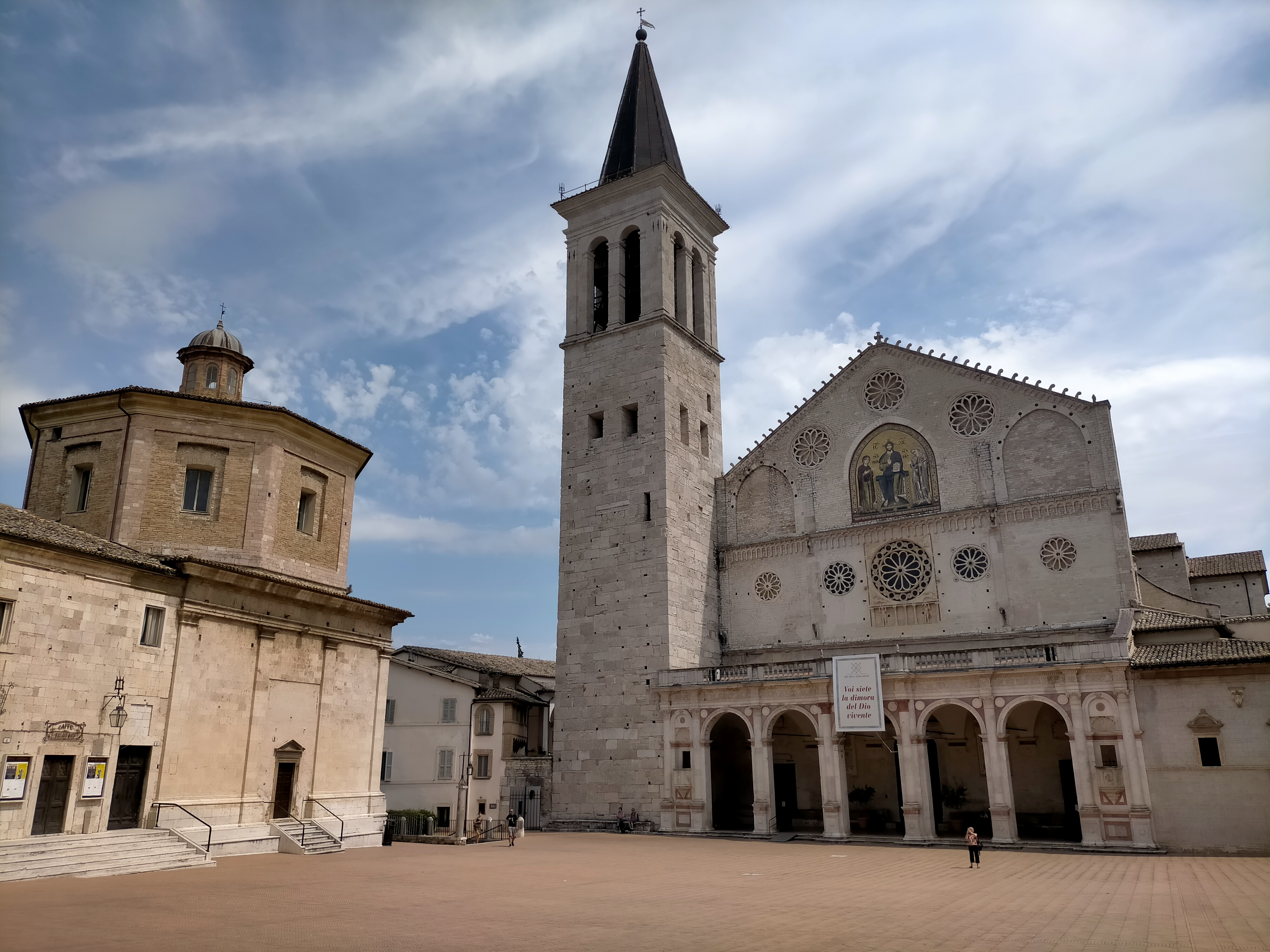
Spoleto Cathedral

=== Festivals ===
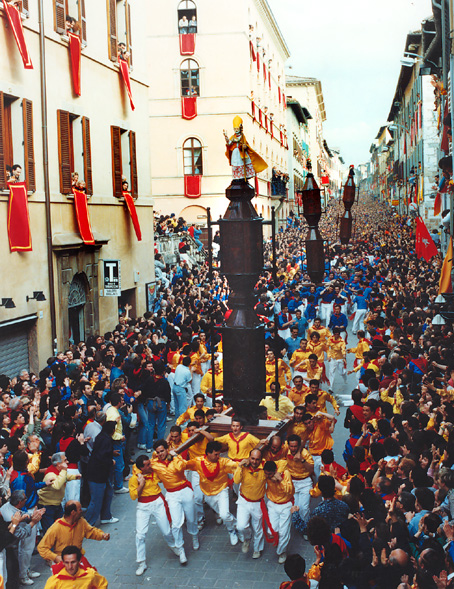
In Gubbio each year takes place the Corsa dei Ceri, or race of the "candles", which are symbolized by these tall wooden poles

One of the most important festivals in Umbria is "the festival of the Ceri (Candles)", also known as Saint Ubaldo Day in Gubbio. The race has been held every year since 1160, on the 15th day of May. The festival is focused around a race consisting of three teams of cerioli, carrying large symbolic "candles" topped by saints, including St. Ubald (the patron saint of Gubbio), S. Giorgio (St. George), and S. Antonio (Anthony the Great), and run through throngs of cheering supporters. The cerioli are clad in the distinctive colors of yellow, blue or black, according to the saint they support, with white trousers and red belts and neckbands. They travel up much of the mountain from the main square in front of the Palazzo dei Consoli to the basilica of St. Ubaldo, each team carrying a statue of their saint mounted on a wooden octagonal prism, similar to an hour-glass shape 4 metres tall and weighing about 280 kg (617 lb).

The race has devotional, civic, and historical overtones and is one of the best-known folklore manifestations in Italy, and therefore the Ceri were chosen as the heraldic emblem on the coat of arms of Umbria as a modern administrative region.

Umbria is not only known for its historical recollections such as the festival of the Ceri, Calendimaggio in Assisi and the giostra della Quintana in Foligno, but also for one of the biggest jazz music festivals called Umbria Jazz. Umbria Jazz was born as a festival in 1973 and since 2003 has been held in July in the Umbrian capital Perugia; it has become the fixed appointment of all jazz and good music lovers. Another important festival is the Festival dei Due Mondi (Festival of the Two Worlds), an annual summer music and opera festival which is held each June to early July in Spoleto.

== See also ==
- Lake Arezzo

== Bibliography ==
- Francesco Roncalli (1988). "Gli Umbri". In Giovanni Pugliese Carratelli (ed.). Italia: omnium terrarum alumna (in Italian). Milano: Scheiwiller.
- AA.VV. (2004). Umbria. Guida d'Italia (in Italian). Milano: Touring Club Italiano.
