= Flags of the regions of Italy =

The twenty Italian regions (including five autonomous regions) each have their own arms, as well as their own gonfalone; more recently they have taken into use normal flags as well. Many regional flags were adopted on 4 November 1995 for National Unity and Armed Forces Day of Italy.

Flag map of the regions of Italy

== Ordinary regions ==
Flag	Adoption	Region	Description
	21 May 1999 (modified in 2023)	Abruzzo	Main article: Flag of Abruzzo A burgundy field with the coat of arms of Abruzzo in the centre. White represents the snowy mountains, green the hills of the region, and blue the Adriatic Sea.
	10 August 2001 (modified in 2011)	Apulia	Main article: Flag of Apulia A white field with the words Regione Puglia ("Apulia Region") in gold letters at the top center, with the coat of arms of Apulia below; a green stripe towards the hoist-side, and a red stripe towards the fly-side. The shield, mounted by the crown of Frederick II, is composed of six bezants (coins) at the top, representing the six provinces of Apulia; prior to the creation of the province of Barletta-Andria-Trani in 2009, there were only five bezants; an octagon, representing the Castel del Monte built by Frederick II; an olive tree, a symbol of peace and brotherhood and a common feature of the Apulian countryside. The stripes of green and red, set against the white background, are a reference to the national flag of Italy.
	6 April 1999	Basilicata	Main article: Flag of Basilicata The flag is the coat of arms of Basilicata superimposed on the a field of azure. An unofficial variant has "Regione Basilicata" above the coat of arms, a gold-bordered white shield with four blue waves, representing the four major rivers of the region: the Basento, Agri, Bradano and Sinni.
	21 May 1999	Calabria	Main article: Flag of Calabria The flag is the coat of arms of Calabria superimposed on the a field of blue, with the words "Regione Calabria" above and below the arms. The coat of arms, adopted on 15 June 1992, is a disc, quartered in saltire, with, clockwise from the top, a pine tree, a Teutonic cross, a light blue truncated Doric column and a Byzantine cross.
	21 July 1971	Campania	Main article: Flag of Campania The flag is the coat of arms of Campania superimposed on the a field of azure. The coat of arms of Campania has as its coat of arms the one that the Maritime Republic of Amalfi gave itself at its dawn. This coat of arms consists of a red band on a white field.
	4 November 1995	Emilia-Romagna	Main article: Flag of Emilia-Romagna The emblem of the region superimposed upon a field of white, with a red bar and the words "Regione Emilia-Romagna" below. The emblem represents the geographical profile of the region. According to the designer, the curved line represents the Po river and nature, while the straight line represents the road and the work of man. The green colour represents that of the Po Valley.
	1995	Lazio	Main article: Flag of Lazio The flag is the coat of arms of Lazio surrounded by laurel and olive branches, surmounted by a golden crown on a sky-blue field with the words "Regione Lazio" in gold. The coat of arms of the Lazio region consists of an octagon edged in gold in which the coat of arms of the province of Rome are inserted in the centre and the coats of arms of the provinces of Frosinone, Latina, Rieti and Viterbo tied together by a tricolour ribbon.
	7 July 1997	Liguria	Main article: Flag of Liguria The flag is the coat of arms of Liguria superimposed on tricolour green, red and blue field. Each colour of the field has the following meaning: the green represents the Ligurian Alps and the Ligurian Apennines; the red represents the blood shed for Italian unification; the blue represents the Ligurian Sea. At the center of the flag is the coat of arms of Liguria: a stylized caravel, symbolizing the maritime traditions of the region and its great navigators, positioned below the historical flag of the Republic of Genoa (the current flag of the modern-day city of Genoa). The four six-pointed stars imposed on the Genovese flag represent the four provinces of Liguria: the Province of Genoa, the Province of Imperia, the Province of La Spezia, and the Province of Savona.
	4 February 2019 (de jure); 12 June 1975 (de facto)	Lombardy	Main article: Flag of Lombardy The flag is a field of green, representing the Po Valley, with the Camunian rose (a symbol of the region derived from a prehistoric drawing made by the ancient Camuni) in white in the centre, representing the light. In Camonica Valley, Camunian roses dates back to the Iron Age, particularly from the 7th to 1st centuries BC. These figures are placed mainly in the Middle Camonica Valley (Capo di Ponte, Foppe of Nadro, Sellero, Ceto and Paspardo), but numerous cases are in the Low Valley too (Darfo Boario Terme and Esine). The Camunian rose had originally a solar meaning, which then developed into a wider meaning of a positive power, to bring life and good luck.
	4 November 1995	Marche	Main article: Flag of Marche The flag of Marche bears a stylized woodpecker, overlapping a black shape to form a capital letter M, against a green-bordered shield with a white field. The woodpecker was the tribal totem of the Picentes, an Italic tribe who lived in most of the territory of present-day Marche. The bird's connection to the region is attested to in Greek and Roman literature.
	12 June 1975	Molise	Main article: Flag of Molise The flag is a field of light blue, with the coat of arms of the region (red with a diagonal silver band and an eight-pointed white star in the canton) in the centre. The words "Regione Molise" are in gold below.
	24 November 1995	Piedmont	Main article: Flag of Piedmont The flag of Piedmont is essentially the arms of the Prince of Piedmont, the title for the eldest son of the King of Sardinia. When Duke Amadeus VIII of Savoy gave his eldest surviving son the title of "Prince of Piedmont" in 1424, he added a heraldic label to the coat of arms distinguish it from the general coat of arms of the House of Savoy.
	3 February 1995	Tuscany	Main article: Flag of Tuscany The flag depicts a silver Pegasus rampant on a white field between two horizontal red bands. The Pegasus image on the flag derives from a coin made by the Florentine artist Benvenuto Cellini in 1537. This coin was created by Cellini in order to honour Cardinal Pietro Bembo. Bembo was instrumental in the development of the Tuscan language as a literary medium and was honoured with the representation of Pegasus due to its symbolism and ties with creation. As a result, the Pegasus came to be associated as a symbol of the Tuscan region.
	18 March 2004	Umbria	Main article: Flag of Umbria A green field with the regional symbol in the center with the stylization of the three candles of the Corsa dei Ceri held in Gubbio in province of Perugia on 15 May every year in honor of Sant'Ubaldo Baldassini.
	20 May 1975 (modified on 22 February 1999)	Veneto	Main article: Flag of Veneto The flag Veneto derives from the flag historically used by the Republic of Venice (697–1797), a maritime republic centered on the modern city of Venice. The coat of arms of the Region is set in a square in the center of the flag: the Lion of Saint Mark with the opened gospel (reading the Latin motto Pax tibi Marce evangelista meus, "Peace to you Mark, my evangelist") rests its paws on the landscape of Veneto: sea (the Adriatic), land (the Venetian Plain) and mountains (the Alps). Attached to the fly edge are seven tails. Each one bears in the middle the coat of arms of one of Veneto's seven province capitals, tricolour ribbon is to be knotted just below the flagpole finial.

== Autonomous regions ==
Flag	Adoption	Region	Description
	16 March 2006	Aosta Valley	Main article: Flag of Aosta Valley A vertical bicolour of black and red. The flag was created in 1942 from an idea by canon Joseph Bréan, who proposed its use in an anti-fascist brochure from 1942 entitled "The Great Aosta Valley". Father Bréan drew the colours of the 16th-century coat of arms of the Duchy of Aosta, a silver lion on a black shield with a red tongue, and a two-colour flag.
	17 October 2001	Friuli-Venezia Giulia	Main article: Flag of Friuli-Venezia Giulia The flag of Friuli-Venezia Giulia depicts a golden eagle facing to its right standing on white fortifications on a blue background. The colours (gold and blue) originate from the historic flag of Friuli used by the medieval Patria del Friuli – a state that was independent from 1077 to 1420 and ruled by the Patriarchate of Aquileia. The symbols of the eagle comes from the name of the ancient city of Aquileia, which, according to popular legend, derived from an eagle (Latin: aquila) who showed the first citizens the spot where the ancient city should be founded. The modern flag uses an eagle design found on an antique vase kept in a museum in Aquileia.
	1950 (modified on 15 April 1999)	Sardinia	Main article: Flag of Sardinia The flag is composed of the St George's Cross and four heads of Moors, which in the past may not have been forehead bandaged but blindfolded and turned towards the hoist. But already well-preserved pictures from the 16th century clearly show a forehead bandage (see gallery below). The most accepted hypothesis is that the heads represented the heads of Moorish princes defeated by the Aragonese, as for the first time they appeared in the 13th-century seals of the Crown of Aragon – although with a beard and no bandage, contrary to the Moors of the Sardinian flag, which appeared for the first time in a manuscript of the second half of the 14th century.
	4 January 2000	Sicily	Main article: Flag of Sicily The flag is characterized by the presence of the triskeles in its middle, the (winged) head of Medusa and three wheat ears, representing the extreme fertility of the land of Sicily. The triskelion symbol is said to represent the three capes (headlands or promontories of the island of Sicily), namely: Pelorus (Peloro, Tip of Faro, Messina: North-East); Pachynus (Passero, Syracuse: South); and Lilybæum (Lilibeo, Cape Boeo, Marsala: West), which form three points of a triangle from the historical three valli of the island. The flag is bisected diagonally into regions colored red, the color of Palermo, and yellow, the color of Corleone. These are the two cities that started the revolution of the Sicilian Vespers. The flag was used during the medieval revolution of the Vespers.
	12 June 1975	Trentino-Alto Adige/Südtirol	Main article: Flag of Trentino-Alto Adige/Südtirol The flag of Trentino-Alto Adige/Südtirol consists of a coat of arms, containing two eagles of San Venceslao (Trentino) and two Tyrolean red eagles (Alto Adige), historical symbols of the two provinces, which stand out against a white and blue background.

== See also ==
- Flag of Italy
- List of Italian flags
