= List of Italian flags =

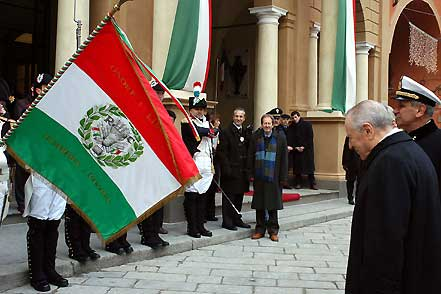
The former President of the Italian Republic Carlo Azeglio Ciampi honors the flag of Cispadane Republic, first Italian flag, during the Tricolour Day on 7 January 2004 in Reggio Emilia.

This is a list of flags used in Italy. For more information about the national flag, visit the article Flag of Italy.

== National flags ==
Flag	Date	Use	Description
	14 April 2006	National flag	A tricolour featuring three equally sized vertical pales of green, white, and red, the national colours of Italy, with the green at the hoist side (proportions 3:2).
	9 November 1947	Civil ensign	The flag of Italy with a shield divided into four squares representing the four Maritime Republics: Venice (represented by the Lion of Saint Mark, top left), Genoa (top right), Amalfi (bottom left), and Pisa (represented by their respective crosses). The ensign is similar to the one used by the Italian Navy, with the exception that the lion is not holding a sword but the book of the Gospel is open, and the emblem is not crowned.
	24 October 2003	State ensign	The flag of Italy with the state emblem.

== Military and law enforcement flags ==
Flag	Date	Use	Description
	9 November 1947	Naval ensign	The flag of Italy with a naval crown and a shield divided into four squares representing the four Maritime Republics: Venice (represented by the lion, top left), Genoa (top right), Amalfi (bottom left), and Pisa (represented by their respective crosses).
	9 November 1947	Naval jack	A shield divided into four squares representing the four Maritime Republics: Venice (represented by the lion, top left), Genoa (top right), Amalfi (bottom left), and Pisa (represented by their respective crosses).
	?	Carabinieri's flag	The Carabinieri's emblem on a blue and red background.
	?	Finance Guard's flag	A yellow and green background.
	?	State Police's flag	A golden eagle with shield bearing the cypher of the Italian Republic and a turreted crown on a crimson background.
	?	Firefighters' flag	The Vigili del Fuoco's emblem on a dark red background.

=== Army rank flags ===
Flag	Date	Use	Description
		Chief of staff of the Italian Army	White flag with a red rectangle inset from the border and with three red stars
		Four-star general	White flag with four red stars
		General of army corps	White flag with three red stars and a red line near the lower edge
		General of army corps	White flag with three red stars
		Divisional general	White flag with two red stars
		General of brigade	White flag with one red star

=== Naval rank flags ===
Flag	Date	Use	Description
		Commander-in-chief of the Italian Navy	A square edged in blue and divided into four squares representing the four Maritime Republics: Venice (represented by the lion, top left), Genoa (top right), Amalfi (bottom left), and Pisa (represented by their respective crosses).
		Ministry of the Italian Navy	A blue flag with a yellow rectangle inset from the border and with Italian Navy emblem
		Under Secretary of the Italian Navy	A blue flag with Italian Navy Emblem
		Chief of staff of the Italian Navy	A blue flag with a yellow rectangle inset from the border and with four yellow stars
		Great admiral of the Italian Navy	A blue flag with four yellow stars
		Squadron admiral of the Italian Navy	A blue flag with three yellow stars
		Division admiral of the Italian Navy	A blue flag with two yellow stars
		Rear admiral of the Italian Navy	A blue flag with one yellow star
		Captain division commander of the Italian Navy	A blue swallowtail flag
		Officer in command of the Italian Navy	A blue pennant

=== Air Force rank flags ===
Flag	Date	Use	Description
		Minister of the Italian Air Force	A blue flag with a red rectangle inset from the border and with Italian Air Force emblem
		Under secretary of the Italian Air Force	A blue flag with Italian Air Force Emblem
		Chief of staff of the Italian Air Force	A blue flag with a red rectangle inset from the border and with three red stars
		General of army of the Italian Air Force	A blue flag with three red stars
		Divisional general of the Italian Air Force	A blue flag with two red stars
		Brigade general of the Italian Air Force	A blue flag with one red star

== Standards ==
Flag	Date	Use	Description
	22 September 1965 – 21 March 1990	Standard of the president of Italy	A square blue flag with the emblem of Italy in the middle.
	22 March 1990 – 28 June 1992	Standard of the president of Italy	A square blue flag with a square flag of Italy in the middle.
	29 June 1992 – 13 October 2000	Standard of the president of Italy	A square blue flag with the emblem of Italy in the middle.
	14 October 2000 – 16 January 2003	Standard of the president of Italy	A square blue flag containing the flag of the Napoleonic Italian Republic, with the golden emblem of Italy on its green square.
	17 January 2003 – 13 April 2006	Standard of the president of Italy	A square blue flag containing the flag of the Napoleonic Italian Republic, with the golden emblem of Italy on its green square.
	14 April 2006	Standard of the president of Italy	A square blue flag containing the flag of the Napoleonic Italian Republic, with the golden emblem of Italy on its green square.
	16 May 1986	Standard of a substitute president of Italy	A square white flag with blue border, with the emblem of Italy in the middle.
		Standard of the Presidents of the Senate and the Chamber of Deputies	A rectangular white flag with two light blue rectangles inset from the border, with the emblem of Italy in the middle.
		Personal Standard of the President of the Senate (car's flag)	A square blue flag with the yellow emblem of the Senate in the middle, used as a custom on Senate's cars.
	17 July 2008	Standard of the prime minister of Italy	A rectangular blue flag with two golden rectangles inset from the border and with the Emblem of Italy (in natural colours) in the middle.
	23 April 2002	Standard of the Ministry of Defence	A rectangular blue flag with two golden rectangles inset from the border and with a star and the symbols of four Italian Armed Forces in the middle.
		Standard of the civil authorities	A rectangular white flag with two blue rectangles inset from the border and with the emblem of Italy (in natural colours) in the middle.

== Historical flags ==
=== Roman Empire Vexilloids ===
Flag	Date	Use	Description
	27 BC – 380 AD	Vexilloid of the Roman Empire.	The slogan SPQR (senātus populusque Rōmānus), "The Roman Senate and People," in gold on a field of crimson.
	380–395	Labarum of Constantine the Great	A crimson field with three dots which represents "medallions" which are said to have shown portraits of Constantine and his sons.
	395–476/480	Vexilloid of the Western Roman Empire.	A crimson field with the Chi Rho in gold in the center.

=== Preunification era ===
Flag	Date	Use	Description
	800–888	Imperial Oriflamme of Charlemagne	A three-pointed green field with eight golden crosses and six flowers.
	800–1420	Flag of the Judicate of Arborea	A white field with a tree in the center.
	831–1091	Flag of the Emirate of Sicily	A simple green field.
	1000–1406	Flag of the Republic of Pisa	A red field with a white cross in the center.
	1115–1251	First flag of The Republic of Florence	A red field with centred white cross.
	1130–1194	Banner of the Hauteville Dynasty	A blue field with a white and red checkered diagonal stripe.
	1160–1200	First flag of the Republic of Lucca	A horizontal bicolor of white and red, similar to the Polish flag.
	1171–1277	First flag of Milan	A white field with a red Maltese cross in the center with a three-tongued fringe at the fly.
	13th century	First flag of the Republic of Siena	A black field with a white vertical band at the hoist and a three-tongued fringe at the fly.
	1200–1799	Second flag of the Republic of Lucca	A blue field with a golden diagonal stripe with the word Libertas.
	1176–1395	Flag of the Commune of Milan	A white field with centred red cross, similar to the flag of England, both coming from Genoa.
	1251–1569	Second flag of the Republic of Florence	A white field with a red fleur-de-lis in the center.
	1258–1266	Banner of Manfred, King of Sicily	A white swallowtail flag with a black eagle in the center.
	1259–1323	Flag of the Republic of Sassari	Four-quartered field. A white cross in the first and fourth quarter (blue) and a white tower in the second and third quarter (red).
	1266–1442	Flag of the Kingdoms of Sicily and Naples under the Capetian House of Anjou	A blue field with several fleur-de-lis and a red label.
	1266–1442	Flag of the Kingdoms of Sicily and Naples under the Capetian House of Anjou (variant)	A blue field with several fleur-de-lis and a red label.
	1277–1395	Second flag of Milan	A white field with a blue snake devouring a child in the center.
	1282–1296	First flag of the Kingdom of Sicily under the Crown of Aragon	The Aragonese Senyera in the first and fourth quarters and a Swabian eagle in the second and third quarters.
	1290–1555	Second flag of the Republic of Siena	A horizontal bicolour of white and black.
	1296–1410	Second flag of the Kingdom of Sicily under the Crown of Aragon	Similar to the Aragonese Senyera, but with two white triangles at the hoist and fly, with an eagle inside of each.
	14th century	Gorizia	A square flag with a blue background on the right and the lion of Gorizia. The lion was the original coat of arms of the County of Gorizia, while the bar on the left was taken from the flag of vassalage to the Patriarchate of Aquileia, which existed in 1338.
	1339–1797	Flag of the Republic of Genoa	White field with centred red cross, similar to the flag of England.
	1395–1499	State flag (Vexillum publicum) of the City of Milan	White field with centred red cross, similar to the flag of England.
	1395–1499	Third flag of Milan	The Imperial Eagle of the Holy Roman Empire in the first and fourth quarters and the snake of Milan in the second and third quarters.
	1398–1701	First flag of the Principality of Piombino	A white field with a checkered diagonal red stripe.
	1410–1516	Third flag of the Kingdom of Sicily under the Crown of Aragon	An inverted version of the second flag.
	1416–1785	Flag of the Duchy of Savoy	A red field with centred white cross.
	1442–1516	Flag of the Kingdom of Naples under the Crown of Aragon	The Aragonese Senyera in the first and fourth quarters and the stripes of the Árpád dynasty, the fleur-de-lis of Anjou, and the Jerusalem cross in the second and third quarters.
	1443–1523	First flag of the Duchy of Urbino	A banner of arms with the symbols of the Holy Roman Empire, the House of Montefeltro, and the Papal States.
	1447–1450	State flag (Vexillum publicum) of the Golden Ambrosian Republic	A white field with centred red cross, with the republic's seal.
	1452–1830	First flag of the Duchy of Modena and Reggio	A crowned white eagle on a blue field.
	1473–1829	Flag of the Duchy of Massa and Carrara	A white field with the coat of arms in the center.
	1499–1526	Fourth flag of Milan (under French rule)	The French royal flag in the first and fourth quarters and the snake of Milan in the second and third quarters.
	1523–1625	Second flag of the Duchy of Urbino	A yellow swallow-tailed field with a disc which contains the symbol of the House of Montefeltro.
	1545–1731	First flag of the Duchy of Parma and Piacenza	A yellow field with six blue fleur-de-lis in the center.
	1562–1737	First flag of the Grand Duchy of Tuscany	A white field with the coat of arms of the Medici family in the center.
	1659–1675	The Contarina flag of the Republic of Venice	A gold Lion of St. Mark on a field of dark red accompanied by a six-tongued fringe at the fly.
	1701–1803	Second flag of the Principality of Piombino	A white field with the coat of arms in the center.
	1765–1800	Second flag of the Grand Duchy of Tuscany	A horizontal triband of red, white, and red with the greater coat of arms in the center.
	1815–1848	Second flag of the Grand Duchy of Tuscany	A horizontal triband of red, white, and red with the greater coat of arms in the center.
	1849–1860	Second flag of the Grand Duchy of Tuscany	A horizontal triband of red, white, and red with the greater coat of arms in the center.
	1785–1802	First flag of the Kingdom of Sardinia	Blue with the cross of savoy occupying one quarter of the field and placed in the canton.
	1799–1801	Third flag of the Republic of Lucca	A horizontal tricolour of green, white, and red.
	1801–1805	Fourth and final flag of the Republic of Lucca	A white field with a centered red diamond and with a blue border.
	1801–1807	Flag of the Kingdom of Etruria	Five alternating stripes of blue and white with the coat of arms in the center.
	1802–1814	Second flag of the Kingdom of Sardinia	Blue with the St George's Cross and four heads of Moors occupying one quarter of the field and placed in the canton.
	1814–1816	Third flag of the Kingdom of Sardinia	Blue with a canton containing the cross of savoy and two St George's Crosses in the first and fourth quarters (the first with four heads of Moors).
	1815–1818	First flag of the Duchy of Lucca	A horizontal bicolour of yellow and red.
	1815–1847	Second flag of the Duchy of Parma and Piacenza	A vertical bicolour of red and white.
	1815–1848	Second flag of the Grand Duchy of Tuscany (lesser arms variant)	A horizontal triband of red, white, and red, with the lesser coat of arms in the center.
	1849–1860	Second flag of the Grand Duchy of Tuscany (lesser arms variant)	A horizontal triband of red, white, and red, with the lesser coat of arms in the center.
	1815–1866	Flag of the Kingdom of Lombardy-Venetia	A horizontal triband of red, white, and red.
	1815–1866	Flag of the viceroy of the Kingdom of Lombardy-Venetia.	A golden flag with a black-and-gold zigzag border, showing a crowned Habsburg eagle with sword and scepter in one set of talons, a globus cruciger in the other, crowned with the Iron Crown, and a chest‑shield with the Order of the Golden Fleece and symbols of Milan and Venice.
	1816–1848	Civil version of the Fourth flag of the Kingdom of Sardinia	Blue with a combination of the crosses of savoy and St George occupying one quarter of the field and is placed in the canton.
	1816–1848	State version of the Fourth flag of the Kingdom of Sardinia	Blue with a combination of the crosses of savoy and St George occupying one quarter of the field and is placed in the canton, with a crown on top in the top left.
	1816–1848	Flag of the Kingdom of the Two Sicilies	A white field with the arms of the King of the Two Sicilies in the center.
	1849–1860	Flag of the Kingdom of the Two Sicilies	A white field with the arms of the King of the Two Sicilies in the center.
	1818–1824	Second flag of the Duchy of Lucca	A white field with the coat of arms in the center and a bicolour of yellow and red in the canton.
	1824–1847	Third and final flag of the Duchy of Lucca	A white field with the coat of arms in the center and a bicolour of yellow and red in the canton.
	1830–1859	Second flag of the Duchy of Modena and Reggio	A horizontal triband of red, white, and red, with a centred vertical triband of blue, white, and blue, with the coat of arms in the center. The civil variant lacked the coat of arms.
	1830–1859	Second flag of the Duchy of Modena and Reggio (civil variant)	A horizontal triband of red, white, and red, with a centred vertical triband of blue, white, and blue, with the coat of arms in the center. The civil variant lacked the coat of arms.
	1848–1849	Third flag of the Duchy of Parma and Piacenza	A horizontal bicolour of yellow and blue.
	1849	Revolutionary flag of Brescia	
	1850–1851	Fourth flag of the Duchy of Parma and Piacenza	Twelve radiating alternating stripes of blue and yellow.
	1851–1859	Fifth and final flag of the Duchy of Parma and Piacenza	Eight radiating alternating stripes of blue and yellow with a red border.

=== Napoleonic era ===
Flag	Date	Use	Description
	1797	Flag of the Cispadane Republic	A horizontal tricolour flag of red (top), white, and green. In the centre, the emblem of the republic, while on the sides the letters "R" and "C" were shown, the initials of the two words that form the name of the "Repubblica Cispadana". The coat of arms of the Cispadan Republic contained a quiver with four arrows that symbolized the four cities of the Cispadan congress.
	1798–1802	Flag of the Transpadane Republic	A tricolour featuring three equally sized vertical pales of green, white, and red, the national colours of Italy, with the green at the hoist side.
	1797–1798	First flag of the Cisalpine Republic	A horizontal tricolour flag with the top green, white in the centre, and red at the bottom.
	1798–1802	Second flag of the Cisalpine Republic	A square tricolour featuring three equally sized vertical pales of green, white, and red, the national colours of Italy, with the green at the hoist side.
	1802–1805	Flag of the Italian Republic	A composition formed by a green square inserted in a white diamond, in turn included in a red box.
	1802–1805	Naval flag of the Italian Republic	A composition formed by a green square inserted in a white diamond, in turn included in a red box.
	1805–1814	Flag of the Kingdom of Italy	A composition formed by a green rectangle inserted in a white diamond, in turn included in a red box, with an imperial eagle in the center.
	1805–1814	Flag of the Principality of Lucca and Piombino	A horizontal tricolour of blue, white, and red.
	1806–1808	First flag of the Napoleonic Kingdom of Naples	A horizontal tricolour of white, red, and black.
	1808–1811	Second flag of the Napoleonic Kingdom of Naples	A composition formed by a white diamond, in turn included in a red and black box, with the coat of arms in the center.
	1811–1815	Third flag of the Napoleonic Kingdom of Naples	A blue field with a checkered border of red and white and the coat of arms off-centred toward the hoist. The civil variant lacked the coat of arms.
	1811–1815	Third flag of the Napoleonic Kingdom of Naples (civil variant)	A blue field with a checkered border of red and white and the coat of arms off-centred toward the hoist. The civil variant lacked the coat of arms.

=== Unification and Kingdom of Italy ===
Flag	Date	Use	Description
	1831	Flag of the Italian United Provinces	A tricolour featuring three equally sized vertical pales of green, white, and red, the national colours of Italy, with the green at the hoist side.
	1831	Flag of the Young Italy	A horizontal tricolour flag with the top red, white in the centre, and green at the bottom, with the inscription "UNIONE, FORZA E LIBERTA'!!"
	1848	Flag of the Grand Duchy of Tuscany during the First Italian Independence War	The flag bears the coat of arms of the Habsburg-Lorraine family, decorated with Italian tricolours; note, however, that the coat of arms bears the red-white-red flag of Austria, the opponent of Italian unification.
	1848–1849	Flag of the Kingdom of the Two Sicilies	A white flag with Two Sicilies coat of arms, with red and green border.
	1848–1849	Flag of the Kingdom of Sicily	An Italian tricolour with a trinacria in the center.
	1848–1849	Flag of the Republic of San Marco	An Italian tricolour with a white canton bearing the Lion of Saint Mark.
	1848–1849	Flag of the Free Cities of Menton and Roquebrune	An Italian tricolour with two hands clasping and with the inscription "Menton et Roquebrun ville libre".
	1848–1849	Flag of the Grand Duchy of Tuscany	An Italian tricolour with the tuscan arms
	1848–1851	Flag of the Kingdom of Sardinia	An Italian tricolour with House of Savoy shield in the middle.
	1849	War flag of the Roman Republic; The state flag had no letters.	An Italian tricolour with two "R"s (Repubblica Romana) in the center.
	1859–1860	Flag of the United Provinces of Central Italy	An Italian tricolour with Savoy shield and Royal crown in the middle simplfied.
	1860–1861	Flag of the Kingdom of the Two Sicilies	An Italian tricolour with the arms of the King of the Two Sicilies in the center.
	1860–1861	War flag of the Regio Esercito	A square Italian tricolour with Savoy shield and simplified Royal crown in the middle.
	1861–1946	Civil flag of the Kingdom of Sardinia from 1848 to 1861 and from 1861 of the Kingdom of Italy	An Italian tricolour with House of Savoy shield in the middle.
	1861–1946	State flag of the Kingdom of Sardinia from 1851 to 1861 and from 1861 of the Kingdom of Italy and the Naval ensign of the Regia Marina	An Italian tricolour with Savoy shield and Royal crown in the middle.
	1879–1900	Naval jack of the Regia Marina	A square Savoy shield with blue border.
	1900–1947	Naval jack of the Regia Marina	A rectangular Savoy shield with blue border.
	1880–1946	Royal standard of the King of Italy	A blue flag with an eagle with crown and four crown at corners.
	1880–1946	Royal standard of the Prince of Piedmont	A blue flag with an eagle with crown in the middle and four crown at corners.
	1927–1943	Standard of the Head of Government and Duce of Fascism	A blue flag with a yellow line and a yellow fasces in the middle.
	1927–1943	Standard of a State Minister	A white flag with a blue line and a blue fasces in the middle.
	1927–1943	Standard of a State Subsecretary	A white flag with a blue fasces in the middle.
	1927–1943	Standard of the Minister of the Regia Marina	A blue flag with a yellow line and a yellow anchor dominated by a yellow crown in the middle.
	1927–1943	Standard of the Minister of the Air Force	A blue flag with a red line and a red eagle dominated by a red crown in the middle.
	1938–1941	Standard of the Viceroy of Italian East Africa	A white flag with blue border, with the Savoy shield in the middle and four fasces at corners.
	1936–1945	Flag of the Colonna Italiana	A tricolour flag with a red dagger and the red letters "G" and "L".
	1939–1943	Standard of the Lieutenant General of Albania	A white flag with blue border and a red line, with fasces dominated by a crown in the middle.
	1943–1945	Flag of the Italian Social Republic	An Italian tricolour.
	1943–1945	War flag of the Italian Social Republic	An Italian tricolour with dark-grey eagle clutching a fasces in the center.
	1943–1945	Flag of the National Liberation Committee	An Italian tricolour with a star inside which is the word "CLN".
	1943–1945	Flag of the Tuscan Liberation Committee	
	1943–1945	Flag of the Brigate Garibaldi	An Italian tricolour with a red star in the center.

=== Italian Republic ===
Flag	Date	Use	Description
	1945–1992	Flag of the Italian ethnic minority in Yugoslavia	An Italian tricolour with a red star in the center.
	1992–	Flag of Italians of Croatia	An Italian tricolour.
	1946–2003	Flag of Italy	An Italian tricolour.
	2003–2006	Flag of Italy	An Italian tricolour.
	2006–	Flag of Italy	An Italian tricolour.

== Regional flags ==
=== Official regional flags ===
==== Ordinary regions ====
Flag	Year of adoption	Use
	1999 (modified in 2023)	Flag of Abruzzo
	2001 (modified in 2011)	Flag of Apulia
	1995	Flag of Basilicata
	1995	Flag of Calabria
		Flag of Campania
	1995	Flag of Emilia-Romagna
		Flag of Lazio
	1997	Flag of Liguria
	1975	Flag of Lombardy
	1995	Flag of Marche
		Flag of Molise
	1995	Flag of Piedmont
	1995	Flag of Tuscany
	2004	Flag of Umbria
	1975 (modified in 1999)	Flag of Veneto

==== Autonomous regions ====
Flag	Year of adoption	Use
	2006	Flag of Aosta Valley
	2001	Flag of Friuli-Venezia Giulia
	1950 (modified in 1999)	Flag of Sardinia
	2000	Flag of Sicily
	1995	Flag of Trentino-Alto Adige/Südtirol

==== Historical regional flags ====
Flag	Date	Use
	1999–2023	Flag of Abruzzo
	1995	Flag of Lazio
	~1980	Flag of Molise
	pre–1999	Flag of Sardinia
	1995	Flag of Sardinia
	1995–2000	Flag of Sicily
	pre–1995	Flag of Tuscany
	1975–1999	Flag of Veneto

=== Flags of historical and cultural regions ===
Flag	Use
	Flag of Friuli
	Flag of Montferrat
	Flag of Elba
	Flag of the Sette Comuni of Asiago Plateau
	Flag of Occitan Valleys

=== Proposed regional flags ===
Flag	Use
	Proposed flag for Aosta Valley by Lega Nord
	Proposed flag for Basilicata
	Proposed flag for Calabria (2024)
	Proposed flag for Campania (2021)
	Proposed flag for Carnia
	Proposed flag for Emilia (1990) by Lega Nord
	Proposed flag for Emilia presented in Quaderni Padani n°46
	Proposed flag for Emilia (2019)
	Proposed flag for Friuli by Lega Nord
	Proposed flag for Liguria by Lega Nord
	Proposed flag for Insubria
	Proposed flag for Lombardy (1990)
	Proposed flag for Lombardy (2011)
	Proposed flag for Lombardy (2015)
	Proposed flag for Lombardy (2015)
	Proposed flag for Lucania
	Proposed flag for Lunezia by Associazione Lunezia
	Proposed flag for Marche
	Proposed flag for Marche by Lega Nord
	Proposed flag for Romagna by Lega Nord - Romagna
	Proposed flag for Romagna (Variant) Lega Nord - Romagna
	Proposed flag for Romagna by Movement for the Autonomy of Romagna
	Proposed flag for Salento
	Proposed flag for Trentino by Lega Nord
	Proposed flag for Umbria
	Proposed flag for Umbria by Lega Nord
	Proposed flag for Venezia Giulia

== Political flags ==
Flag	Date	Party	Description
current
	2017–present	Frontal Action	
	2017–present	Power to the People	
	2016–present	Italian Communist Party	
	2014–2018	Us with Salvini	
	2013–present	Forza Italia	
	2009–present	Five Star Movement	
	2007–present	Democratic Party	
	2020–present	New Force	
	2006–2020	New Force	
	1997–2000	New Force	
	2009–present	Communist Party	
	2006–present	Students' Block	
	1996–present	Lega Sud Ausonia	
	1995–present	Tricolour Flame	
	1992–present	CARC Party	
	1991–present	Communist Refoundation Party	
	1991–present	Lega Nord	
	1991–present	Lega Vallée d'Aoste	
	1991–present	Lega Liguria	
	1991–present	Lega Lombarda	
	1991–present	Lega Piemonte	
	1991–present	Lega Umbria	
	1977–present	Italian Marxist–Leninist Party	
former
	2003–present (Note: Currently a neo-fascist movement with the official title "CasaPound Italia")	CasaPound	
	2002–2000	Democracy is Freedom – The Daisy	
	1998–2014	Party of Italian Communists	
	1998–2007	Democrats of the Left	
	1946–1995	Italian Social Movement	
	1943–1994	Christian Democracy	
	1946–1951	Movement for the Independence of Sicily	Still used in Sicilian separatism
	1943–1946	Movement for the Independence of Sicily	
	1923–1943	National Fascist Party	
	1919–1923	National Fascist Party	
	1926–1991	Italian Communist Party	
	1951–1991	Italian Communist Party	
	early 19th century	Carbonari	
other
	2016–present	Associazione Ricreativa e Culturale Italiana	
Link to file	2007–present	Banner used in protests helmed by South Tyrolean Freedom.	
	1996–present	Flag of Padanian nationalism	
	1990–2007	Youth Left	
	1970–1988; 1990s–2000s	Red Brigades	
	1960–1976	National Vanguard	
	1956–1973	Ordine Nuovo	
	1944–present	War flag of the Italian Social Republic, currently popular fascist flag	
	1943–1944	Volunteers of Freedom Corps	
	1929–1945	Giustizia e Libertà	
	1923–1943	Voluntary Militia for National Security, paramilitary wing of the National Fascist Party.	
	1921–1924	Arditi del Popolo	
	1921–1924	Arditi del Popolo, section Civitavecchia.	

== Ethnic groups flags ==
Flag	Date	Company	Description
	1920–present	Flag of Ladins	

== House flags ==
Flag	Date	Company	Description
current
	1947–present	Grimaldi Group	
	1921–present	Messina Line	
former
	1932–2002	Italian Line	
	1937–1988	Sitmar Cruises	
	1926–1955	Società Ricuperi Marittimi	
