= Flag of Emilia-Romagna =

- Proportion: 2:3
- Adopted: 1995 (de facto)
- Design: The emblem of the region superimposed upon a field of white, with a red bar and the words "Regione Emilia-Romagna" below

The flag of Emilia-Romagna is one of the official symbols of the region of Emilia-Romagna, Italy. The flag shows the emblem adopted in 1989 in the variant with green writing and red bar on a white background.

Currently the banner does not enjoy official legislative status, but is currently used in ceremonial context since the end of the 90s: for November 4, 1995, the national day of the Armed Forces, the President of the Republic Oscar Luigi Scalfaro wanted to exhibit in a Sala del Quirinale the flags of all Italian regions, but many of them, including Emilia-Romagna, did not have specific laws regarding the adoption of a banner. Therefore, several provisional versions were developed (one for each region that did not have one) to respond to the request of the Head of State.

In this case the flag was outlined by overlapping the official emblem on a simple white background in the shape of a rectangle of proportions 2:3 (height x base). The figure, placed symmetrically in the center of the element, occupies a total of 3/5 of the height of the entire field and the colors, as well as the graphics, correspond to the indications and standards dictated by the coordinated image manual. The banner, at first used exclusively on rare occasions, has progressively spread over time and today is displayed by various public administrations and institutions (mostly municipalities and provinces) within the Emilia-Romagna territory as well as in the official headquarters of the region in Bologna and in the buildings occupied by the Legislative Assembly and the council.

== Symbolism ==
The flag has been in unofficial use since 1995. The emblem represents the geographical profile of the region. According to the designer, the curved line represents the Po and nature, while the straight line represents the road and the work of man. The green colour represents that of the Po Valley.

== History ==
=== Duchy of Ferrara and Duchy of Modena and Reggio ===
The Duchy of Modena and Reggio was a small northwestern Italian state that existed from 1452 to 1859, with a break during the Napoleonic Wars (1796–1814) when Emperor Napoleon I reorganized the states and republics of renaissance-era Italy, then under the domination of his French Empire. It was ruled since its establishment by the noble House of Este, and since 1814 by the Austria-Este branch of the family.

==== First flag ====
before 1830

The Duchy's flag in use from the beginning of the state. Abolished during the Napoleonic period (1796-1814), it returned to waving for about fifteen years before being replaced and during this period also served as a trade flag for ships navigated through the port of the Principality of Massa. The coat of arms of House of Este, a silver eagle on a blue background, dating to c. 1168, was displayed on the flags from about 1239.

==== Second flag ====
1830-1859

Civil flag and Civil ensign

The state flag was adopted by Francesco IV Habsburg-Este in January 1830 and lasted until 11 June 1859. The Austrian colours, red and white, were combined with the colours of Este, white and blue. In the centre, a small ducal coat of arms with the coats of arms of the House of Austria-Este. At the same time, there was also a maritime trade flag (after the successful incorporation of Massa-Carrara in 1829, the principality had an outlet to the sea), which differed from the state by the lack of a ducal coat of arms.

=== Duchy of Parma ===
The Duchy of Parma and Piacenza was an Italian state created in 1545.

==== First flag ====
before 1735

The first flag was yellow with six blue fleur-de-lis arranged in rows of three, two and one. It was the banner of arms of the House of Farnese. The beginning of the use of this flag is unknown, but it was certainly used in 1731 and during the four-year reign of Charles I of the House of Bourbon.

==== Second flag ====
1735-1748

The Austrian flag was used during the personal union with the Habsburgs' Holy Roman Empire. There is no data on any flag between 1748 and 1808. During the Napoleonic Wars, there was a department Taro in these lands.

==== Third flag ====
1815-1847

Civil Ensign

A new flag was used under the reign of Marie Louise. It was vertical bicolour of red and white. Apart from that at the beginning of her reign blue and white cockades were used. In the same period, a civil ensign was used for river navigation. The coat of arms in the center, in a peculiar horizontal position, belonged to Marie Louise. The proportion of the cloth was perhaps 5/7 (in this case the chess pieces on the large edge are perfect squares).

==== Fourth flag ====
1848-1849

State flag, the existence of which is not fully established. The decree of 29 January 1848 establishes a yellow and blue cockade and it can be assumed that the same colours were used on the flag with horizontal stripes. The colours were as in the time of the Farnese whose shield the Bourbons-Parma had placed in their coat of arms.

==== Fifth flag ====
1850-1851

The national flag from September 1850 to 15 August 1851. The flag was raised daily because it was flown on weekdays, and on holidays it was replaced with the prince's banner. It served as a model for another, with identical use, which was distinguished by the lack of a red border and the number of gyronnys (12 instead of 8).

==== Sixth flag ====
1851-1859

Civil Ensign of the Duchy of Parma

The national flag defined by the decree of Charles III of 15 August 1851 and lasted until the annexation of the Duchy to United Provinces of Central Italy on 9 June 1859. The red frame was probably added because, in addition to the local colors (yellow and blue), also those of the Spanish Bourbons (yellow and red). In the same period, a trade flag was adopted for river navigation: a white fabric with the state flag of the canton.

=== Cispadane Republic ===
1796–1797

The Cispadane Republic was a short-lived client republic, founded in 1796 with the protection of the French army, led by Napoleon Bonaparte. In the following year, it was merged with the Transpadane Republic (formerly the Duchy of Milan until 1796) to form the Cisalpine Republic. The Cispadane Republic was the first Italian sovereign State to adopt the Italian tricolour as flag.

=== Republic of Rose Island ===
1968

another version

The Republic of Rose Island was a short-lived micronation on a man-made platform in the Adriatic Sea, 11 kilometres (6.8 mi) off the coast of the province of Rimini. It was built by the Italian engineer Giorgio Rosa, who made himself its president and declared it an independent state on 1 May 1968. Rose Island had its own government, currency, post office, and commercial establishments, and the official language was Esperanto. However, it was never formally recognized as a sovereign state by any country of the world. Viewed by the Italian government as a ploy by Rosa to raise money from tourists while avoiding national taxation, Rose Island was occupied by the Italian police forces on 26 June 1968, subject to naval blockade, and eventually demolished in February 1969. Rose Island's flag was orange, with a white shield in the center bearing three red roses with green leaves and stems.

== Proposed flags for Emilia ==
Lega Nord Proposal

Proposal featured in "Quaderni Padani" issue n°46

Proposed flag of Emilia. Combines the red on white cross (used by Bologna and Reggio Emilia) together with the blue on gold cross (used by Parma and Modena)

== Proposed flags for Romagna ==
Lega Nord 1st proposal

Lega Nord 2nd proposal

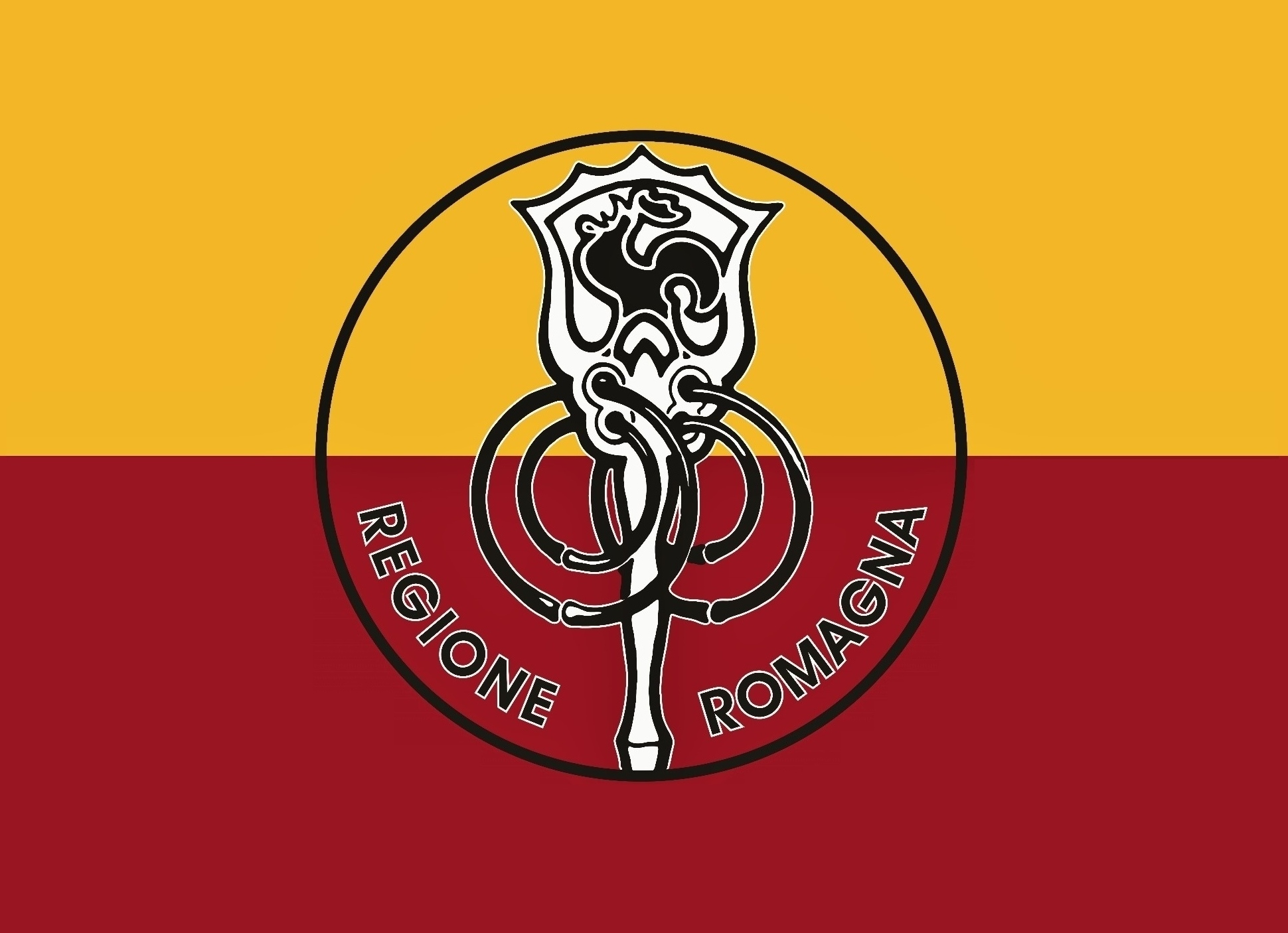
Movement for the Autonomy of Romagna party flag, by Ettore Nadiani

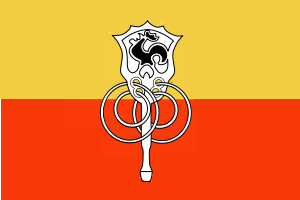
version without name and borders

Movement for the Autonomy of Romagna proposal

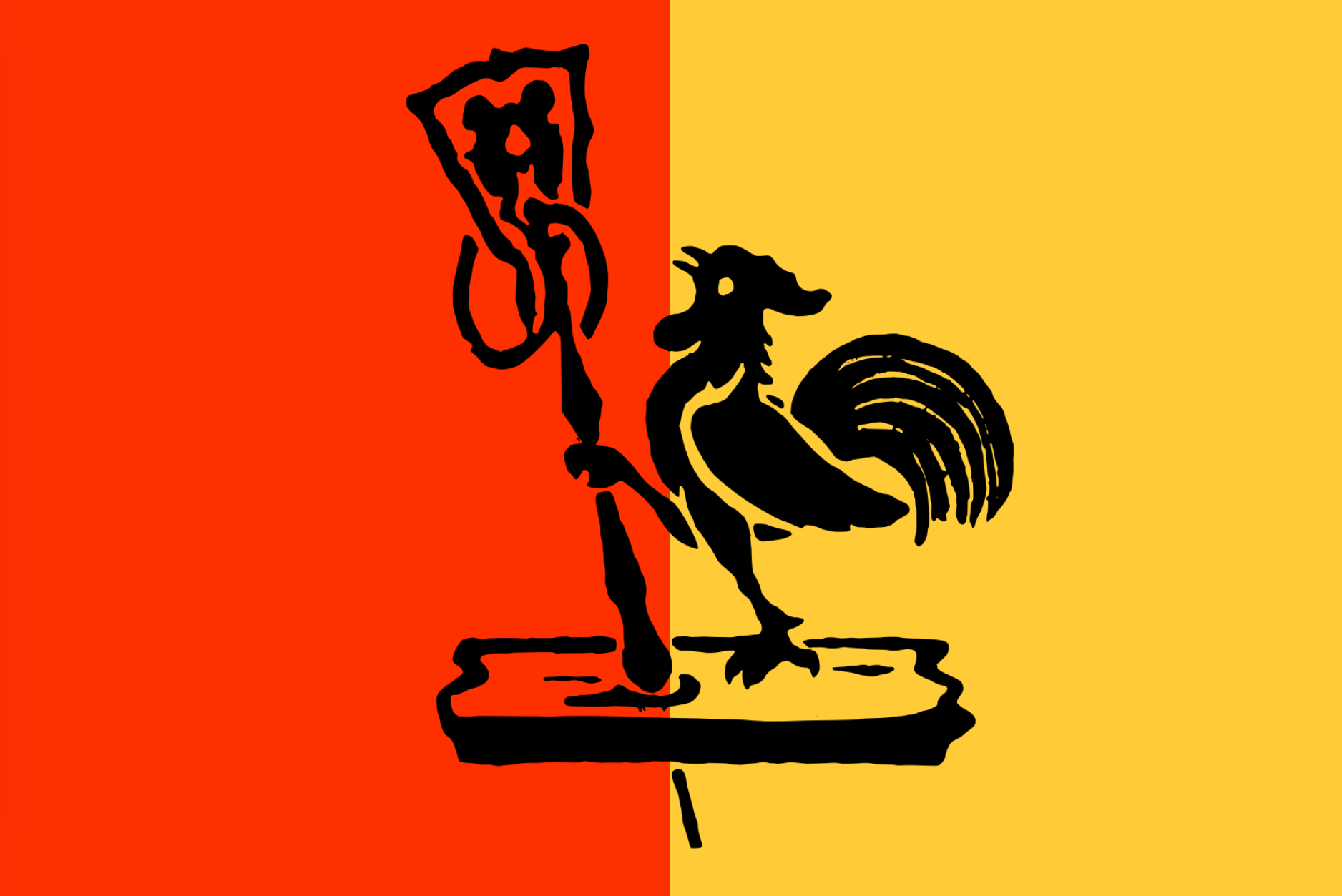
version with vertical bands
