= List of Italian regions by GRDP per capita =

This article is about the gross regional domestic product (GRDP) per capita of Italian regions in nominal values. Values are shown in EUR€. For easy comparison, all the GRDP figures are converted into US$ according to annual average exchange rates. (Note: Euro figures are converted to USD rates as of 31 December of a given year.) All values are rounded to the nearest hundred.

== 2022 ==
List of Italian regions by nominal GRDP per capita
Region/Province	Rank	GRDP per capita (EUR€)	GRDP per capita (US$)
Italy	—	33,000	36,400
Trentino-Alto Adige/Südtirol	1	49,350	54,150
Lombardy	2	44,400	49,000
Aosta Valley	3	43,700	48,200
Emilia-Romagna	4	40,000	44,150
Lazio	5	37,200	41,050
Veneto	6	37,200	41,050
Friuli-Venezia Giulia	7	36,000	39,700
Liguria	8	35,800	39,500
Tuscany	9	35,100	38,700
Piedmont	10	34,400	38,000
Marche	11	30,800	34,000
Umbria	12	28 200	31,100
Basilicata	13	27,800	30,700
Abruzzo	14	27,000	29,800
Sardinia	15	23,700	26,150
Molise	16	22,500	24,800
Apulia	17	21,600	23,800
Campania	18	21,200	23,400
Sicily	19	20,100	22,200
Calabria	20	19,400	21,400

== 2020 ==
List of Italian regions by nominal GRP per capita
Region/Province	Rank	GRDP per capita (EUR€)	GRDP per capita (US$)
Italy	—	29,200	34,500
South Tyrol	1	47,100	55,600
Aosta Valley	2	38,900	45,900
Lombardy	3	38,600	45,600
Trentino	4	38,000	44,900
Emilia-Romagna	5	36,200	42,800
Lazio	6	33,600	39,700
Veneto	7	33,200	39,200
Liguria	8	32,100	37,900
Piedmont	9	31,500	37,200
Tuscany	9	31,500	37,200
Friuli-Venezia Giulia	11	31,300	37,000
Marche	12	28,300	33,400
Abruzzo	13	25,800	30,500
Umbria	14	25,400	30,000
Basilicata	15	22,200	26,200
Sardinia	16	21,200	25,000
Molise	17	20,900	24,700
Apulia	18	19,000	22,400
Campania	19	18,600	22,000
Sicily	20	17,800	21,000
Calabria	21	16,000	19,100

== 2017 ==
List of Italian regions by nominal GRP per capita
Region/Province	Rank	GRDP per capita (EUR€)	GRDP per capita (US$)
Italy	—	28,500	32,200
South Tyrol	1	42,300	47,800
Lombardy	2	38,000	42,900
Trentino	3	36,100	40,800
Emilia-Romagna	4	35,300	39,900
Aosta Valley	5	35,200	39,800
Veneto	6	33,100	37,400
Lazio	7	32,700	37,000
Liguria	8	31,600	35,700
Friuli-Venezia Giulia	9	30,900	34,900
Tuscany	10	30,400	34,300
Piedmont	11	30,300	34,200
Marche	12	26,800	30,300
Abruzzo	13	24,700	27,900
Umbria	14	24,500	27,700
Basilicata	15	21,100	23,800
Sardinia	16	20,600	23,300
Molise	17	19,800	22,400
Apulia	18	18,400	20,800
Campania	19	18,200	20,600
Sicily	20	17,500	19,800
Calabria	21	17,200	19,400

== 2016 ==
List of Italian regions by nominal GRP per capita
Region/Province	Rank	GRDP per capita (EUR€)	GRDP per capita (US$)
Italy	—	27,700	30,700
South Tyrol	1	42,600	47,100
Lombardy	2	36,600	40,500
Trentino	3	35,000	38,700
Aosta Valley	4	34,900	38,600
Emilia-Romagna	5	34,600	38,300
Veneto	6	31,700	35,100
Lazio	7	31,600	35,000
Liguria	8	30,800	34,100
Friuli-Venezia Giulia	9	30,300	33,500
Tuscany	10	30,000	33,200
Piedmont	11	29,400	32,500
Marche	12	26,600	29,400
Abruzzo	13	24,100	26,700
Umbria	14	24,000	26,600
Basilicata	15	20,600	22,800
Sardinia	16	20,300	22,500
Molise	17	20,000	22,100
Campania	18	18,300	20,300
Apulia	19	17,800	19,700
Sicily	20	17,200	19,000
Calabria	21	16,800	18,600

== See also ==
- List of Italian regions by GDP
- List of Italian regions by Human Development Index
