= List of Italian regions by GDP =

This article lists Italian regions and autonomous provinces (NUTS 2) by gross domestic product (GDP).

== Gross domestic product by region ==
This table reports the nominal GDP of the twenty regions of Italy from 2000 to 2019, expressed in billions of euro.

List of Italian regions by GDP (billions of euro)
| | Region | 2000 | 2010 | 2019 | 2010-2019 % GDP change | % of nationwide 2019 GDP |
|---|---|---|---|---|---|---|
| 1 | Lombardy | 259.86 | 349.55 | 468.77 | ▲12.34 | 22.28 |
| 2 | Lazio | 138.11 | 187.67 | 200.84 | ▲6.55 | 11.22 |
| 3 | Veneto | 111.46 | 143.25 | 164.86 | ▲13.10 | 9.21 |
| 4 | Emilia-Romagna | 106.15 | 137.95 | 163.75 | ▲15.75 | 9.15 |
| 5 | Piedmont | 99.69 | 124.55 | 137.78 | ▲9.60 | 7.70 |
| 6 | Tuscany | 80.68 | 105.27 | 118.72 | ▲11.32 | 6.63 |
| 7 | Campania | 83.02 | 102.91 | 109.63 | ▲6.12 | 6.13 |
| 8 | Sicily | 69.28 | 88.25 | 89.36 | ▲1.24 | 4.99 |
| 9 | Apulia | 57.74 | 70.18 | 77.47 | ▲9.41 | 4.33 |
| 10 | Liguria | 36.57 | 46.09 | 49.74 | ▲7.33 | 2.78 |
| 11 | Trentino-Alto Adige | 28.27 | 38.38 | 46.55 | ▲21 | 2.60 |
| 12 | Marche | 30.13 | 39.43 | 42.39 | ▲6.98 | 2.37 |
| 13 | Friuli-Venezia Giulia | 27.79 | 35.68 | 38.77 | ▲7.97 | 2.17 |
| 14 | Sardinia | 25.01 | 33.32 | 35.25 | ▲5.47 | 1.97 |
| 15 | Calabria | 26.26 | 33.27 | 33.61 | ▲1.01 | 1.88 |
| 16 | Abruzzo | 24.10 | 30.81 | 33.13 | ▲7.00 | 1.85 |
| 17 | Umbria | 17.71 | 22.18 | 23.26 | ▲4.64 | 1.30 |
| 18 | Basilicata | 9.82 | 11.19 | 13.09 | ▲14.51 | 0.73 |
| 19 | Molise | 5.42 | 6.68 | 6.49 | ▼2.84 | 0.36 |
| 20 | Aosta Valley | 3.44 | 4.73 | 4.86 | ▲2.67 | 0.27 |
| — | Italy | 1,241.51 | 1,611.27 | 1,789.74 | ▲9.97 | 100.00 |

=== Per capita GDP by region ===
Italian regions by GDP per capita (in euros, at current market prices)
| Rank | Region | 2023 | % of nationwide average |
|---|---|---|---|
| 1 | South Tyrol | 59,774 | 165.68 |
| 2 | Lombardy | 49,041 | 135.93 |
| 3 | Trentino | 46,325 | 128.40 |
| 4 | Aosta Valley | 46,323 | 128.40 |
| 5 | Emilia-Romagna | 43,340 | 120.13 |
| 6 | Lazio | 41,724 | 115.65 |
| 7 | Veneto | 40,639 | 112.64 |
| 8 | Liguria | 37,990 | 105.30 |
| 9 | Friuli-Venezia Giulia | 37,685 | 104.45 |
| 10 | Tuscany | 37,642 | 104.34 |
| 11 | Piedmont | 36,686 | 101.68 |
| 12 | Marche | 33,169 | 91.94 |
| 13 | Abruzzo | 31,019 | 85.98 |
| 14 | Umbria | 30,523 | 84.60 |
| 15 | Basilicata | 27,464 | 76.12 |
| 16 | Molise | 26,732 | 74.10 |
| 17 | Sardinia | 26,315 | 72.94 |
| 18 | Apulia | 23,499 | 65.13 |
| 19 | Campania | 23,255 | 64.45 |
| 20 | Sicily | 22,923 | 63.54 |
| 21 | Calabria | 21,142 | 58.60 |
| — | Italy | 36,078 | 100.00 |

== Provincial GDP ==
All provinces and metropolitan cities of Italy by GDP and GDP per capita in 2021.

| Province | Region | 2021 GDP (in mil. of Euro) | 2021 GDP (mil. of US$ PPP) | 2021 GDP per capita (in Euro) | 2021 GDP per capita (in US$ PPP) |
|---|---|---|---|---|---|
| Metropolitan City of Turin | Piedmont | 75,854 | 122,854 | 34,264 | 55,495 |
| Vercelli | Piedmont | 5,041 | 8,164 | 30,305 | 49,083 |
| Biella | Piedmont | 4,779 | 7,740 | 28,050 | 45,430 |
| Verbano-Cusio-Ossola | Piedmont | 3,886 | 6,294 | 25,140 | 40,717 |
| Novara | Piedmont | 11,693 | 18,938 | 32,263 | 52,254 |
| Cuneo | Piedmont | 19,862 | 32,169 | 34,188 | 55,371 |
| Asti | Piedmont | 5,606 | 9,080 | 26,844 | 43,477 |
| Alessandria | Piedmont | 12,228 | 19,804 | 29,945 | 48,500 |
| Aosta Valley | Aosta Valley | 4,777 | 7,737 | 38,612 | 62,537 |
| Imperia | Liguria | 5,231 | 8,472 | 25,032 | 40,542 |
| Savona | Liguria | 7,958 | 12,888 | 29,593 | 47,930 |
| Metropolitan City of Genoa | Liguria | 29,039 | 47,032 | 35,392 | 57,321 |
| La Spezia | Liguria | 7,190 | 11,644 | 33,362 | 54,034 |
| Varese | Lombardy | 26,852 | 43,490 | 30,552 | 49,483 |
| Como | Lombardy | 17,584 | 28,480 | 29,519 | 47,810 |
| Lecco | Lombardy | 11,055 | 17,905 | 33,198 | 53,768 |
| Sondrio | Lombardy | 5,388 | 8,726 | 30,134 | 48,806 |
| Bergamo | Lombardy | 39,562 | 64,076 | 35,859 | 58,078 |
| Brescia | Lombardy | 45,428 | 73,577 | 36,214 | 58,653 |
| Pavia | Lombardy | 14,195 | 22,990 | 26,525 | 42,960 |
| Lodi | Lombardy | 6,562 | 10,628 | 28,864 | 46,748 |
| Cremona | Lombardy | 12,280 | 19,889 | 34,891 | 56,510 |
| Mantua | Lombardy | 13,420 | 21,736 | 33,114 | 53,632 |
| Metropolitan City of Milan | Lombardy | 193,373 | 313,191 | 59,901 | 97,017 |
| Monza and Brianza | Lombardy | 28,501 | 46,160 | 32,750 | 53,042 |
| L'Aquila | Abruzzo | 7,608 | 12,321 | 26,244 | 42,505 |
| Teramo | Abruzzo | 7,671 | 12,425 | 25,539 | 41,363 |
| Pescara | Abruzzo | 8,061 | 13,056 | 25,692 | 41,612 |
| Chieti | Abruzzo | 10,111 | 16,376 | 27,000 | 43,730 |
| Isernia | Molise | 1,725 | 2,793 | 21,293 | 34,486 |
| Campobasso | Molise | 4,925 | 7,976 | 23,205 | 37,583 |
| Caserta | Campania | 16,445 | 26,634 | 18,202 | 29,480 |
| Benevento | Campania | 4,892 | 7,923 | 18,399 | 29,799 |
| Metropolitan City of Naples | Campania | 61,059 | 98,892 | 20,438 | 33,101 |
| Avellino | Campania | 7,741 | 12,538 | 19,248 | 31,174 |
| Salerno | Campania | 21,385 | 34,635 | 20,075 | 32,514 |
| Taranto | Apulia | 11,491 | 18,611 | 20,486 | 33,179 |
| Brindisi | Apulia | 7,327 | 11,867 | 19,201 | 31,098 |
| Lecce | Apulia | 14,272 | 23,116 | 18,397 | 29,797 |
| Foggia | Apulia | 11,350 | 18,382 | 18,894 | 30,601 |
| Metropolitan City of Bari | Apulia | 28,702 | 46,486 | 23,364 | 37,840 |
| Barletta-Andria-Trani | Apulia | 6,504 | 10,534 | 17,078 | 27,660 |
| Potenza | Basilicata | 9,206 | 14 910 | 26,224 | 42,473 |
| Matera | Basilicata | 4,087 | 6,620 | 21,278 | 34,462 |
| Cosenza | Calabria | 11,139 | 18,041 | 16,494 | 26,714 |
| Crotone | Calabria | 3,080 | 4,988 | 18,802 | 30,452 |
| Catanzaro | Calabria | 7,213 | 11,683 | 20,965 | 33,956 |
| Vibo Valentia | Calabria | 2,542 | 4,116 | 16,734 | 27,103 |
| Reggio Calabria | Calabria | 9,764 | 15,814 | 18,671 | 30,239 |
| Trapani | Sicily | 7,088 | 11,480 | 16,968 | 27,481 |
| Metropolitan City of Palermo | Sicily | 24,380 | 39,486 | 20,167 | 32,663 |
| Metropolitan City of Messina | Sicily | 11,585 | 18,764 | 19,193 | 31,086 |
| Agrigento | Sicily | 6,751 | 10,934 | 16,227 | 26,281 |
| Caltanissetta | Sicily | 4,473 | 7,245 | 17,703 | 28,672 |
| Enna | Sicily | 2,628 | 4,256 | 17,703 | 27,072 |
| Metropolitan City of Catania | Sicily | 21,020 | 34,044 | 19,539 | 31,646 |
| Ragusa | Sicily | 6,006 | 9,727 | 19,035 | 30,829 |
| Syracuse | Sicily | 8,005 | 12,965 | 20,739 | 33,589 |
| Sassari | Sardinia | 10,845 | 17,565 | 22,763 | 36,867 |
| Nuoro | Sardinia | 4,109 | 6,655 | 20,447 | 33,116 |
| Metropolitan City of Cagliari | Sardinia | 12,059 | 19,530 | 28,603 | 46,326 |
| Oristano | Sardinia | 3,024 | 4,898 | 19,889 | 32,212 |
| Sud Sardegna | Sardinia | 5,648 | 9,147 | 16,723 | 27,085 |
| Alto Adige | Trentino-Alto Adige | 25,931 | 41,998 | 48,582 | 78,684 |
| Trentino | Trentino-Alto Adige | 21,645 | 35,056 | 39,968 | 64,732 |
| Verona | Veneto | 32,499 | 52,636 | 35,099 | 56,847 |
| Vicenza | Veneto | 31,426 | 50,898 | 36,818 | 59,631 |
| Belluno | Veneto | 6,729 | 10,898 | 33,780 | 54,711 |
| Treviso | Veneto | 30,847 | 49,960 | 35,087 | 56,828 |
| Metropolitan City of Venice | Veneto | 26,470 | 42,872 | 31,504 | 51,024 |
| Padua | Veneto | 33,461 | 54,195 | 35,945 | 58,217 |
| Rovigo | Veneto | 6,330 | 10,252 | 27,541 | 44,606 |
| Pordenone | Friuli-Venezia Giulia | 10,213 | 16,541 | 32,940 | 53,349 |
| Udine | Friuli-Venezia Giulia | 17,244 | 27,928 | 33,175 | 53,730 |
| Gorizia | Friuli-Venezia Giulia | 4,115 | 6,664 | 29,712 | 48,122 |
| Trieste | Friuli-Venezia Giulia | 8,913 | 14,435 | 38,791 | 62,827 |
| Piacenza | Emilia-Romagna | 10,020 | 16,229 | 35,334 | 57,227 |
| Parma | Emilia-Romagna | 19,032 | 30,825 | 42,363 | 68,612 |
| Reggio Emilia | Emilia-Romagna | 20,311 | 32,896 | 38,588 | 62,498 |
| Modena | Emilia-Romagna | 29,072 | 47,085 | 41,370 | 67,004 |
| Metropolitan City of Bologna | Emilia-Romagna | 43,129 | 69,852 | 42,566 | 68,941 |
| Ferrara | Emilia-Romagna | 9,540 | 15,452 | 27,993 | 45,337 |
| Ravenna | Emilia-Romagna | 12,834 | 20,786 | 33,237 | 53,831 |
| Forlì-Cesena | Emilia-Romagna | 13,605 | 22,036 | 34,710 | 56,217 |
| Rimini | Emilia-Romagna | 10,389 | 16,825 | 30,729 | 49,769 |
| Massa and Carrara | Tuscany | 4,928 | 7,982 | 26,053 | 42,196 |
| Lucca | Tuscany | 11,414 | 18,487 | 29,786 | 48,242 |
| Pistoia | Tuscany | 7,652 | 12,394 | 26,402 | 42,762 |
| Metropolitan City of Florence | Tuscany | 38,838 | 62,903 | 39,118 | 63,356 |
| Prato | Tuscany | 8,238 | 13,343 | 31,479 | 50,984 |
| Livorno | Tuscany | 9,318 | 15,092 | 28,398 | 45,993 |
| Pisa | Tuscany | 13,920 | 22,545 | 33,341 | 54,000 |
| Arezzo | Tuscany | 10,174 | 16,478 | 30,307 | 49,085 |
| Siena | Tuscany | 8,352 | 13,528 | 31,817 | 51,532 |
| Grosseto | Tuscany | 5,650 | 9,151 | 25,985 | 42,086 |
| Perugia | Umbria | 17,527 | 28,387 | 27,259 | 44,149 |
| Terni | Umbria | 5,620 | 9,103 | 25,648 | 41,540 |
| Pesaro and Urbino | Marche | 10,394 | 16,834 | 29,565 | 47,884 |
| Ancona | Marche | 14,656 | 23,737 | 31,651 | 51,263 |
| Macerata | Marche | 8,586 | 13,906 | 28,041 | 45,415 |
| Ascoli Piceno | Marche | 5,506 | 8,918 | 27,138 | 43,953 |
| Fermo | Marche | 4,158 | 6,734 | 24,601 | 39,844 |
| Viterbo | Lazio | 6,893 | 11,164 | 22,323 | 36,155 |
| Rieti | Lazio | 3,441 | 5,573 | 22,752 | 36,850 |
| Metropolitan City of Rome | Lazio | 163,462 | 264,746 | 38,697 | 62,674 |
| Latina | Lazio | 13,619 | 22,058 | 24,027 | 38,915 |
| Frosinone | Lazio | 11,097 | 17,973 | 23,529 | 38,108 |

== See also ==
- List of Italian regions by GRDP per capita
- List of Italian regions by Human Development Index
