= List of Italian regions by Human Development Index =

Italian regions ranked by HDI score

Map of the Italian regions by HDI in 2017. Legend: > 0.910 0.900 - 0.910 0.880 - 0.899 0.860 - 0.879 > 0.850

This is a list of 19 regions of Italy and the 2 autonomous provinces of South Tyrol and Trentino by Human Development Index as of 2023.

Rank	Region or autonomous province	HDI (2023)	Similar Country
Very high human development			
1	Trentino	0.944	United Kingdom
2	Emilia-Romagna	0.943	United Kingdom
3	Lazio	0.938	United States
3	Friuli-Venezia Giulia	0.938	United States
5	Lombardy	0.936	South Korea
6	Tuscany	0.930	Austria
7	South Tyrol	0.926	Japan
8	Marche	0.923	Malta
9	Veneto	0.922	Luxembourg
10	Liguria	0.921	France
11	Piedmont	0.920	France
12	Umbria	0.917	Spain
	Italy (average)	0.915	San Marino
13	Abruzzo	0.909	Greece
14	Aosta Valley	0.908	Greece
15	Molise	0.894	Lithuania
16	Basilicata	0.888	Latvia
17	Sardinia	0.887	Qatar
18	Apulia	0.878	Chile
19	Campania	0.876	Chile
20	Sicily	0.868	Hungary
21	Calabria	0.867	Argentina

== See also ==
- List of countries by Human Development Index
- List of Italian regions by GDP
- List of Italian regions by GRDP per capita
