= Flag of Friuli =

- Bandiere dal Friûl
- Proportion: 2:3
- Design: Pantone 300U 108U 485C Process Black U

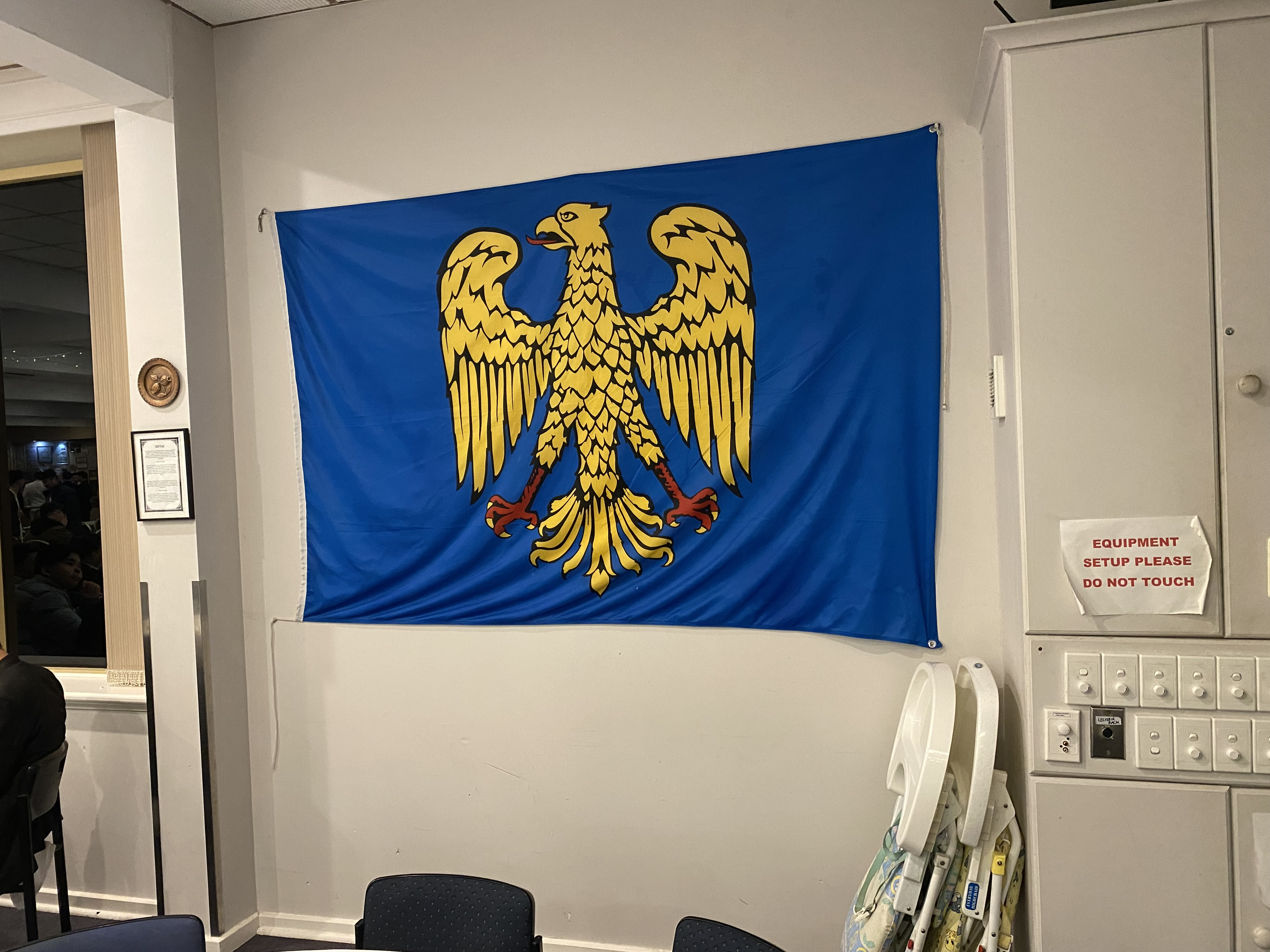
Flag of Friuli seen at a venue.

The flag of Friuli (Note: Italian: Bandiera del Friuli; Friulian: Bandiere dal Friûl) is the official standard of Friuli, a historical region in Italy. A Friuli-Venezia Giulia Autonomous Regional law (Art. 6 par. 1 bis of Regional Law no. 27 of 27 November 2001) describes the flag as "a rectangular standard featuring at its centre a golden heraldic eagle with outspread wings, head turned to the left, open beak and red claws, set in a sky blue field. The crest covers three fifths of the height of the flag, which in turn is two thirds of its length."

The Friulian flag first came to be in 1334, making it the seventh oldest flag in Europe.

== History ==
=== The origins ===
The flag of Friuli originated in "Patria del Friuli", the patriarchal state of Aquileia (also referred to as the patriarchal state of Friuli). The patriarchal state of Aquileia was a sovereign vassal state of the Holy Roman Empire and ruled from 1077 to 1420. The patriarchal state also ruled over the territories of Istria, Cadore, Carinthia, Carniola, and Styria for various periods of time.

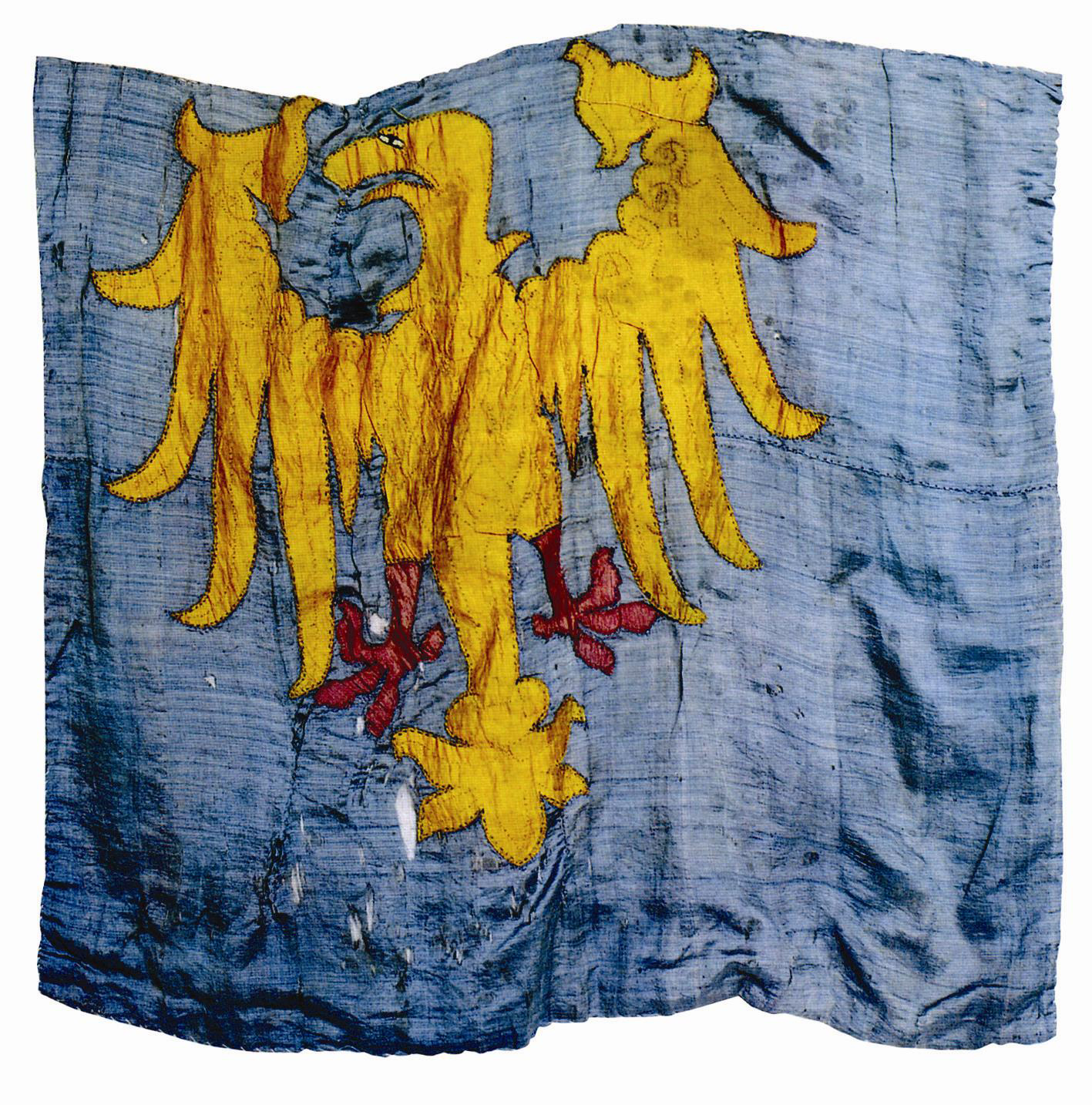
An old patriarchal standard that was part of the funerary goods of the Blessed Patriarch Bertrand (1258–1350).

The earliest and most widely recognised example of the Friulian flag can be seen at the museum of the Duomo of Udine. The flag is a 61 x 65.5 cm quadrangular piece of grey-azure (bright blue) silk cloth. A yellow bodied eagle with red claws and its head turned to the left is featured at the centre of the flag. The flag was part of the funeral goods of the patriarch Bertrand of Saint-Geniès who was the patriarch of Aquileia from 1334 until his death in 1350 when Friulian nobles conspired to brutally murder him.

Various theories have been proposed to explain why the flag depicts an eagle, but none has been proven. According to some, the crest is a reference to the origin myth of the city of Aquileia (however, it is a proven fact that the place-name "Aquileia" does not come from the "aquila" Latin noun for "eagle," but from Celtic dialects). Other theories allege that it is a reproduction of the coat of arm of patriarch Bertrand. However, as is apparent from his seal kept at Civici Musei di Udine (inv. no. 413), the family's coat of arms of the Occitan patriarch actually depicted a "shield with crossbars".

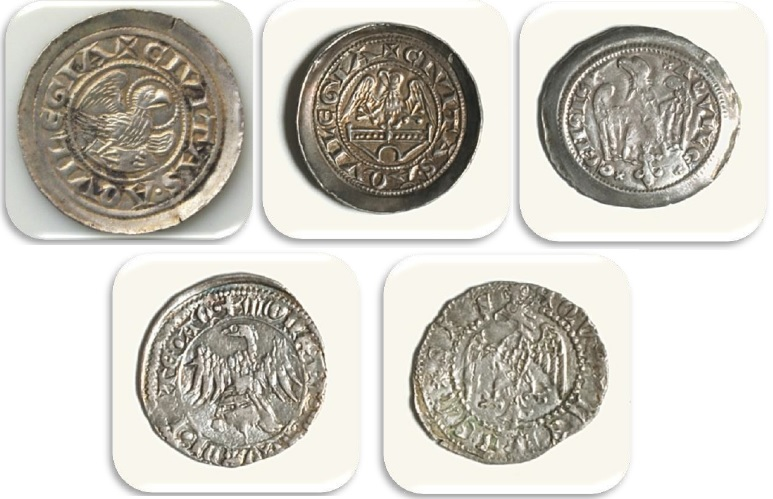
Aquileian cup-shaped coin form the patriarchal period (13th–15th century), depicting the eagle, which already was a symbol of Friuli.

In addition, there is a further theory, though dubious, suggesting that instead of an eagle the crest depicts an actual griffon. This does not appear to be plausible, as in heraldry a griffon is always depicted as a chimeric figure. Such a theory cannot be supported by the fact that the head and the collar resemble those more of a griffon, as the stylisation dates back to the Medieval times. Conclusive evidence comes from the established fact that an eagle was adopted as a symbol of the Patria del Friuli over a century before the 14th-century flag.

Indeed, the eagle symbol was tied to the state of Friuli long before its connection with the patriarch Bertrand. Confirmation of this fact can be seen in the numerous archaeological findings that trace the utilisation of the eagle to Wolfger von Erla who was patriarch of Aquileia from 1204 to 1218. An eagle similar to that of patriarch Bertrand was found on coins minted under the leadership of patriarch Berthold von Andechs-Meranien, successor of Wolfger, who ruled the patriarchal state of Friuli from 1218 to 1251. Even on the coins minted by patriarch Raimondo della Torre (ruling the Friulian state from 1273 to 1298) the similarities to the eagle of patriarch Bertrand are evident. Even today, an ancient polychrome fresco depicting the Friulian eagle is clearly visible in Udine on the façade of Palazzo Susanna di Prampero (Palazzetto Puppi) overlooking via Savorgnana.

=== The flag today ===
The Friulian flag was officially adopted and recognised on 27 November 2001 by Regional Law no. 27 of the Friuli-Venezia Giulia Autonomous Region.

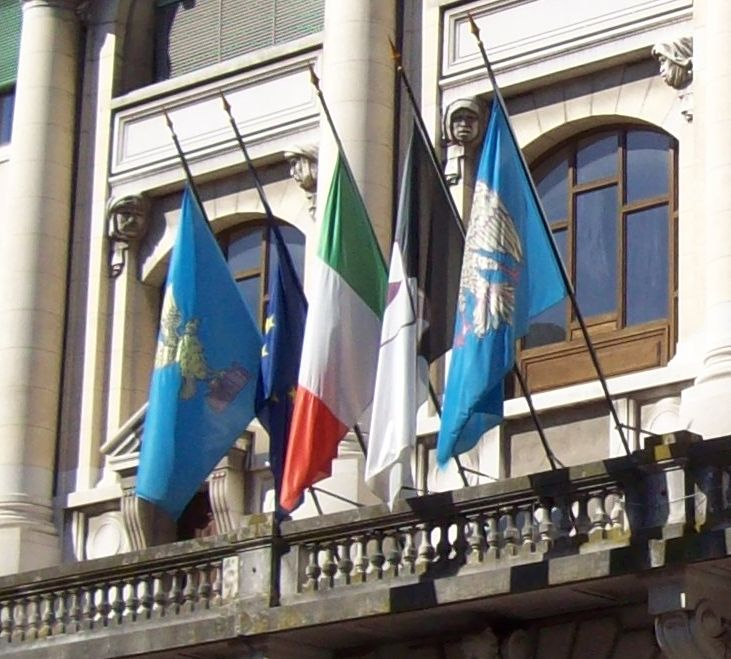
Town Hall of Udine: the flag of Friuli (the first on the right) displayed together with the flags of the Municipality, Italy, the EU and the Friuli-Venezia Giulia Autonomous Region

In many public areas, the Friulian flag is displayed alongside the flags of Friuli-Venezia Giulia, Italy, and the EU.

3 April marks the anniversary of the founding of the patriarchal state of Aquileia (under Regional Law no. 6 of 27 March 2015) and is celebrated with the "Fieste de Patrie dal Friûl" (Celebration of the Friulian homeland). This celebration marks a particular occasion for members of the community and many public entities to display the Friulian Flag.

The current version of the Friulian flag was designed in the 1970s by Giorgio Jus (S. Vito al Tagliamento, 1940) upon request by the leaders of Movimento Friuli (a regionalist political party in Friuli) and is a modern stylisation inspired by the original medieval flag. The first prototype of the modern version of the Friulian flag was printed in Codroipo on 24 July 1974 by the Movimento Friuli and read "FRIÛL" underneath the eagle.

== Coats of arms inspired by the Friulian flag ==
The Friulian flag inspired the coats of arms of several modern institutions, including the former Province of Udine, the University of Udine, the city of Aquileia, the Friulian Philological Society. The colours of the Friulian flag (yellow and azure) were the inspiration for the backgrounds of the standards of the former Provinces of Pordenone and Gorizia. From 1923 to 1927, the Friulian flag was the official crest of the Province of Friuli.

== Alternative versions ==
=== Wartime Flag ===
A manuscript from the 17th century kept at the Municipal Library of Udine reads that the patriarchal state of Friuli adopted a specific standard during wartime and describes it as follows: "In his war banner, the patriarch of Aquileia used as his insignia a mitre between two white crosiers set in a vermilion field".

The "War flag" of Friuli

However, in recent years, on many balconies and during several events it is possible to see a war flag that differs from the historical one. It is very similar to the one recognised by the law, except for the standard, which is red instead.

=== Nationalist flag ===
There is an extremely uncommon nationalist version of the Friulian flag, consisting of a rectangular standard with three horizontal stripes of the same height coloured blue, yellow, and blue, sometimes with the addition of a yellow five-pointed star in the top left corner or an eagle.

== Flag of Friuli and flag of the Friuli-Venezia Giulia Region ==
Although similar, the Friulian flag should not be confused with the flag of the autonomous region of Friuli-Venezia Giulia. The flag of the autonomous region features an eagle much like the Friulian flag, although the eagle is displayed in a different position. Differences also include the fact that the regional flag was created much more recently (in 1963), and displays symbolism suggesting lack of autonomy.

== The last standard-bearer of the Friulian flag ==
The Friulian state had its own standard-bearer. The last was Marc di Murùs (Marco from Moruzzo) who, owing to his loyalty to the patriarch, was incarcerated in the prison of the castle of Udine by the Republic of Venice after the surrender of the patriarchal state of Friuli to the Venetian Republic on 6 June 1420. After di Maruis died on 19 March 1421 from an illness contracted in jail, the Venetian judges ordered that his corpse be beheaded.
