= Flag of Lazio =

Lazio
- Proportion: 2:3
- Design: The coat of arms of Lazio surrounded by laurel and olive branches, surmounted by a golden crown on a sky-blue field with the words "REGIONE LAZIO" in gold

The flag of Lazio is one of the symbols of the region of Lazio, Italy. The flag is in common use.

== Symbolism ==
The flag is the coat of arms of Lazio surrounded by laurel and olive branches, surmounted by a golden crown on a sky-blue field with the words "Regione Lazio" in gold. The coat of arms of the Lazio region consists of an octagon edged in gold in which the coat of arms of the province of Rome are inserted in the centre and the coats of arms of the provinces of Frosinone, Latina, Rieti and Viterbo tied together by a tricolour ribbon.

== History ==
Flag of the Papal States (pre–1808)

Papal States (1803–1825)

Papal States (1825–1870)

Roman Republic (1798–1799)

Roman Republic (1849)

Principality of Pontecorvo (1806–1815)

Republic of Pontecorvo (1820–1821)

de facto flag used in 1995
