= Flag of Abruzzo =

- Proportion: 2:3
- Adopted: 21 May 1999
- Design: A burgundy field with the coat of arms of Abruzzo in the center

The flag of Abruzzo the official symbol of the region of Abruzzo, Italy as governed by the regional laws no. 26 (of the 22 of July 1986), no. 29 (of the 21 May 1999) and no. 59 (of the 27 December 2023). The current flag was adopted on 21 May 1999, and modified on 27 December 2023.

== Composition ==
The flag's background is a bright burgundy colour with gold eyelets in the upper part and gold border around the sides. The tricolour blue, white and green regional coat of arms of Abruzzo is located in the centre. Each colour of the emblem represents different well-known geographical features of the area. White, in the top left of the coat of arms represents snowy mountains. The region is home to the highest peaks of the Apennies mountain range. The green in the centre of the crest represents Abruzzo's hilly area including its three national parks. In the bottom left corner of the emblem, the blue represents the Adriatic sea, which is the sea that borders the left of the region.

These three colours are arranged in the geographical proximity to the coastline. The furthest away are the mountains followed by the hills then finally the sea itself.

== Presentation and Display ==
The flag, which must always be kept in good condition, is displayed, together with those of Italy and Europe, outside regional public buildings. These building include the seats of the Regional Council as well as schools. The flag should also be appropriately illuminated during the night and flown at half-mast during funeral events.

The flags use is generally regulated by regional law no. 29 (21 May 1999).

== Historical flags ==
Flag of the French client Republic of Pescara

Flag de facto in use until December 2023
