= Flag of Liguria =

- Use: Civil and state flag
- Proportion: 2:3
- Adopted: 7 July 1997
- Design: A vertical tricolour of green, red and blue; charged with the coat of arms of Liguria.

The flag of Liguria is one of the official symbols of the region of Liguria, Italy. The current flag was adopted on 7 July 1997.

== Symbolism ==
Each color has the following meaning:

- The green represents the Ligurian Alps and the Ligurian Apennines;
- The red represents the blood shed for Italian unification;
- The blue represents the Ligurian Sea.

At the center of the flag is the coat of arms of Liguria: a stylized caravel, symbolizing the maritime traditions of the region and its great navigators, positioned below the historical flag of the Republic of Genoa (the current flag of the modern-day city of Genoa). The four six-pointed stars imposed on the Genovese flag represent the four provinces of Liguria: the Province of Genoa, the Province of Imperia, the Province of La Spezia, and the Province of Savona.

== Adoption ==
La bandiera della Regione Liguria è formata da un drappo di forma rettangolare con al centro lo stemma della Regione Liguria, come individuato dalla legge regionale 15 gennaio 1985 n. 3 (adozione dello stemma e del gonfalone della Regione, ai sensi dell'articolo 1 dello Statuto), posto su fondo a bande verticali di eguale larghezza colorate, da sinistra verso destra, di verde, di rosso e di azzurro mare; lo stemma ha dimensioni pari a tre quinti dell'altezza della bandiera medesima. (L.R. 7 luglio 1997 Art.1)

"The flag of the Liguria Region is formed by a cloth of rectangular shape with the coat of arms of the Liguria Region, as identified by Regional Law No. 3 of 15 January 1985 (the adoption of the emblem and the banner of the Region, in accordance with Article 1 of the Statute), placed on the bottom of colored vertical stripes of equal width, from left to right, green, red and sea-blue sea; the emblem has dimensions equal to three-fifths of the height of the same flag." (Regional Law of 7 July 1997, Article 1 )

=== Gallery ===
Marquisate of Finale

Republic of Noli

Flag of the Republic of Genoa (1005–1797), and the current flag of the modern-day city of Genoa.

Principality of Torriglia

Principality of Seborga (12th century-1729) (speculative)

Duchy of Savoy

Kingdom of Sardinia

Proposed Flag of Liguria by Lega Liguria
