= Flag of Campania =

- Use: Other
- Proportion: 2:3
- Design: Azure, an inescutcheon Argent, a bend Gules

The flag of Campania is the regional flag of Campania in Italy. The flag is the coat of arms of Campania superimposed on the a field of azure. The coat of arms of Campania has as its coat of arms the one that the Maritime Republic of Amalfi gave itself at its dawn. This coat of arms consists of a red band on a white field.
