= Movement for the Autonomy of Romagna =

The Movement for the Autonomy of Romagna (Movimento per l'Autonomia della Romagna, MAR) is a cultural movement active in Romagna, inspired by the political doctrines of regionalism and autonomism.

Romagna is an Italian historical region, currently without its own institutional autonomy: the movement requires the institution of Romagna Region.

The Movement promotes a decentrated distribution of public administrative power, as required by the Fundamental Principles (article 5) in the Constitution of Italian Republic that recognizes both territorial integrity of the Republic and local autonomies. Furthermore, the Movement seeks to protect the great cultural, linguistic, historical, political heritage of Romagna.

The MAR was founded in May 1990 by Stefano Servadei, a Socialist deputy, and Lorenzo Cappelli, a Christian Democratic senator. Currently the president of the Movement is Giovanni Poggiali from Ravenna. Since 2008 Samuele Albonetti from Ravenna, is MAR's secretary, and Davide Cappelli is the Movement's coordinator.
