= Flag of Molise =

- Proportion: 2:3
- Adopted: 12 June 1975
- Design: A field of blue with the coat of arms in the centre, and "Regione Molise" in gold below

The flag of Molise is one of the official symbols of the region of Molise, Italy.

== Symbolism ==
The flag is light blue, with the coat of arms of the region in the centre. The coat of arms is red with a diagonal silver band and an eight-pointed star in the corner. The words "Regione Molise" are in gold below.
