= Flag of Friuli-Venezia Giulia =

Friuli-Venezia Giulia
- Use: Civil and state flag
- Proportion: 3:2
- Adopted: 17 October 2001

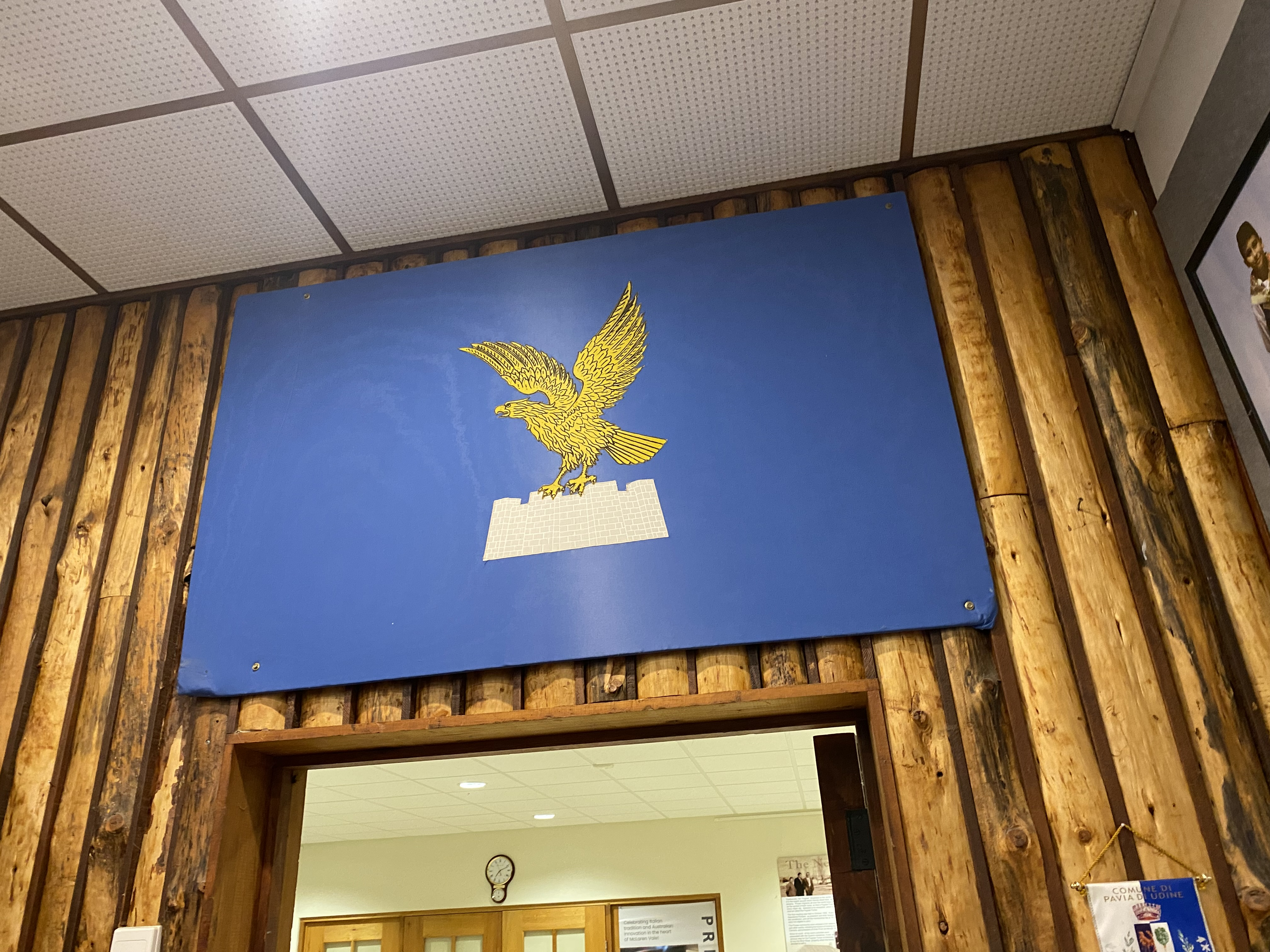
Flag of Friuli-Venezia Giulia seen in person at a venue.

The flag of Friuli-Venezia Giulia (Note: Italian: Bandiera del Friuli-Venezia Giulia; Friulian: Bandiere dal Friûl-Vignesie Julie) depicts a golden eagle facing to its right standing on white fortifications on a blue background.

== Symbolism ==
The colours (gold and blue) originate from the historic flag of Friuli used by the medieval Patria del Friuli – a state that was independent from 1077 to 1420 and ruled by the Patriarchate of Aquileia. The symbols of the eagle comes from the name of the ancient city of Aquileia, which, according to popular legend, derived from an eagle (Latin: aquila) who showed the first citizens the spot where the ancient city should be founded.

The modern flag, adopted in 2001, uses an eagle design found on an antique vase kept in a museum in Aquileia.

== History ==
Patria del Friuli

County of Gorizia

Kingdom of Illyria (1816–1849)

Princely County of Gorizia and Gradisca (1754–1919)

Imperial Free City of Trieste (1849–1922)

Free Territory Trieste (1947–1954)
