= Coat of arms of Campania =

Campania's coat of arms.

The coat of arms of Campania has as its coat of arms the one that the Maritime Republic of Amalfi gave itself at its dawn. This coat of arms consists of a red band on a white field. In reality, the insignia of the Maritime Republic of Amalfi of the 12th century were blue with the white Maltese cross. The flag with a red band on a white field was from the municipality and appeared in the 13th century when the Maritime Republic of Amalfi no longer existed.

The city, despite the independence achieved only in the Middle Ages, was of Roman origin and the red band of the coat of arms tells it: it indicates the "Roman nobility", with a reference to the purple that characterized the patricians. According to tradition, Amalfi was in fact founded in the 5th century AD by Roman families fleeing from the barbarians who had invaded and set fire to Salerno, Stabiae and Naples. The settlers decided to choose a difficult place to reach in order to no longer have anything to do with the other cities of Campania, but the peace did not last long. The city was soon conquered by the Goths and passed from dominion to dominion until independence in 839 AD from the Duchy of Benevento and lasted about 300 years: it was only cut short by the arrival of the Normans, who unified the whole of Southern Italy with Ruggero the Norman.
