= Regions of Italy =

First-level administrative divisions of Italy

Regions of Italy Regioni d'Italia (Italian)
- Category: Regionalised unitary state
- Location: Italian Republic
- Number: 20
- Populations: 122,714 (Aosta Valley) – 10,035,481 (Lombardy)
- Areas: 3,261 km^{2} (1,259 sq mi) (Aosta Valley) – 25,832 km^{2} (9,974 sq mi) (Sicily)
- Government: Regional government, national government
- Subdivisions: Provinces

The regions of Italy (Italian: regioni d'Italia) are the first-level administrative divisions of the unitary Italian Republic, constituting its second NUTS administrative level. There are twenty regions, five of which are autonomous regions with special status. Under the Constitution of Italy, each region is an autonomous entity with defined powers. With the exception of the Aosta Valley (since 1945) and Friuli-Venezia Giulia (since 2015), each region is divided into a number of provinces.

== History ==
During the Kingdom of Italy, regions were mere statistical districts of the central state, with provinces being the most relevant local administration. Under the Republic, they were granted a limited measure of political autonomy by the 1948 Italian Constitution. The original draft list comprised the Salento region (which was eventually included in Apulia); Friuli and Venezia Giulia were separate regions, and Basilicata was named Lucania. Abruzzo and Molise were identified as separate regions in the first draft, but were later merged into Abruzzi e Molise in the final constitution of 1948, before being separated in 1963.

Due to a lack in legislative procedures, implementation of regional autonomy was postponed until the first Regional elections of 1970. The ruling Christian Democracy party did not want the opposition Italian Communist Party to gain power in the regions where it was historically rooted (the red belt of Emilia-Romagna, Tuscany, Umbria and the Marches).

Despite an original marginal role, Regions acquired a significant level of autonomy following a constitutional reform in 2001 (brought about by a centre-left government and confirmed by popular referendum), which granted them residual policy competence with the modification of the title V of the Constitution of Italy. A further federalist reform was proposed by the regionalist party Lega Nord and in 2005, the centre-right government led by Silvio Berlusconi proposed a new reform that would have greatly increased the power of regions.

The proposals, which had been particularly associated with Lega Nord, and seen by some as leading the way to a federal state, were rejected in the 2006 Italian constitutional referendum by 61.7% "no" to 38.3% "yes". The results varied considerably among the regions, ranging from 55.3% in favour in Veneto to 82% against in Calabria.

== Politics and government ==
Regions coloured by the winning coalition (as of November 2024)

Contrasting the parliamentary system of Italy, most regions adopt an "anomalous presidential system" or prime-ministerial system with an executive presidency. Each region has an elected parliament, usually called Consiglio Regionale (Regional Council), with some exceptions (Emilia-Romagna, Umbria, Sicily), and a government called Giunta Regionale (Regional Government), headed by a president called Presidente della Giunta Regionale (President of the Regional Government) or Presidente della Regione (President of the Region). The latter is directly elected by the citizens of each region, with the exceptions of Aosta Valley and Trentino-Alto Adige/Südtirol regions where the president is chosen by the regional council.

According to article 122 of the Italian Constitution, "The President of the Regional Executive shall be elected by universal and direct suffrage, unless the regional statute provides otherwise". Article 123, first paragraph: "Each Region shall have a statute which, in compliance with the Constitution, shall lay down the form of government and basic principles for the organisation of the Region and the conduct of its business". Article 126, last paragraphs: "The Regional Council may adopt a reasoned motion of no confidence against the President of the Executive that is undersigned by at least one-fifth of its members and adopted by roll call vote with an absolute majority of members. The motion may not be debated before three days have elapsed since its introduction. The adoption of a no confidence motion against a President of the Executive elected by universal and direct suffrage, and the removal, permanent inability, death or voluntary resignation of the President of the Executive entail the resignation of the Executive and the dissolution of the Council. The same effects are produced by the simultaneous resignation of the majority of the Council members". Under the 1995 electoral law, later slightly changed by most regions, the winning coalition receives an absolute majority of seats on the Council. The President chairs the Government, and nominates or dismisses its members, called Assessori.

In the Trentino-Alto Adige/Südtirol region, the regional council is made up of the joint session of the two provincial councils of Trentino and of South Tyrol. The regional president is one of the two provincial presidents.

The list below shows the number of regions governed by each coalition since 1995:

Centre-left
Centre-right
Others

== Regions ==
Flag	Region Italian name (if different)	Status	Population 1 January 2026		Area		Pop. density (p/km^{2})	HDI 2023	Capital city	President	Number of comuni	Prov. or metrop. cities
Flag	Region Italian name (if different)	Status	Number	%	km^{2}	%	Pop. density (p/km^{2})	HDI 2023	Capital city	President	Number of comuni	Prov. or metrop. cities
	Abruzzo	Ordinary	1,267,222	2.15%	10,832 km^{2} (4,182 sq mi)	3.59%	117.1	0.909	L'Aquila	Marco Marsilio; Brothers of Italy	305	4
Valle d'Aosta	Aosta Valley; Valle d'Aosta/Vallée d'Aoste	Autonomous	122,554	0.21%	3,261 km^{2} (1,259 sq mi)	1.08%	37.63	0.908	Aosta	Renzo Testolin; Valdostan Union	74	1
Apulia	Apulia; Puglia	Ordinary	3,865,277	6.56%	19,541 km^{2} (7,545 sq mi)	6.47%	198.3	0.878	Bari	Antonio Decaro; Democratic Party	257	6
	Basilicata	Ordinary	525,281	0.89%	10,073 km^{2} (3,889 sq mi)	3.33%	52.61	0.888	Potenza	Vito Bardi; Forza Italia	131	2
	Calabria	Ordinary	1,827,571	3.10%	15,222 km^{2} (5,877 sq mi)	5.04%	120.4	0.867	Catanzaro	Roberto Occhiuto; Forza Italia	404	5
	Campania	Ordinary	5,568,703	9.45%	13,671 km^{2} (5,278 sq mi)	4.53%	407.8	0.876	Naples	Roberto Fico; Five Star Movement	550	5
	Emilia-Romagna	Ordinary	4,477,009	7.60%	22,453 km^{2} (8,669 sq mi)	7.43%	198.5	0.943	Bologna	Michele De Pascale; Democratic Party	330	9
Friuli-Venezia Giulia	Friuli-Venezia Giulia; Furlanija-Julijska Krajina/Friûl-Vignesie Julie/Friaul-Julisch Venetien	Autonomous	1,193,496	2.02%	7,924 km^{2} (3,059 sq mi)	2.62%	150.5	0.926	Trieste	Massimiliano Fedriga; League	215	4
	Lazio	Ordinary	5,709,444	9.69%	17,232 km^{2} (6,653 sq mi)	5.70%	331.4	0.938	Rome	Francesco Rocca; Independent	378	5
	Liguria	Ordinary	1,511,988	2.57%	5,416 km^{2} (2,091 sq mi)	1.79%	278.8	0.921	Genoa	Marco Bucci; Independent	234	4
Lombardy	Lombardy; Lombardia	Ordinary	10,065,694	17.08%	23,864 km^{2} (9,214 sq mi)	7.90%	420.5	0.936	Milan	Attilio Fontana; League	1,501	12
	Marche	Ordinary	1,479,832	2.51%	9,401 km^{2} (3,630 sq mi)	3.11%	158.5	0.923	Ancona	Francesco Acquaroli; Brothers of Italy	225	5
	Molise	Ordinary	285,940	0.49%	4,461 km^{2} (1,722 sq mi)	1.48%	64.56	0.894	Campobasso	Francesco Roberti; Forza Italia	136	2
Piedmont	Piedmont; Piemonte	Ordinary	4,255,006	7.22%	25,387 km^{2} (9,802 sq mi)	8.40%	167.6	0.920	Turin	Alberto Cirio; Forza Italia	1,180	8
Sardinia, Italy	Sardinia; Sardegna	Autonomous	1,554,490	2.64%	24,100 km^{2} (9,300 sq mi)	7.98%	64.79	0.887	Cagliari	Alessandra Todde; Five Star Movement	377	8
Sicily	Sicily; Sicilia	Autonomous	4,775,194	8.10%	25,832 km^{2} (9,974 sq mi)	8.55%	185.0	0.868	Palermo	Renato Schifani; Forza Italia	391	9
Trentino-South Tyrol	Trentino-South Tyrol; Trentino-Alto Adige/Südtirol	Autonomous	1,090,818	1.85%	13,606 km^{2} (5,253 sq mi)	4.50%	79.82	0.935 (average); 0.944 (Trentino); 0.926 (South Tyrol)	Trento	Arno Kompatscher; South Tyrolean People's Party	282	2
Tuscany	Tuscany; Toscana	Ordinary	3,659,222	6.21%	22,987 km^{2} (8,875 sq mi)	7.61%	159.3	0.930	Florence	Eugenio Giani; Democratic Party	273	10
	Umbria	Ordinary	850,627	1.44%	8,464 km^{2} (3,268 sq mi)	2.80%	100.7	0.917	Perugia	Stefania Proietti; Independent	92	2
	Veneto	Ordinary	4,857,460	8.24%	18,345 km^{2} (7,083 sq mi)	6.07%	264.5	0.922	Venice	Alberto Stefani; League	559	7
Italy	Italy; Italia	—	58,942,828	100.00%	302,068.26 km^{2} (116,629.21 sq mi)	100.00%	195.1	0.915	Rome	Sergio Mattarella; Independent	7,894	110

== Macroregions ==
Macroregions are the first-level NUTS of the European Union.^{(it)}

Map	Macroregion Italian name	Regions	Major city	Population 1 January 2026		Area (km^{2})		Population density (km^{2})	MEPs
Map	Macroregion Italian name	Regions	Major city	Number	%	km^{2}	%	Population density (km^{2})	MEPs
	Centre; Centro	Lazio; Marche; Tuscany; Umbria	Rome	11,740,836	19.91%	58,084 km^{2} (22,426 sq mi)	19.23%	201.4	15
	North-West; Nord-Ovest	Aosta Valley; Liguria; Lombardy; Piedmont	Milan	15,848,100	26.87%	57,928 km^{2} (22,366 sq mi)	19.18%	275.4	20
	North-East; Nord-Est	Emilia-Romagna; Friuli-Venezia Giulia; Trentino-Alto Adige/Südtirol; Veneto	Bologna	11,561,676	19.60%	62,328 km^{2} (24,065 sq mi)	20.63%	186.4	15
	South; Sud	Abruzzo; Apulia; Basilicata; Calabria; Campania; Molise	Naples	13,451,861	22.81%	73,800 km^{2} (28,500 sq mi)	24.43%	180.8	18
	Islands; Isole or Insulare	Sardinia; Sicily	Palermo	6,380,649	10.82%	49,932 km^{2} (19,279 sq mi)	16.53%	126.8	8

== Status ==
The 5 autonomous regions in red and the 15 ordinary regions in gray

Every region has a statute that serves as a regional constitution, determining the form of government and the fundamental principles of the organization and the functioning of the region, as prescribed by the Constitution of Italy (Article 123). Although all the regions except Tuscany define themselves in various ways as an "autonomous Region" in the first article of their Statutes, fifteen regions have ordinary statutes and five have special statutes, granting them extended autonomy.

=== Regions with ordinary statute ===
These regions, whose statutes are approved by their regional councils, were created in 1970, even though the Italian Constitution dates back to 1948. Since the constitutional reform of 2001 they have had residual legislative powers: the regions have exclusive legislative power with respect to any matters not expressly reserved to state law (Article 117). Yet their financial autonomy is quite modest: they keep just 20% of all levied taxes, mostly used to finance the region-based healthcare system.

=== Autonomous regions with special statute ===
Article 116 of the Italian Constitution grants home rule to five regions: the Aosta Valley, Friuli-Venezia Giulia, Sardinia, Sicily, and Trentino-Alto Adige/Südtirol, allowing them some legislative, administrative and financial power to a varying extent, depending on their specific statute. These regions became autonomous in order to take into account cultural differences and protect linguistic minorities. Moreover, the government wanted to prevent them from potentially seceding or being taken away from Italy after its defeat in World War II.

== Representation in the Senate ==
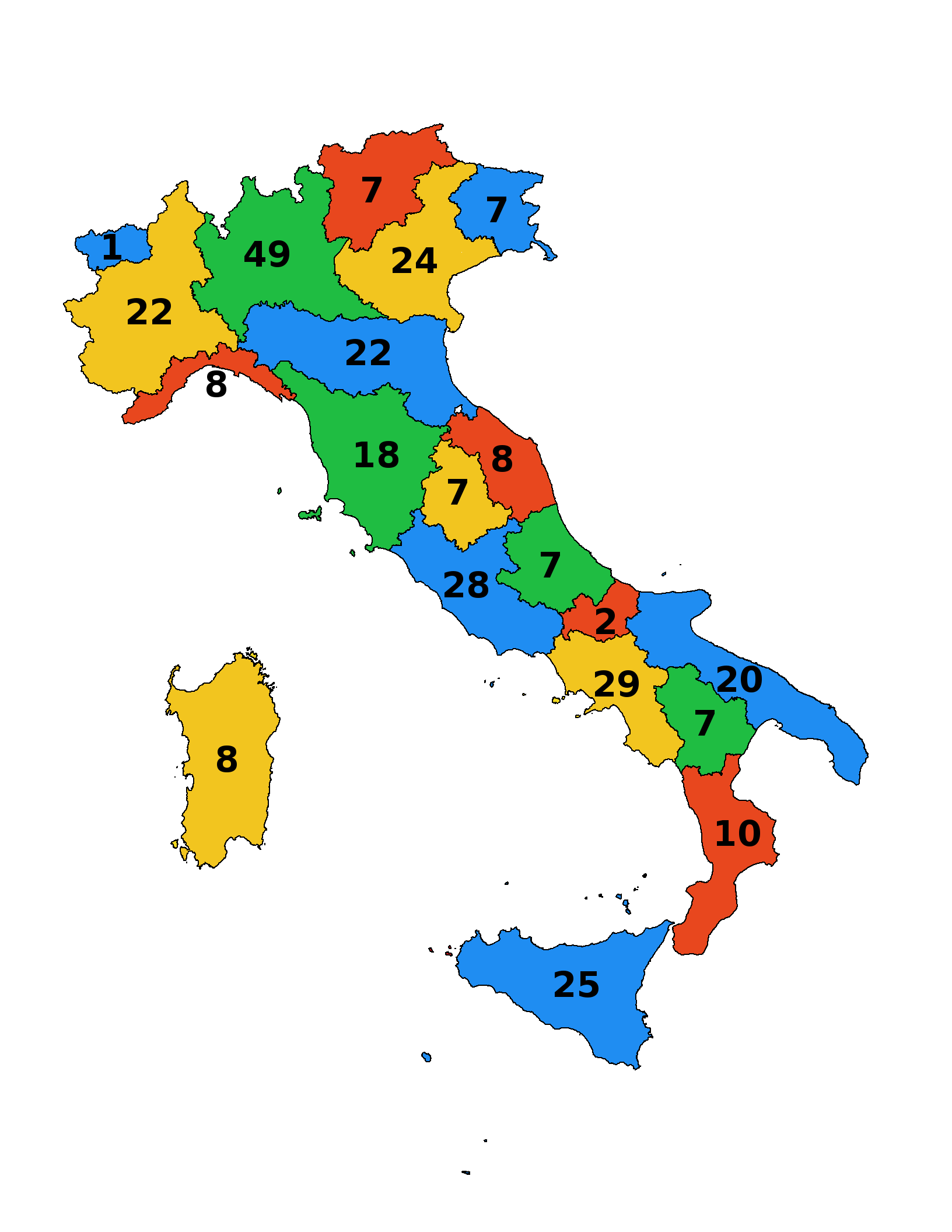
Number of senators assigned to each Region before 2020

Article 57 of the Constitution of Italy originally established that the Senate of the Republic was to be elected on a regional basis by Italian citizens aged 25 or older (unlike the Chamber of the Deputies, which was elected on a national basis and by all Italian citizens aged 18 or older). No region could have fewer than 7 senators, except for the two smallest regions: Aosta Valley (1 senator) and Molise (2 senators). From 2006 to 2020, 6 out of 315 senators (and 12 out of 630 deputies) were elected by Italians residing abroad.

After two constitutional amendments were passed respectively in 2020 (by constitutional referendum) and 2021, however, there have been changes. The Senate is still elected on a regional basis, but the number of senators was reduced from 315 to 200, who are now elected by all citizens aged 18 or older, just like deputies (themselves being reduced from 630 to 400). Italians residing abroad now elect 4 senators (and 8 deputies).

The remaining 196 senators are assigned to each region proportionally according to their population. The amended Article 57 of the Constitution provides that no region can have fewer than 3 senators representing it, barring Aosta Valley and Molise, which retained 1 and 2 senators respectively.

Region	Seats	Region	Seats	Region	Seats
Abruzzo	4	Friuli-Venezia Giulia	4	Sardinia	5
Aosta Valley	1	Lazio	18	Sicily	16
Apulia	13	Liguria	5	Trentino-Alto Adige/Südtirol	6
Basilicata	3	Lombardy	31	Tuscany	12
Calabria	6	Marche	5	Umbria	3
Campania	18	Molise	2	Veneto	16
Emilia-Romagna	14	Piedmont	14	Overseas constituencies	4

== Economy of regions and macroregions ==
GDP per capita 2018, EUR

Flag	Name	GDP 2018, million EUR	GDP per capita 2018, EUR	GDP 2011, million PPS	GDP per capita 2011, PPS
	Abruzzo	33,900	25,800	29,438	21,900
Valle d'Aosta	Aosta Valley	4,900	38,900	4,236	33,000
	Apulia	76,600	19,000	68,496	16,700
	Basilicata	12,600	22,200	10,517	17,900
	Calabria	33,300	17,000	32,357	16,100
	Campania	108,000	18,600	91,658	15,700
	Emilia-Romagna	161,000	36,200	139,597	31,400
	Friuli-Venezia Giulia	38,000	31,200	35,855	29,000
	Lazio	198,000	33,600	168,609	29,300
	Liguria	49,900	32,100	43,069	26,700
	Lombardy	388,800	38,600	330,042	33,200
	Marche	43,200	28,300	40,014	25,500
	Molise	6,500	20,900	6,278	19,700
	Piedmont	137,000	31,500	123,336	27,600
Sardinia, Italy	Sardinia	34,900	21,200	32,377	19,300
	Sicily	89,200	17,800	82,183	16,300
Trentino-South Tyrol	Trentino-Alto Adige/Südtirol	41,700	39,200	35,041	33,700
	Tuscany	118,000	31,500	103,775	27,600
	Umbria	22,500	25,400	21,078	23,200
	Veneto	163,000	33,200	146,369	29,600

Code	Name	GDP 2011, million EUR	GDP per capita 2011, EUR	GDP 2011, million PPS	GDP per capita 2011, PPS
ITE	Centre	340,669	28,400	333,475	27,800
ITC	North-West	511,484	31,700	500,683	31,000
ITD	North-East	364,560	31,200	356,862	30,600
ITF	South	243,895	17,200	238,744	16,800
ITG	Islands	117,031	17,400	114,560	17,000
-	Extra-regio	2,771	–	2,712	–

== See also ==
- Italian NUTS level 1 regions
- Regional council (Italy)
- List of current presidents of regions of Italy
- List of Italian regions by GDP
- List of Italian regions by GRP per capita
- List of Italian regions by Human Development Index
- Flags of regions of Italy
- ISO 3166-2:IT

=== Other administrative divisions ===
- Provinces of Italy
- Metropolitan cities of Italy
- Municipalities of Italy
