= Trentino-Alto Adige/Südtirol =

Autonomous region of Italy

Coordinates: 46°04′N 11°07′E

Trentino-Alto Adige/Südtirol Trentino-Alto Adige (Italian) Trentino-Südtirol (German) Trentin-Südtirol (Ladin) Trentino-South Tyrol
- Autonomous region
- Flag Coat of arms

- Location of Trentino-Alto Adige/Südtirol in Italy
- Country: Italy
- Capital: Trento

Government
  - Type: Parliamentary system
  - President: Arno Kompatscher (SVP)

Area
  - Total: 13,605.50 km^{2} (5,253.11 sq mi)

Population (2026)
  - Total: 1,090,818
  - Density: 80.17478/km^{2} (207.6517/sq mi)
  - Official languages: Italian; German
  - Other languages: in some municipalities: Ladin; Mocheno; Cimbrian
- Demonym(s): English: Trentino-Alto Adigan or Trentino-South Tyrolean; Italian: trentino (m.), trentina (f.); altoatesino (m.), altoatesina (f.), or sudtirolese German: Südtiroler (m.); Südtirolerin (f.)

Citizenship
  - Italian: 89.9%

GDP
  - Total: €47.180 billion (2021)
- Time zone: UTC+01:00 (CET)
  - Summer (DST): UTC+02:00 (CEST)
- ISO 3166 code: IT-32
- NUTS Region: ITH
- Website: region.tnst.it regione.taa.it

Trentino-Alto Adige/Südtirol (Italian: Trentino-Alto Adige [trenˈtiːno ˈalto ˈaːdidʒe]; Austrian German: Trentino-Südtirol; Ladin: Trentin-Südtirol), often known in English as Trentino-South Tyrol or by its Italian name Trentino-Alto Adige, (Note: Pronunciation: US: /trɛnˌtiːnoʊ ˌɑːltoʊ ˈɑːdiːdʒeɪ/ tren-TEE-noh AHL-toh AH-dee-jay, UK: /- ˈɑːdɪdʒeɪ, - ˌæltoʊ ˈædɪdʒeɪ/ - AH-dij-ay, - AL-toh AD-ij-ay.) is an autonomous region of Italy, located in the northern part of the country. The region has a population of nearly 1.1 million, of whom 62% speak Italian as their mother tongue (in areas where the local languages are transition dialects between Eastern Lombard and Venetian), 30% speak German (around 93% of whom are fluent in the local South Tyrolean dialect of Bavarian), and the remaining are minority speakers of Ladin, Mòcheno or Cimbrian and immigrant communities speaking several foreign languages. Since the 1970s, most legislative and administrative powers have been transferred to the two self-governing provinces that make up the region: the province of Trento, commonly known as Trentino, and the province of Bolzano, commonly known as South Tyrol (Italian: Alto Adige; German: Südtirol). In South Tyrol, German remains the sizeable majority language.

From the 9th century until 1806, the region was part of the Holy Roman Empire. After briefly being part of the newly-formed Kingdom of Bavaria and the short-lived Napoleonic Kingdom of Italy, the region was part of the County of Tyrol within the Austrian Empire and its successor Austria-Hungary from 1815 until its 1919 transfer to Italy in the Treaty of Saint-Germain-en-Laye at the end of World War I. Together with the Austrian state of Tyrol, it is part of the Euroregion of Tyrol-South Tyrol-Trentino.

== History ==
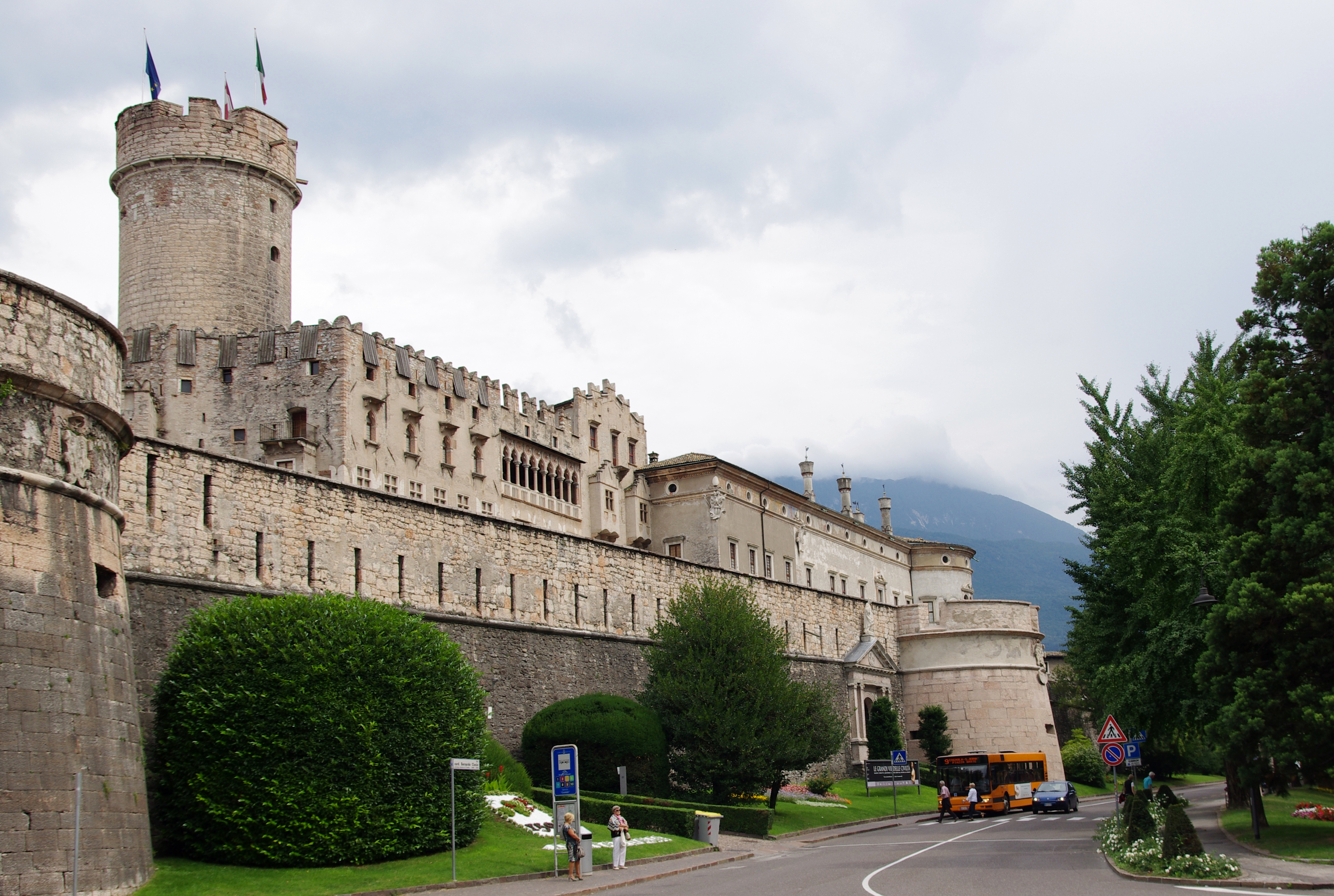
Castello del Buonconsiglio (Buonconsiglio Castle) in Trento was the seat of the prince-bishops from the 13th century to 1803.

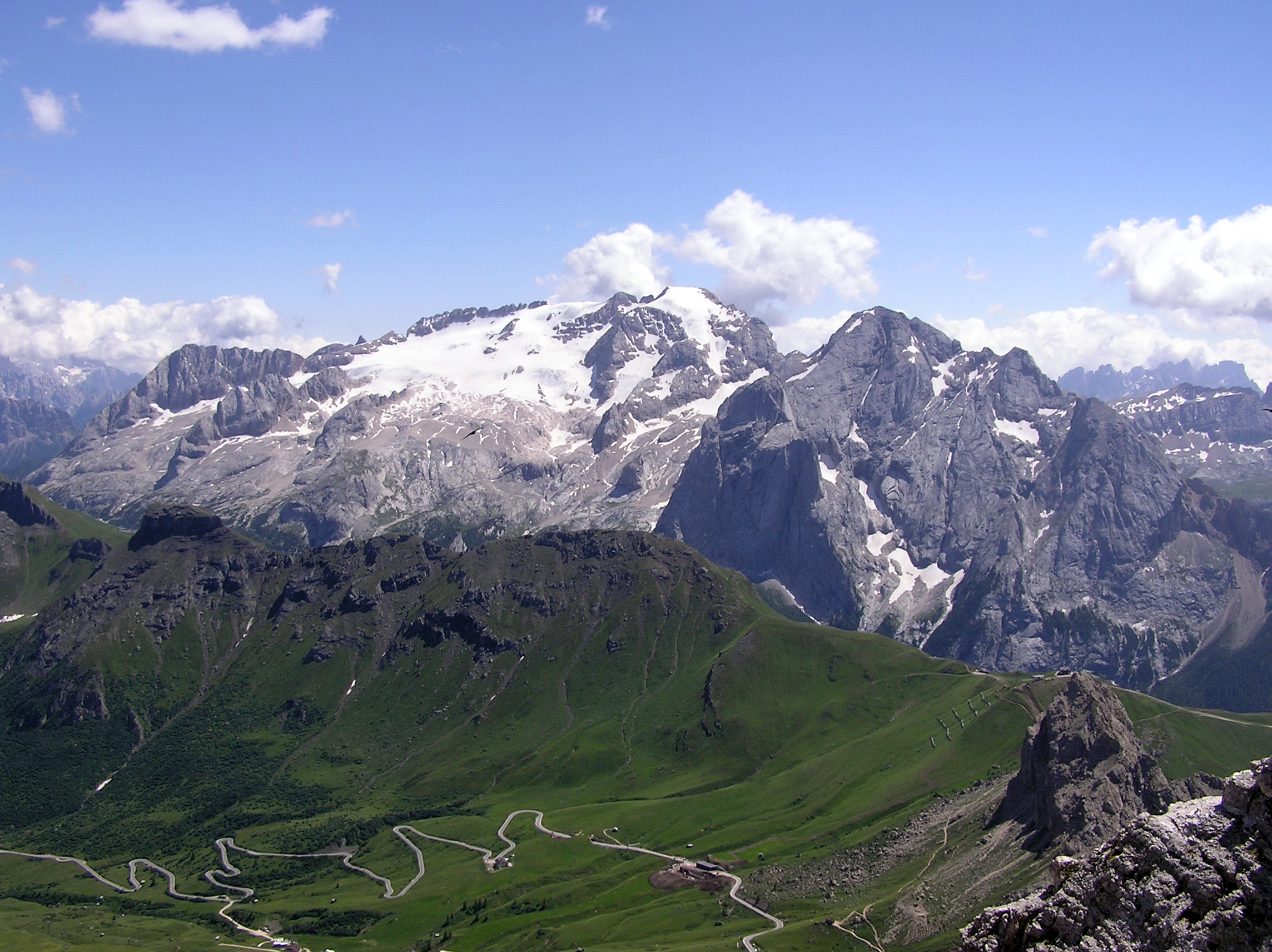
The Marmolada, in the northeast, is the highest mountain in the Dolomites

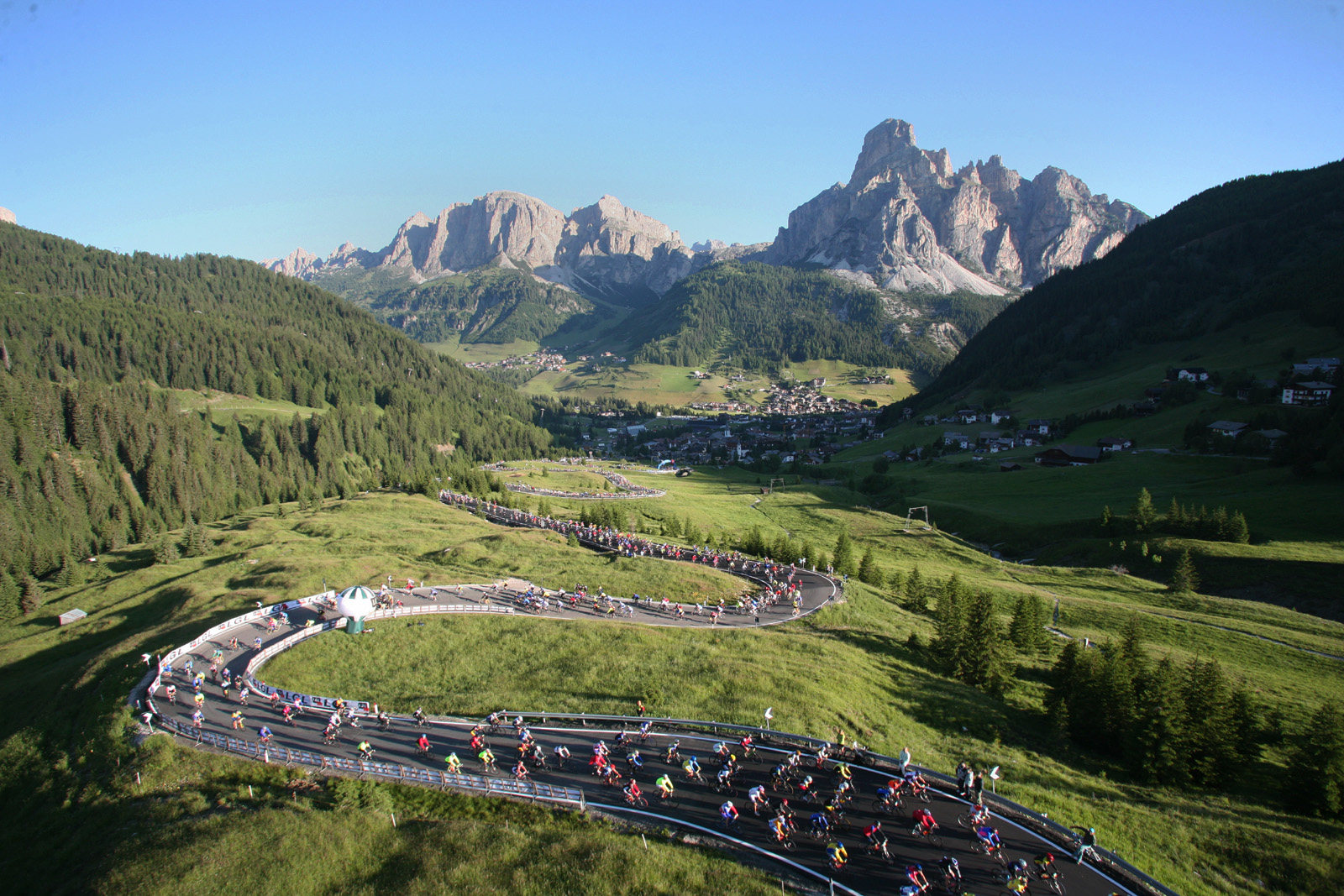
2008 Maratona dles Dolomites ascent to Campolongo Pass, with Corvara in the background

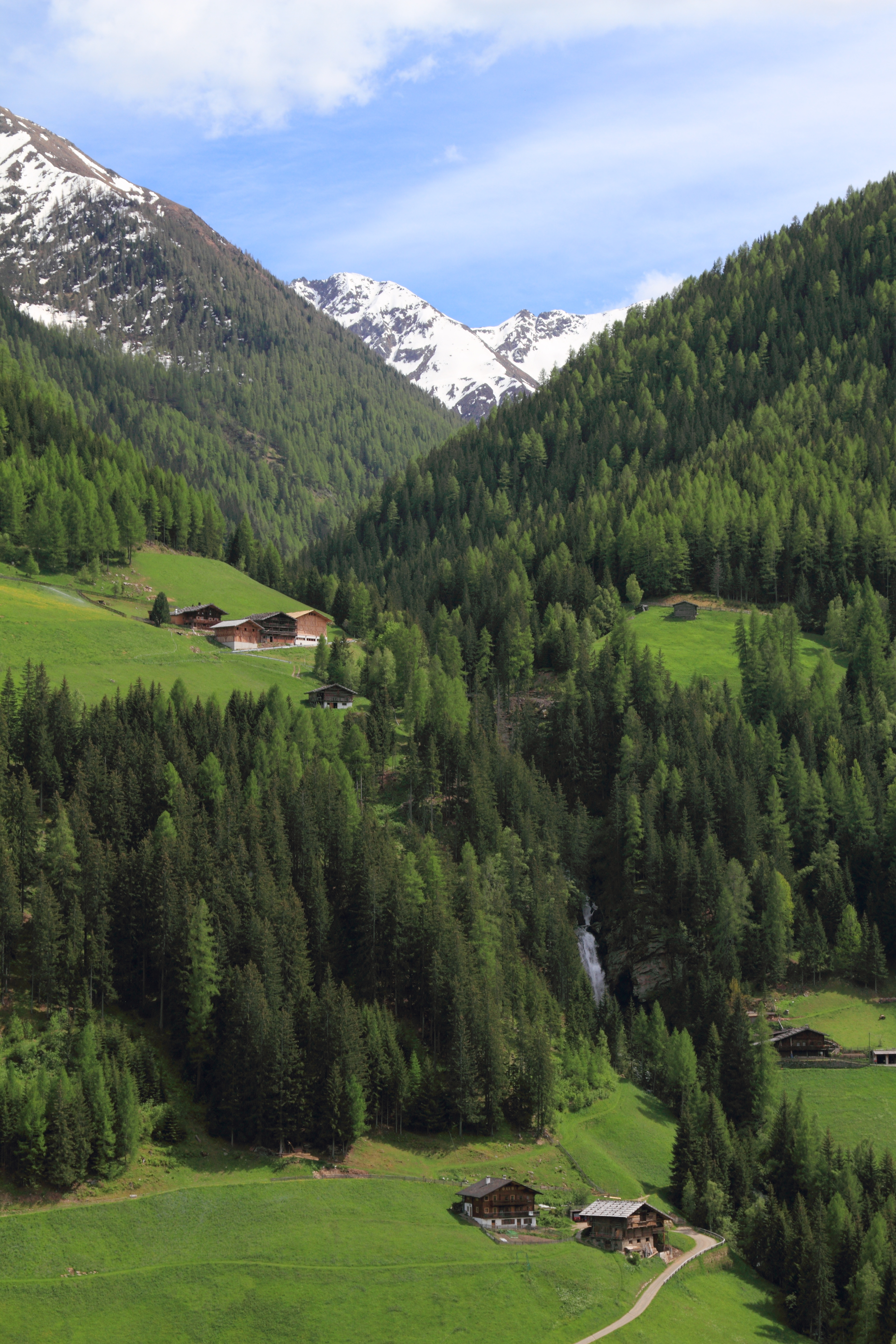
Ulten Valley

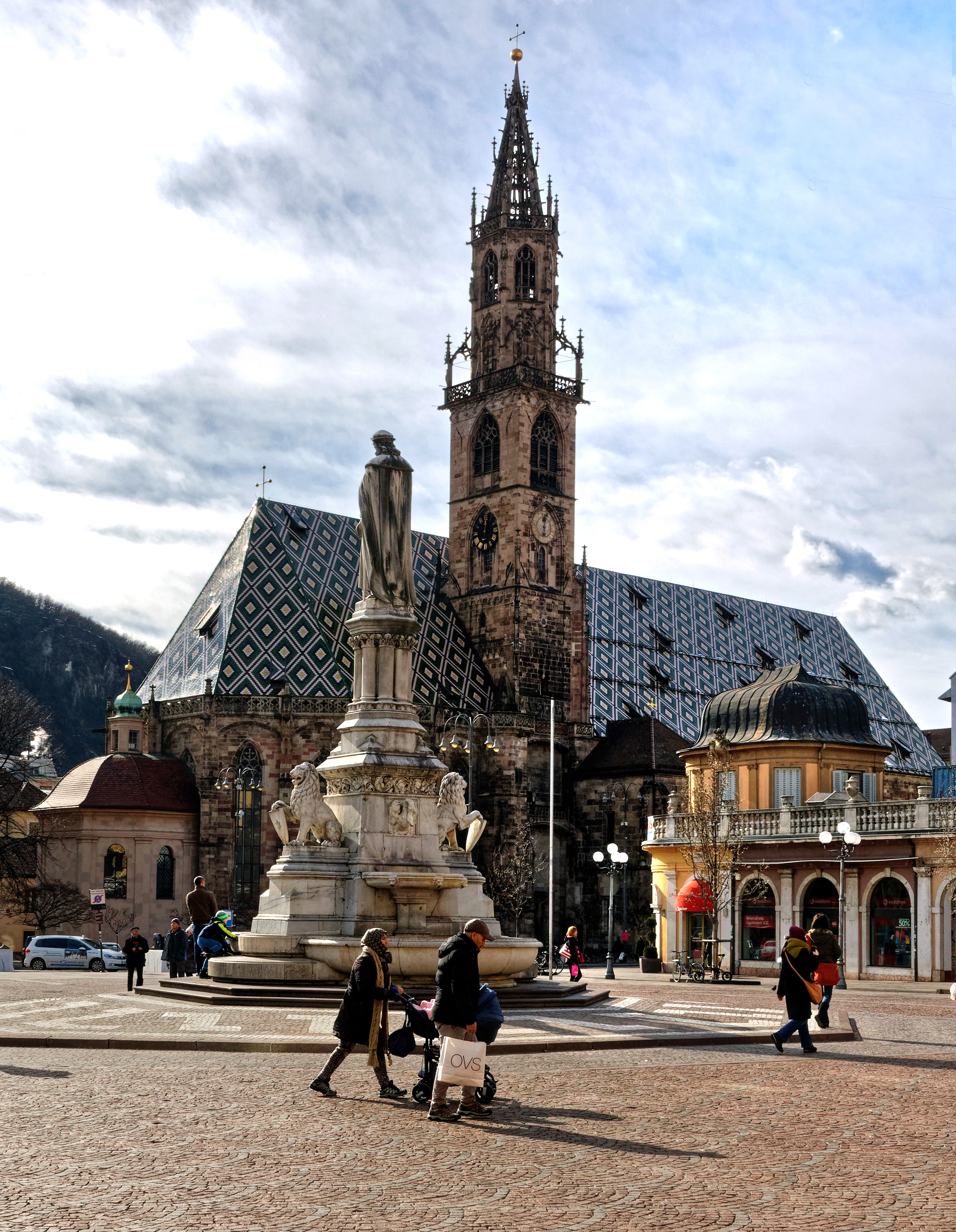
Cathedral Maria Himmelfahrt in Bolzano, capital of South Tyrol

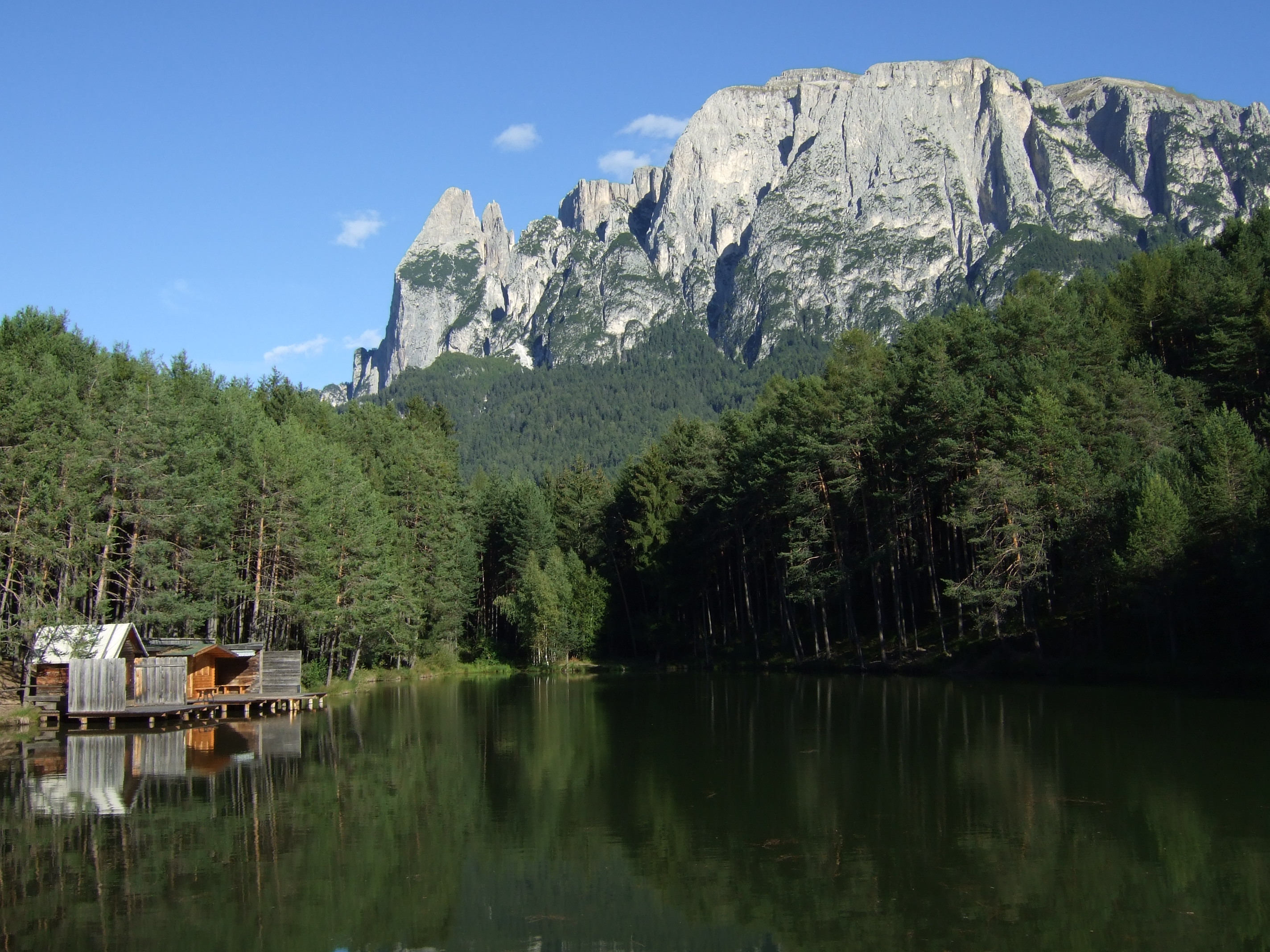
View of the Rosengarten group in South Tyrol

=== Early history and the County of Tyrol ===
The Romans conquered the region in 15 BC. After the end of the Western Roman Empire, it was divided between the invading Germanic tribes in the Lombard Duchy of Tridentum (today's Trentino), the Alamannic Vinschgau, and the Bavarians (who took the remaining part). After the creation of the Kingdom of Italy under Charlemagne, the Marquisate of Verona included the areas south of Bolzano, while the Duchy of Bavaria received the remaining part.

From the 11th century onwards, part of the region was governed by the prince-bishops of Trent and Brixen, to whom the Holy Roman Emperors had given extensive temporal powers over their bishoprics. Soon, they were overruled by the Counts of Tyrol and Counts of Görz, who also controlled the Puster Valley: in 1363 its last titular countess, Margarete of Tyrol, ceded the region to the House of Habsburg. The regions north of Salorno were largely Germanized in the early Middle Ages, and important German poets like Arbeo of Freising and Oswald von Wolkenstein were born and lived in the southern part of Tyrol.

=== Napoleonic Wars and Austrian rule ===
The two bishoprics were secularized (mediatized) to the Habsburgs by the Reichsdeputationshauptschluss in 1803 and incorporated into Tyrol. Two years later, following the Austrian defeat at Austerlitz, the region was given to Napoleon's ally Bavaria (Treaty of Pressburg, 1805). Under Bavarian rule the county was abolished and most of the modern region became part of the Eisack and Etsch Kreise ("circles"), with a small part within the Innkreis. The new rulers provoked a popular rebellion in 1809, led by Andreas Hofer, a landlord from St. Leonhard in Passeier; this rebellion was crushed the same year. At the resulting Treaty of Paris (28 February 1810), Bavaria ceded the southern part of Tyrol (Trentino and the city of Bolzano) to the Napoleonic Kingdom of Italy. Under French control this mostly became the Haut Adige department (Italian: "Alto Adige"; German: "Hochetsch"), literally "High Adige", in order to avoid any reference to the former County of Tyrol. After Napoleon's defeat in 1815, the region returned to Austria.

Under Austrian rule, the territory of today's province of South Tyrol was called südliches Tirol or Deutschsüdtirol, but was occasionally also referred to as Mitteltirol, i.e., Middle Tyrol, due to its geographic position, while Südtirol (Italian: Tirolo meridionale), i.e., South Tyrol, indicated mostly today's province of Trentino. Trentino was also called Welschtirol ("Romance Tyrol", Italian: Tirolo italiano) or Welschsüdtirol ("Romance South Tyrol", Italian: Tirolo meridionale italiano). Sometimes Südtirol also indicated the whole of the Trentino-Alto Adige/Südtirol region.

=== World War I and Italian annexation ===
During the First World War, major battles were fought high in the Alps and Dolomites between Austro-Hungarian Kaiserjäger and Italian Alpini, for whom control of the region was a key strategic objective. The collapse of the Austro-Hungarian war effort enabled Italian troops to occupy the region in 1918 and its annexation was confirmed in the post-war treaties, which awarded the region to Italy under the terms of the Treaty of Saint-Germain.

=== Italianisation and World War II ===
Under the dictatorship of Benito Mussolini, the Fascist dictator of Italy (ruled 1922–1943), the German population was subjected to an increased forced programme of Italianization: all references to old Tyrol were banned and the region was referred to as Venezia Tridentina between 1919 and 1947, in an attempt to justify the Italian claims to the area by historically linking the region to one of the Roman Regions of Italy (Regio X Venetia et Histria). Hitler and Mussolini agreed in 1938 that the German-speaking population would be transferred to German-ruled territory or dispersed around Italy, but the outbreak of the Second World War prevented them from fully carrying out the relocation. Nevertheless, thousands of people were relocated to Nazi Germany and only with great difficulty managed to return to their ancestral land after the end of the war.

In 1943, when the Italian government signed an armistice with the Allies, the region was occupied by Germany, which reorganised it as the Operation Zone of the Alpine Foothills and put it under the administration of Gauleiter Franz Hofer. The region was de facto annexed to the German Reich (with the addition of the province of Belluno) until the end of the war. This status ended along with the Nazi regime and Italian rule was restored in 1945.

=== Post-war Gruber–De Gasperi Agreement and autonomy ===
Italy and Austria negotiated the Gruber-De Gasperi Agreement in 1946, put into effect in 1947 when the new republican Italian constitution was promulgated, that the region would be granted considerable autonomy. This region was to be a combination of the two provinces (majority-Italian Trentino and the majority-German province, to be called Alto Adige rather than South Tyrol). In the region, German and Italian were both made official languages, and German-language education was permitted once more.

=== South Tyrol conflict and the Second Autonomy Statute ===
However, the implementation of the agreement was not seen as satisfactory by either the German-speaking population or the Austrian government. The issue became the cause of significant friction between the two countries and was taken up by the United Nations in 1960. A fresh round of negotiations took place in 1961 but proved unsuccessful, partly because of popular discontent and a campaign of terrorism and bombings by German-speaking autonomists and separatists led by the South Tyrolean Liberation Committee.

The issue began to be resolved in 1971, when a new Austro-Italian treaty was signed and ratified. It stipulated that disputes in South Tyrol would be submitted for settlement to the International Court of Justice in The Hague; that while staying in the two-province region, South Tyrol would receive greater autonomy within Italy (and apart from Trentino); and that Austria would not interfere in South Tyrol's internal affairs. The new agreement proved broadly satisfactory to the parties involved and the separatist tensions eased.

=== Resolution of the international dispute ===
Thus, the official name of the province had transitioned from 1927/Fascist-era "Bozen", after the capital (Bolzano in Italian), to 1947/Post-WW2 "Alto Adige/Tiroler Etschland", after the river valley, to "Autonomous Province Bozen – South Tyrol" in 1972. Technically, the dispute between Italy and Austria was not solved until much later, with the UN declaring the dispute over only in 1992. Matters were helped further by Austria's accession to the European Union in 1995, which has helped to improve cross-border cooperation.

=== Contemporary politics and self-determination ===
Moves toward further self-determination continue to grab headlines from time to time. In May 2006, former Italian president and then-senator-for-life Francesco Cossiga introduced a bill that would allow the region to hold a referendum, in which the local electorate could decide whether to stay within the Italian Republic, become fully independent or return to Austria. Other, less official, votes have been proposed since then, including a 2013 "vote" of the public by the political party, South Tyrol Freedom, asking if voters support "exercising the right of self-determination in order to freely decide the future of South Tyrol," without specifying if that meant reunification with Austria or striking out as an independent nation. With about 15% of the electorate responding, the result was about 92% in favor of leaving Italy (which its constitution forbids). In 2016, Italy held a referendum on constitutional changes in general, but the changes would have led to more centralization, not less, so separatists urged a "no" vote. At the same time, South Tyrol's moderates, who were in power, encouraged support, since "safeguards" allowing for future devolution also would have been part of the changes. In the end, the national referendum failed, but not because of South Tyrol, which voted 64% in favor.

== Geography ==
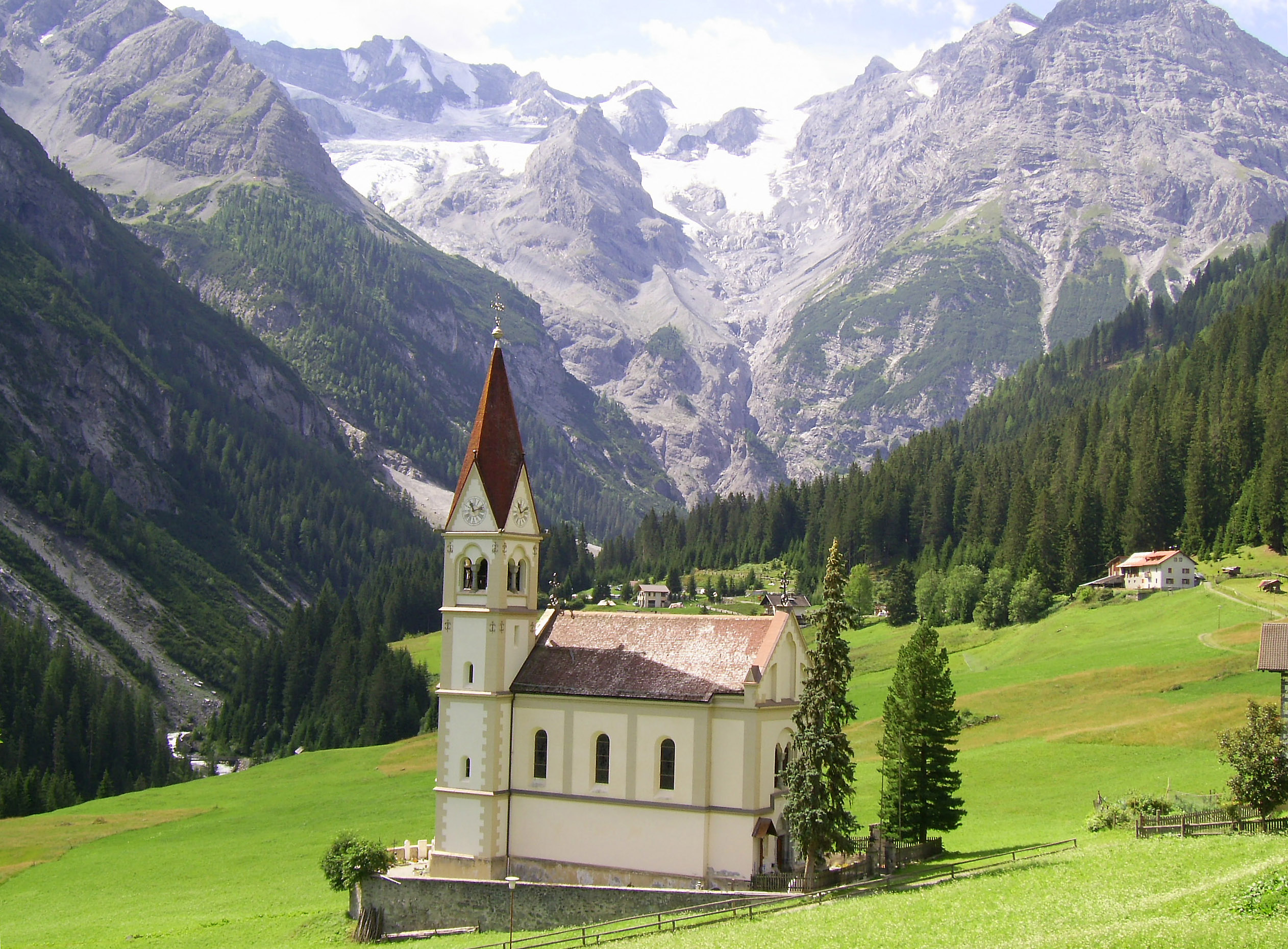
Alpine landscape near the village of Stilfs, South Tyrol

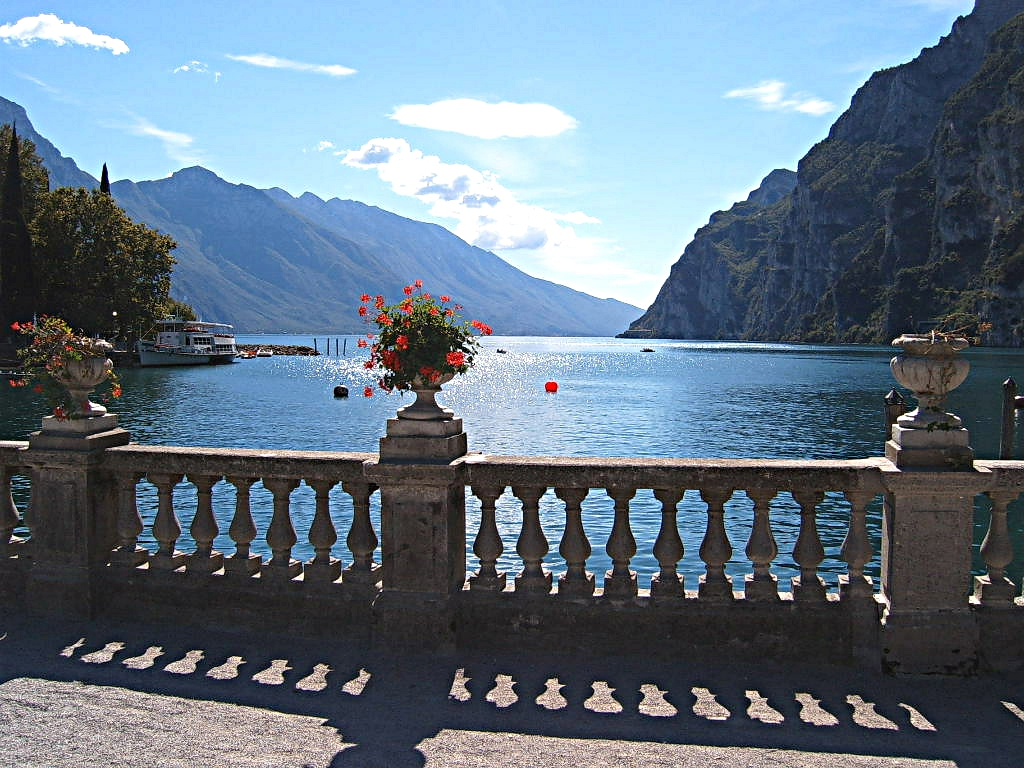
Lake Garda promenade in Riva del Garda, Trentino

The region is bordered by East and North Tyrol (Austria) to the north-east and north respectively, by Graubünden (Switzerland) to the north-west, and by the Italian regions of Lombardy to the west and Veneto to the south and southeast. It covers 13,607 km^{2} (5,254 sq mi). It is extremely mountainous, covering a large part of the Dolomites and the southern Alps.

The region is composed of two provinces, Trentino in the south and South Tyrol in the north.

Trentino has an area of 6,207 km^{2} (2,397 sq mi), most of it mountainous land (20% is over 2,000 m (6,600 ft) and 70% over 1,000 m) and covered by vast forests (50% of the territory). The climate is various through the province, from an alpine climate to a subcontinental one, with warm and variable summers and cold and quite snowy winters. The region has always been a favourite destination for tourists, both in winter for skiing in the high mountains and in summer to visit the wide valleys and many lakes (the largest being Lake Garda).

South Tyrol has an area of 7,398 square kilometres (2,856 square miles), all of it mountainous land and covered by vast forests. The climate is of the continental type, owing to the influence of the many mountain ranges which stand at well over 3,000 metres (9,800 feet) above sea level and the wide valleys through which flow the main river, the Adige, from north to south and its numerous tributaries. In the city of Bolzano, capital of the province, the average air temperature stands at 12.2 °C (54.0 °F) and the average rainfall at 717.7 mm (28.3 in). The lowest pass across the Alps, the Brenner Pass, is located at the far north of the region on the border with Austria.

== Politics ==
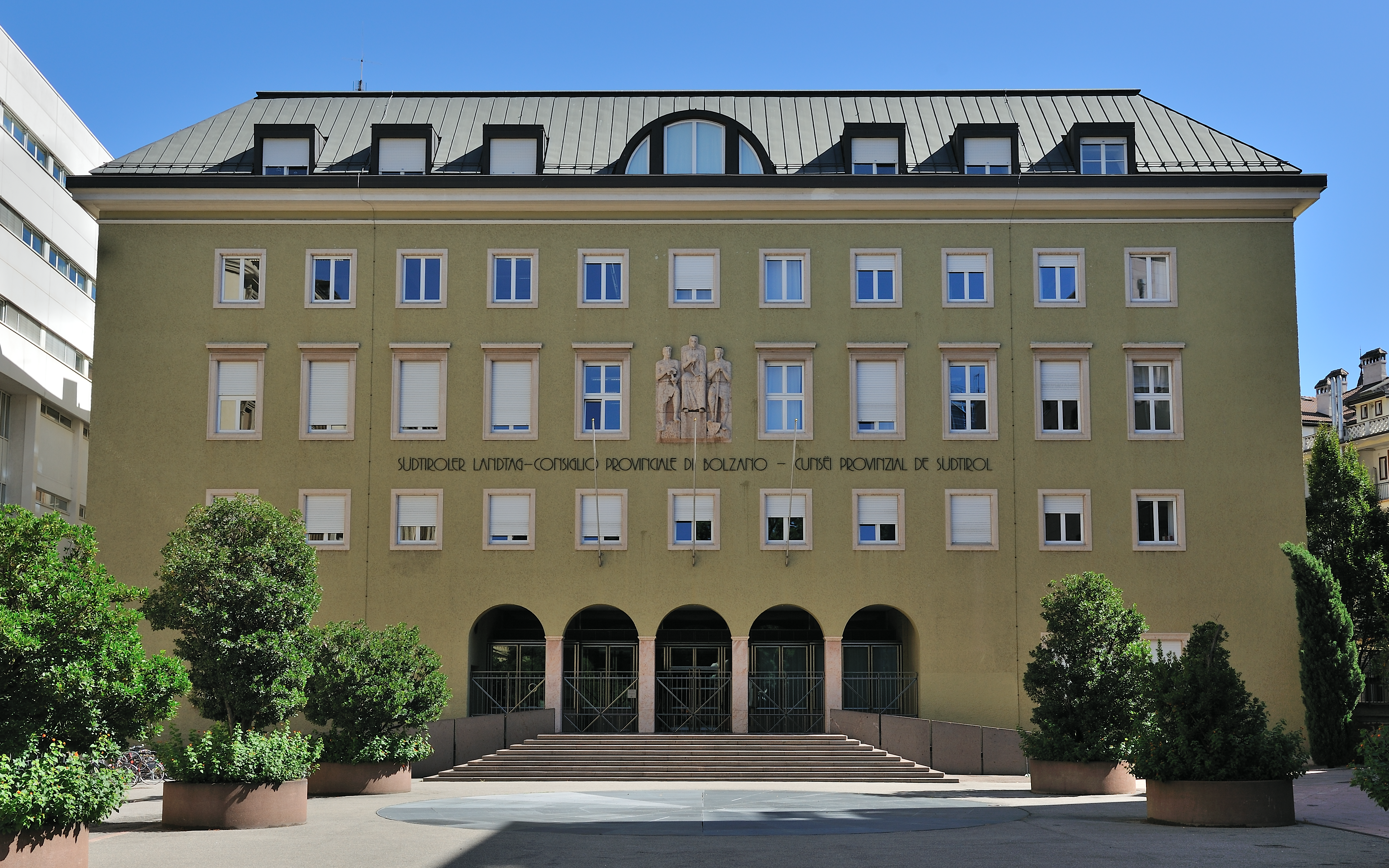
The provincial assembly building of South Tyrol

The region is divided into two autonomous provinces: Trentino (Autonomous Province of Trento) and South Tyrol (Autonomous Province of Bolzano). The Italian Republic recognised a certain degree of autonomy for the region and its two constituent provinces, which was the result of the Gruber–De Gasperi Agreement of 1946, as well as of the special status of autonomy approved by constitutional law in 1948. This statute gave the region the right to initiate its own laws on a wide range of subjects and to carry out respective administrative functions.

In 1972, the introduction of the second Statute of Autonomy, which was in the centre of the discussions between the Italian and Austrian governments, meant the transfer of the main competencies from the region to the two provinces. The autonomy recognized by the special statute covers the political, legislative, administrative, and fiscal institutions. The second statute turned the region de facto into a loose commonwealth with devolved powers to the two autonomous provinces, with very limited legislative or executive competencies left.

The capital city is Trento, although the two provincial capitals alternate biennially (the other being Bolzano) as the site of the regional assembly.

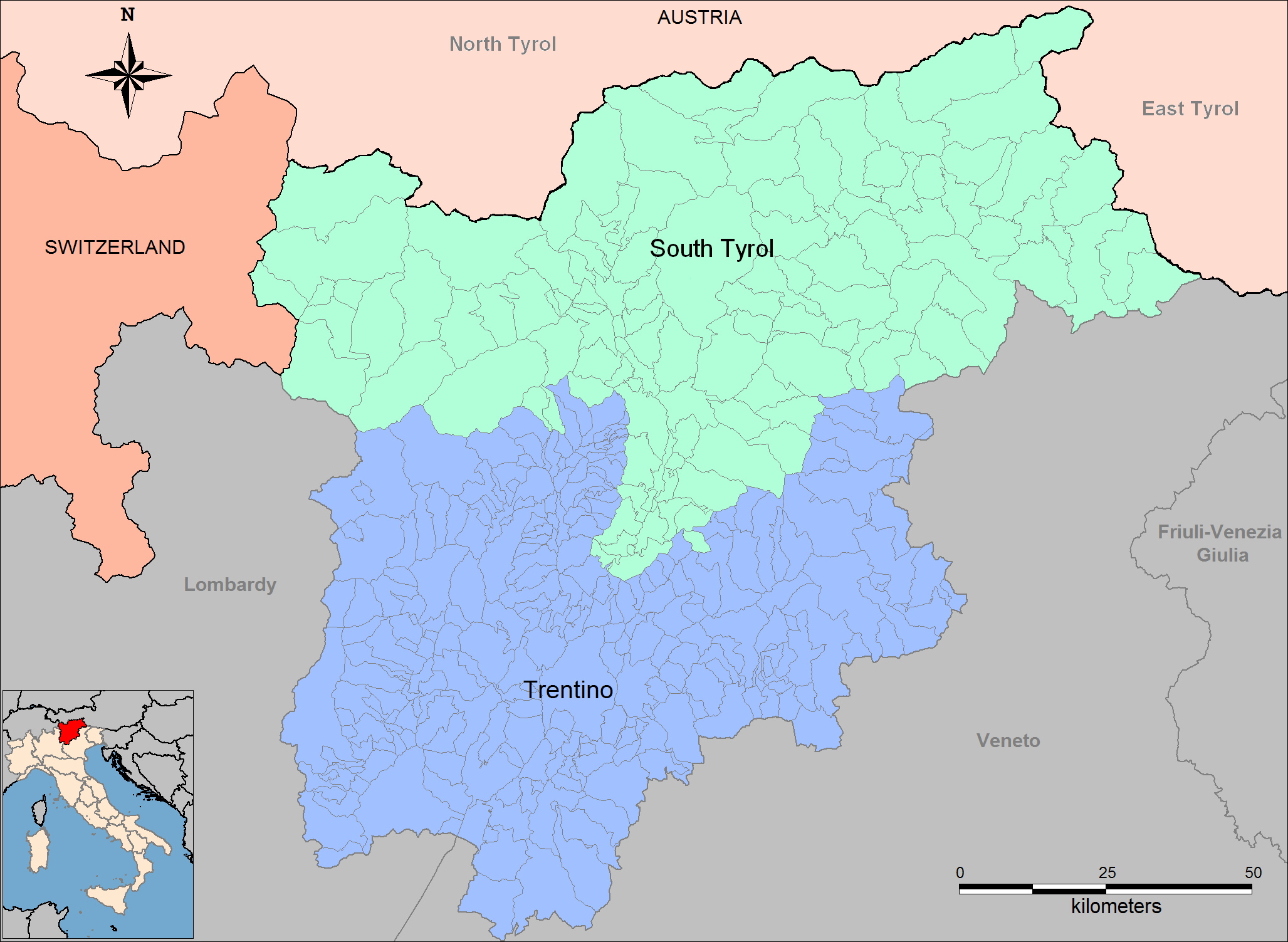
Map of the two autonomous provinces of the region

Province	Population (2026)	Area (km^{2})	Density	Municipalities
South Tyrol	542,134	7,398.38	73.3	115
Trentino	548,684	6,207.12	88.4	167

== Demographics ==
Historical population
Year	Pop.	±%
1921	660,847	—
1931	666,283	+0.8%
1936	669,029	+0.4%
1951	728,604	+8.9%
1961	785,967	+7.9%
1971	841,886	+7.1%
1981	873,413	+3.7%
1991	890,360	+1.9%
2001	940,016	+5.6%
2011	1,029,475	+9.5%
2021	1,073,574	+4.3%
Source: ISTAT

As of 2026, the population is 1,090,818, of which 49.6% are male, and 50.4% are female. Minors make up 16.8% of the population, and seniors make up 23.0%.

The population density in the region is low compared to Italy as a whole, with 80.2 inhabitants per square kilometer, whereas the national density is 195.1 per square kilometer. The population density in the province of Trento was 88.4 per square kilometer, higher than the figure of South Tyrol at 73.3.

=== Languages ===
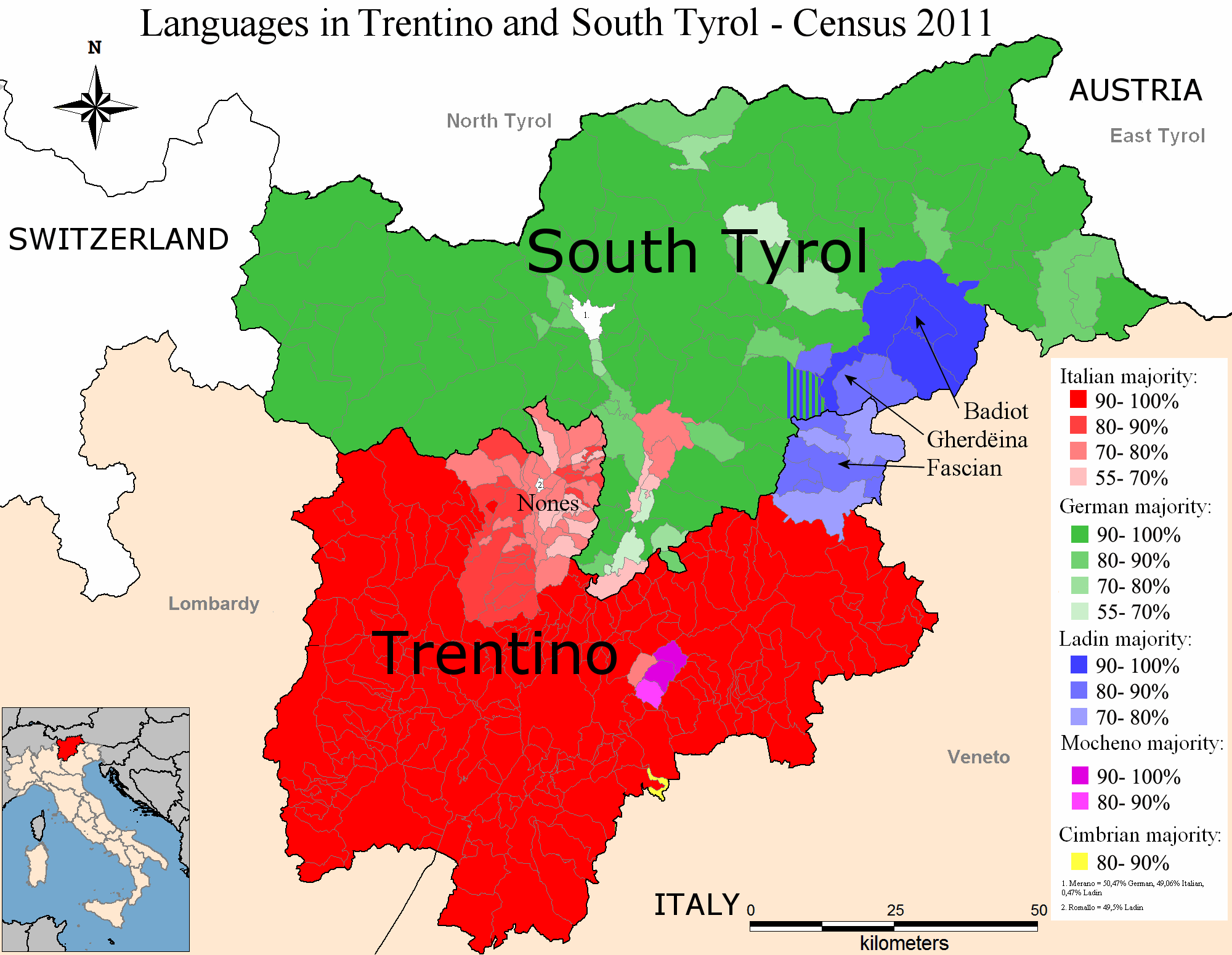
2011 linguistic census: Italian majority German majority Ladin majority Mòcheno majority (Upper German variety) Cimbrian majority (Upper German variety)

The main language groups are Italian and German, with small minorities speaking Ladin, Lombard (namely the Eastern subgroup), Venetian, Mòcheno and Cimbrian. The latter two of which are varieties of the Upper German Bavarian dialect.

In Trentino, the majority language is Italian, although there are Cimbrian minorities in the municipality of Luserna and four Mòcheno municipalities in the Mòcheni Valley. There are also Ladin-speaking minorities living in the Fassa Valley and in Non Valley (3.5% of the population). While in the Fassa Valley, Ladin already enjoys official status, in the Non Valley, it still does not, despite there being more Ladin speakers in the latter than in the former. Sole Valley also historically belongs to the Ladin area.

In South Tyrol, the majority language is German (62% of the population). Many of the German speakers use South Tyrolean dialects in informal settings. In South Tyrol's capital city Bolzano, 73% of the population speaks Italian as their maternal language due to internal immigration from other regions of Italy. Italian speakers are also a significant component in other major urban centres of the province, such as in Merano (49% Italian as the mother language) and Brixen (26% mother language). More than 90% of the 120,000 Italian speakers live in Bozen/Bolzano, Merano, Leifers and Brixen, and the greater part of the rest in the small towns south of the capital, just north of the border with Trentino or scattered about in very small numbers throughout the rest of the province. The Italian language is the majority in 5 of 116 municipalities. Italian is the first language of 26% of the population (down from 35% in 1960) of the population of 453,000 recorded in the 2011 census, not counting the 51,000 who listed Language as "Other" who are immigrants. Ladin is the additional official language in some municipalities and the majority in 8. According to the census of 2001, 103 out of 116 communes have a majority of German native speakers, eight of Ladin speakers and five of Italian. Today both German and Italian have the status of co-official languages in South Tyrol.

=== Immigration ===
As of 2025, immigrants make up 14.2% of the population, the 6th-highest proportion out of the Italian regions. The 5 largest foreign countries of birth are Albania, Romania, Morocco, Germany, and Pakistan.

== Economy ==
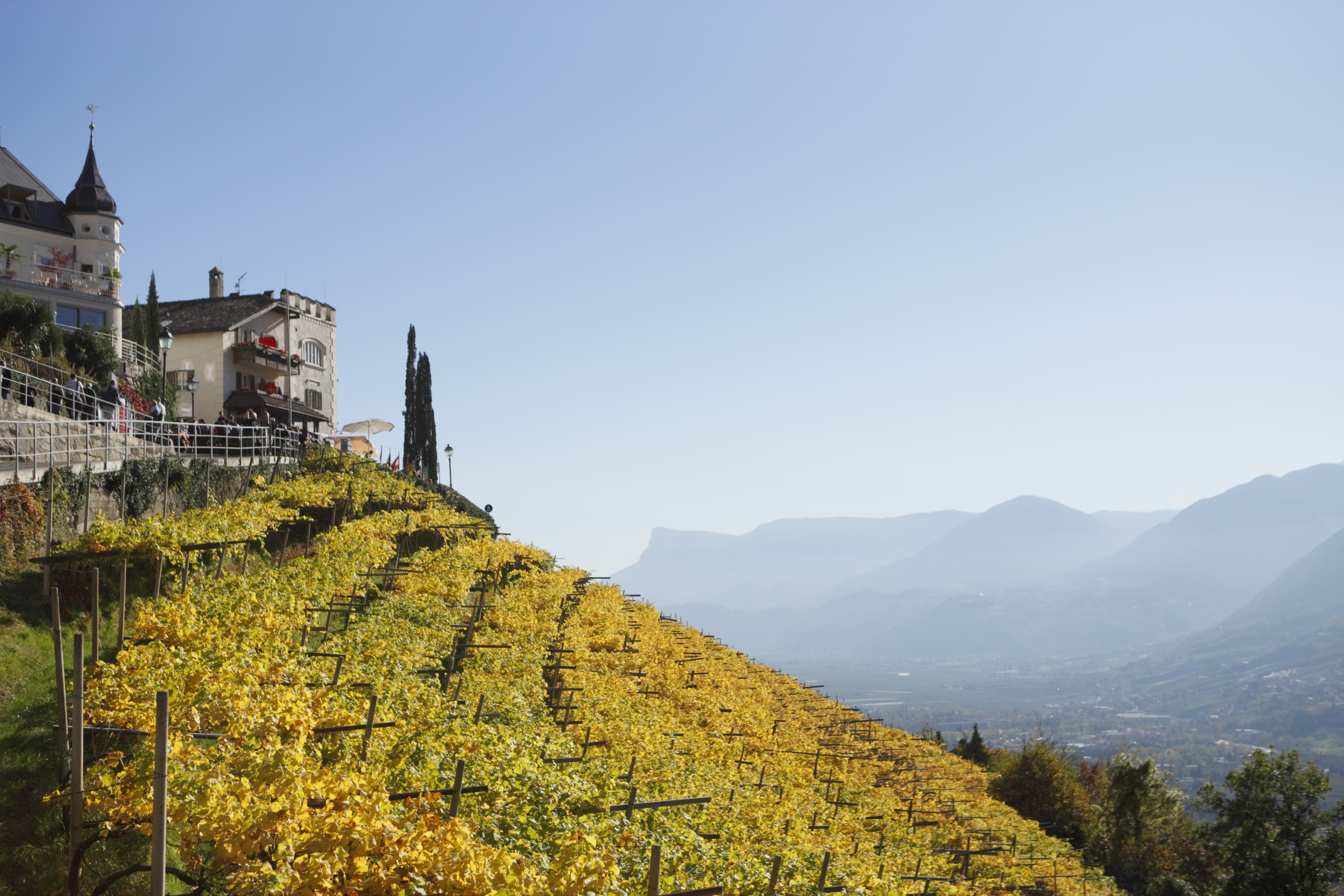
Vineyards at the municipality of Tirol

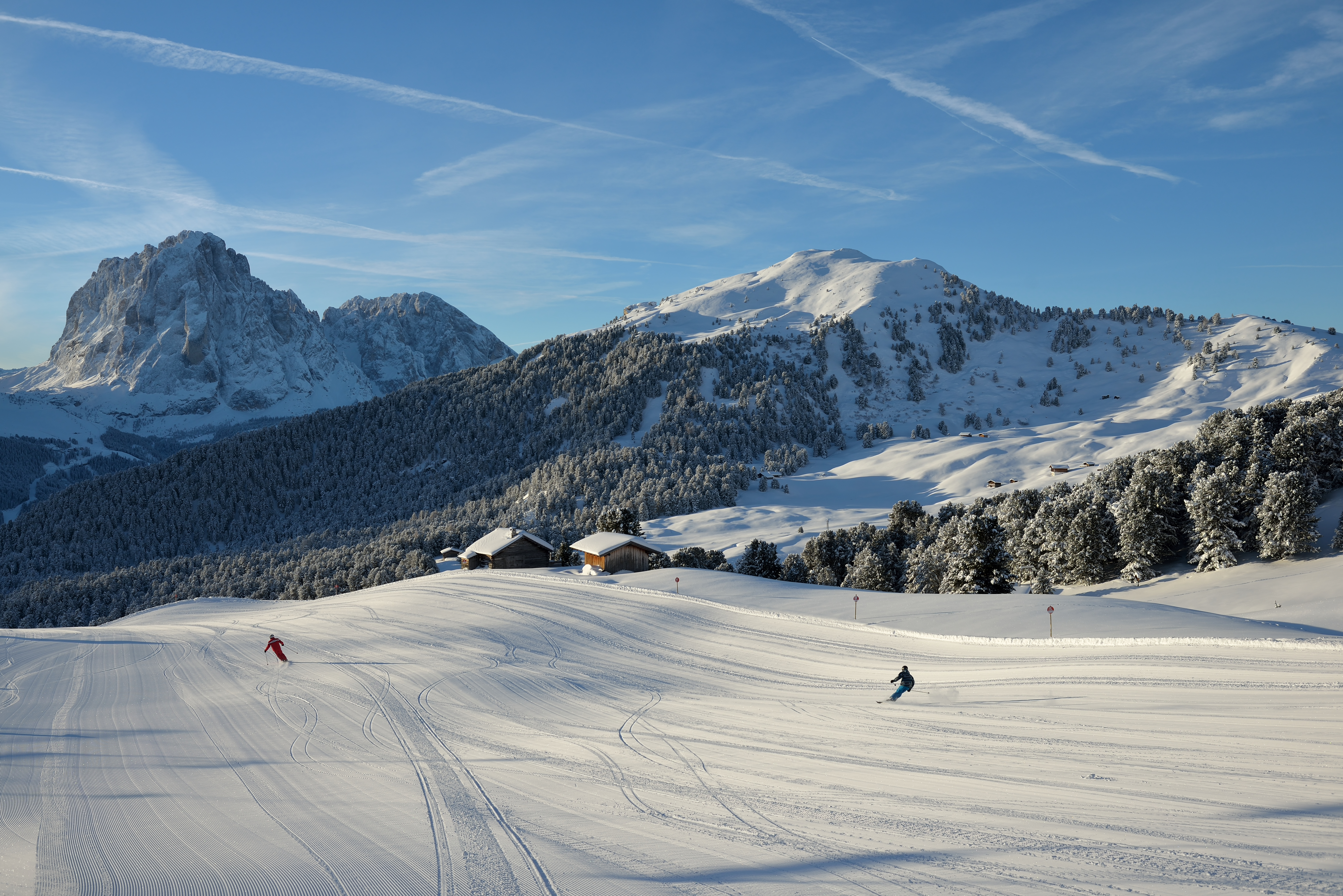
Skiing in Val Gardena

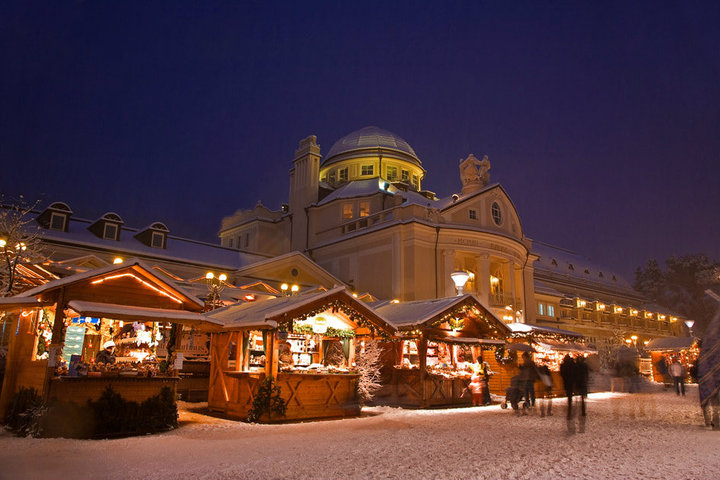
Christmas market in Merano

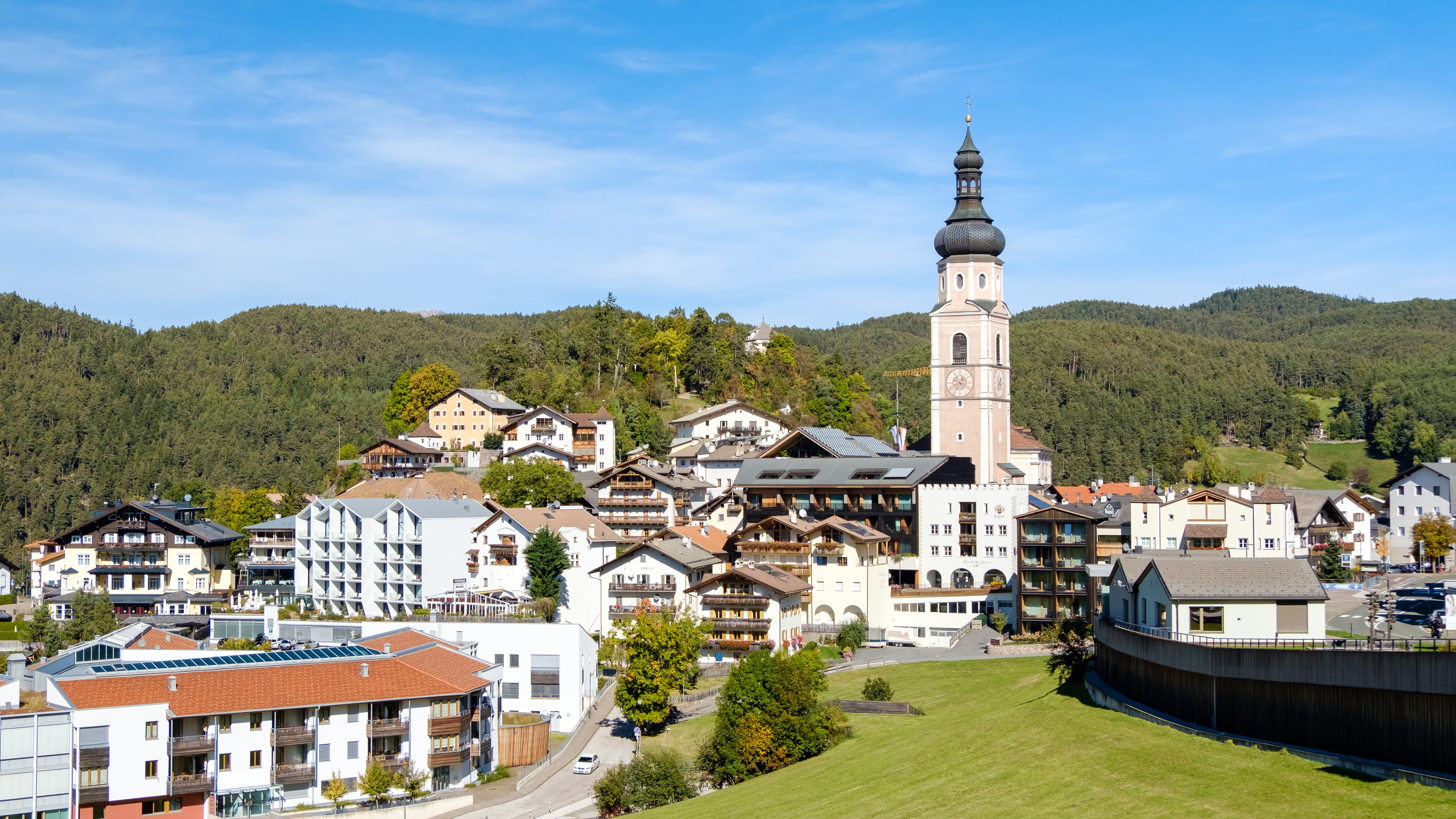
Kastelruth

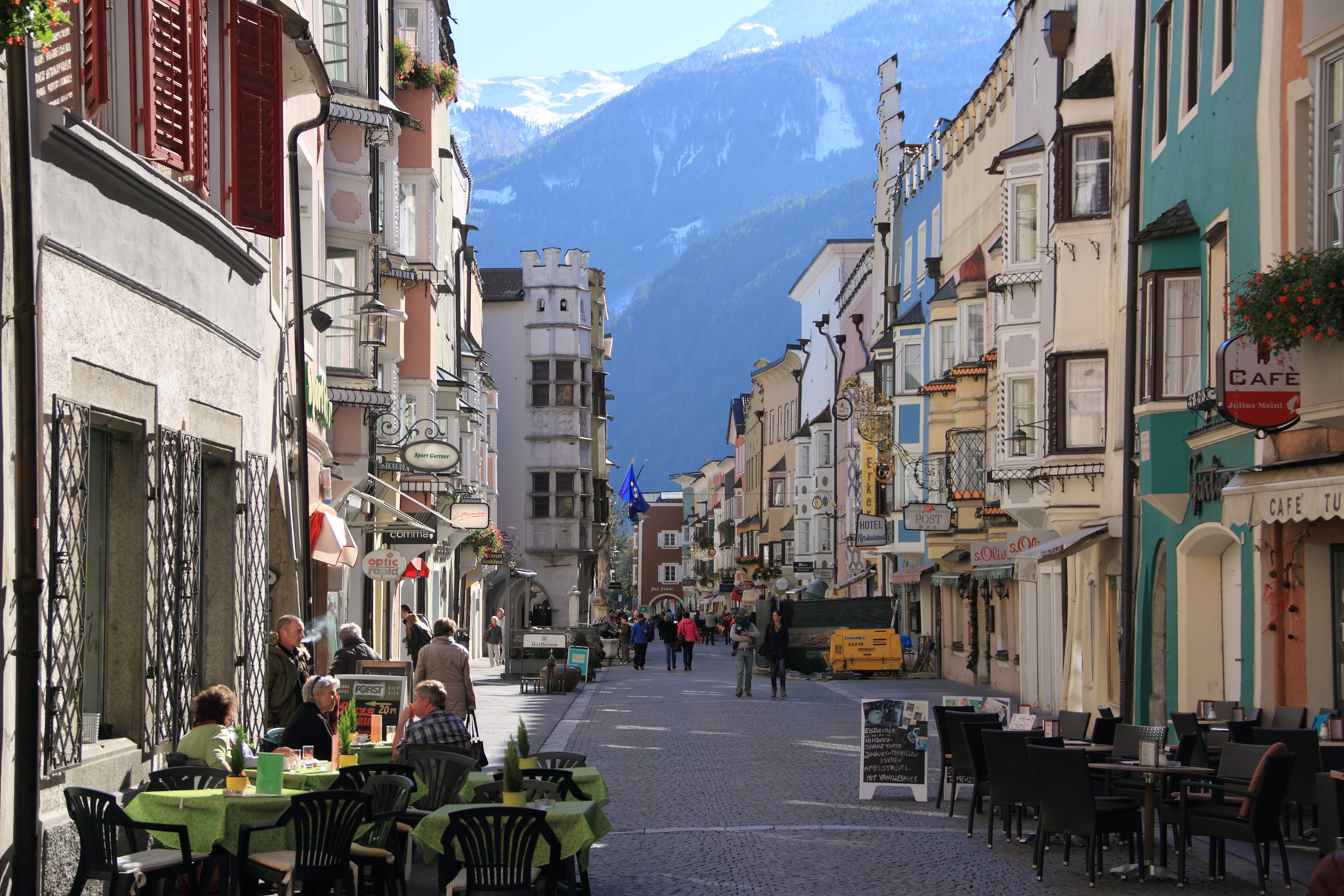
Sterzing

The region's fertile valleys produce wine, fruit, dairy products, and timber, while its industries include paper, chemical and metal production. The region is a major exporter of hydroelectric power. The most important features of the region's economic structure are the strength of tourism and the special system of co-operation between agriculture and industry. In the last decade, tourism became a very important component of the province's economy. The region, which is a staging-post between the countries of northern Europe and central and southern Italy, has found its true vocation in this leading branch of the services sector with all its spin-offs. The region has a higher concentration of hotels than any other region (6,178 establishments in 2001 with 236,864 hotel beds). The total accommodation capacity of the region counts for 651,426 beds available in hotels and other establishments.

Because of its unique history and location within the southern Alps and Dolomites, in this region grows a wide range of grape varieties that are not usually seen in other parts of Italy. These include Müller-Thurgau, Vernatsch, Lagrein, Sylvaner, Riesling (known in Italian as Riesling Renano), Gewürztraminer (known in Italian as Traminer Aromatico) and Blatterle. Winemaking in Tyrol has a long tradition: the first evidence dates back to the period before the Romans. The South Tyrolean winegrowing area is highly influenced by the Mediterranean climate, which in the Adige Valley (Überetsch-Unterland, Überetsch, Bozen, Terlan, Burggrafenamt) arrives up to Meran. This allows a very versatile winemaking, which includes almost all the red grape varieties and a lot of white grape wines. The Vinschgau and the Eisacktal have a harsher climate and thus they're specialized in white wines. In South Tyrol there are three indigenous varieties: Schiava, Gewürztraminer and Lagrein. A similar winegrowing region is Trentino wine in the south.

Christmas in Italy begins on 8 December with the Feast of the Immaculate Conception, the day on which traditionally Christmas trees are erected, and ends on 6 January of the following year with Epiphany. In Italy, the oldest Christmas market is considered to be that of Bologna, held for the first time in the 18th century and linked to the feast of Saint Lucia. The tradition of the markets has however spread in Italy predominantly especially since the 1990s, with the birth of the first modern markets: among these, the first ever was that of Bolzano, born in 1991, which was followed by others in South Tyrol, in particular in Merano, Brixen, Sterzing and Bruneck. The Trento Christmas market, established in 1993, is renowned in Trentino.

Trentino-Alto Adige/Südtirol has many small and picturesque villages, 16 of them have been selected by I Borghi più belli d'Italia (English: The most beautiful Villages of Italy), a non-profit private association of small Italian towns of strong historical and artistic interest, that was founded on the initiative of the Tourism Council of the National Association of Italian Municipalities. These villages are:

- Bondone
- Borgo Valsugana
- Caldes
- Canale di Tenno
- Kastelruth
- Klausen
- Neumarkt
- Glurns
- Luserna
- Mezzano
- Ossana
- Pieve Tesino
- Rango
- San Giovanni di Fassa
- San Lorenzo in Banale
- Sterzing

== Transport ==
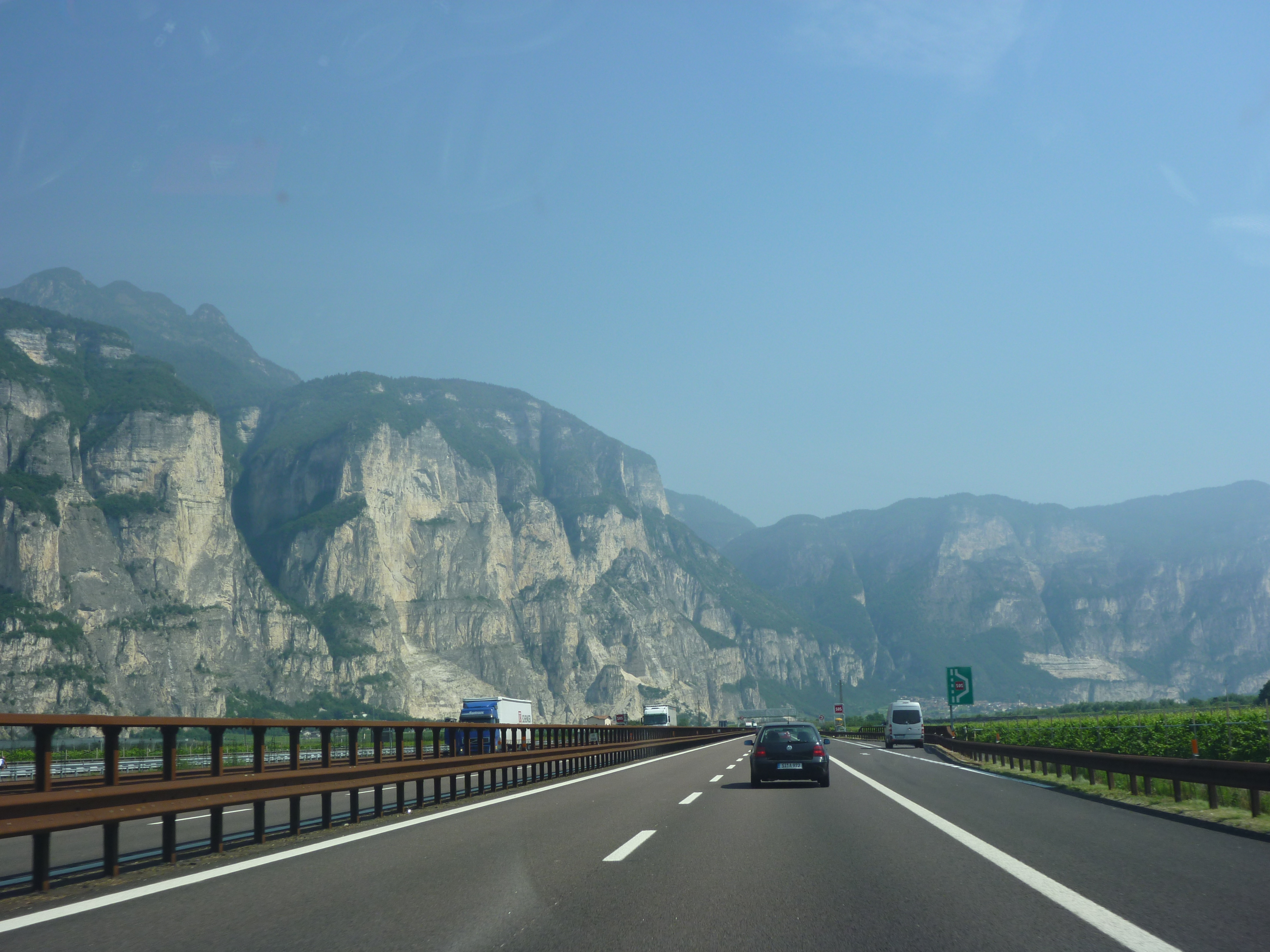
Autostrada A22 from Verona to Bolzano

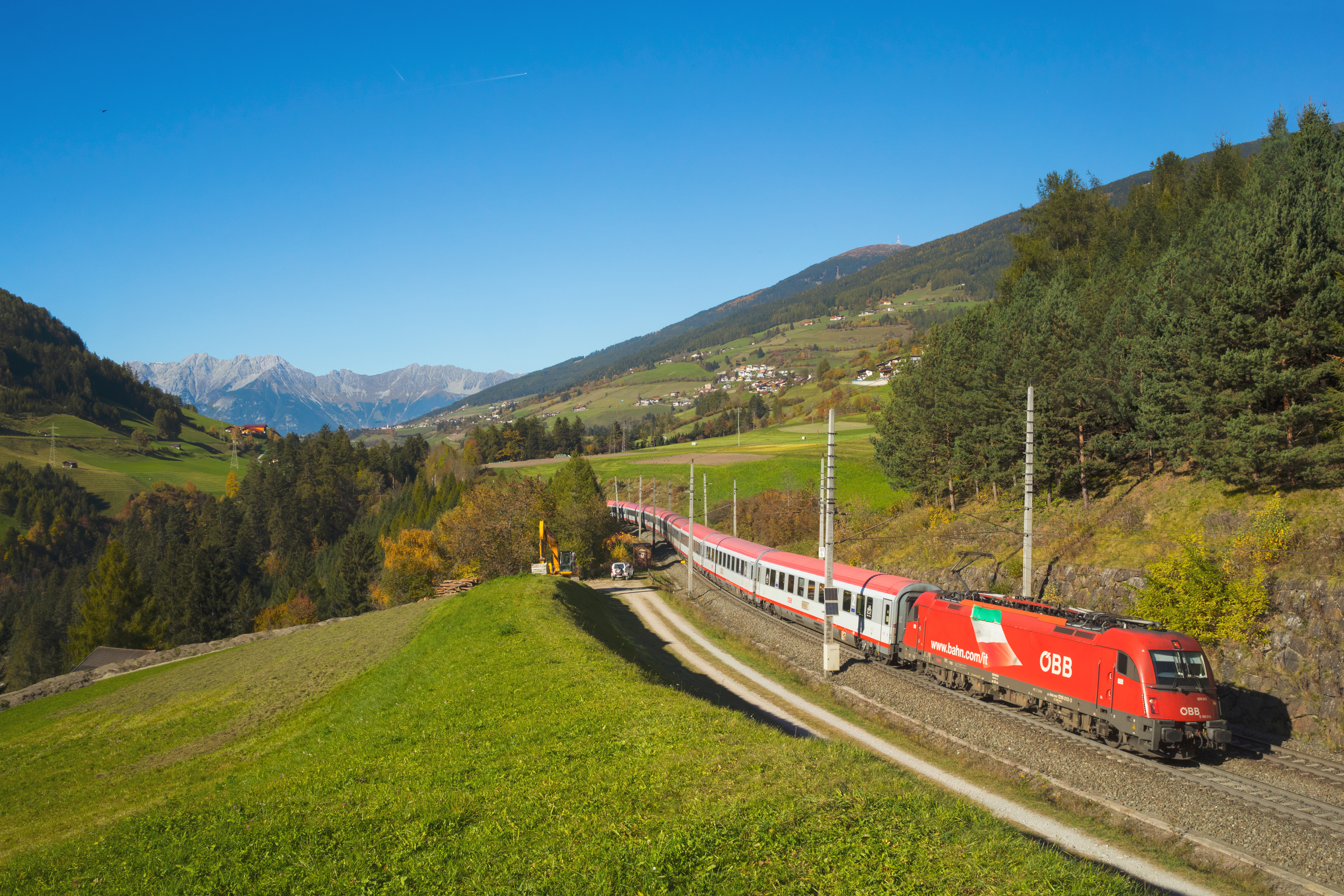
Brenner Railway

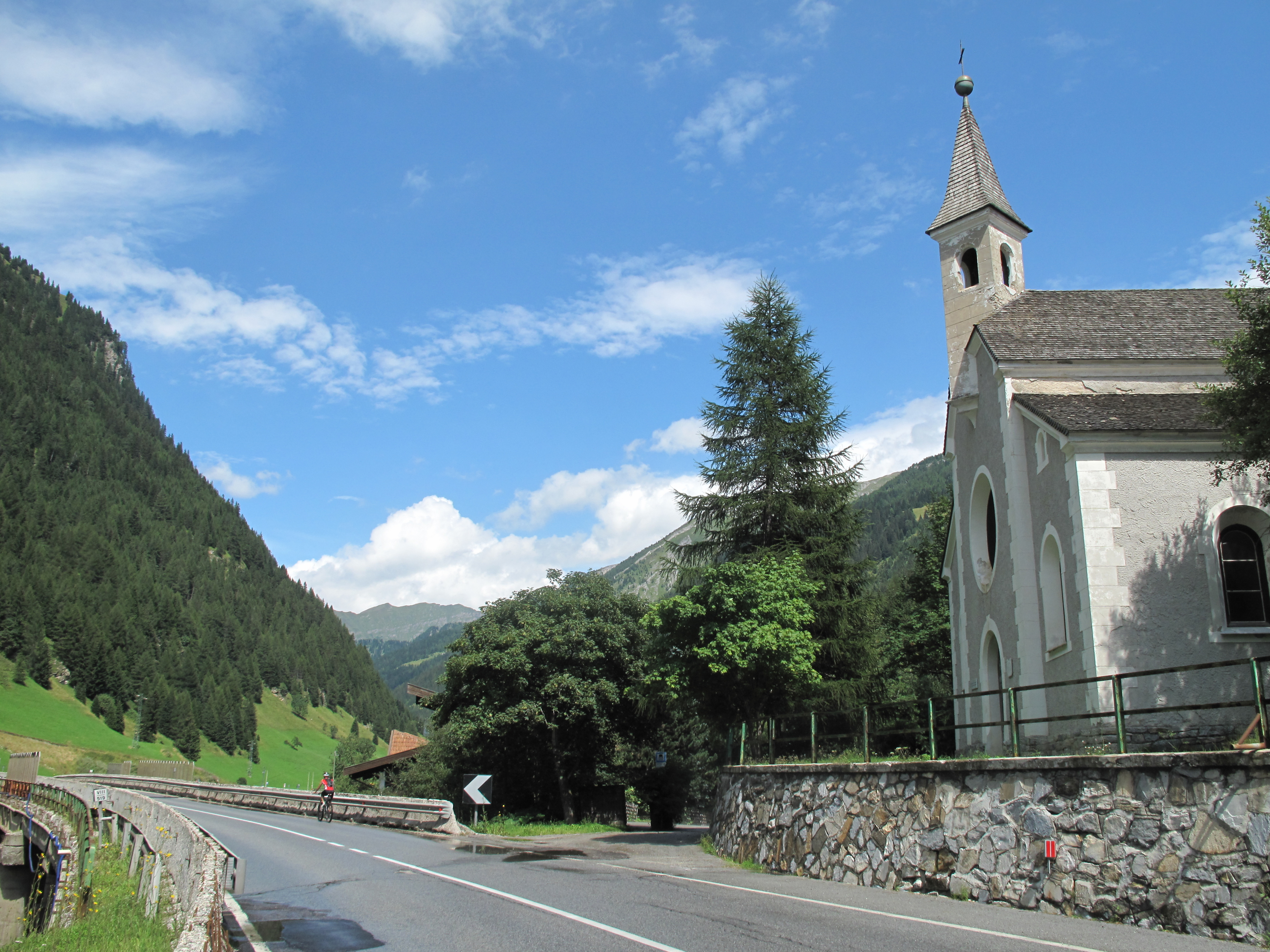
Strada statale 12 dell'Abetone e del Brennero in Brenner

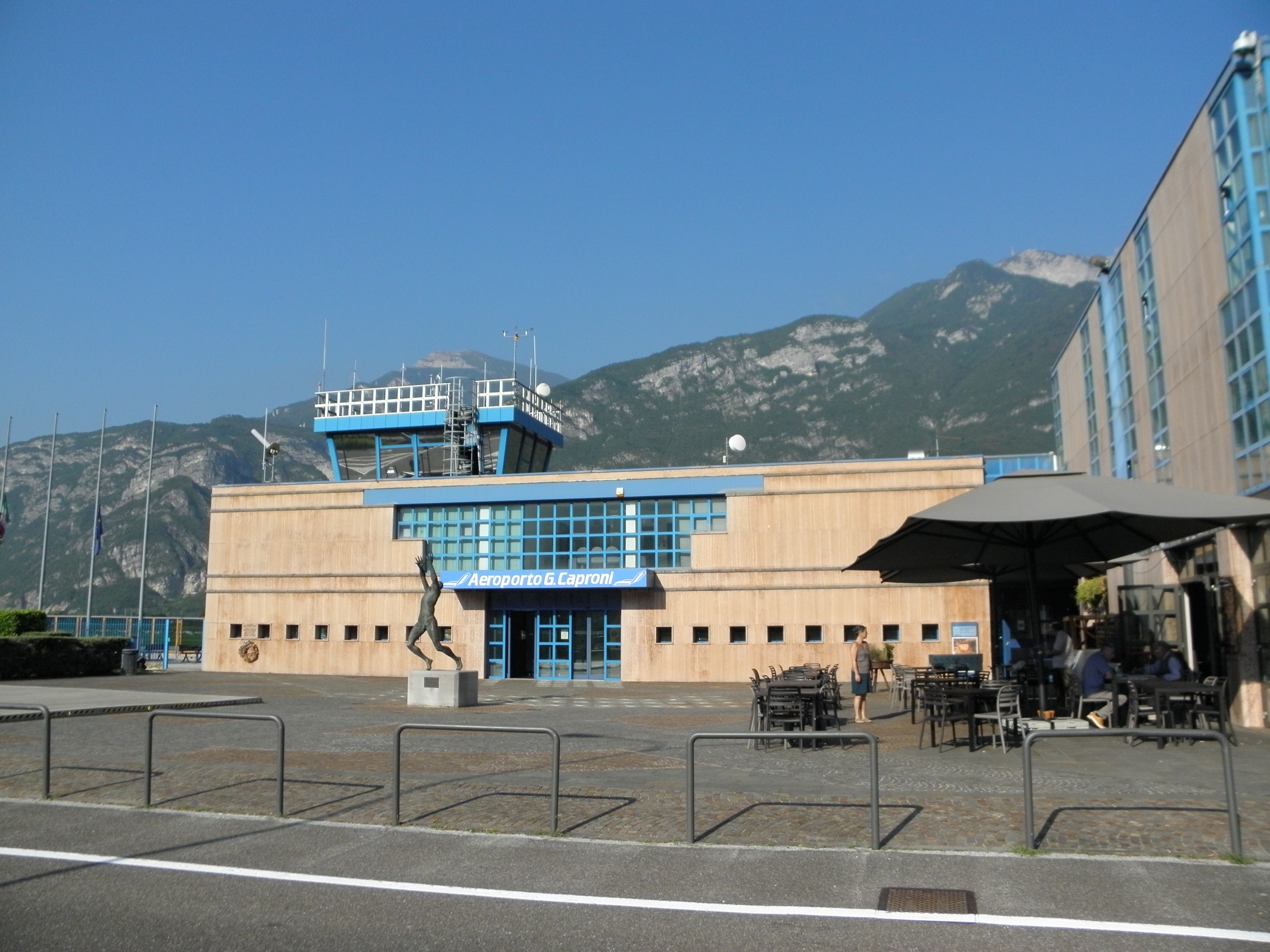
Trento-Mattarello Airport

The infrastructure system of Trentino-Alto Adige/Südtirol is made up of railway, airport, motorway, road and lake lines.

The main railway line consists of the Brenner Railway (German: Brennerbahn; Italian: Ferrovia del Brennero), which runs along the Adige Valley from Trentino to Bolzano, and through the Isarco Valley at the end of the border with Austria (Brenner Pass). The Trento–Venice railway, the Trento–Malè–Mezzana railway, the Puster Valley Railway are minor. The Brenner Railway is a major line connecting the Austrian and Italian railways from Innsbruck to Verona, climbing up the Wipptal (German for "Wipp Valley"), passing over the Brenner Pass, descending down the Eisacktal (German for "Eisack Valley") to Bolzano, then further down the Adige Valley to Rovereto, and along the section of the Adige Valley, called in Italian the "Vallagarina", to Verona. This railway line is part of the Line 1 of Trans-European Transport Networks (TEN-T). It is considered a "fundamental" line by the state railways Ferrovie dello Stato (FS).

The Trentino-Alto Adige airport service is divided into the 3 large airports: Trento-Mattarello Airport, Bolzano Airport and Dobbiaco Airport. Trento-Mattarello Airport (Italian: Aeroporto di Trento-Mattarello, also known as Aeroporto G.Caproni, is an airfield located at Trentino, 3.4 NM (6.3 km; 3.9 mi) south of Trento, Italy. The airport is at an elevation of 610 feet (186 m) above mean sea level. It has one runway designated 18/36 with an asphalt surface measuring 1,130 by 30 metres (3,707 ft × 98 ft). Bolzano Airport (Italian: Aeroporto di Bolzano — Dolomiti, German: Flughafen Bozen — Dolomiten) is a regional airport near Bolzano in the province of South Tyrol in northern Italy. The airport was established in October 1926 with a 1,300-metre (4,300 ft) landing runway. The Dobbiaco Airport lies approximately 1 km to the South of the village of Dobbiaco and is Italy's northernmost and highest airport. The military airfield has a 700 m long and 50 m wide grass runway and is managed by the Italian Air Force's Airport Detachment Toblach. On weekends and holidays from May to October, the airport is open for civilian traffic.

The region is crossed by a single motorway, on the Autostrada A22. The Autostrada A22 or Autobrennero or Autostrada del Brennero ("Brenner motorway"; German: Brennerautobahn) is one of the most important autostrada (Italian for "motorway") in Italy, as it connects Po Valley, the city of Modena and the Autostrada A1 to Austria through the Brenner Pass, located in the municipality of Brenner. The Autostrada A22 is 315 kilometres (196 mi) long. It is a part of the E45 European route. The operator of the road is Autostrada del Brennero S.p.A.. The Autostrada A22 is located in the regions of Emilia-Romagna, Lombardy, Veneto and Trentino-Alto Adige/Südtirol.

Another important artery of the Trentino-Alto Adige road is the Strada statale 12 dell'Abetone e del Brennero, which runs parallel to the Autostrada A22, and the Strada statale 38 dello Stelvio, which links Bolzano to Merano. Strada statale 12 dell'Abetone e del Brennero (SS 12) is an Italian state highway 523.6 kilometres (325.3 mi) long in Italy located in the regions of Tuscany, Emilia-Romagna, Lombardy, Veneto and Trentino-Alto Adige/Südtirol that connects Pisa to the Austrian border at Brenner Pass. Strada statale 38 dello Stelvio (SS 38, German: Stilfserjochstraße) is an Italian state highway 224.29 kilometres (139.37 mi) long in Italy located in the regions of Lombardy and Trentino-Alto Adige/Südtirol that connects Valtellina with the South Tyrolean Vinschgau via the Stelvio Pass (2,758 metres (9,049 ft)), to continue in Etschtal until it reaches Bolzano.

Riva del Garda is connected to the other towns on Lake Garda via a regulated bank line.

== Media ==
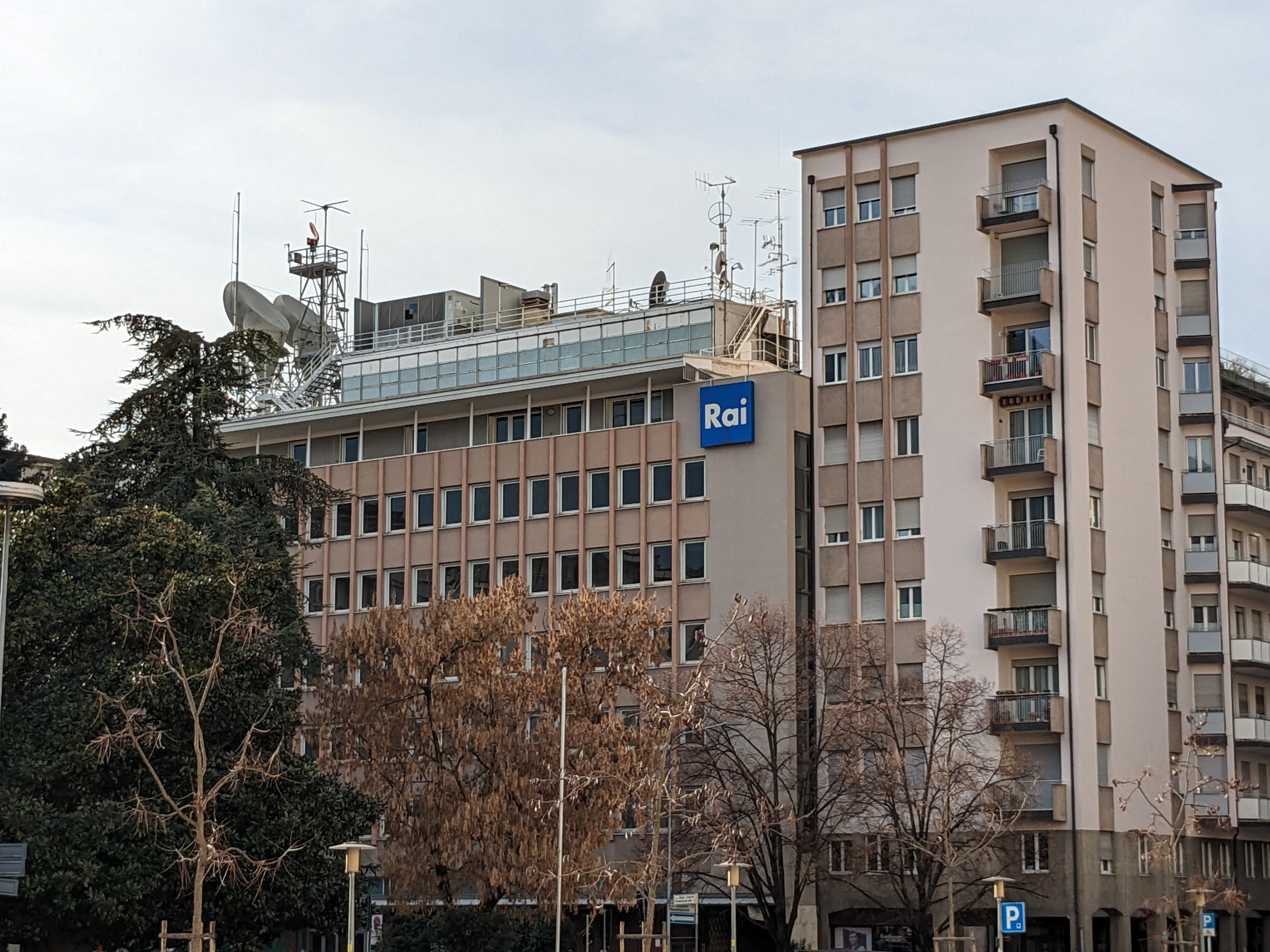
The seat of Italy's national public broadcasting company Rai in Bozen/Bolzano, South Tyrol. The building houses the editorial offices of Rai Südtirol, Rai Ladinia and Rai Alto Adige.

L'Adige is the regional daily newspaper of Trentino-Alto Adige but is mainly distributed in the province of Trento. With an average circulation of 28,511 copies, it is the second most-read newspaper in the region, preceded by Dolomiten in German with 50,711 copies, mostly sold in South Tyrol. The third regional newspaper is Alto Adige/Trentino with an average circulation of 27,736 copies (as of January 2013).

RAI maintains two separate offices in Trento and Bolzano. The Bolzano office includes RAI Alto Adige in Italian, RAI Südtirol in German, and RAI Ladinia in Ladin. RAI Alto Adige works in collaboration with the provincial office in Trento. Therefore, there is no single RAI Trentino-Alto Adige at the regional level.

The Radiotelevisione Azienda Speciale (Special Broadcasting Company) for the autonomous province of Bolzano broadcasts German, Austrian, and Swiss radio and TV programs in the South Tyrol area, especially for the German-speaking population.

Regional private networks include Radio Tele Trentino Regionale (RTTR), Trentino TV (which offers television content for the Cimbrian, Mòcheno, and Ladin linguistic minorities), and Video 33.

== Food and wine ==
Many dishes, such as canederli (bread dumplings), strudel, and sauerkraut, show the strong influence of Austrian cuisine in Trentino-Alto Adige.

A typical agri-food product of the region is speck (smoked cured ham).

The region produces various types of wine, including Alto Adige Pinot Bianco, Alto Adige Val Venosta aromatic Traminer, Teroldego Rotaliano, Lagrein, Trentino Müller-Thurgau, Trento white sparkling wine, and Alto Adige Valle Isarco Sylvaner Bressanone.

A typical bread from Trentino-Alto Adige is the spaccata.

== Symbols ==
Coat of arms of Trentino-Alto Adige/Südtirol

The coat of arms quarters the arms of Trentino (black eagle) and the arms of South Tyrol (red eagle). The Flag of Trentino-Alto Adige/Südtirol consists of a coat of arms, containing two eagles of San Venceslao (Trentino) and two Tyrolean red eagles (Alto Adige), historical symbols of the two provinces, which stand out against a white and blue background. The shape of the flag is a rectangle with a framed heraldic shield on it. Like other flags, the flag of Trentino-Alto Adige is also inspired, albeit differently, by the French flag introduced with the revolution of 1789. When Napoleon's army crossed Italy, starting from March 1796, flags of tricolour style were adopted both by the various newborn Jacobin republics and by the military units that supported the French army. In the Alpine region, however, sketches of the two-tone known today began to emerge. Trentino-Alto Adige has been a region with a special statute since 1948. The two parts that make it up, the province of Trento and the province of Bolzano, in turn, constitute two provinces with particular prerogatives of autonomy defined in 1972. The white-blue flag, in use (limited) since 1995, takes up the characteristics of the banner, including the shield with quartered eagles from the province of Trento (1st and 4th) and that of Bolzano (2nd and 3rd). White and blue are the colours on which the coats of arms of Trento and Bolzano, respectively, were worn in ancient times. It has never been legally defined, unlike the coat of arms and the banner, approved on 17 September 1982 and approved by presidential decree of 21 March 1983.

The flag of Trentino-Alto Adige/Südtirol

The flag has no ancient origins and most likely derives from the French tricolour, with the colours in the flag and in the coat of arms. With the Austrian reoccupation of the area, completed in 1814 by Bellegarde against Beauharnais, and confirmed by the Congress of Vienna, the Trentino-Altoatesino bicolour was completely abandoned, defined as a symbol of the past Napoleonic regime. With regard to Trentino, the first public signal of Austrian intentions to dissolve the army of the Kingdom of Italy consisted of the prohibition, issued by Bellegarde on 13 June 1814, of wearing tricolour cockades, which evidently were very widespread. Certainly, Francis II and Bellegarde were convinced that no other ties had matured in the meantime. There are various versions of the exact origin of the flag. One claims that the flag was created after World War I, while other says that it was all a coincidence, mainly because it was thought that such different ethnic groups, like the Austrians and the Italians, had never shared a territory. The flag of Trentino-Alto Adige has ancient origins in terms of its coat of arms. The eagle of St. Wenceslas, making up the coat of arms, was granted by John of Bohemia on 9 August 1339. The rest of the flag consists of two horizontal bands of blue and white, with the coat of arms in the centre.

== See also ==
- Tyrol
- Trentino
- South Tyrol
- Districts of Trentino-Alto Adige/Südtirol
