= Flag of Trentino-Alto Adige/Südtirol =

Flag of Trentino-South Tyrol
- Proportion: 2:3
- Adopted: 12 June 1975
- Design: A horizontal bicolour of white and blue, with the coat of arms of Trentino-South Tyrol superimposed on top

The flag of Trentino-Alto Adige consists of a coat of arms, containing two eagles of San Venceslao (Trentino) and two Tyrolean red eagles (Alto Adige), historical symbols of the two provinces, which stand out against a white and blue background. The shape of the flag is a rectangle with a framed heraldic shield on it. Like other flags, the flag of Trentino-Alto Adige is also inspired, albeit differently, by the French flag introduced with the revolution of 1789. When Napoleon's army crossed Italy, starting from March 1796, flags of tricolour style were adopted both by the various newborn Jacobin republics and by the military units that supported the French army. In the Alpine region, however, sketches of the two-tone known today began to emerge. Trentino-Alto Adige has been a region with a special statute since 1948. The two parts that make it up, the province of Trento and the province of Bolzano, in turn, constitute two provinces with particular prerogatives of autonomy defined in 1972. The white-blue flag, in use (limited) since 1995, takes up the characteristics of the banner, including the shield with quartered eagles from the province of Trento (1st and 4th) and that of Bolzano (2nd and 3rd). White and blue are the colours on which the coats of arms of Trento and Bolzano respectively were worn in ancient times. It has never been legally defined, unlike the coat of arms and the banner, approved on 17 September 1982 and approved by presidential decree of 21 March 1983.

== History ==
The flag has no ancient origins, and most likely derives from the French tricolour, with the colours in the flag and in the coat of arms. With the Austrian reoccupation of the area, completed in 1814 by Bellegarde against Beauharnais, and confirmed by the Congress of Vienna, the Trentino-Altoatesino bicolour was completely abandoned, defined as a symbol of the past Napoleonic regime. With regard to Trentino, the first public signal of Austrian intentions to dissolve the army of the Kingdom of Italy, consisted in the prohibition, issued by Bellegarde on 13 June 1814, of wearing tricolour cockades, which evidently were very widespread. Certainly, Francis II and Bellegarde were convinced that no other ties had matured in the meantime. There are various versions of the exact origin of the flag. One claims that the flag was created after World War I, while other says that it was all a coincidence, mainly because it was thought that such different ethnic groups, like the Austrians and the Italians, had never shared a territory. The flag of Trentino-Alto Adige has ancient origins in terms of its coat of arms. The eagle of St. Wenceslas, making up the coat of arms, was granted by John of Luxembourg on 9 August 1339. The rest of the flag consists of two horizontal bands of blue and white, with the coat of arms in the centre.

== Gallery ==
Flag of Trentino

Proposed flag of Trentino by Lega Nord

Historical flag of the Prince-Bishopric of Trent (until 1793)

Historical flag of the Prince-Bishopric of Trent (From 1801 until 1802)

Flag of Alto Adige/Südtirol
